= Pennsylvania House of Representatives, District 8 =

American legislative district

Pennsylvania's 8th State House of Representatives district
Representative
Aaron Bernstine; R–Ellwood City
- Population (2022): 65,051

Pennsylvania House of Representatives District 8 is located in Western Pennsylvania and has been represented by Republican Aaron Bernstine since 2023.

== District profile ==
The 8th Pennsylvania House of Representatives District is located in Butler County and Lawrence County and includes the following areas:

Butler County

- Brady Township
- Center Township
- Clay Township
- Connoquenessing
- Connoquenessing Township
- Forward Township
- Franklin Township
- Lancaster Township
- Middlesex Township
- Muddy Creek Township
- Penn Township
- Portersville
- Prospect
- West Liberty
- West Sunbury
- Worth Township

Lawrence County

- Ellport
- Ellwood City (Lawrence County portion)
- Enon Valley
- Little Beaver Township
- New Beaver
- Perry Township
- Plain Grove Township
- Scott Township
- Slippery Rock Township
- Volant
- Wampum
- Washington Township
- Wayne Township

== Representatives ==
Representative	Party	Years	District home	Note
Prior to 1969, seats were apportioned by county.
Roy Wilt	Republican	1969–1981	Greenville	Elected to Pennsylvania Senate in 1981.
Howard Fargo	Republican	1981–2001	Grove City	
Dick Stevenson	Republican	2001–2015	Grove City	
Tedd Nesbit	Republican	2015–2020	Grove City	Elected to Mercer County Court of Common Pleas in 2019.
Timothy R. Bonner	Republican	2020–2022	Grove City	Elected on March 12, 2020, special election; redistricted to the 17th district in 2022
Aaron Bernstine	Republican	2023–present	Ellwood City	Redistricted from the 10th district in 2022

== Recent election results ==
PA House election, 2024: Pennsylvania House, District 8
Party	Candidate	Votes	%
Republican	Aaron Bernstine (incumbent)	Unopposed	
Total votes		33,763	100.00
Republican hold			

PA House election, 2022: Pennsylvania House, District 8
Party	Candidate	Votes	%
Republican	Aaron Bernstine (incumbent)	Unopposed	
Total votes		25,702	100.00
Republican hold			

PA House election, 2020: Pennsylvania House, District 8
Party	Candidate	Votes	%
Republican	Timothy Bonner (incumbent)	23,838	75.15
Democratic	Phil Heasley	7,883	24.85
Total votes		31,721	100.00
Republican hold			

PA House special election, 2020: Pennsylvania House, District 8
Party	Candidate	Votes	%
Republican	Timothy Bonner	4,000	75.08
Democratic	Phil Heasley	1,328	24.92
Total votes		5,328	100.00
Republican hold			

PA House election, 2018: Pennsylvania House, District 8
Party	Candidate	Votes	%
Republican	Todd Nesbit (incumbent)	16,221	70.78
Democratic	Lisa Boeving-Learned	6,696	29.22
Total votes		22,917	100.00
Republican hold			

PA House election, 2016: Pennsylvania House, District 8
Party	Candidate	Votes	%
Republican	Todd Nesbit (incumbent)	18,853	66.62
Democratic	Judy Hines	9,446	33.38
Total votes		28,299	100.00
Republican hold			

PA House election, 2014: Pennsylvania House, District 8
Party	Candidate	Votes	%
Republican	Todd Nesbit	Unopposed	
Total votes		14,098	100.00
Republican hold			

PA House election, 2012: Pennsylvania House, District 8
Party	Candidate	Votes	%
Republican	Dick Stevenson (incumbent)	Unopposed	
Total votes		23,187	100.00
Republican hold			

PA House election, 2010: Pennsylvania House, District 8
Party	Candidate	Votes	%
Republican	Dick Stevenson (incumbent)	Unopposed	
Total votes		18,360	100.00
Republican hold			
