= Slippery Rock Area School District =

School district in Pennsylvania, USA

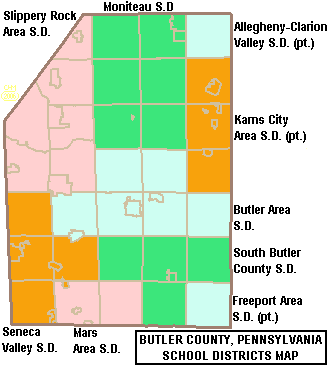

Address
- 201 Kiester Road Slippery Rock, Pennsylvania, 16057; United States

District information
- Type: Public
- Grades: K–12
- NCES District ID: 4221660

Students and staff
- Students: 1,852 (2020–2021)
- Teachers: 160.51 (on an FTE basis)
- Staff: 100.0 (on an FTE basis)
- Student–teacher ratio: 11.54:1

Other information
- Website: www.slipperyrock.k12.pa.us

Slippery Rock Area School District is a school district in Slippery Rock, Pennsylvania, U.S.A.

It operates Slippery Rock High School, as well as a middle school and two elementary schools: Moraine Elementary and Slippery Rock Area Elementary. The schools mascot is the Rockets

The district covers "approximately 135 square miles (350 km^{2}) that spreads from Harrisville, Mercer Twp. to Portersville, Muddy Creek Twp." The remaining of the eleven municipalities served are Worth Township, Prospect, Franklin Township, West Liberty, Brady Township, Slippery Rock, and Slippery Rock Township.

Additionally, the district covers the Lake Arthur Estates and Slippery Rock University census-designated places.
