= Pennsylvania Route 528 =

State highway in Butler County, Pennsylvania, US

Pennsylvania Route 528

Route information
- Maintained by PennDOT
- Length: 22.514 mi (36.233 km)

Major junctions
- South end: US 19 near Zelienople
- I-79 near Zelienople; PA 68 near Evans City; PA 488 in Prospect; US 422 in Prospect
- North end: PA 8 near West Liberty

Location
- Country: United States
- State: Pennsylvania
- Counties: Butler

Highway system
- Pennsylvania State Route System; Interstate; US; State; Scenic; Legislative
← PA 527	→ PA 529

Pennsylvania Route 528 (PA 528) is a 22 1/2-mile-long (36.2 km) state highway located in Butler County, Pennsylvania. The southern terminus is at U.S. Route 19 (US 19) near Zelienople. The northern terminus is at PA 8 near West Liberty.

== Route description ==
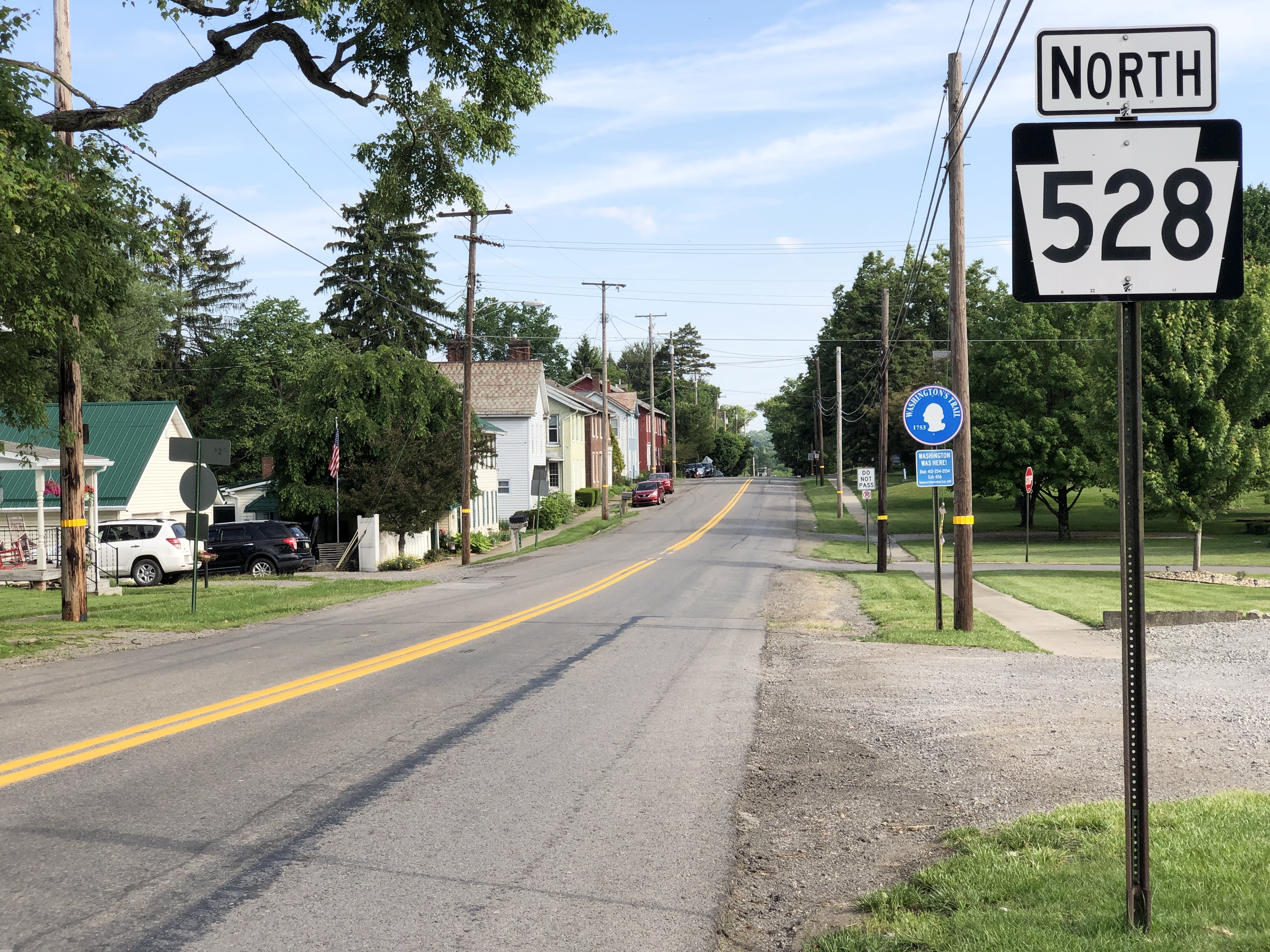
PA 528 northbound past PA 488 in Prospect

PA 528 begins at an intersection with US 19 in Jackson Township, heading northeast on two-lane undivided Lindsay Road. A short distance past US 19, the route comes to a partial interchange with Interstate 79 (I-79), with access to the southbound direction, and from the northbound direction of I-79. After this interchange, the road passes east of a park and ride lot and heads northeast through wooded areas with some rural homes. PA 528 comes to an intersection with PA 68, at which point the route turns southeast to form a concurrency with PA 68 on Evans City Road. The road passes through woods before heading into the borough of Evans City, where it becomes West Main Street and runs past homes and businesses. The two routes curve to the east and cross the P&W Subdivision railroad line, which is owned by CSX and operated by the Buffalo and Pittsburgh Railroad, and the Breakneck Creek into the commercial downtown of Evans City, becoming East Main Street. PA 528 splits from PA 68 by turning north onto Franklin Street and passing residences before heading into woods. The route leaves Evans City for Jackson Township again and becomes Prospect Road. The road curves northeast and enters Forward Township, coming into a mix of farmland and woodland with a few rural homes. PA 528 continues north and crosses over the Buffalo and Pittsburgh Railroad's B&P Main Line Subdivision line before reaching the community of Wahlville.

The route heads northeast through open farm fields prior to crossing the Connoquenessing Creek and turning east into forests. The road curves north and passes through more wooded areas with occasional homes, crossing into Connoquenessing Township. Farther north, PA 528 passes over the Little Connoquenessing Creek before heading into a mix of farms and woods. The road passes through residential areas. The route heads into more agricultural areas with some homes, running through the community of Whitestown. The route enters the borough of Prospect and becomes South Franklin Street, continuing through more open farmland. PA 528 comes into the center of the borough and passes homes, becoming North Franklin Street at the PA 488 intersection. Farther north, the route heads through more rural areas of residences. Upon crossing into Franklin Township, PA 528 becomes Prospect Road again and reaches an interchange with the US 422 freeway. Following this interchange, the road runs through a mix of farmland and woodland with some homes. The surroundings become more forested as the route enters Moraine State Park, where it crosses Lake Arthur. A short distance north of the lake, PA 528 continues into Brady Township and runs through more of the state park. The route passes northeast through forested areas of the Jennings Environmental Education Center prior to reaching its northern terminus at PA 8.

== Major intersections ==
The entire route is in Butler County.

Location	mi	km	Destinations	Notes
Jackson Township	0.000	0.000	US 19 (Perry Highway) to Jackson's Pointe Road north / I-79 – Cranberry, Zelienople	Southern terminus
Jackson Township	0.092– 0.284	0.148– 0.457	I-79 south – Pittsburgh	I-79 exit 83; southbound I-79 entrance / northbound I-79 exit only
Jackson Township	2.883	4.640	PA 68 west (Evans City Road) – Zelienople	South end of PA 68 overlap
Evans City	3.762	6.054	PA 68 east (East Main Street) – Butler	North end of PA 68 overlap
Prospect	14.184	22.827	PA 488 (Main Street) – Portersville, Butler	
Franklin Township	14.843– 14.970	23.887– 24.092	US 422 (Benjamin Franklin Highway) – Butler, New Castle	Interchange
Brady Township	22.514	36.233	PA 8 (William Flinn Highway) – Harrisville, Franklin, Butler	Northern terminus
1.000 mi = 1.609 km; 1.000 km = 0.621 mi: Concurrency terminus; Incomplete access
