= Pennsylvania Route 488 =

State highway in Pennsylvania, US

Pennsylvania Route 488

Route information
- Maintained by PennDOT
- Length: 17.0 mi (27.4 km)

Major junctions
- West end: PA 65 / PA 288 in Ellwood City
- US 19 in Portersville; I-79 near Portersville
- East end: US 422 in Moraine State Park

Location
- Country: United States
- State: Pennsylvania
- Counties: Lawrence, Butler

Highway system
- Pennsylvania State Route System; Interstate; US; State; Scenic; Legislative
| ← PA 487 | → PA 490 |

Pennsylvania Route 488 (PA 488) is a 17-mile-long (27 km) state highway located in Lawrence and Butler counties in Pennsylvania. The western terminus is at PA 65/PA 288 in Ellwood City. The eastern terminus is at U.S. Route 422 (US 422) in Moraine State Park.

== Route description ==
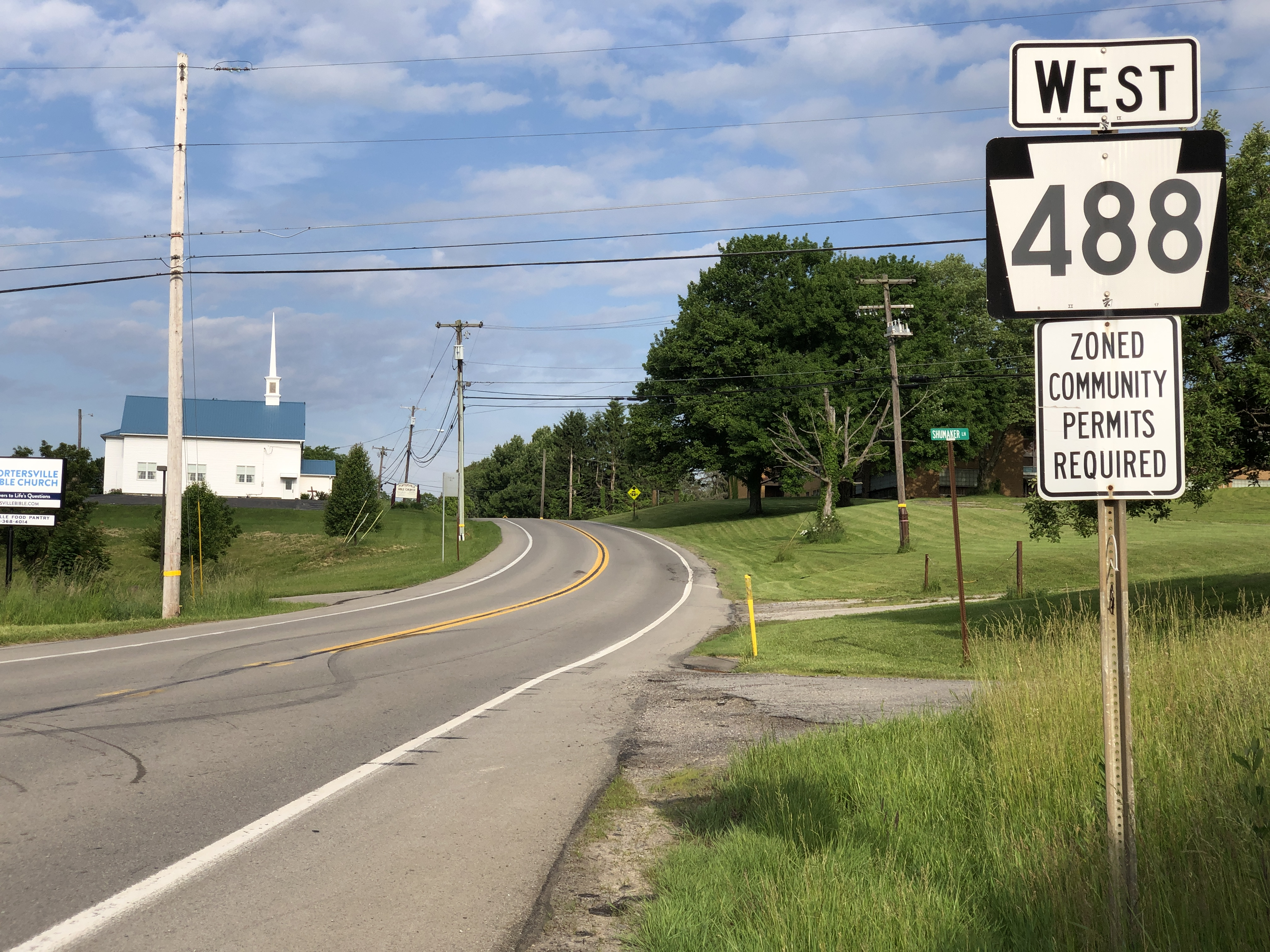
PA 488 westbound past I-79 in Portersville

PA 488 begins at an intersection with PA 65/PA 288 in the borough of Ellwood City in Lawrence County, heading east on two-lane undivided Fountain Avenue. The road passes through residential areas before heading into commercial and industrial areas, turning southeast onto Portersville Road. The route heads into the community of Burnstown in Wayne Township and running between woods to the north and homes to the south. PA 488 forms the border between Wayne Township to the north and Ellwood City to the south as it passes to the north of a steel mill. The road turns east and enters the borough of Ellport, passing a mix of residences and businesses. The route crosses the Connoquenessing Creek into Perry Township and heads into more wooded areas of residential development. PA 488 turns to the northeast and crosses the Slippery Rock Creek back into Wayne Township, passing through Wurtemburg. The road crosses the creek again and heads back into Perry Township, entering wooded areas with some fields and homes. The route continues northeast through more farmland and woodland with some homes.

PA 488 enters Muddy Creek Township in Butler County and becomes West Portersville Road, soon heading into the borough of Portersville as it passes through more rural areas. The road turns east and passes homes, reaching an intersection with US 19. At this point, PA 488 turns south to form a concurrency with US 19 on Perry Highway, a three-lane road with a center left-turn lane that runs through residential and commercial areas. PA 488 splits from US 19 by turning east onto two-lane undivided East Portersville Road. The road passes a mix of farmland and homes before crossing back into Muddy Creek Township and coming to an interchange with I-79. A park and ride lot is located at the southwest corner of this interchange. Past this interchange, the route heads into wooded areas with some farms and residences. PA 488 enters more forested areas with a few homes as it skirts the southern edge of Moraine State Park and turns to the south. The road heads southeast into more farmland and woodland, crossing into the borough of Prospect and becoming Main Street. The route passes through residential areas with some fields and trees, turning east into more dense areas of homes and crossing PA 528. PA 488 passes more residences before heading into a mix of farmland and woodland with some development, crossing into Franklin Township and ending at US 422.

== Major intersections ==
| County | Location | mi | km | Destinations | Notes |
|---|---|---|---|---|---|
| Lawrence | Ellwood City | 0.0 | 0.0 | PA 65 / PA 288 (Fountain Avenue / 2nd Street) – New Castle, Rochester | Western terminus |
| Butler | Portersville | 9.7 | 15.6 | US 19 north (Perry Highway) – Mercer | West end of US 19 overlap |
| Butler | Portersville | 9.9 | 15.9 | US 19 south (Perry Highway) – Zelienople | East end of US 19 overlap |
| Butler | Muddy Creek Township | 10.4 | 16.7 | I-79 – Pittsburgh, Erie | Exit 96 (I-79) |
| Butler | Prospect | 15.7 | 25.3 | PA 528 (Franklin Street) – Evans City, Stone House | |
| Butler | Franklin Township | 17.0 | 27.4 | US 422 (Benjamin Franklin Highway) – New Castle, Butler | Eastern terminus |
1.000 mi = 1.609 km; 1.000 km = 0.621 mi: Concurrency terminus

== PA 488 Truck ==
Pennsylvania Route 488 Truck
- Location: Ellwood City, Pennsylvania
- Existed: 2013–2018

Pennsylvania Route 488 Truck was a truck route around a weight-restricted bridge over the Stony Creek. It followed PA 65/288, PA 65 (after the split), PA 388, US 422, and US 19. For partial length, the route was cosigned with the former PA 351 Truck. The route was signed in 2013 and deleted sometime before 2018 following a bridge repair.
