= Glacier Ridge Trail =

Hiking trail in Pennsylvania, United States

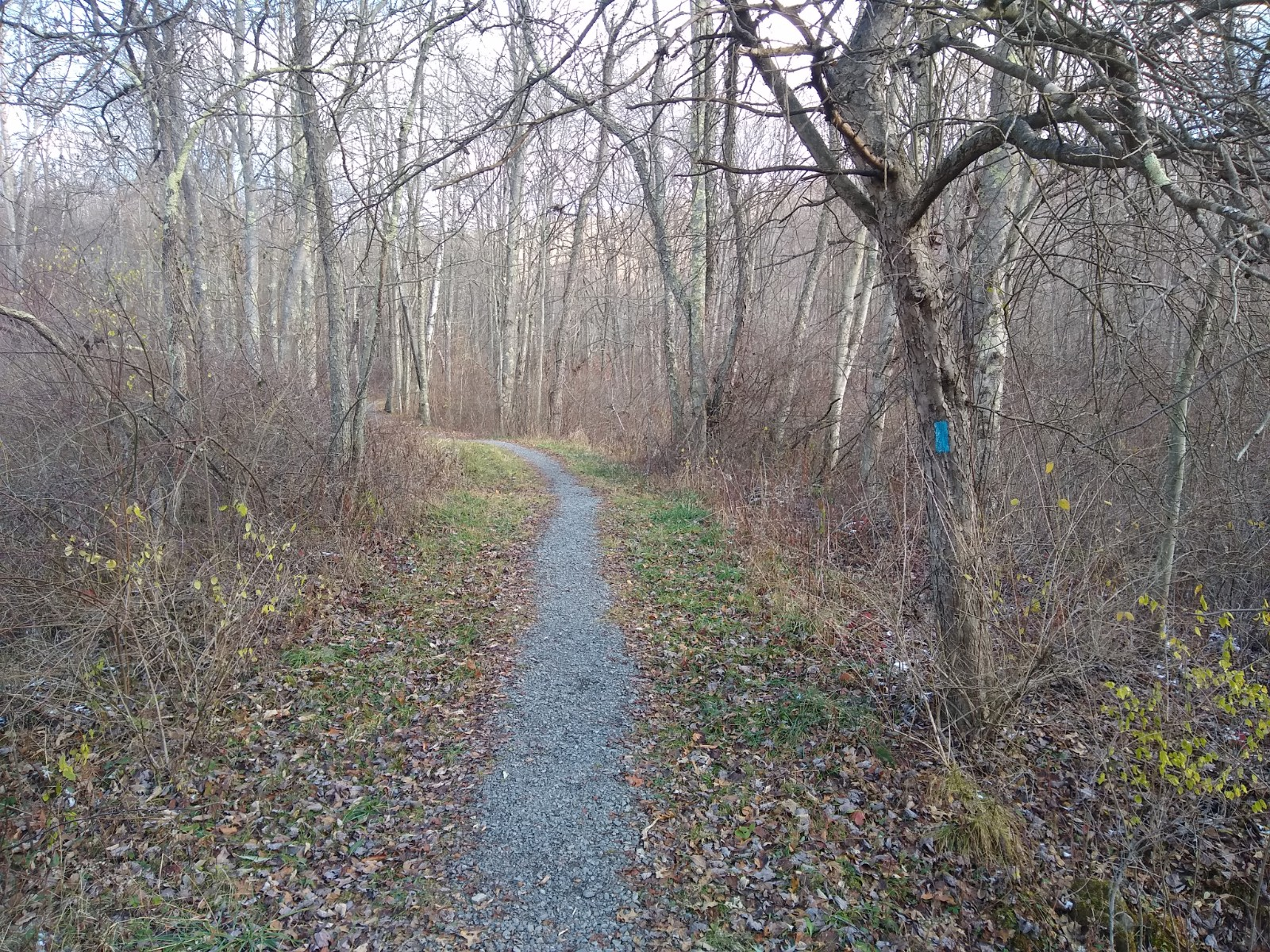
- The Glacier Ridge Trail in the northeastern section of Moraine State Park
- Length: 14.8 mi (23.8 km)
- Location: Butler County, Pennsylvania, US
- Trailheads: Jennings Environmental Education Center, Moraine State Park
- Use: Hiking, horse riding
- Elevation change: Low
- Difficulty: Moderate
- Season: Year-round

The Glacier Ridge Trail is a 14.8-mile-long (23.8 km) hiking trail in western Pennsylvania. The trail extends from Moraine State Park to Jennings Environmental Education Center. As its name implies, the trail largely follows a ridgeline and associated features formed by glaciers during the Last Glacial Period.

== Route ==
The Glacier Ridge Trail begins on the west side of Moraine State Park, at the corner of West Side Road and Burnside Road. It passes under a road bridge that carries US Route 422 over an arm of Lake Arthur, then proceeds through state park grounds around the northwestern corner of the lake. The trail continues to the east, and crosses PA Route 528 at about 10 miles. The trail then turns to the north and roughly parallels Route 528 for the rest of its distance. A view of Lake Arthur is passed at 10.4 miles. For the next several miles, the trail proceeds through remote forested areas in the northeastern segment of Moraine State Park, crossing several paved roads. At about 14.4 miles the trail crosses a border into the grounds of Jennings Environmental Education Center and crosses Route 528 again, and then ends at the Center's main parking area.

The Glacier Ridge Trail has since been added to the route of the North Country National Scenic Trail.
