= Frank W. Preston =

- Frank W. Preston
- Born: June 14, 1896; Leicester, Leicestershire, England
- Died: March 1, 1989 (aged 92); Butler, Pennsylvania, United States
- Occupations: American conservationist, ecologist, glass engineer
- Spouse: Jane Hupman

Frank W. Preston (May 14, 1896 – March 1, 1989) was an English-American engineer, ecologist, and conservationist. He helped found the Western Pennsylvania Conservancy and worked to reclaim the land that is now Moraine State Park in Butler County, Pennsylvania, in the United States. Preston was a leading expert in glass technology. He studied birds throughout his life and published papers on the shapes and pigmentation of birds' eggs, the distribution of the heights of their nests, and their migration patterns. Preston also wrote three major papers on the mathematical characteristics of ecological rarity and commonness.

== Biography ==
=== Early life ===
Frank W. Preston was born on May 14, 1896, in Leicester, England. He received three degrees from the University of London upon graduation in 1916. Following his college years, Preston worked as a civil engineer in Loughborough, England. He was drafted into the British Army during World War I but received a maximum exemption through the efforts of his employer. Preston was personally against the exemption and wrote the draft board in 1917 stating a desire to serve "in anything useful and suggested a brief exemption."

Preston first traveled to the United States in 1920. His employer, William Taylor, sent him to Rochester, New York to work with George Eastman of Eastman Kodak. Taylor had developed a lens polishing machine that Eastman was interested in using for his camera manufacturing business. Preston returned to England and earned a Ph.D. at London University in 1925. He returned to the United States the following year and established Preston Laboratories in 1926 or 1927 in Butler.

=== Work with glass ===
Frank W. Preston's "day job" centered around his business, Preston Laboratories, where he researched glass. He became known as a troubleshooter for glass companies like Corning Incorporated. He invented a glass-melting furnace that allowed Corning Glass to create its line of Corelle glassware.

=== Work as a conservationist ===
Preston Laboratories was first located in Butler, then later moved to Meridian, Pennsylvania. Meridian is just south of the Muddy Creek and Slippery Rock Creek valleys. These valleys are where Preston began his work as a conservationist. Preston walked throughout the valleys and mapped their geological and geographic attributes. He discovered glacial erratics, kettle hole bogs and figured out how the mammoths and mastodons migrated through the area during the ice ages.

On a trip to the Muddy Creek Valley he noticed that despite the barren landscape that had been left by the oil wells and strip mines of the late 19th and early 20th century, the valley had a rich natural history of moraines. Preston worked to form the Western Pennsylvania Conservancy, which purchased the land that became Moraine State Park, recreated the glacial landscape and preserved open spaces. Muddy Creek was dammed to form Lake Arthur.

The Western Pennsylvania Conservancy worked with the state to reclaim the land. The mines were sealed, over 400 oil and gas wells were capped, and the land that had been stripped was covered again with back fill, and graded to resemble its former condition. The soil was specially treated with fertilizer to allow for the growth of thousands of trees, shrubs and grasses. Lake Arthur was completed in 1970 with the opening of Moraine State Park on May 23, 1970.

== Legacy ==
Frank W. Preston continued to work in ecology and conservation in his adopted home state of Pennsylvania. He worked hand in hand with Maurice K. Goddard and Otto Emery Jennings in creating state parks in Western Pennsylvania including, McConnells Mill State Park, Maurice K. Goddard State Park and the Jennings Environmental Education Center which borders Moraine State Park to the north. Frank W. Preston died on March 1, 1989, in Butler, Pennsylvania. His Meridian property has since become a park owned and maintained by Butler Township following the death of his wife, Jane, in 2008. The property was willed to the township on the grounds that it never be timbered, mined, or drilled for natural gas. The park was named Preston Park in his honor.

== Bibliography ==
The following articles authored by Frank W. Preston appeared in Ecology a scientific journal published by the Ecological Society of America.

"The Commonness, and Rarity, of Species" 1948
"Time and Space and the Variation of Species" 1960
"The Canonical Distribution of Commonness and Rarity" 1962
"Diversity and Stability in the Biological World" 1969
