= Lake Arthur Estates, Pennsylvania =

Unincorporated community in Pennsylvania, US

- Census-designated place
- Location within Pennsylvania Location within the United States
- Coordinates: 40°57′39″N 80°09′13″W
- Country: United States
- State: Pennsylvania
- County: Butler
- Township: Muddy Creek

Area
  - Total: 0.66 sq mi (1.72 km^{2})
  - Land: 0.66 sq mi (1.72 km^{2})
  - Water: 0 sq mi (0.00 km^{2})
- Elevation: 1,211 ft (369 m)

Population (2020)
  - Total: 494
  - Density: 745.1/sq mi (287.68/km^{2})
- Time zone: UTC-5 (Eastern (EST))
  - Summer (DST): UTC-4 (EDT)
- FIPS code: 42-40948
- GNIS feature ID: 2633668

Lake Arthur Estates is a census-designated place and mobile home court located in Muddy Creek Township, Butler County, in the U.S. state of Pennsylvania. Located near the intersections of I-79 and US 422, the village is situated west of Lake Arthur, a reservoir on Muddy Creek. The community is also just west of Moraine State Park, which surrounds the lake. As of the 2010 census the population was 594.

== Demographics ==
Historical population
Census	Pop.	Note	%±
2020	494		—
U.S. Decennial Census

== Education ==
It is in the Slippery Rock Area School District.
