= Tedd Nesbit =

American politician and attorney

Member of the Pennsylvania House of Representatives from the 8th district
- In office January 6, 2015 – January 2, 2020
- Preceded by: Dick Stevenson
- Succeeded by: Timothy R. Bonner

Personal details
- Born: April 30, 1967 (age 59)
- Party: Republican
- Education: Florida State University (BA); Western Michigan University (JD)
- Occupation: Attorney
- Website: Campaign website Representative website

Tedd Nesbit is an American politician and attorney who served as a member of the Pennsylvania House of Representatives, representing the 8th House district in Butler County and Mercer County, Pennsylvania.

== Early life and education ==
Nesbit was born and raised in Grove City, Pennsylvania, where he attended Grove City Schools. After high school, he attended Florida State University on a Marine Corps. R.O.T.C. Scholarship and graduated with a Bachelor of Science degree in Political Science.

Nesbit attended law school part-time at the Western Michigan University Cooley Law School in Lansing, Michigan and graduated magna cum laude in 2004.

== Career ==
After graduating from college, Nesbit worked as a television reporter for a CBS affiliate in Columbia, South Carolina.

In the late-1990s, Nesbit and his family moved back to Grove City and he began working for Nick Strimbu, Inc., a regional trucking company in Brookfield, Ohio, where he worked as a licensed truck driver.

Nesbit is a former Mercer County Assistant District Attorney and currently serves as a partner in the law firm of Bartholomew, Mudrinich and Nesbit (BMN).

After graduating from law school, Nesbit spent a year clerking for the Honorable John C. Reed in the Mercer Court of Common Pleas. Nesbit was elected to the Pennsylvania House of Representatives in 2014.

In November 2019, Nesbit announced that he would not seek re-election in 2020, due to being elected to the Mercer County Court of Common Pleas.

Nesbit left office on January 2, 2020. A special election was held on March 17, 2020, to fill the remainder of his term, which was won by Republican attorney, Timothy R. Bonner.

== Personal life ==
In December 2018, Nesbit was charged with a DUI after a weekend traffic stop. Charges are pending in the case, but state police declined to comment further on the traffic stop or to say when charges would be filed. “I made a mistake for which I am embarrassed and deeply sorry. It will not happen again. I intend to work hard to regain the trust of my constituents,” Nesbit said in the release.
