= Dick Stevenson =

American politician

Richard R. Stevenson
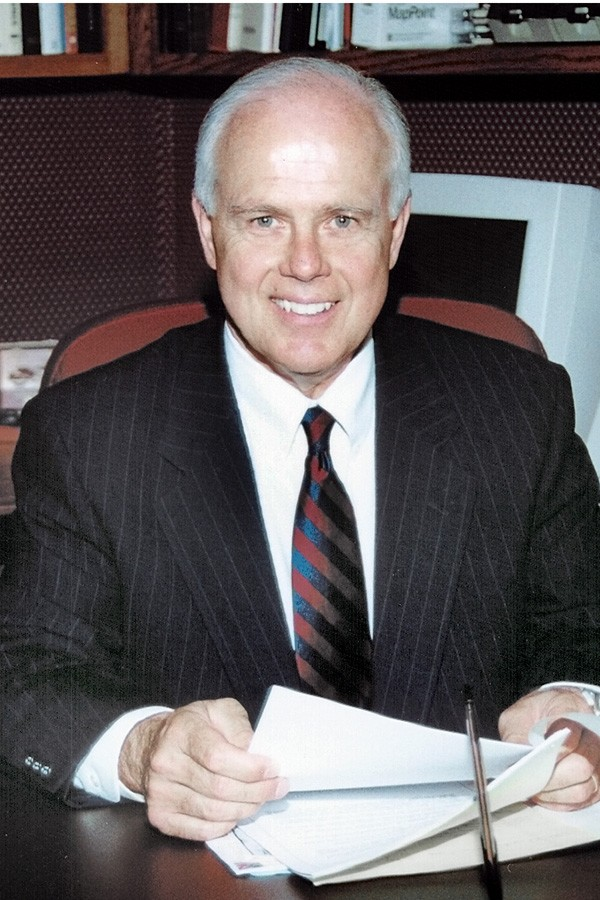

Member of the Pennsylvania House of Representatives from the 8th district
- In office January 2, 2001 – January 6, 2015
- Preceded by: Howard L. Fargo
- Succeeded by: Tedd Nesbit

Personal details
- Born: February 11, 1945 (age 81) Mercer, Pennsylvania, U.S.
- Party: Republican
- Education: St. Francis College (BA); Suffolk University (MBA)

Military service
- Allegiance: United States
- Branch/service: United States Air Force
- Years of service: 1968–1972
- Rank: Sergeant

Richard R. Stevenson (born February 11, 1945) is an American former member of the Pennsylvania House of Representatives, elected in 2000 to represent the 8th District. He retired in 2014.

During his time in the legislature, Stevenson served on the House Appropriations, Judiciary and Professional Licensure Committees.

== Career ==
Stevenson served for eight years on the borough council of Grove City, Pennsylvania from 1985 to 1993, including five years as the council president. In 1996, Stevenson joined the Mercer County Board of Commissioners and was elected chairman.

Stevenson was first elected to the House in 2000 to replace Howard Fargo. That year, he defeated the Armstrong County district attorney, George Kepple, in the Republican primary election with 55% of the vote. In the general election, Stevenson defeated James Coulter, taking over 63% of the vote.

Stevenson won re-election to each succeeding session of the House. Beginning in 2004, he ran unopposed in the primary and general elections.

== Personal ==
Stevenson served in the United States Air Force from 1968 to 1972 and became a sergeant. He served as Korean Language Specialist with the Air Force Security Service. Stevenson received a Bachelor of Arts degree from St. Francis College in New York and a Master of Business Administration from Suffolk University in Massachusetts. He and his wife have two children, Sarah Hatfield and Emily Vallozzi, and six grandchildren.
