= West Liberty, Pennsylvania =

Borough in Pennsylvania, US

- Borough
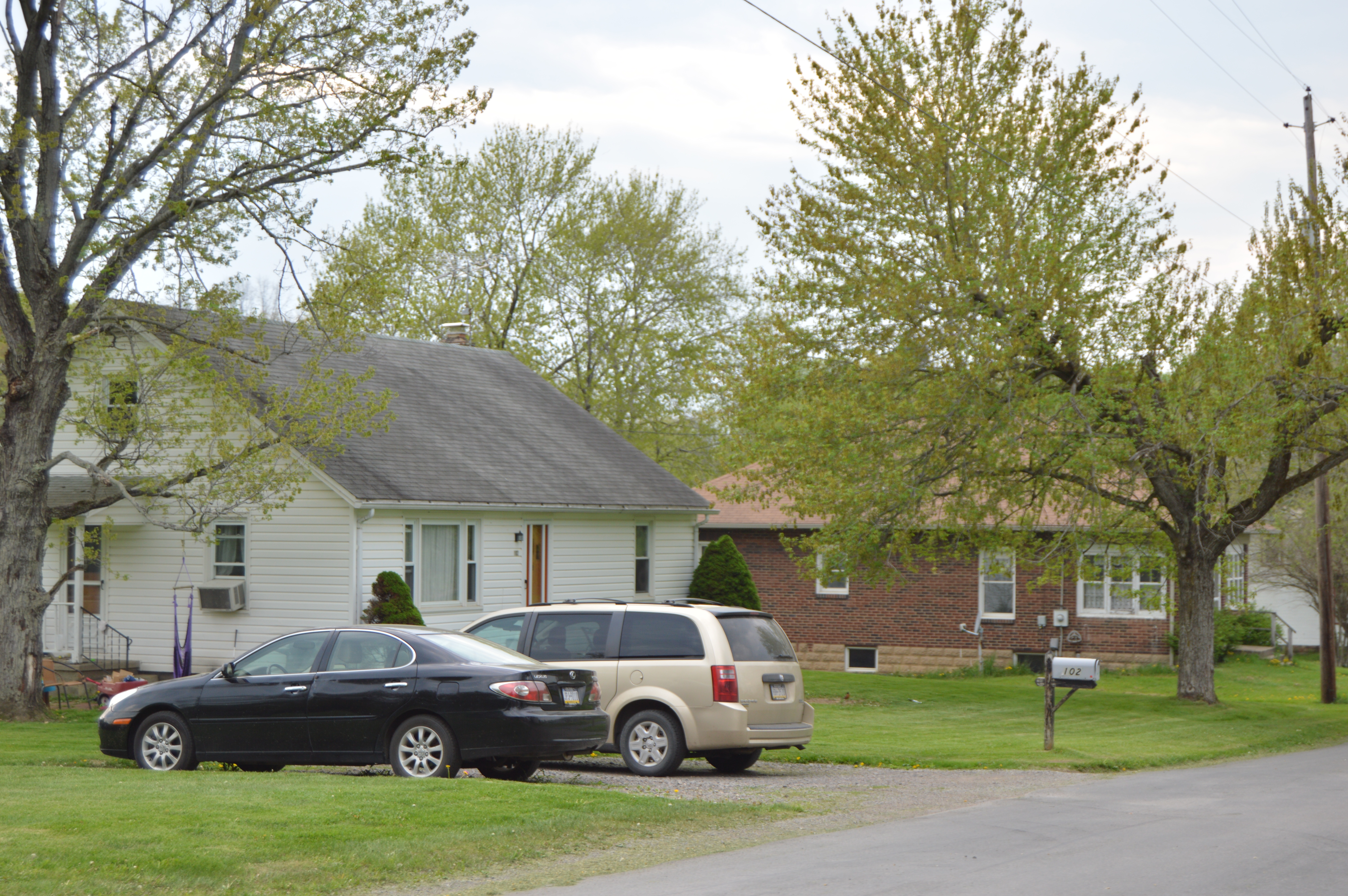
- Houses at the center of the community

- Location of West Liberty in Butler County, Pennsylvania.

- Location within Pennsylvania
- Coordinates: 41°00′34″N 80°03′33″W
- Country: United States
- State: Pennsylvania
- County: Butler
- Settled: 1829
- Incorporated: 1903

Government
  - Type: Borough council

Area
  - Total: 3.88 sq mi (10.04 km^{2})
  - Land: 3.85 sq mi (9.97 km^{2})
  - Water: 0.031 sq mi (0.08 km^{2})
- Elevation: 1,210 ft (370 m)

Population (2010)
  - Total: 343
  - Estimate (2019): 330
  - Density: 85.8/sq mi (33.11/km^{2})
- Time zone: UTC-5 (Eastern (EST))
  - Summer (DST): UTC-4 (EDT)
- FIPS code: 42-83376

West Liberty is a borough in Butler County, Pennsylvania, United States. As of the 2020 census, West Liberty had a population of 335.

== Geography ==
West Liberty is located in northwestern Butler County at 41°0′34″N 80°3′33″W (41.009509, −80.059073). It is bordered to the east and south by Brady Township, to the west by Worth Township, and to the north by Slippery Rock Township. The borough includes the main settlement of West Liberty in the valley of Hogue Run but extends north as far as Slippery Rock Creek.

According to the United States Census Bureau, the borough has a total area of 3.9 square miles (10.0 km^{2}), of which 0.031 square miles (0.08 km^{2}), or 0.77%, is water.

== Demographics ==
Historical population
Census	Pop.	Note	%±
1910	199		—
1920	193		−3.0%
1930	191		−1.0%
1940	220		15.2%
1950	245		11.4%
1960	201		−18.0%
1970	224		11.4%
1980	301		34.4%
1990	282		−6.3%
2000	325		15.2%
2010	343		5.5%
2020	335		−2.3%

As of the 2000 census, there were 325 people, 118 households, and 92 families residing in the borough. The population density was 83.1 inhabitants per square mile (32.1/km^{2}). There were 123 housing units at an average density of 31.4 per square mile (12.1/km^{2}). The racial makeup of the borough was 99.38% White, 0.31% Asian, and 0.31% from two or more races.

There were 118 households, out of which 31.4% had children under the age of 18 living with them, 66.9% were married couples living together, 5.1% had a female householder with no husband present, and 22.0% were non-families. 16.9% of all households were made up of individuals, and 8.5% had someone living alone who was 65 years of age or older. The average household size was 2.75 and the average family size was 3.07.

In the borough the population was spread out, with 24.3% under the age of 18, 9.2% from 18 to 24, 28.6% from 25 to 44, 26.5% from 45 to 64, and 11.4% who were 65 years of age or older. The median age was 36 years. For every 100 females there were 115.2 males. For every 100 females age 18 and over, there were 117.7 males.

The median income for a household in the borough was $45,446, and the median income for a family was $46,354. Males had a median income of $32,813 versus $19,167 for females. The per capita income for the borough was $17,133. About 2.9% of families and 6.2% of the population were below the poverty line, including 7.5% of those under age 18 and none of those age 65 or over.

== Education ==
The school district is the Slippery Rock Area School District.
