= Howard Fargo =

American politician (1928–2023)

Howard L. Fargo

Member of the Pennsylvania House of Representatives from the 8th district
- In office July 21, 1981 – November 30, 2000
- Preceded by: Roy W. Wilt
- Succeeded by: Dick Stevenson

Personal details
- Born: April 18, 1928 Clearfield, Pennsylvania, U.S.
- Died: December 22, 2023 (aged 95) Summerfield, Florida, U.S.
- Party: Republican
- Spouse: June Fargo
- Children: Linda Fargo, Douglas Fargo
- Education: Indiana University of Pennsylvania; Pennsylvania State University
- Occupation: CPA-Legislator

Howard Lynn Fargo (April 18, 1928 – December 22, 2023) was an American politician who was a Republican member of the Pennsylvania House of Representatives, where he represented the 8th legislative district.

Fargo graduated from Clearfield High School in 1946 and from the Indiana University of Pennsylvania in 1951. He earned an M.Ed. from Penn State University in 1957. Prior to elective office, he worked as a Certified Public Accountant in his own practice and served as the treasurer of the Mercer County Republican Committee. He was first elected to the Pennsylvania House of Representatives on June 23, 1981 in special election to fill the remainder of Roy W. Wilt's term, who was elected to the Pennsylvania Senate. Fargo was sworn into office on July 21, 1981. He was one of the speakers at the first Pennsylvania Leadership Conference in 1989. He served in the House Republican leadership as Caucus Administrator from 1989 through 1994; he served as Caucus Chairman from 1995 though his retirement in 2000. He was awarded the Indiana University of Pennsylvania Distinguished Alumni award. He died in Summerfield, Florida on December 22, 2023, at the age of 95.
