= Prospect, Pennsylvania =

Borough in Pennsylvania, US

- Borough
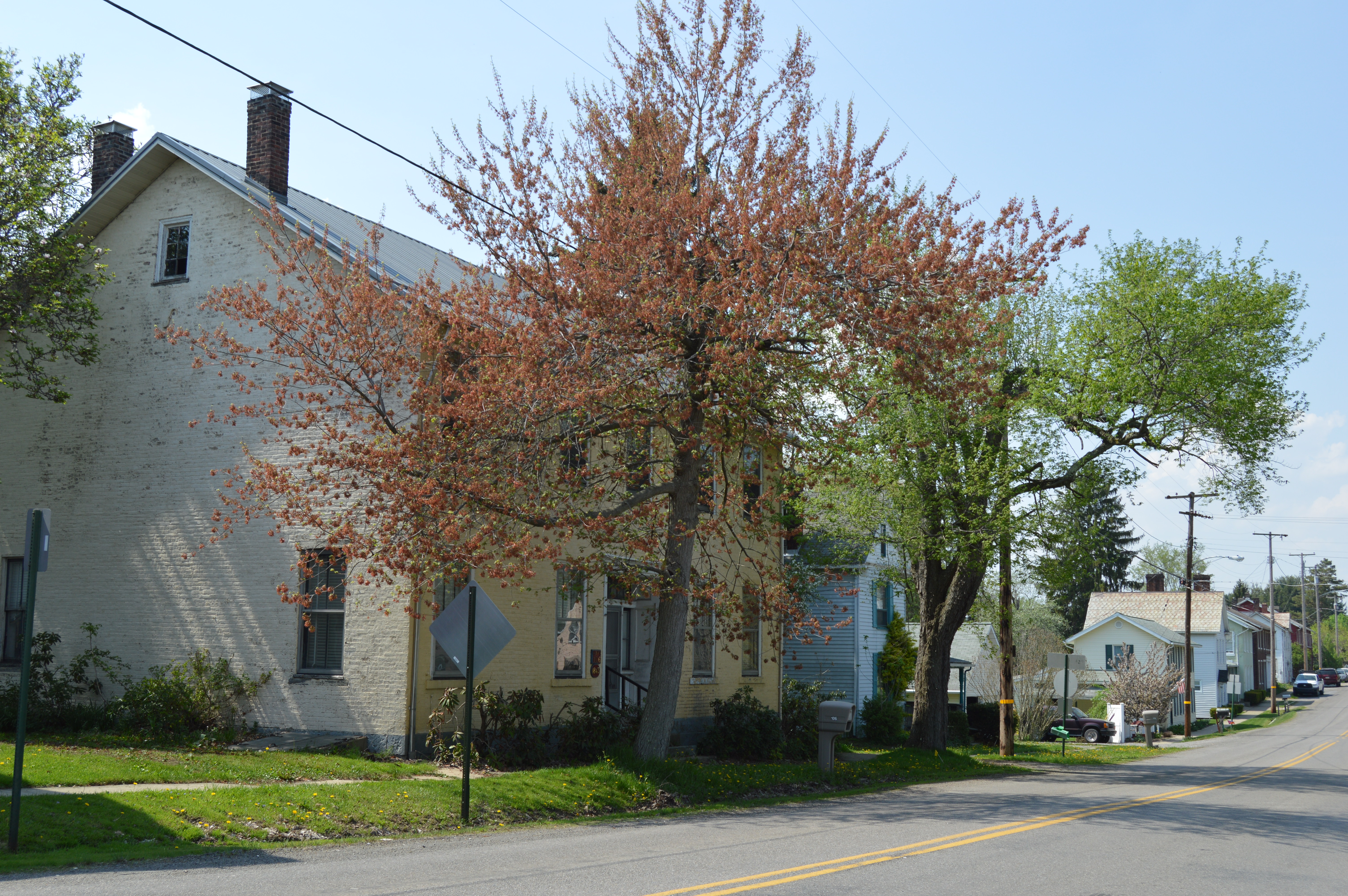
- Franklin Street north of Main Street

- Location of Prospect in Butler County, Pennsylvania.

- Location within Pennsylvania
- Coordinates: 40°54′15″N 80°02′47″W
- Country: United States
- State: Pennsylvania
- County: Butler
- Settled: 1797
- Incorporated: 1825

Government
  - Type: Borough Council

Area
  - Total: 4.08 sq mi (10.57 km^{2})
  - Land: 4.08 sq mi (10.57 km^{2})
  - Water: 0 sq mi (0.00 km^{2})

Population (2020)
  - Total: 1,123
  - Density: 275.1/sq mi (106.21/km^{2})
- Time zone: UTC-5 (Eastern (EST))
  - Summer (DST): UTC-4 (EDT)
- Zip code: 16052
- FIPS code: 42-62752
- Website: prospectborough.com

Prospect is a borough in Butler County, Pennsylvania, United States. As of the 2020 census, Prospect had a population of 1,123.

== Geography ==
Prospect is located in western Butler County at 40°54′15″N 80°2′47″W (40.904113, −80.046430). U.S. Route 422, a limited-access highway, cuts across the northeastern corner of the borough, leading east 11 miles (18 km) to Butler, the county seat, and west 14 miles (23 km) to New Castle. Moraine State Park, a recreation destination surrounding Lake Arthur, is next to the northwestern border of the borough.

According to the United States Census Bureau, Prospect has a total area of 4.1 square miles (10.6 km^{2}), all land.

== Demographics ==
Historical population
Census	Pop.	Note	%±
1850	254		—
1860	272		7.1%
1870	271		−0.4%
1880	362		33.6%
1890	343		−5.2%
1900	361		5.2%
1910	346		−4.2%
1920	395		14.2%
1930	455		15.2%
1940	574		26.2%
1950	726		26.5%
1960	903		24.4%
1970	973		7.8%
1980	1,016		4.4%
1990	1,122		10.4%
2000	1,234		10.0%
2010	1,169		−5.3%
2020	1,123		−3.9%

As of the 2000 census, there were 1,234 people, 501 households, and 359 families residing in the borough. The population density was 258.4 inhabitants per square mile (99.8/km^{2}). There were 518 housing units at an average density of 108.5 per square mile (41.9/km^{2}). The racial makeup of the borough was 99.35% White, 0.08% Native American, 0.08% Pacific Islander, and 0.49% from two or more races. Hispanic or Latino of any race were 0.41% of the population.

There were 501 households, out of which 34.5% had children under the age of 18 living with them, 58.3% were married couples living together, 10.0% had a female householder with no husband present, and 28.3% were non-families. 24.2% of all households were made up of individuals, and 9.4% had someone living alone who was 65 years of age or older. The average household size was 2.46 and the average family size was 2.92.

In the borough the population was spread out, with 24.2% under the age of 18, 8.0% from 18 to 24, 31.0% from 25 to 44, 24.1% from 45 to 64, and 12.6% who were 65 years of age or older. The median age was 38 years. For every 100 females there were 100.3 males. For every 100 females age 18 and over, there were 96.8 males.

The median income for a household in the borough was $33,452, and the median income for a family was $40,417. Males had a median income of $33,125 versus $21,298 for females. The per capita income for the borough was $17,435. About 6.1% of families and 8.1% of the population were below the poverty line, including 12.2% of those under age 18 and 7.2% of those age 65 or over.

== Education ==
It is in the Slippery Rock Area School District.

== Notable people ==
- Rube Waddell, early 20th-century baseball Hall of Fame left-handed pitcher who spent his teen years in Prospect
- Arda Green, biochemist, was born at Prospect in 1899
