= Franklin Township, Butler County, Pennsylvania =

Township in Pennsylvania, US

Coordinates: 40°54′52″N 80°00′00″W

- Township
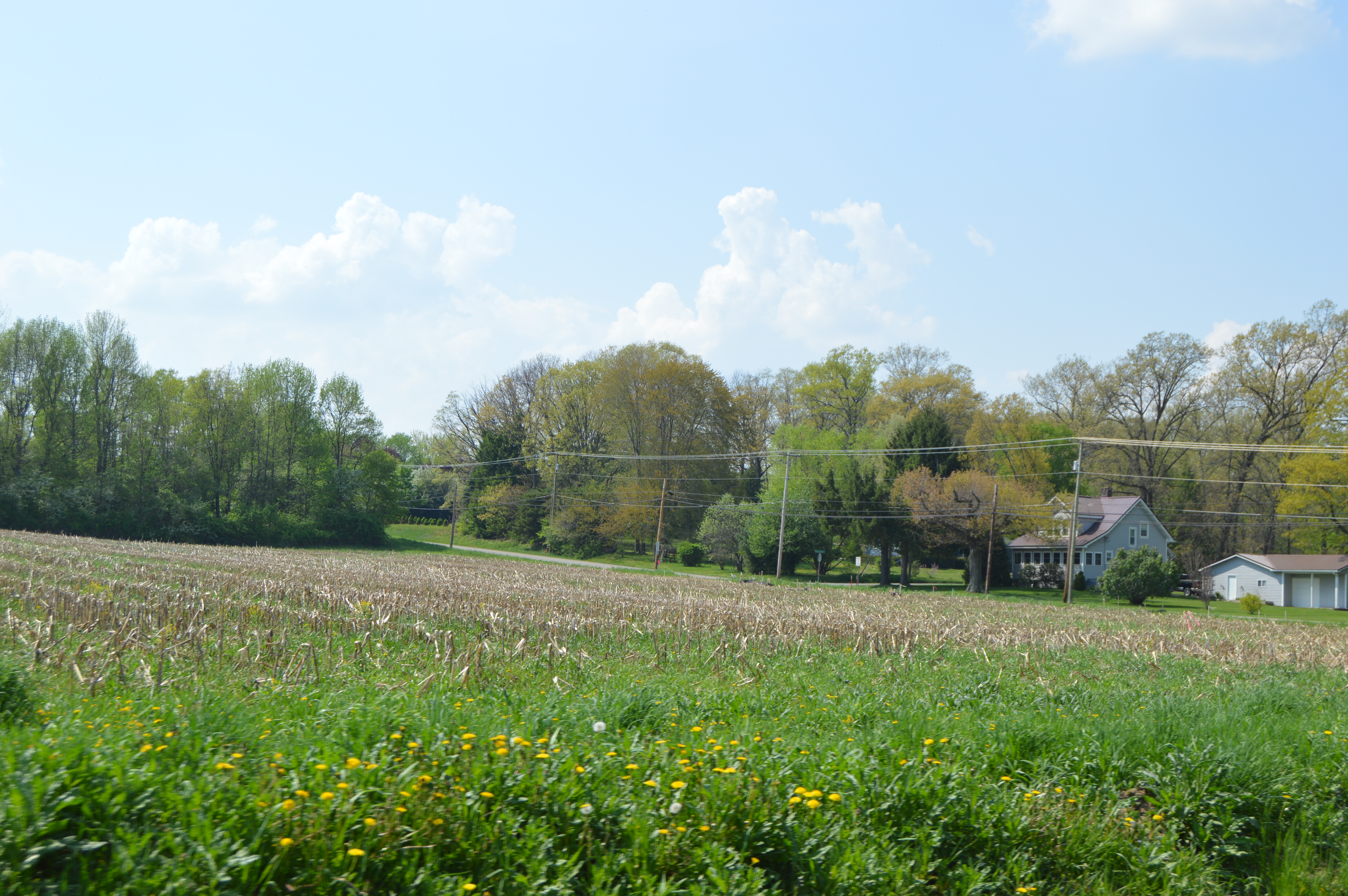
- Fields east of Prospect

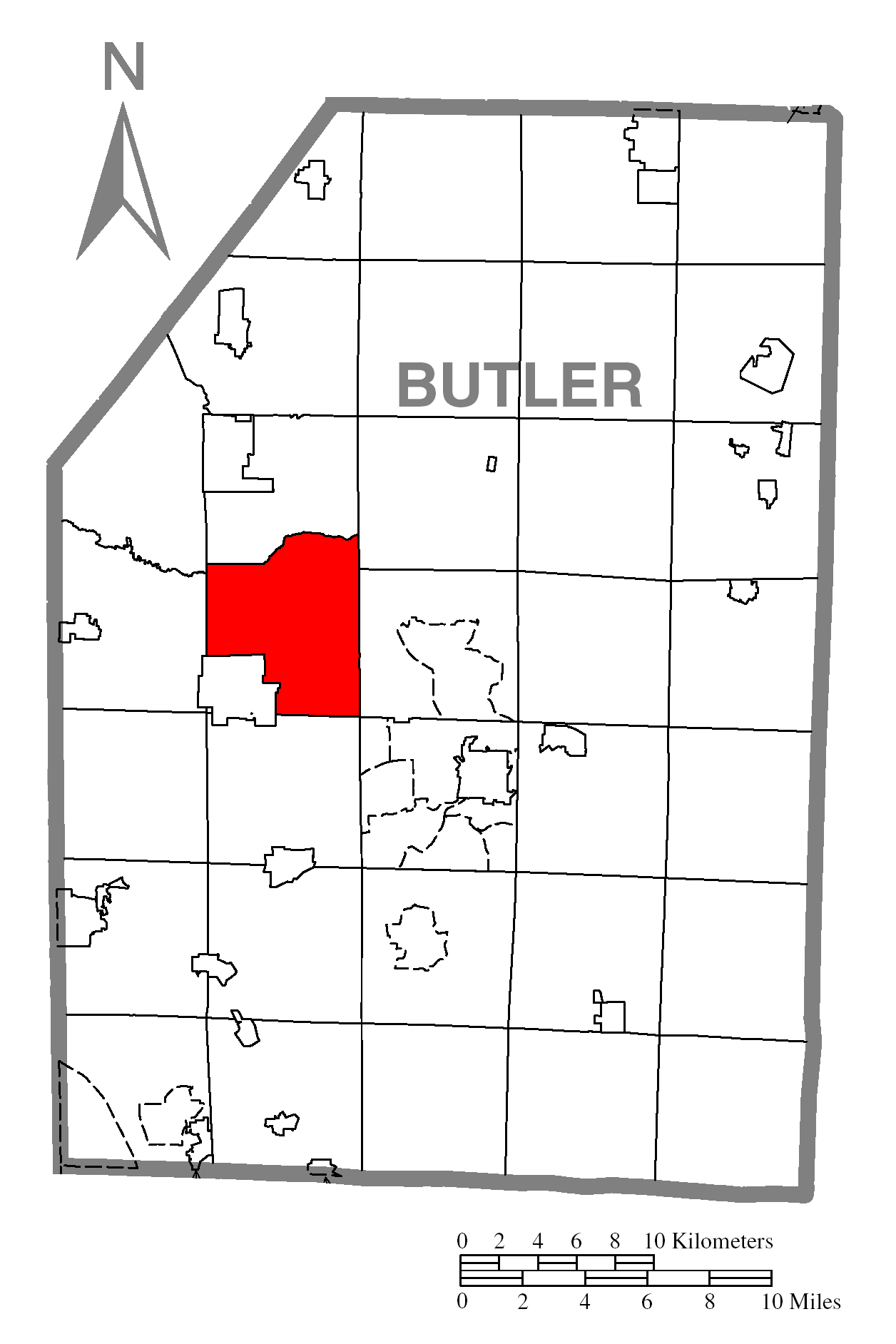
- Map of Butler County, Pennsylvania, highlighting Franklin Township

- Map of Butler County, Pennsylvania
- Country: United States
- State: Pennsylvania
- County: Butler
- Settled: 1795
- Incorporated: 1854

Area
  - Total: 22.88 sq mi (59.26 km^{2})
  - Land: 21.27 sq mi (55.10 km^{2})
  - Water: 1.61 sq mi (4.17 km^{2})

Population (2020)
  - Total: 2,596
  - Estimate (2022): 2,562
  - Density: 126.5/sq mi (48.84/km^{2})
- Time zone: UTC-5 (Eastern (EST))
  - Summer (DST): UTC-4 (EDT)
- FIPS code: 42-019-27352
- Website: franklintwp.net

Franklin Township is a township in Butler County, Pennsylvania, United States. The population was 2,596 at the 2020 census.

== Geography ==
Franklin Township is located in west-central Butler County. It is bordered by Brady Township to the north, Clay Township to the northeast, Center Township to the east, Butler Township at the southeastern corner, Connoquenessing Township to the south, the borough of Prospect to the west and south, Muddy Creek Township to the west, and Worth Township to the northwest. The unincorporated community of Mount Chestnut is in the southeastern part of the township, along U.S. Route 422. Lake Arthur, a reservoir on Muddy Creek, is located in the northern part of the township, with Moraine State Park surrounding the lake.

According to the United States Census Bureau, the township has a total area of 22.9 square miles (59.3 km^{2}), of which 21.3 square miles (55.1 km^{2}) is land and 1.6 square miles (4.2 km^{2}), or 7.03%, is water.

== Demographics ==
Historical population
Census	Pop.	Note	%±
2010	2,620		—
2020	2,596		−0.9%
2022 (est.)	2,562		−1.3%
U.S. Decennial Census

As of the 2000 census, there were 2,292 people, 890 households, and 687 families residing in the township. The population density was 110.3 inhabitants per square mile (42.6/km^{2}). There were 912 housing units at an average density of 43.9 per square mile (16.9/km^{2}). The racial makeup of the township was 98.95% White, 0.09% African American, 0.13% Asian, 0.17% Pacific Islander, 0.13% from other races, and 0.52% from two or more races. Hispanic or Latino of any race were 0.35% of the population.

There were 890 households, out of which 30.4% had children under the age of 18 living with them, 66.5% were married couples living together, 7.1% had a female householder with no husband present, and 22.7% were non-families. 19.6% of all households were made up of individuals, and 6.9% had someone living alone who was 65 years of age or older. The average household size was 2.58 and the average family size was 2.94.

In the township the population was spread out, with 21.9% under the age of 18, 7.2% from 18 to 24, 28.8% from 25 to 44, 30.6% from 45 to 64, and 11.5% who were 65 years of age or older. The median age was 41 years. For every 100 females there were 103.2 males. For every 100 females age 18 and over, there were 100.6 males.

The median income for a household in the township was $47,337, and the median income for a family was $51,603. Males had a median income of $36,458 versus $25,909 for females. The per capita income for the township was $19,712. About 4.8% of families and 6.1% of the population were below the poverty line, including 3.3% of those under age 18 and 14.2% of those age 65 or over.
