= Portersville, Pennsylvania =

Borough in Pennsylvania, US

- Borough
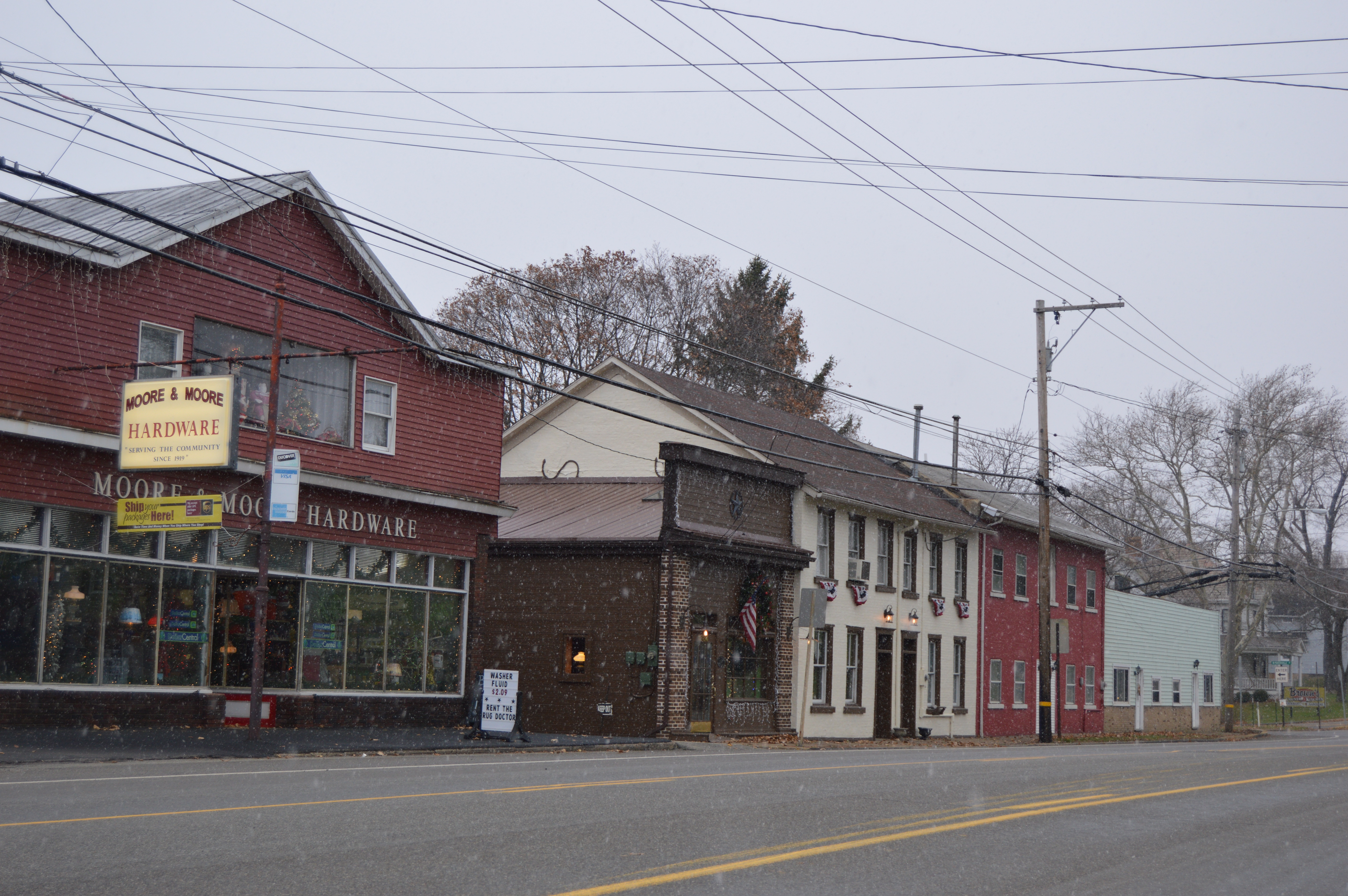
- Commercial district

- Location of Portersville in Butler County, Pennsylvania.

- Location within Pennsylvania
- Coordinates: 40°55′31″N 80°08′39″W
- Country: United States
- State: Pennsylvania
- County: Butler
- Settled: 1826
- Incorporated: 1844

Government
  - Type: Borough Council

Area
  - Total: 0.80 sq mi (2.06 km^{2})
  - Land: 0.80 sq mi (2.06 km^{2})
  - Water: 0 sq mi (0.00 km^{2})

Population (2020)
  - Total: 231
  - Density: 290.4/sq mi (112.12/km^{2})
- Time zone: UTC-5 (Eastern (EST))
  - Summer (DST): UTC-4 (EDT)
- Zip code: 16051
- FIPS code: 42-62224

Portersville is a borough in Butler County, Pennsylvania, United States. As of the 2020 census, Portersville had a population of 231.

== History ==
The area that would become Portersville was originally settled in the early 19th century as part of Muddy Creek Township in Butler County, Pennsylvania.

The first recorded village name was Stewartsville, likely named after the first settler, Robert S. Stewart, who arrived in 1796. His son, Robert Stewart, was born in the village on September 15, 1808. Robert Stewart would later lay out the land in 1828, when several settlers constituted the borough, including Thomas Christy, James Stewart, John Stewart, Thomas Brandon, Dr. Cowden, James Cowden, and Robert Craig with their families.

The first post office was established between 1826-1828. The first postmaster, John Stewart, held the position for ten years, when he was succeeded by Robert Craig. The post office was moved to a building opposite of Brenneman Hotel in 1838.

During the establishment of the post office, it is believed that Stewartsville was renamed to Portersville, in honor of the 9th Governor of Pennsylvania, David R. Porter. However, Porter was not sworn into office until January 1839, and he is the only namesake to serve as Governor of Pennsylvania. It is more plausible that the borough was renamed after the post office moved in 1838, when Porter would have been elected and incumbent as Governor.

The first merchant in the borough was Robert Craig, who established a general store in 1829. By 1882, there were six stores in operation throughout the borough, including two grocery stores, two dry goods stores, one millinery, and one drug store.

In 1845, Portersville Village was incorporated as a borough, and the first election was held in a small frame building called the Town Hall. The first Justices of the Peace were James Hall and Robert Stewart, who refused to accept his commission, but Mr. Hall served in the capacity for several terms in succession. The first constable was William Sharp, who continued to be elected for several terms.

== Geography ==
Portersville is located near the western border of Butler County at 40°55′31″N 80°8′39″W (40.925285, −80.144229). It is surrounded by Muddy Creek Township, though the borough's western border comes within 660 feet (200 m) of the Lawrence County line.

U.S. Route 19, Perry Highway, passes through the center of the borough, leading north 22 miles (35 km) to Mercer and south 9.5 miles (15.3 km) to Zelienople. Interstate 79 passes just east of the borough, with access from Exit 96 (PA 488). I-79 leads south 38 miles (61 km) to Pittsburgh and north 90 miles (140 km) to Erie. Moraine State Park, situated around Lake Arthur, is a short distance east of I-79. Portersville lies between the cities of Butler 15 miles (24 km) east and New Castle 14 miles (23 km) to the west.

According to the United States Census Bureau, the borough has a total area of 0.81 square miles (2.1 km^{2}), all land.

== Emergency services ==
Portersville has a no police force, an ambulance service, and a volunteer fire department. The Ambulance Service, Portersville EMS, and the Volunteer Fire Department, Portersville/Muddy Creek Township Volunteer Fire Department cover the Portersville area to include Muddy Creek Township, parts of Perry Township in Lawrence County, parts of Slippery Rock Township in Lawrence County, as well as Parts of Franklin Township in Butler County.

== Events ==
Portersville has several events each year in the immediate and surrounding areas. The Portersville Steam Show occurs three times a year (May, August, and October). This event displays older steam engines and farm machinery to the public. The Moraine/Lake Arthur Regatta (in August each year) has water related activities for the entire family. The Pennsic War occurs each summer north of Portersville. McConnells Mill State Park, west of Portersville, holds its Heritage Days in September.

== Demographics ==
Historical population
Census	Pop.	Note	%±
1850	240		—
1870	198		—
1880	216		9.1%
1890	190		−12.0%
1900	196		3.2%
1910	170		−13.3%
1920	155		−8.8%
1930	185		19.4%
1940	276		49.2%
1950	294		6.5%
1960	344		17.0%
1970	292		−15.1%
1980	320		9.6%
1990	307		−4.1%
2000	268		−12.7%
2010	235		−12.3%
2020	231		−1.7%

As of the 2000 census, there were 268 people, 103 households, and 79 families residing in the borough. The population density was 328.4 people per square mile (126.8 people/km^{2}). There were 109 housing units at an average density of 133.6 per square mile (51.6/km^{2}). The racial makeup of the borough was 99.63% White, and 0.37% from two or more races.

There were 103 households, out of which 36.9% had children under the age of 18 living with them, 64.1% were married couples living together, 8.7% had a female householder with no husband present, and 23.3% were non-families. 20.4% of all households were made up of individuals, and 6.8% had someone living alone who was 65 years of age or older. The average household size was 2.60 and the average family size was 3.03.

In the borough the population was spread out, with 26.5% under the age of 18, 6.0% from 18 to 24, 34.3% from 25 to 44, 25.0% from 45 to 64, and 8.2% who were 65 years of age or older. The median age was 37 years. For every 100 females there were 98.5 males. For every 100 females age 18 and over, there were 93.1 males.

The median income for a household in the borough was $37,750, and the median income for a family was $40,536. Males had a median income of $35,625 versus $17,500 for females. The per capita income for the borough was $17,356. About 7.8% of families and 6.4% of the population were below the poverty line, including 9.7% of those under the age of eighteen and none of those sixty five or over.

== Education ==
It is in the Slippery Rock Area School District.
