= Jennings Environmental Education Center =

Pennsylvania state park in Brady Township, Butler County

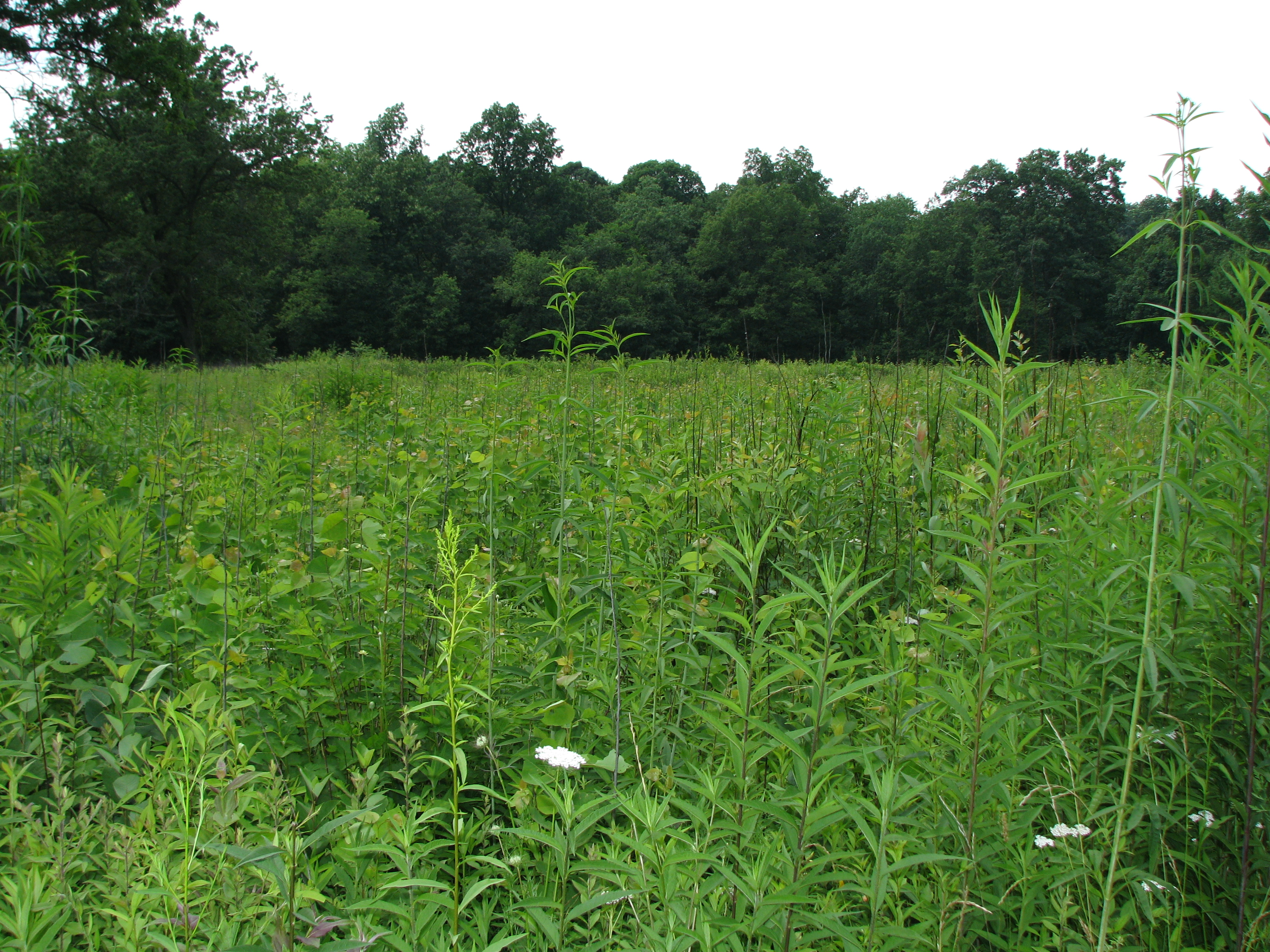
- One of the few prairies in Pennsylvania is found at Jennings Environmental Education Center

- Location within Pennsylvania Location within the United States
- Interactive map of Jennings Environmental Education Center
- Location: Brady Township, Butler County, Pennsylvania, United States
- Coordinates: 41°00′33″N 80°00′13″W
- Area: 333.92 acres (135.13 ha)
- Elevation: 1,197 feet (365 m)
- Established: 1979
- Administrator: Pennsylvania Department of Conservation and Natural Resources
- Named for: Dr. Otto Emery Jennings
- Website: Official website
- Pennsylvania State Parks

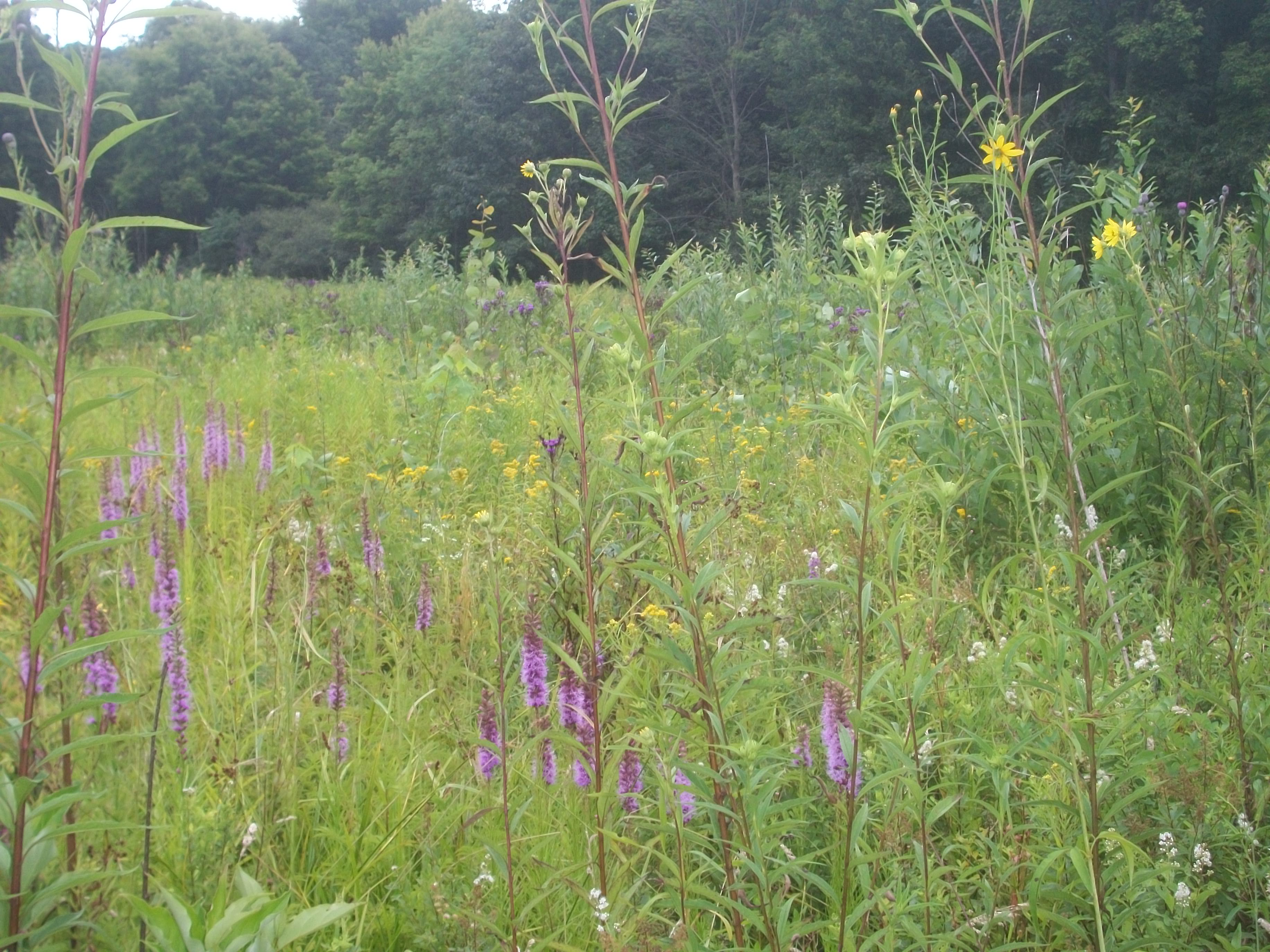
Wildflowers bloom on the Jennings prairie in late July and early August.

Jennings Environmental Education Center is a 334-acre (135 ha) Pennsylvania state park in Brady Township, Butler County, Pennsylvania in the United States. It is 12 miles (19 km) north of Butler at the intersection of Pennsylvania Route 8 and Pennsylvania Route 528. The center contains a relict prairie of 20 acres (8.1 ha), the only publicly protected prairie ecosystem in Pennsylvania. Big Run, a tributary of Slippery Rock Creek, flows through Jennings Environmental Education Center, and it shares a border with Moraine State Park to the south.

Jennings Environmental Education Center was chosen by the Pennsylvania Department of Conservation and Natural Resources (DCNR) and its Bureau of Parks as one of "25 Must-See Pennsylvania State Parks".

== Environmental education ==
The main purpose of Jennings Environmental Education Center is to provide environmental education for the citizens of Pennsylvania and specifically the students of the nearby elementary schools, high schools, colleges, and universities. Jennings stays busy offering hands on opportunities to students and teachers with a "discovery and problem solving" approach. Jennings offers numerous programs to the public throughout the year, many of which are free. Some, such as the National Public Lands Day volunteer project, require pre-registration. The annual Celebrate the Bloom festival, occurring when the blazing star is in peak bloom, began in 2013.

== Prairie ==
Prairies are extremely rare in Pennsylvania. They are usually found further to the west in Ohio, Indiana and across the midwest to the Rocky Mountains. The prairie at Jennings Environmental Education Center is the only protected prairie ecosystem in Pennsylvania. It provides a habitat for plants that are unique to prairie and the endangered massasauga rattlesnake. Jennings Environmental Education Center was the first state park established to protect an endangered plant, the blazing star.

== History ==
This first humans arrived in the Jennings Environmental Education Area nearly 15,000 years ago. These paleo-Indians followed the receding glaciers at the end of the ice age in pursuit of woolly mammoths and giant ground sloths. It is believed that overhunting the mammoths and sloths lead to their eventual extinction.

The Iroquois settled in the area and began to farm the land by the end of the 16th century. They used fire to open areas for farming. This may have helped to sustain the prairie environment that is currently at Jennings Environmental Education Center.

European pioneers from the Thirteen Colonies and New France passed through the area and used the Venango Path an Indian trail, portions of which have since been paved over by Pennsylvania Route 528. The trail extended from Pittsburgh to Franklin. It was used by historical figures such as Tecumseh, Marquis de LaFayette and George Washington.

The area was not heavily settled until the 1800s. The first settlers cleared the land of its standing trees and began farming. The land was not ideal for farming and soon people looked for other uses of the land. They discovered coal and the mining of coal became a booming industry in Western Pennsylvania.

Jennings Environmental Education Center is named for Dr. Otto Emery Jennings. He was a renowned botanist who searched throughout Pennsylvania for unique plant species. He discovered the Prairie in 1905 and was instrumental in the purchase and protection of the area by the Western Pennsylvania Conservancy. Jennings ensured that the area would be protected for the enjoyment and future education of many generations of Pennsylvanians. It became a nature reserve in 1952. Jennings Environmental Education Center was established in 1979.

Directly across Route 8 from the park is the Old Stone House which is owned and operated by Slippery Rock University. The house served as a tavern and inn from 1822 until the mid-1800s. George Washington and Christopher Gist also traveled through the vicinity in 1753 while on their historic mission to Fort LeBoeuf prior to the French and Indian War. Interpretive signs and information regarding Washington's Trail are located in Jennings and at the Old Stone House. The Old Stone House is open on weekends and tours and programs take place regularly throughout the year. The neighboring Foltz Schoolhouse is located on Jennings property and is in the process of being restored.
