= Brady Township, Butler County, Pennsylvania =

Township in Pennsylvania, US

Coordinates: 40°59′00″N 79°59′29″W

- Township
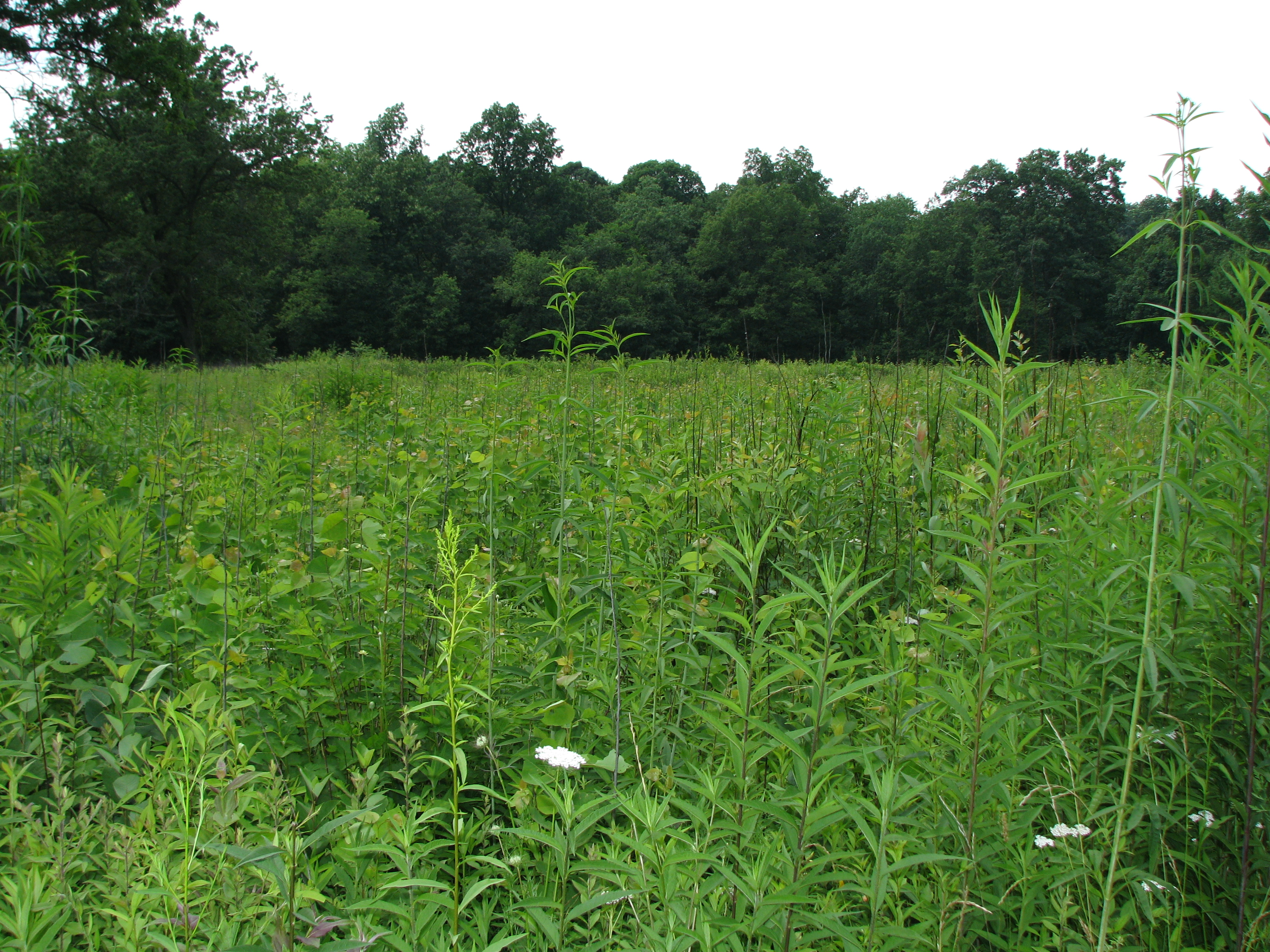
- Jennings Environmental Education Center in Brady Township

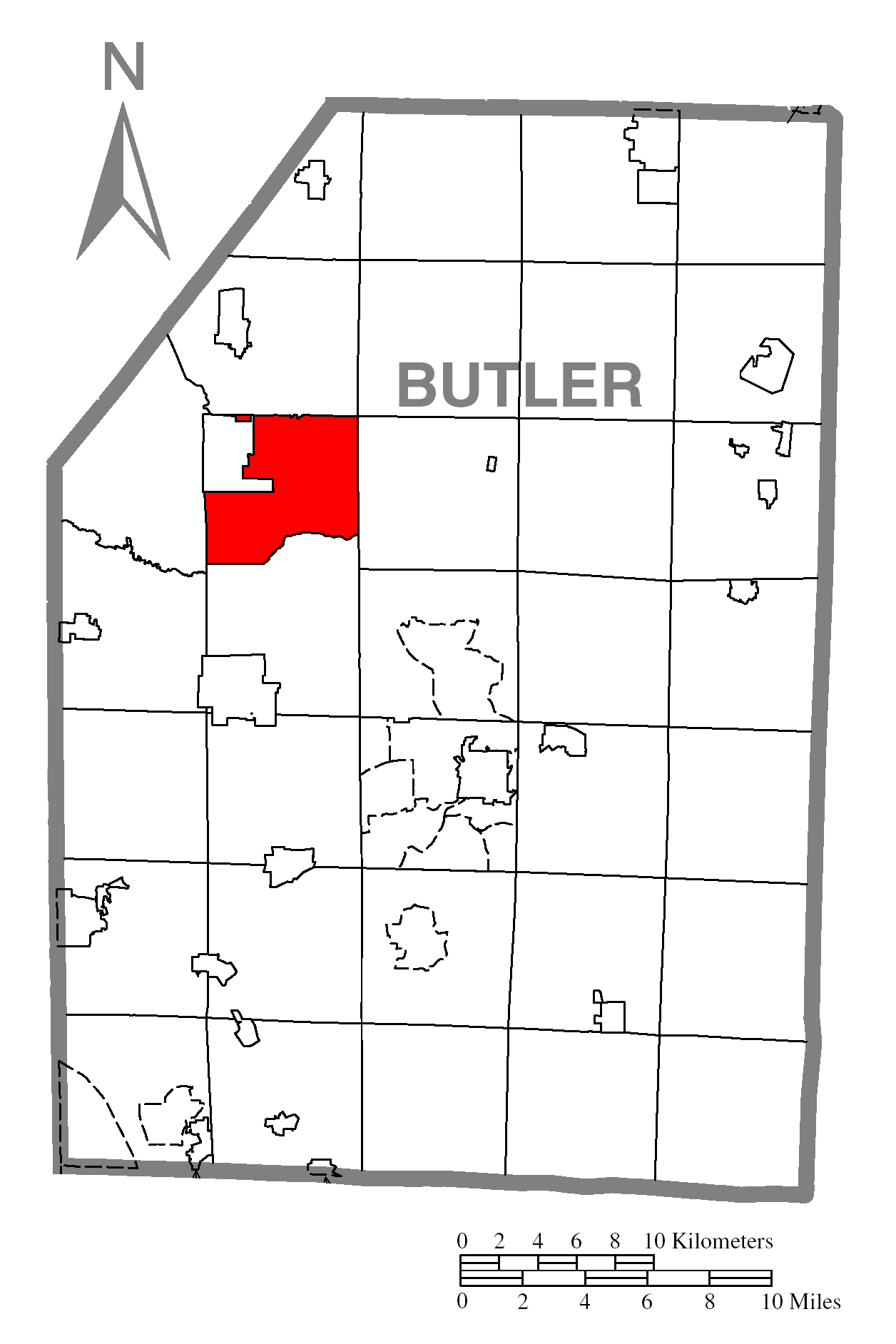
- Map of Butler County, Pennsylvania highlighting Brady Township

- Map of Butler County, Pennsylvania
- Country: United States
- State: Pennsylvania
- County: Butler
- Settled: 1796
- Incorporated: 1854

Area
  - Total: 17.38 sq mi (45.02 km^{2})
  - Land: 17.03 sq mi (44.10 km^{2})
  - Water: 0.36 sq mi (0.93 km^{2})

Population (2020)
  - Total: 1,216 ▼
  - Estimate (2022): 1,195
  - Density: 73.5/sq mi (28.39/km^{2})
- Time zone: UTC-5 (Eastern (EST))
  - Summer (DST): UTC-4 (EDT)
- FIPS code: 42-019-08096
- Website: www.bradytwp.us

Brady Township is a township in Butler County, Pennsylvania, United States. The population was 1,216 at the 2020 census.

== Geography ==
Brady Township is located northwest of the center of Butler County. It is bordered by Slippery Rock Township to the north, Cherry Township at the northeast corner, Clay Township to the east, Franklin Township to the south, Worth Township to the west, and the borough of West Liberty to the north and west. The township includes the unincorporated community of Elora near its eastern border, and the neighborhood of Slippery Rock Park occupies the valley of Slippery Rock Creek at the township's northern border.

According to the United States Census Bureau, the township has a total area of 17.4 square miles (45.0 km^{2}), of which 17.0 square miles (44.1 km^{2}) is land and 0.35 square miles (0.9 km^{2}), or 2.00%, is water.

== Demographics ==
Historical population
Census	Pop.	Note	%±
2010	1,310		—
2020	1,216		−7.2%
2022 (est.)	1,195		−1.7%

As of the 2000 census, there were 1,452 people, 517 households, and 385 families residing in the township. The population density was 86.0 inhabitants per square mile (33.2/km^{2}). There were 600 housing units at an average density of 35.6 per square mile (13.7/km^{2}). The racial makeup of the township was 98.8% White, 0.1% African American, 0.1% Native American, and 0.6% from two or more races. Hispanic or Latino of any race were 0.4% of the population.

There were 517 households, out of which 42.4% had children under the age of 18 living with them, 58.6% were married couples living together, 10.8% had a female householder with no husband present, and 25.5% were non-families. 19.7% of all households were made up of individuals, and 5.6% had someone living alone who was 65 years of age or older. The average household size was 2.80 and the average family size was 3.24.

In the township the population was spread out, with 30.6% under the age of 18, 9.4% from 18 to 24, 32.2% from 25 to 44, 18.9% from 45 to 64, and 8.8% who were 65 years of age or older. The median age was 33 years. For every 100 females, there were 98.9 males. For every 100 females age 18 and over, there were 94.4 males.

The median income for a household in the township was $35,547, and the median income for a family was $38,646. Males had a median income of $30,769 versus $22,708 for females. The per capita income for the township was $14,237. About 12.3% of families and 16.9% of the population were below the poverty line, including 23.2% of those under age 18 and 9.2% of those age 65 or over.
