= Slippery Rock Township, Butler County, Pennsylvania =

Township in Pennsylvania, US

Coordinates: 41°03′46″N 80°01′48″W

- Township
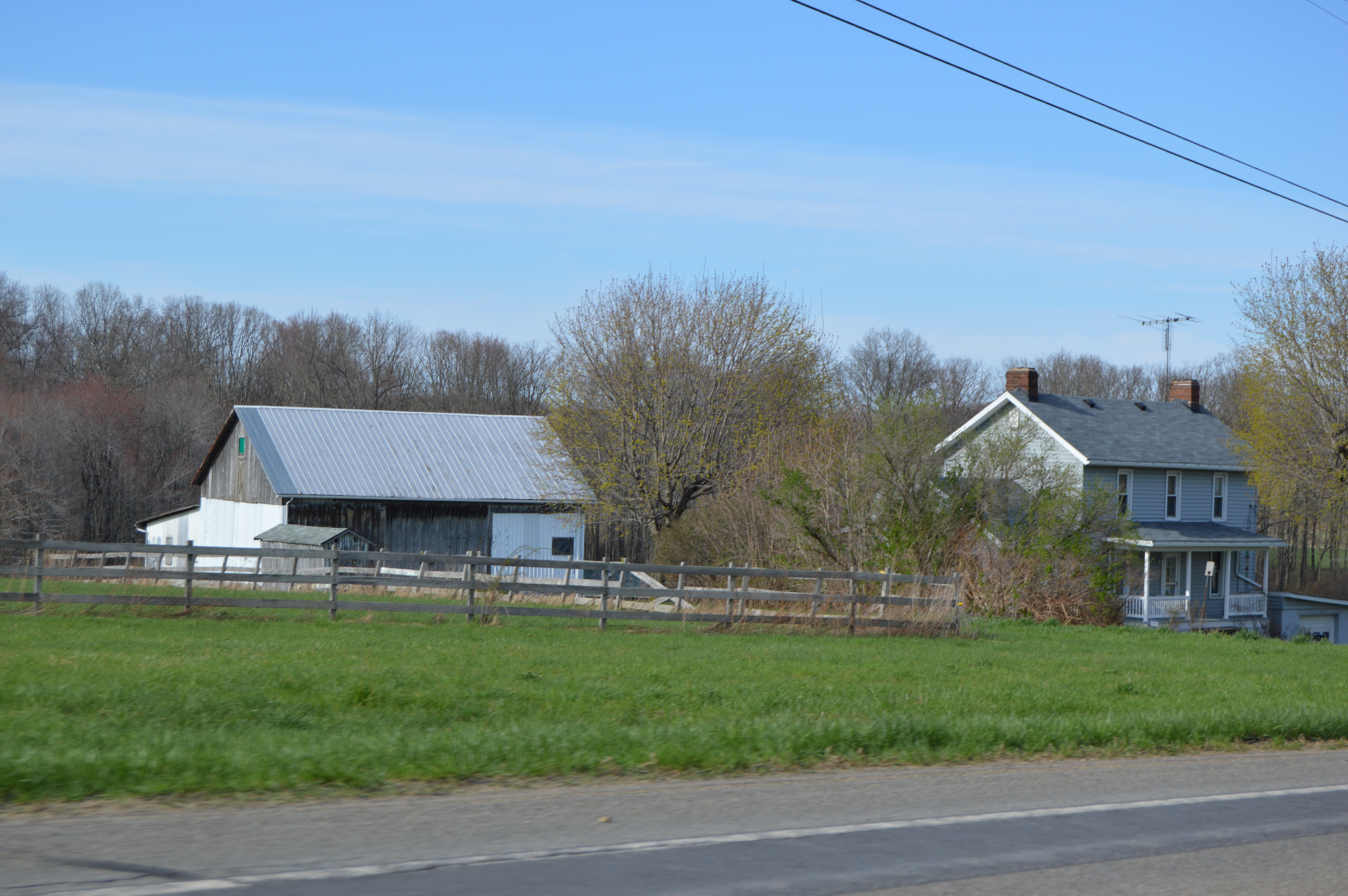
- Farm on Pennsylvania Route 108

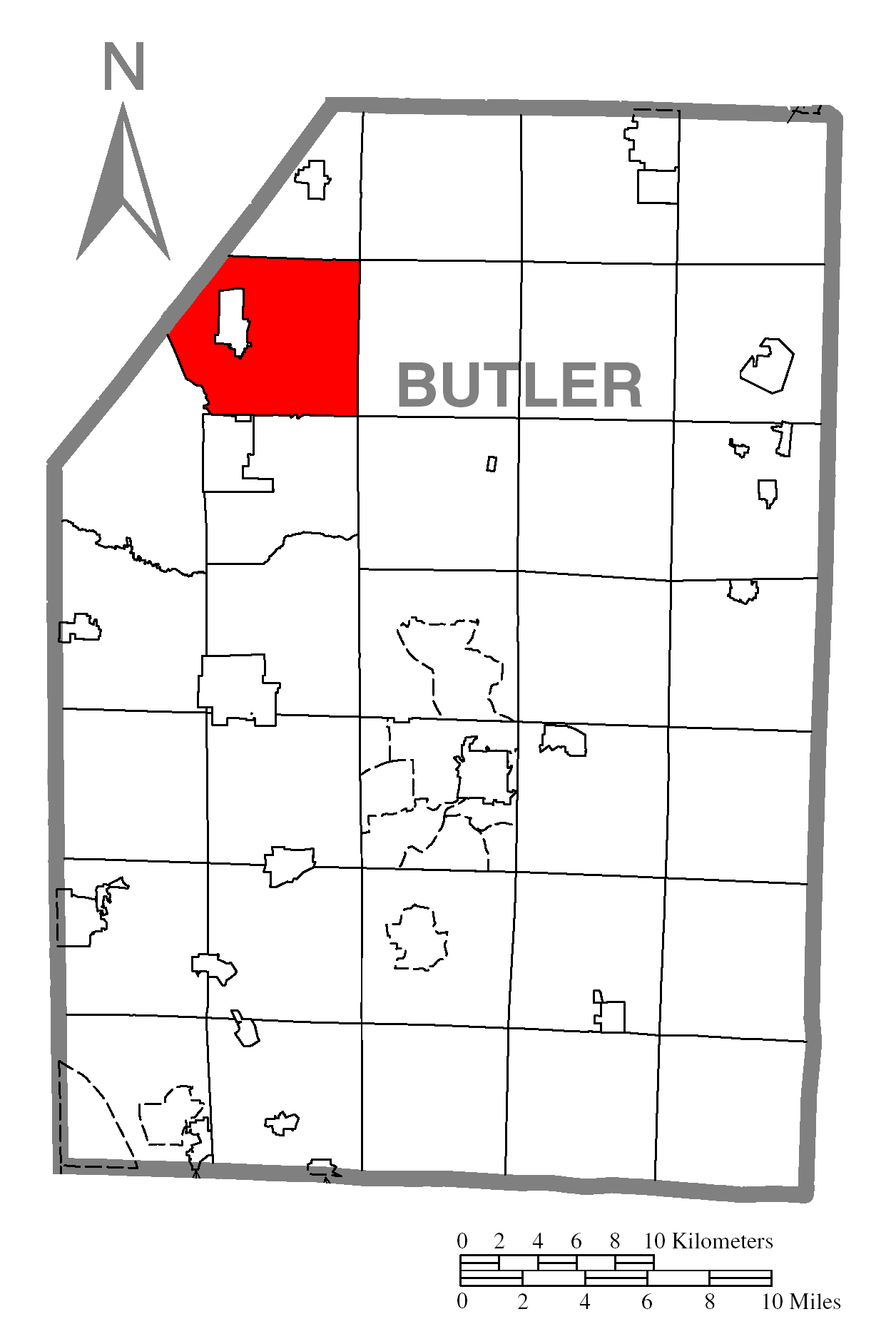
- Map of Butler County, Pennsylvania, highlighting Slippery Rock Township

- Map of Butler County, Pennsylvania
- Country: United States
- State: Pennsylvania
- County: Butler
- Settled: 1796
- Incorporated: 1800

Area
  - Total: 25.69 sq mi (66.54 km^{2})
  - Land: 25.68 sq mi (66.50 km^{2})
  - Water: 0.015 sq mi (0.04 km^{2})

Population (2020)
  - Total: 6,719 ▲
  - Estimate (2022): 8,281
  - Density: 250.4/sq mi (96.69/km^{2})
- Time zone: UTC-5 (Eastern (EST))
  - Summer (DST): UTC-4 (EDT)
- FIPS code: 42-019-71192
- Website: srtwp.com

Slippery Rock Township is a township in Butler County, Pennsylvania, United States. The population was 6,719 at the 2020 census.

The township takes its name from Slippery Rock Creek, which flows through its borders.

== Geography ==
Slippery Rock Township is located along the northwestern border of Butler County, with Mercer and Lawrence counties to the northwest. The township surrounds the borough of Slippery Rock but is a separate entity. Slippery Rock University straddles the border between the township and the borough. The unincorporated community of Doughertys Mills is in the southern part of the township, along Slippery Rock Creek, and Branchton is near the township's eastern border.

According to the United States Census Bureau, the township has a total area of 25.7 square miles (66.5 km^{2}), of which 0.02 square miles (0.04 km^{2}), or 0.06%, is water.

== Demographics ==
Historical population
Census	Pop.	Note	%±
2010	5,614		—
2020	6,719		19.7%
2022 (est.)	8,281		23.2%
U.S. Decennial Census

As of the 2000 census, there were 5,251 people, 1,337 households, and 776 families residing in the township. The population density was 203.1 people per square mile (78.4 people/km^{2}). There were 1,470 housing units at an average density of 56.9 per square mile (22.0/km^{2}). The racial makeup of the township was 95.54% White, 2.29% African American, 0.06% Native American, 1.09% Asian, 0.13% from other races, and 0.90% from two or more races. Hispanic or Latino of any race were 0.72% of the population.

There were 1,337 households, out of which 24.2% had children under the age of 18 living with them, 49.1% were married couples living together, 6.4% had a female householder with no husband present, and 41.9% were non-families. 19.8% of all households were made up of individuals, and 5.6% had someone living alone who was 65 years of age or older. The average household size was 2.52 and the average family size was 2.94.

In the township the population was spread out, with 11.8% under the age of 18, 50.6% from 18 to 24, 16.8% from 25 to 44, 13.5% from 45 to 64, and 7.2% who were 65 years of age or older. The median age was 21 years. For every 100 females there were 94.5 males. For every 100 females age 18 and over, there were 91.8 males.

The median income for a household in the township was $31,223, and the median income for a family was $46,136. Males had a median income of $40,095 versus $23,281 for females. The per capita income for the township was $11,129. About 14.3% of families and 29.4% of the population were below the poverty line, including 7.6% of those under age 18 and 40.9% of those age 65 or over.

== Education ==
The school district is the Slippery Rock Area School District.

The majority of Slippery Rock University is in the township, and this includes the census-designated place.
