= Moraine State Park =

State park in Pennsylvania, United States

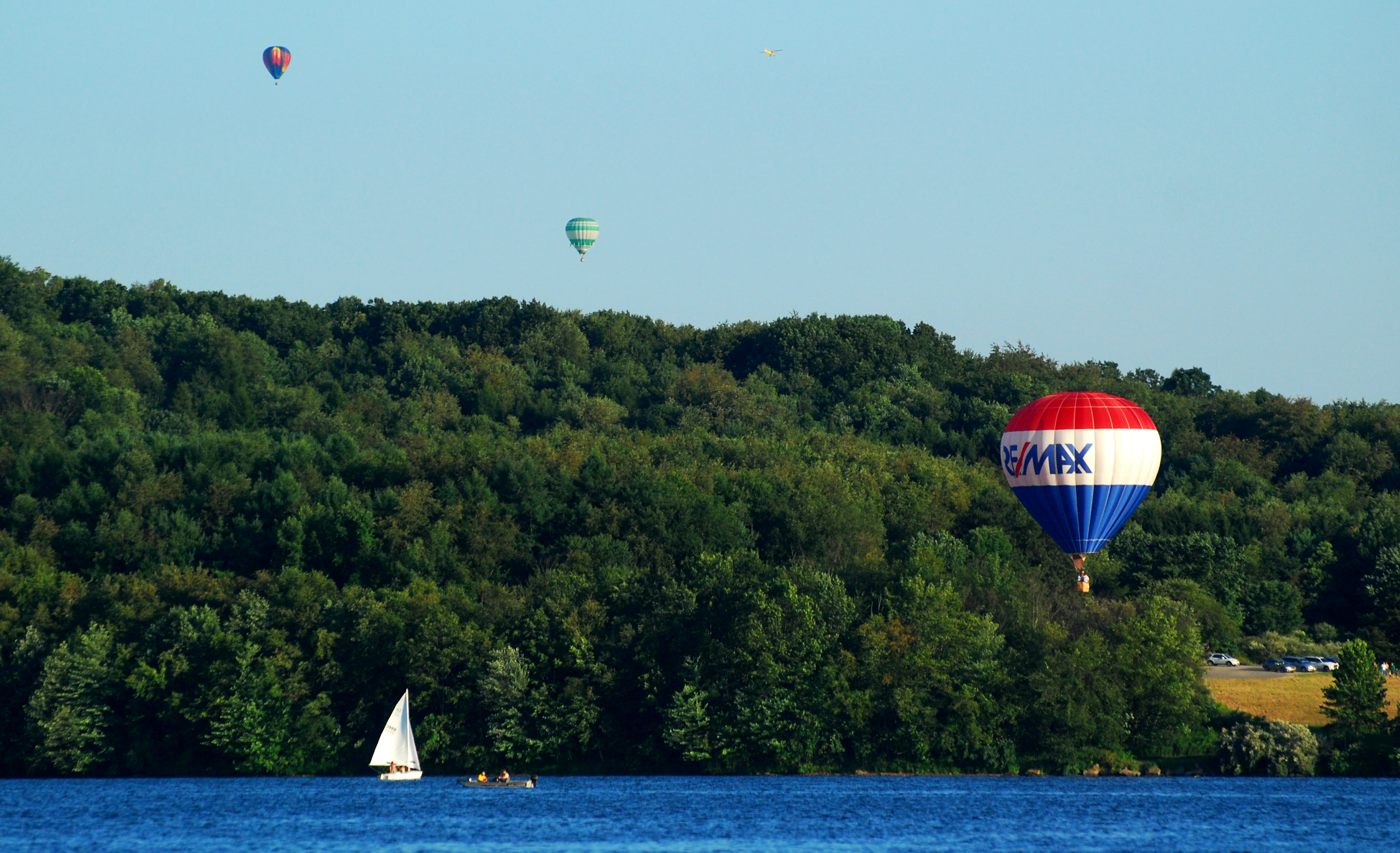

- Location within Pennsylvania Location within the United States
- Interactive map of Moraine State Park
- Location: Butler County, Pennsylvania, United States
- Coordinates: 40°56′22″N 80°05′50″W
- Area: 16,725 acres (6,768 ha)
- Elevation: 1,253 feet (382 m)
- Established: 1970
- Administrator: Pennsylvania Department of Conservation and Natural Resources
- Website: Official website
- Pennsylvania State Parks

Moraine State Park is a Pennsylvania state park on 16,725 acres (6,768 ha) in Brady, Clay, Franklin, Muddy Creek, and Worth townships in Butler County, Pennsylvania.

The park includes a man-made lake, Lake Arthur, formed by impounding Muddy Creek, which is 3,225 acres (1,305 ha) and is used for recreational purposes. The surrounding park is used for hiking, bicycling, group camping, picnicking, and hunting. Moraine State Park hosts the annual Regatta at Lake Arthur in August. The park was the location of the 1973 and 1977 National Scout Jamborees. Moraine State Park is at the intersection of Interstate 79 and U.S. Route 422 and shares a border with Jennings Environmental Education Center to the north.

Moraine State Park was chosen by the Pennsylvania Department of Conservation and Natural Resources (DCNR) and its Bureau of State Parks as one of "25 Must-See Pennsylvania State Parks".

== History ==
Moraine State Park is named for the glacial moraines that cover its land. The moraines were formed at the conclusion of the Last glacial period, a time when glaciers covered much of North America. A tongue of the glacier reached into Pennsylvania and, as the ice receded, left deposits of gravel, sand and clay. These created a landscape of gently rolling hills.

The Erie was the area's dominant Indian tribe until they were all but wiped out by the Iroquois during the Beaver Wars of the 1600s. The French and Dutch demand for beaver pelts gave rise to great struggles for control of the territory between Indian nations as well as later open conflict between the British and French.

English Settlers followed French fur trappers into the Moraine State Park area during the 1700s. George Washington travelled through the park area while he was a young colonel with the Virginia Militia in his attempt to notify the French the area was claimed by the English. Washington most likely stayed twice within park boundaries and was shot at and narrowly escaped being killed by an Indian just south of the park. There is a Pre-Revolutionary cabin behind the Davis Hollow Marina that is the headquarters of the Pennsylvania Chapter of the North Country Trail Association. Visitors may still book an overnight stay at the cabin.

Nearby historic structures also include Old Stone House, a historic tavern and trading stop that has been turned into a museum by Slippery Rock University. McConnell's Mill is a rustic early American grist mill and central attraction at neighboring McConnell's Mill State Park.

Farmers cleared the land of trees and drained the swamps, but farming was difficult due to the glacial till beneath the shallow soil. Other settlers turned to the natural resources left by the glaciers and mined sand and gravel deposits. Limestone and clay mines were opened in the area; shale was discovered and was mined, as well as bituminous coal. Coal mining was a profitable enterprise and seven coal beds were deep mined and later strip mined. Later still, wells were drilled to extract oil and natural gas from deep within the Earth. When the mines were cleared and the wells tapped out, the land was left barren. Since the mines were left uncapped, the topsoil eroded from the land.

The rebirth of the land in and surrounding Moraine State Park can be tied to the efforts of Frank W. Preston who moved to nearby Meridian in 1926. He had emigrated from England to establish a glass research lab. In addition to his work with glass, Preston was also a geologist and naturalist. On a trip to the Muddy Creek Valley he noticed that, despite the barren landscape that had been left by the oil wells and strip mines, the valley had a rich natural history of moraines. Preston worked to form the Western Pennsylvania Conservancy, which used acquired the land which became Moraine State Park, recreated the glacial landscape and preserved open spaces. Muddy Creek was dammed to form Lake Arthur.

The Western Pennsylvania Conservancy worked with the state to reclaim the land. The mines were sealed, over 400 oil and gas wells were capped, and the land that had been stripped was covered again with back fill, and graded to resemble its former condition. The soil was specially treated with fertilizer to allow for the growth of thousands of trees, shrubs and grasses. Lake Arthur was completed in 1970 with the opening of Moraine State Park on May 23, 1970.

=== Environment ===
Moraine State Park is part of the Appalachian mixed mesophytic forests ecoregion.

== Recreation ==
=== Hunting ===
Hunting is permitted on 13,600 acres (5,500 ha) of Moraine State Park. Hunters are expected to follow the rules and regulations of the Pennsylvania Game Commission. The common game species are ruffed grouse, waterfowl, squirrels, pheasants, bear, turkey, white-tailed deer, and rabbits. The hunting of groundhogs is not permitted at the park.

=== Lake Arthur ===
Lake Arthur 40°57′45″N 80°07′19″W is open for year-round recreational enjoyment. It is the home of the Lake Arthur Sailing Club and the Regatta at Lake Arthur. In addition to sailing, the lake is a popular fishing destination, and it has two swimming beaches. Osprey and bald eagles have made nests in the tree tops along Lake Arthur since the mid-1990s.

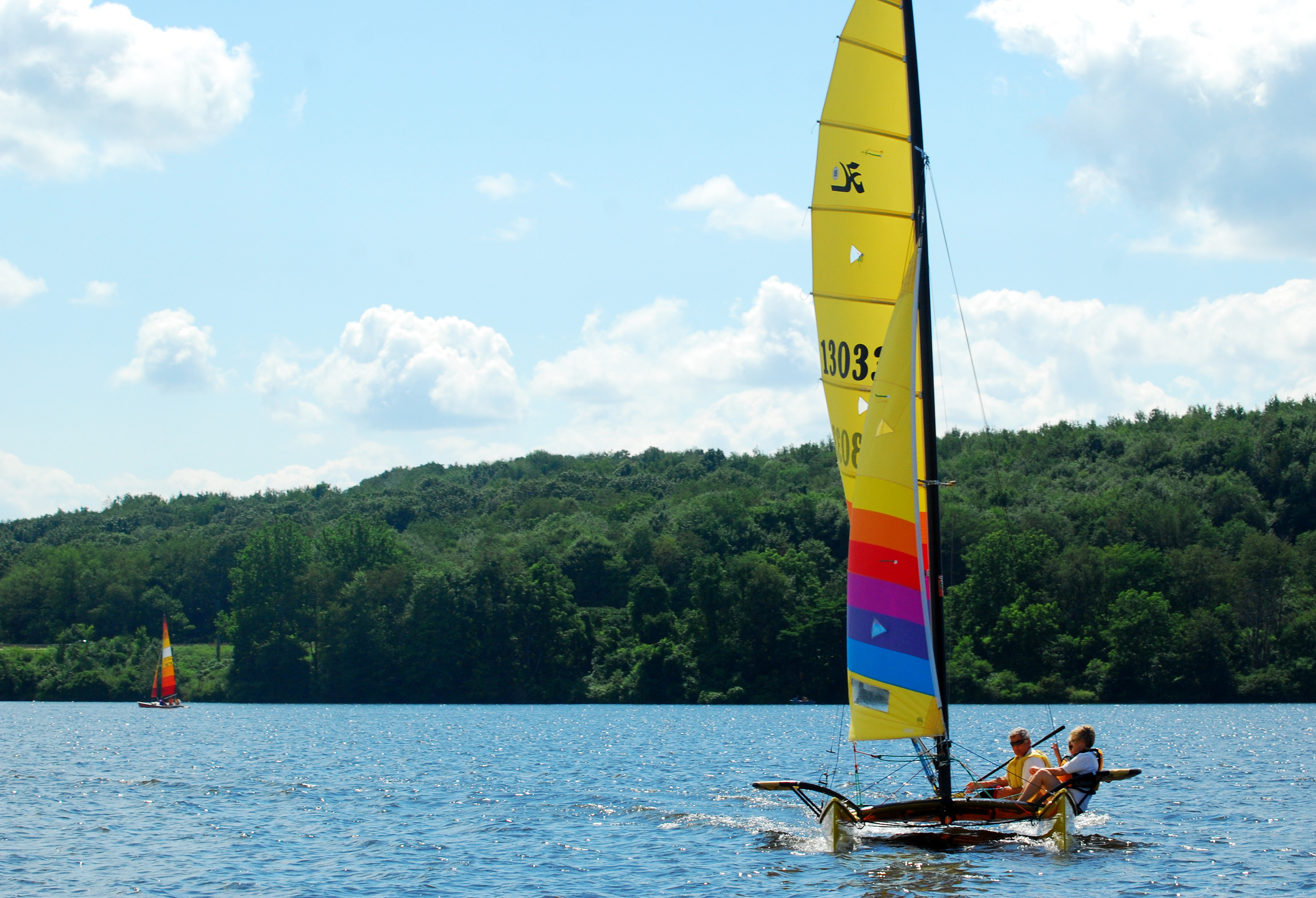
Sailing on Lake Arthur

All boats up to 20 horsepower (15 kW) are permitted on Lake Arthur. All powered boats are prohibited in the Game Propagation Area. Sailing is an especially popular activity. Races and regattas are held over the course of the summers. Sailboats, rowboats, kayaks, motorboats, canoes, and pontoon boats are available to rent in the Crescent Bay Area. There are two fueling points for power boats. Tenants pay to keep boats at the park's two marinas. Davis Hollow houses both pontoons and sailboats, while Watts Bay houses sailboats and catamarans. Both marinas are on the North Shore. All boats must have a current registration from any state or a launch permit from the Pennsylvania Fish and Boat Commission. The lake is open to ice boating during the winter months. Ice boats must display a state park launch permit.

The Moraine Preservation Fund operates a Passenger boat available for tours and dinner cruises of Lake Arthur. The organization also operates a gift shop and has been responsible for re-establishing many bird species, environmental education programs and attaining additional land for the park.

A section of the lake near Barber's Point is very popular for windsurfing. This is due to the higher than normal winds and relatively low boat traffic. All windsurfers are required to have a launch permit. Windsurfing lessons are available.

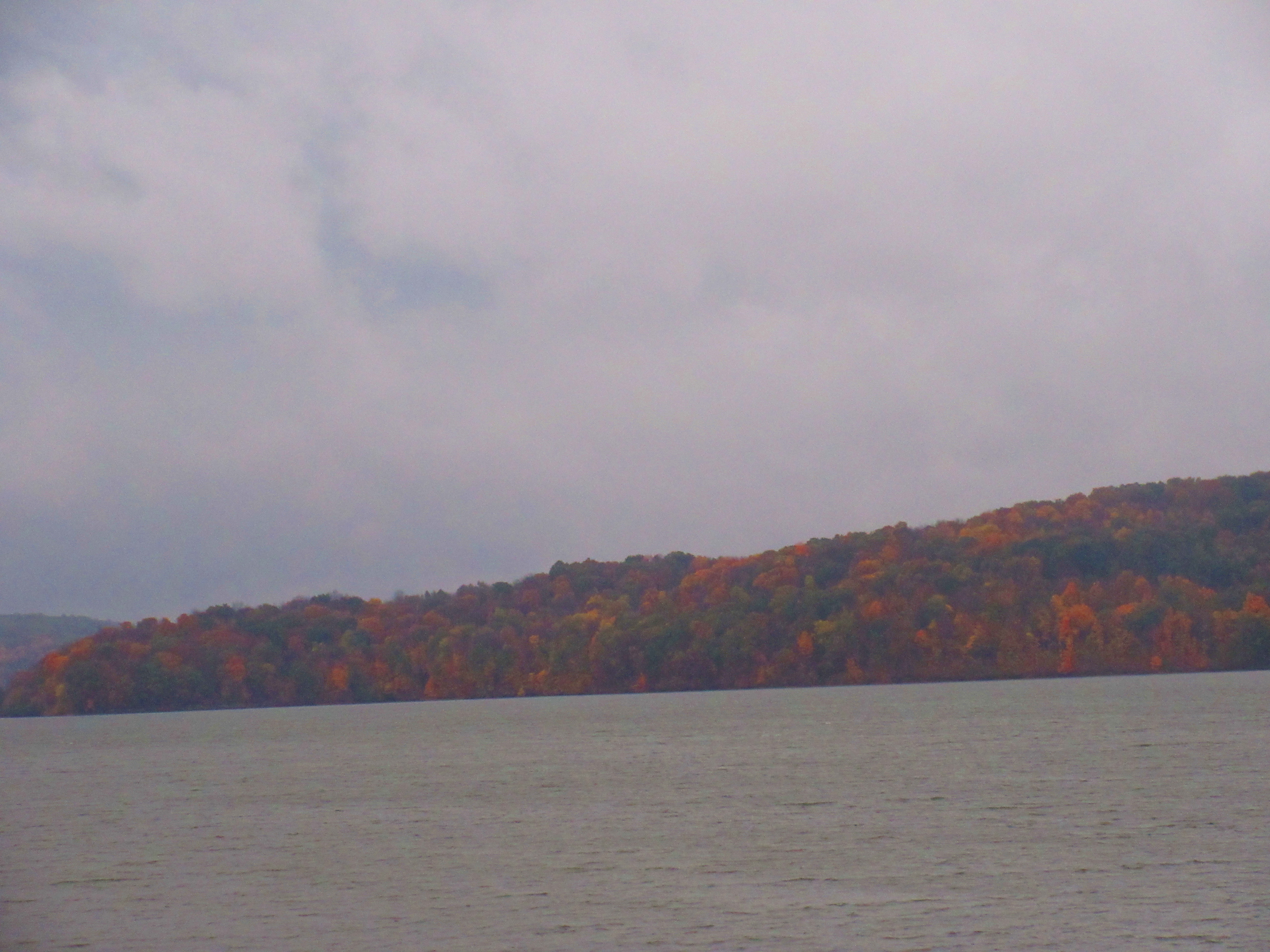
Fall day at Lake Arthur

Lake Arthur is a warm water fishery. The native fish species are largemouth bass, bluegill, black crappie and channel catfish. The fish commission stocks a population of walleye, muskellunge, and striped bass. All anglers are expected to follow the rules and regulations of the Pennsylvania Fish and Boat Commission. Lake Arthur is open during the winter months for ice fishing.

Two beaches at Moraine State Park are open for swimming daily, Memorial Day weekend through Labor Day weekend from 11:00am until 7:00pm. Pleasant Valley Beach on the south shore is a 1,200 foot (365 m) grass and sand beach. It has a paved path that leads into the water and a sand volleyball court is nearby. Lakeview Beach on the north shore is a 550 feet (170 m) long sand beach. Each beach has a bathhouse with showers and a snack stand.

=== Trails ===
The trails at Moraine State Park are all open to hiking. Some are also open to equestrian, cross-country skiing, bicycles, and mountain bikes. The North Country Trail which begins near Lake Champlain in New York passes through the park on its way to Lake Sakakawea in North Dakota. The Butler chapter of the North Country Trail Association maintains the Davis Hollow Cabin, a historic settler's cabin that hikers stop at to sleep and eat.

- Hilltop Trail is a "moderate" hiking trail, 3.0 miles (4.8 km) long. It is marked with green blazes. The trail begins and ends near the Bear Run Boat Launch. The trail is bumpy and grassy in sections before rising to steeper areas. It passes through different stages of forest regeneration, past bluebird houses and the remnants of a spring house. The trail is located on the South Shore,
- Sunken Garden Trail is a "moderate" hiking trail, 3.0 miles (4.8 km) long. It is marked with pink blazes. The loop trail begins and ends near the Pleasant Valley Boat Launch. The trail passes through a large wetland area, a stand of White Pine, a small pond and along the edge of Lake Arthur. It is located on South Shore.
- Pleasant Valley Trail is an "easy" hiking trail, 2.6 miles (4.2 km) long. It is marked with yellow blazes. Pleasant Valley Trail passes over hills and through valleys on the South Shore of Lake Arthur.
- Wyggeston Trail is a "moderate" to "difficult" hiking trail, 4.5 miles (7.2 km) long. It is marked with orange blazes. The trail begins just west of Pennsylvania Route 528 on Christley Road and ends at Old Route 422. The trail is rough and rocky and passes through an undeveloped part of the park that includes historic remnants of an old house foundation, stone fences, and a historic oil pump house.
- Glacier Ridge Trail is a "difficult" hiking trail, 14 miles (23 km) long. It is part of the North Country Trail and is marked with blue blazes. Glacier Ridge Trail connects Moraine State Park with the Jennings Environmental Education Center via the North Shore.
- Five Points Trail is an "easy" hiking trail, 1.5 miles (2.4 km) long. It is marked with light green blazes and is near Lakeview Beach and the cabins on the North Shore.

=== Cemeteries ===
Being a man-made lake, several properties were purchased by the government for the creation of the lake. Some of these properties contained burial plots. The most famous of these plots is Snyder Cemetery. The cemetery is known for its frequent hauntings that have been perceived by many different people. Other cemeteries in the area include: Davis Cemetery, Shaffer Cemetery, McCandless Cemetery, Robertson Cemetery, Horse Cemetery and many others.

=== Staying overnight ===
Guests interested in staying overnight at Moraine State Park have three options. A limited number of guests may use a shelter on the North Country Trail that is available on a reservation basis. Organized large groups, such as Boy Scouts can use one of two large group tenting area. Both areas lack showers, but they do have picnic tables, cooking grills and fresh water. There are eleven modern cabins available to rent at Moraine State Park. They are heated with electricity and sleep up to six people in two bedrooms. The cabins also have modern bathrooms, kitchens, a dining/living area and a dock on Lake Arthur. Renters need to bring their own bed linens, towels, cookware and tableware.

=== Winter recreation ===
Moraine State Park is open year-round, and it stays busy with visitors during the winter months. Pleasant Valley and Sunken Garden Trails are part of a larger network of trails open for cross-country skiing. There are approximately 20 miles (32 km) of trails open to snowmobiling. Sledding is a very popular activity on the south shore near the Pleasant View Picnic Area. A section of Lake Arthur, near the Pleasant Valley Day Use Area is maintained for ice skating.
