= Muddy Creek Township, Pennsylvania =

Township in Pennsylvania, US

Coordinates: 40°54′34″N 80°06′09″W

- Township
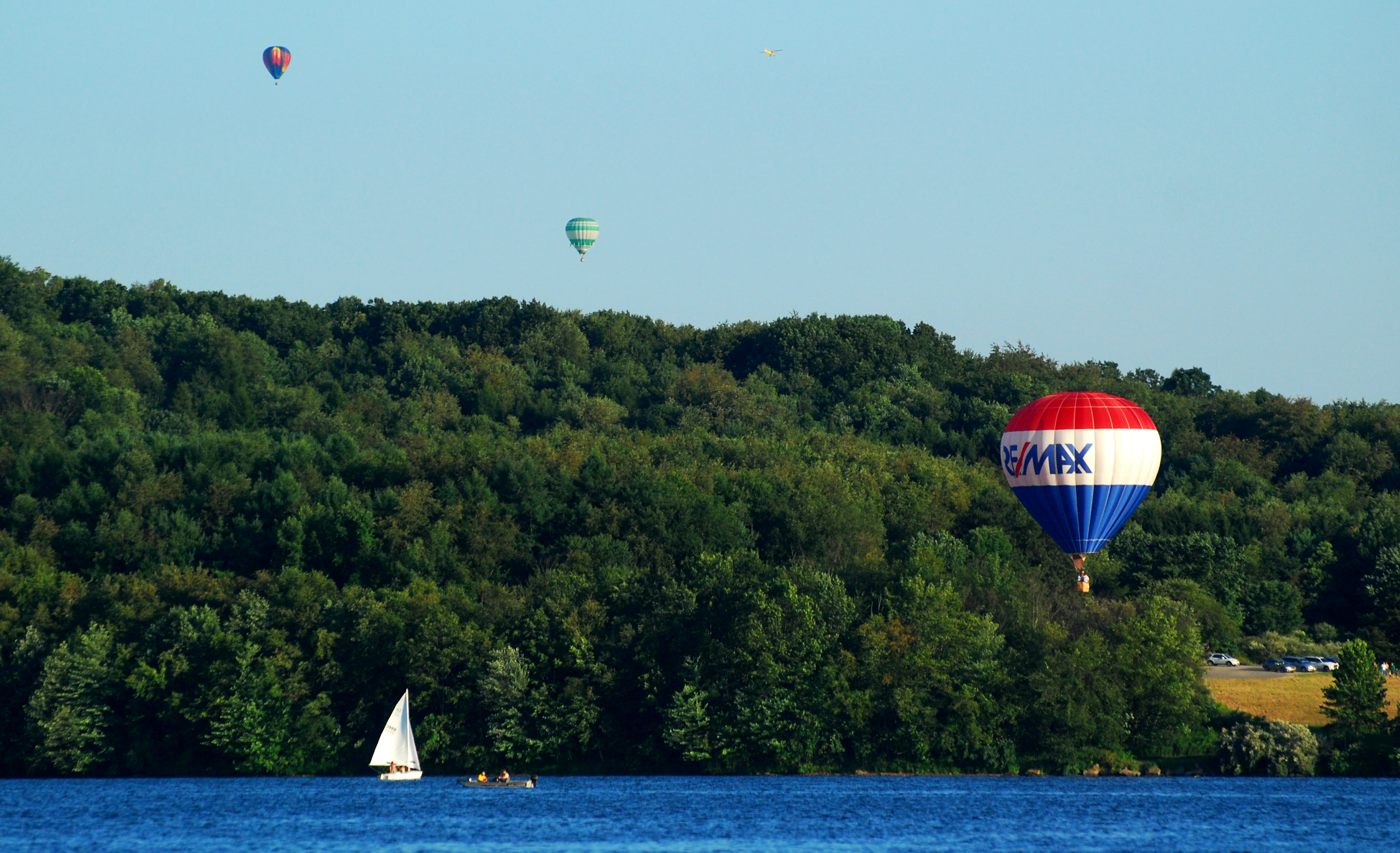
- Lake Arthur, Moraine State Park

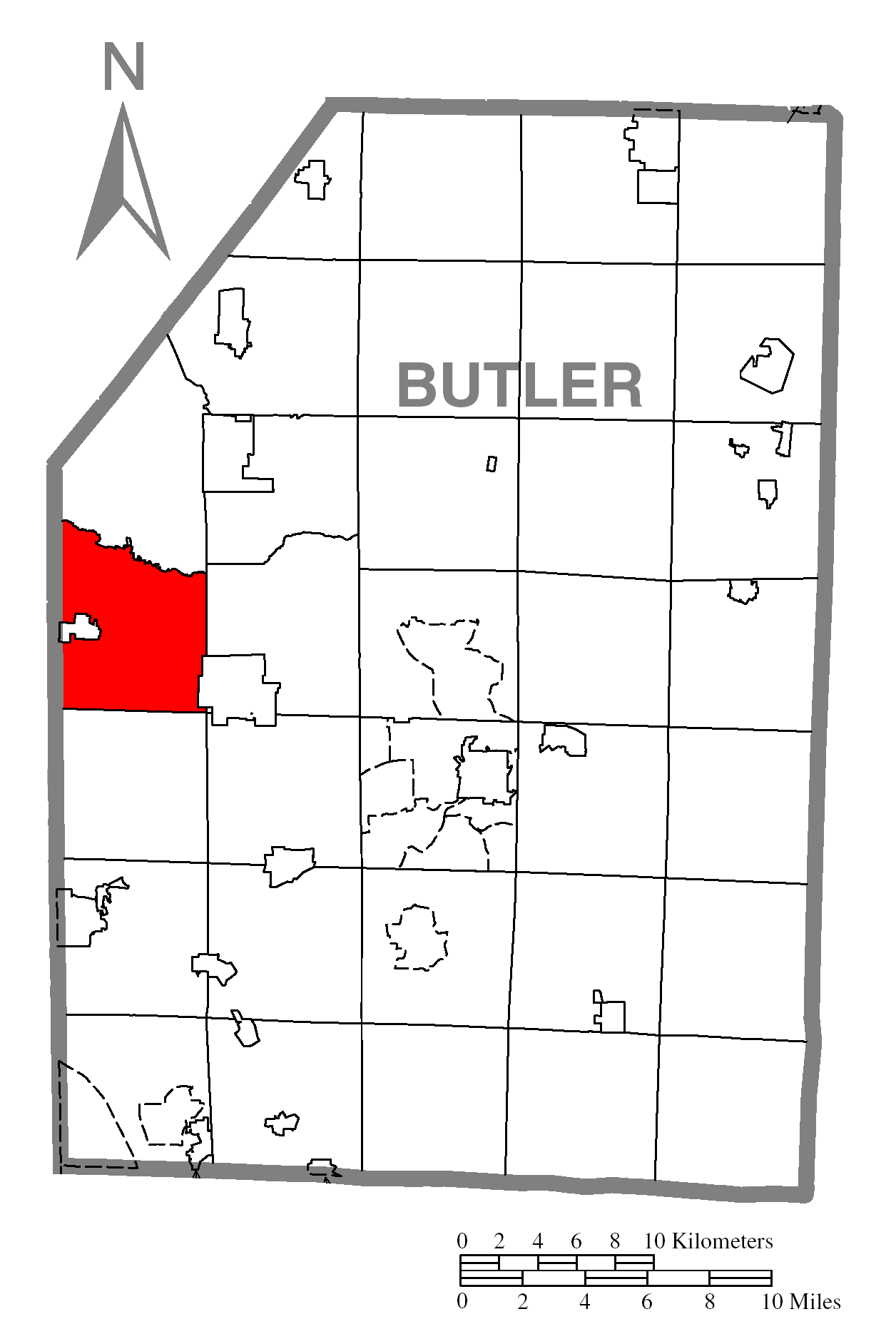
- Map of Butler County, Pennsylvania, highlighting Muddy Creek Township

- Map of Butler County, Pennsylvania
- Country: United States
- State: Pennsylvania
- County: Butler
- Settled: 1794
- Incorporated: 1804

Area
  - Total: 24.39 sq mi (63.18 km^{2})
  - Land: 22.42 sq mi (58.07 km^{2})
  - Water: 1.97 sq mi (5.10 km^{2})

Population (2020)
  - Total: 2,210 ▼
  - Estimate (2022): 2,184
  - Density: 97/sq mi (37.3/km^{2})
- Time zone: UTC-5 (Eastern (EST))
  - Summer (DST): UTC-4 (EDT)
- FIPS code: 42-019-52176
- Website: www.muddycreektwp.com

Muddy Creek Township is a township in Butler County, Pennsylvania, United States. The population was 2,210 at the 2020 census.

== Geography ==
Muddy Creek Township is located along the western border of Butler County, with Lawrence County to the west. Muddy Creek, a tributary of Slippery Rock Creek, forms the northern boundary of the township. The creek is impounded in the township to form Lake Arthur, surrounded by Moraine State Park.

The township surrounds the borough of Portersville but is a separate entity. The unincorporated community of Lake Arthur Estates, a census-designated place, is in the northwestern part of the township.

Interstate 79 passes through the township north to south with access from Exit 96 (Portersville) and Exit 99 (U.S. Route 422, the Benjamin Franklin Highway). U.S. Route 19 also crosses the township, roughly parallel to I-79.

According to the United States Census Bureau, the township has a total area of 24.4 square miles (63.2 km^{2}), of which 22.4 square miles (58.1 km^{2}) is land and 2.0 square miles (5.1 km^{2}), or 8.08%, is water.

== Demographics ==
Historical population
Census	Pop.	Note	%±
2010	2,254		—
2020	2,210		−2.0%
2022 (est.)	2,184		−1.2%
U.S. Decennial Census

As of the 2000 census, there were 2,267 people, 901 households, and 658 families residing in the township. The population density was 103.9 inhabitants per square mile (40.1/km^{2}). There were 941 housing units at an average density of 43.1 per square mile (16.6/km^{2}). The racial makeup of the township was 98.50% White, 0.18% African American, 0.35% Native American, 0.31% Asian, 0.04% Pacific Islander, 0.09% from other races, and 0.53% from two or more races. Hispanic or Latino of any race were 0.44% of the population.

There were 901 households, out of which 32.7% had children under the age of 18 living with them, 60.3% were married couples living together, 9.0% had a female householder with no husband present, and 26.9% were non-families. 22.9% of all households were made up of individuals, and 8.8% had someone living alone who was 65 years of age or older. The average household size was 2.52 and the average family size was 2.96.

In the township the population was spread out, with 24.4% under the age of 18, 8.6% from 18 to 24, 28.5% from 25 to 44, 25.1% from 45 to 64, and 13.2% who were 65 years of age or older. The median age was 38 years. For every 100 females, there were 100.4 males. For every 100 females age 18 and over, there were 98.7 males.

The median income for a household in the township was $31,855, and the median income for a family was $37,180. Males had a median income of $35,161 versus $22,992 for females. The per capita income for the township was $15,821. About 11.4% of families and 13.9% of the population were below the poverty line, including 24.9% of those under age 18 and 8.5% of those age 65 or over.
