= Worth Township, Butler County, Pennsylvania =

Township in Pennsylvania, US

Coordinates: 40°59′00″N 80°07′59″W

- Township
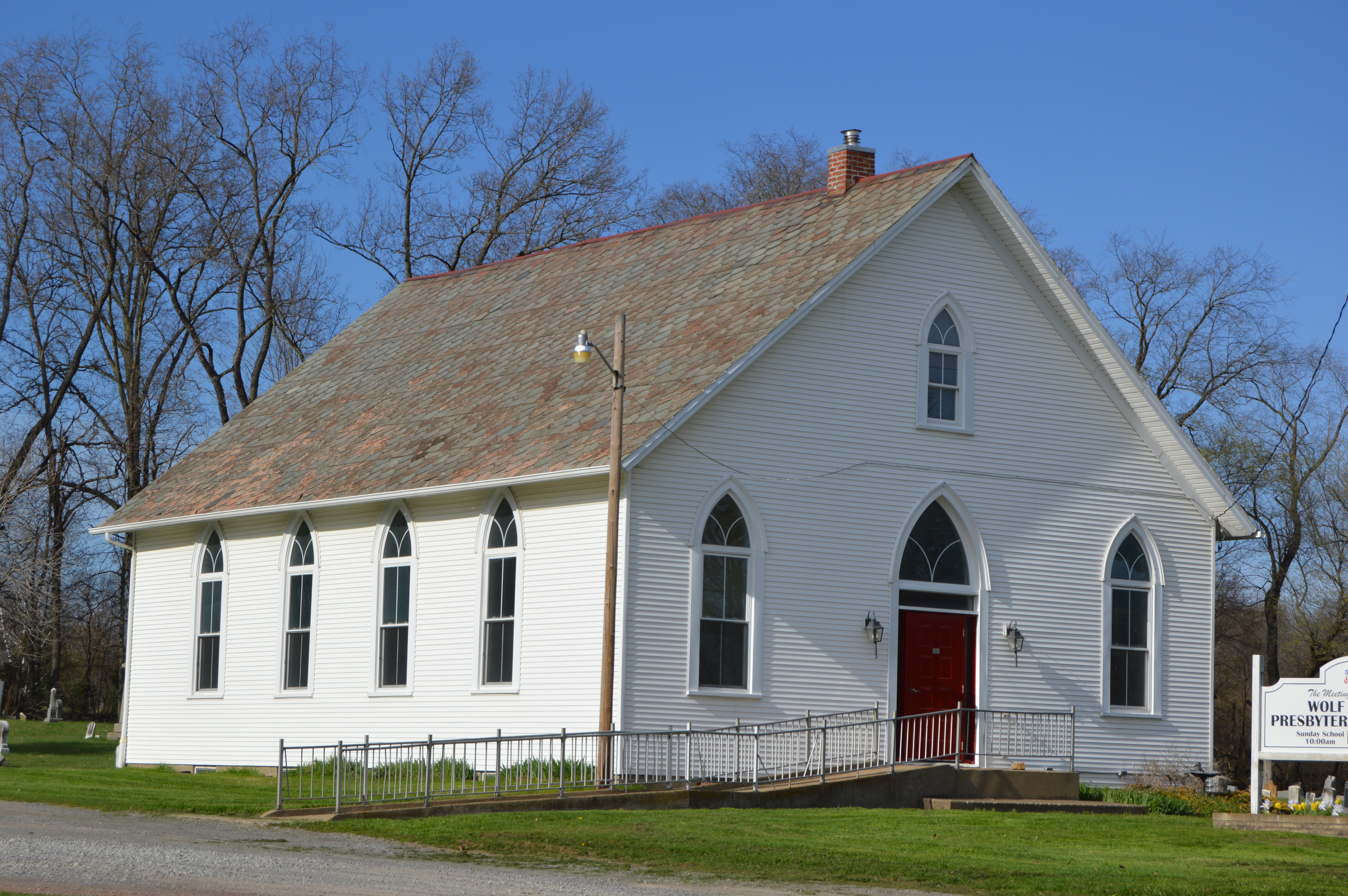
- Wolf Creek Presbyterian Church

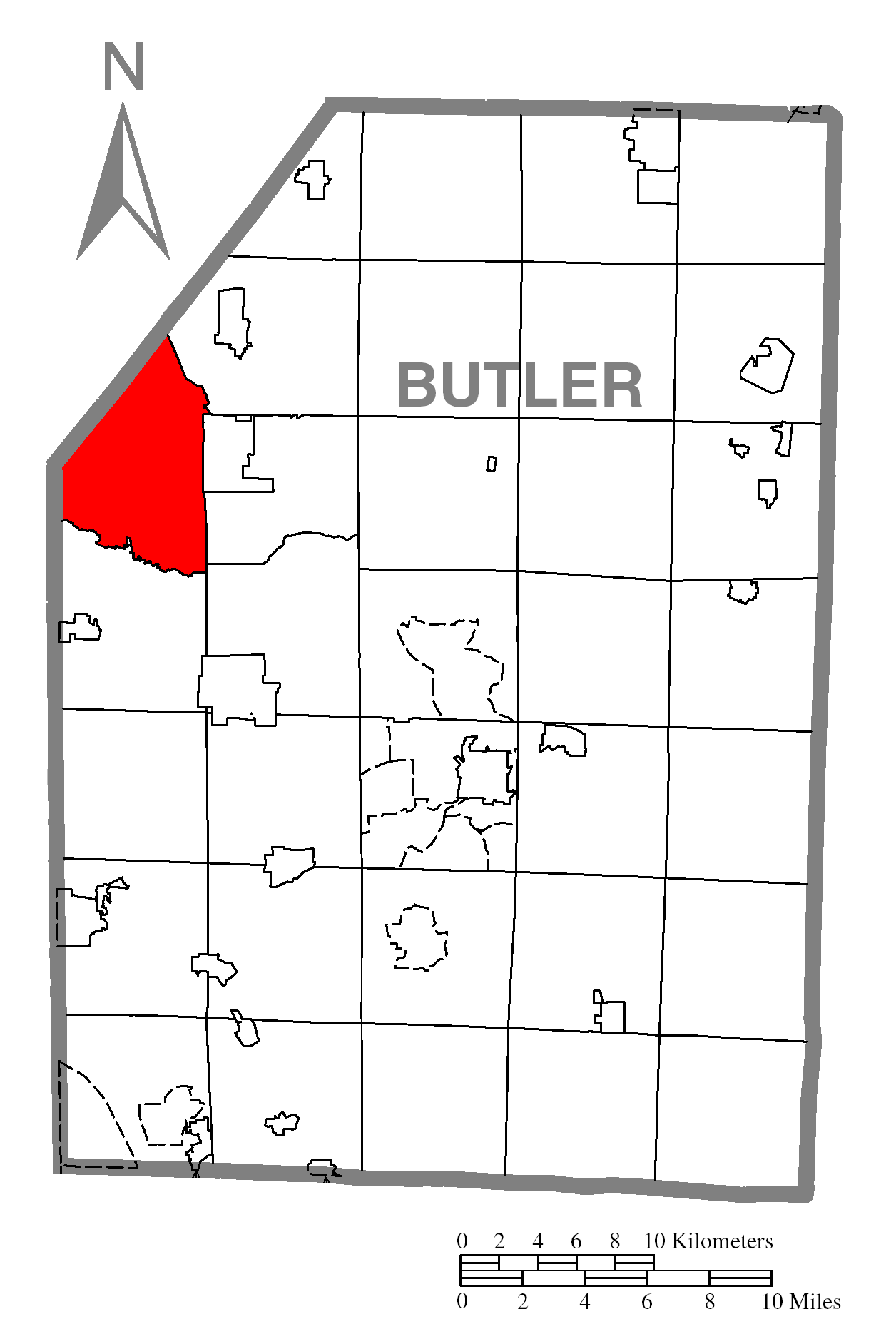
- Map of Butler County, Pennsylvania, highlighting Worth Township

- Map of Butler County, Pennsylvania
- Country: United States
- State: Pennsylvania
- County: Butler
- Settled: 1790
- Incorporated: 1854

Area
  - Total: 25.21 sq mi (65.29 km^{2})
  - Land: 24.23 sq mi (62.75 km^{2})
  - Water: 0.98 sq mi (2.54 km^{2})

Population (2020)
  - Total: 1,398 ▼
  - Estimate (2022): 1,372
  - Density: 59.7/sq mi (23.06/km^{2})
- Time zone: UTC-5 (Eastern (EST))
  - Summer (DST): UTC-4 (EDT)
- FIPS code: 42-019-86536
- Website: www.worthtwp.org

Worth Township is a township that is located in Butler County, Pennsylvania, United States. The population was 1,398 at the time of the 2020 census.

== Geography ==
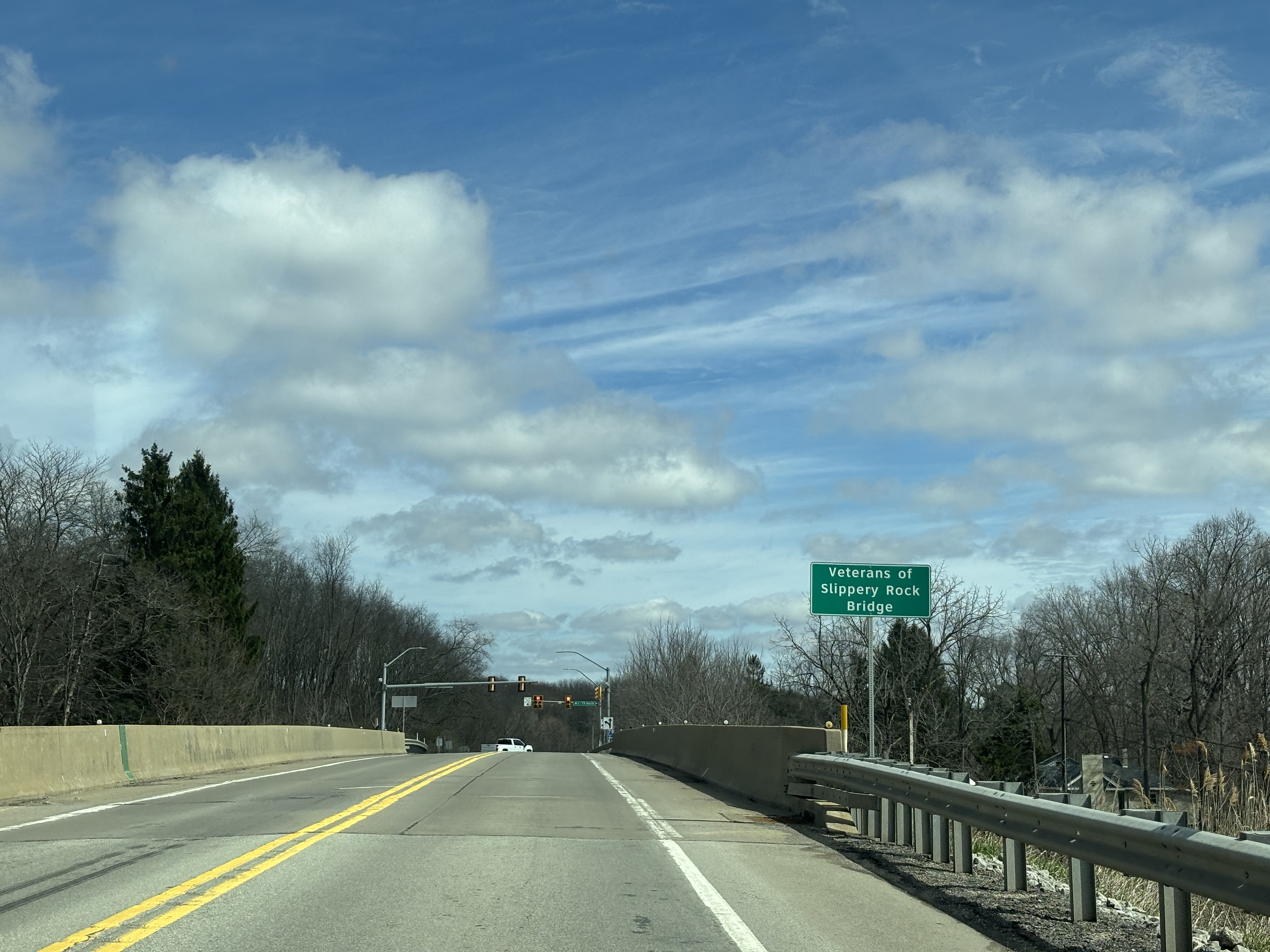
PA 108 crossing over I-79 in Worth Township, near Slippery Rock

Worth Township is located in northwestern Butler County, along the county's border with Lawrence County. It includes the unincorporated communities of Jacksville and Moores Corners.

Interstate 79 runs north–south through the township, with access from Exit 105 (Pennsylvania Route 108) in the north and Exit 99 (U.S. Route 422) just south of the township border.

Slippery Rock Creek flows through the northern corner of the township, and Muddy Creek forms the township's southern boundary. The creek is impounded to form Lake Arthur, which is surrounded by Moraine State Park, a recreational area.

According to the United States Census Bureau, the township has a total area of 25.2 square miles (65.3 km^{2}), of which 24.2 square miles (62.8 km^{2}) is land and 0.97 square miles (2.5 km^{2}), or 3.89%, is water.

== Demographics ==
Historical population
Census	Pop.	Note	%±
2010	1,416		—
2020	1,398		−1.3%
2022 (est.)	1,372		−1.9%
U.S. Decennial Census

As of the 2000 census, there were 1,331 people, 473 households, and 377 families residing in the township.

The population density was 54.9 inhabitants per square mile (21.2/km^{2}). There were 543 housing units at an average density of 22.4/sq mi (8.6/km^{2}).

The racial makeup of the township was 98.27% White, 0.53% Asian, 0.38% from other races, and 0.83% from two or more races. Hispanic or Latino of any race were 0.53% of the population.

There were 473 households, out of which 38.3% had children under the age of eighteen living with them; 70.4% were married couples living together, 7.0% had a female householder with no husband present, and 20.1% were non-families. 16.5% of all households were made up of individuals, and 5.9% had someone living alone who was sixty-five years of age or older.

The average household size was 2.79 and the average family size was 3.16.

Within the township, the population was spread out, with 26.6% of residents who were under the age of eighteen, 7.0% who were aged eighteen to twenty-four, 31.3% who were aged twenty-five to forty-four, 24.7% who were aged forty-five to sixty-four, and 10.4% who were sixty-five years of age or older. The median age was thirty-eight years.

For every one hundred females there were 94.6 males. For every one hundred females who were aged eighteen or older, there were 99.0 males.

The median income for a household in the township was $40,724, and the median income for a family was $47,891. Males had a median income of $35,417 compared with that of $23,864 for females.

The per capita income for the township was $17,324.

Approximately 6.0% of families and 9.7% of the population were living below the poverty line, including 12.5% of those who were under the age of eighteen and 8.8% of those who were aged sixty-five or older.

== Culture ==
Coopers Lake Campground in the township is the site of the annual Pennsic War, a medieval camping event.
