= Seaton Creek (Slippery Rock Creek tributary) =

River in Pennsylvania

Seaton Creek Tributary to Slippery Rock Creek
- Location of Seaton Creek mouth Seaton Creek (Slippery Rock Creek tributary) (the United States)

Location
- Country: United States of America
- State: Pennsylvania
- County: Butler
- Townships: Marion; Venango

Physical characteristics
- Source: divide between Seaton Creek and Little Scrubgrass Creek
  - location: about 0.5 miles west of Eau Claire, Pennsylvania
  - coordinates: 41°08′05″N 79°48′40″W
  - elevation: 1,480 ft (450 m)
- Mouth: Slippery Rock Creek
  - location: Boyers, Pennsylvania
  - coordinates: 41°06′43″N 79°53′26″W
  - elevation: 1,195 ft (364 m)
- Length: 4.88 mi (7.85 km)
- Basin size: 10.42 square miles (27.0 km^{2})
- Discharge
  - average: 16.16 cu ft/s (0.458 m^{3}/s) at mouth with Slippery Rock Creek

Basin features
- Progression: Slippery Rock Creek → Connoquenessing Creek → Beaver River → Ohio River → Mississippi River → Gulf of Mexico
- River system: Beaver River
- Tributaries
  - left: unnamed tributaries
  - right: unnamed tributaries
- Bridges: Smith Road, McJunkin Road, S Enco Road

Seaton Creek is a small tributary of Slippery Rock Creek in western Pennsylvania. The stream rises in northern Butler County and flows southwest entering Slippery Rock Creek near Boyers, Pennsylvania. The watershed is roughly 26% agricultural, 68% forested and the rest is other uses.

== See also ==
- List of rivers of Pennsylvania
