= Blacks Creek (Slippery Rock Creek tributary) =

River in Pennsylvania

Blacks Creek Tributary to Slippery Rock Creek
- Location of Blacks Creek mouth Blacks Creek (Slippery Rock Creek tributary) (the United States)

Location
- Country: United States of America
- State: Pennsylvania
- County: Butler; Venango
- Townships: Marion (Butler); Irwin (Venango)

Physical characteristics
- Source: divide between Blacks Creek and Scrubgrass Creek
  - location: about 2 miles south of Nectarine, Pennsylvania
  - coordinates: 41°10′33″N 79°55′17″W
  - elevation: 1,420 ft (430 m)
- Mouth: Slippery Rock Creek
  - location: about 0.25 miles west of Boyers, Pennsylvania
  - coordinates: 41°06′41″N 79°54′56″W
  - elevation: 1,190 ft (360 m)
- Length: 4.8 mi (7.7 km)
- Basin size: 8.75 square miles (22.7 km^{2})
- Discharge
  - average: 13.42 cu ft/s (0.380 m^{3}/s) at mouth with Slippery Rock Creek

Basin features
- Progression: Slippery Rock Creek → Connoquenessing Creek → Beaver River → Ohio River → Mississippi River → Gulf of Mexico
- River system: Beaver River
- Tributaries
  - left: unnamed tributaries
  - right: unnamed tributaries
- Bridges: County Line Road, Porter Road, Creek Bottom Road, Eau Claire Road

Blacks Creek is a small tributary of Slippery Rock Creek in western Pennsylvania. The stream rises in southeastern Venango County and flows south entering Slippery Rock Creek near Boyers, Pennsylvania. The watershed is roughly 31% agricultural, 62% forested and the rest is other uses.
