= South Branch Slippery Rock Creek =

River in Pennsylvania

South Branch Slippery Rock Creek Tributary to Slippery Rock Creek
- Location of South Branch Slippery Rock Creek mouth South Branch Slippery Rock Creek (the United States)

Location
- Country: United States of America
- State: Pennsylvania
- County: Butler
- Townships: Cherry; Concord; Washington

Physical characteristics
- Source: divide between South Branch Slippery Rock Creek and Allegheny River (Bear Creek)
  - location: about 0.5 miles east of Hooker, Pennsylvania
  - coordinates: 40°59′58″N 79°48′58″W
  - elevation: 1,320 ft (400 m)
- Mouth: Slippery Rock Creek
  - location: about 1 mile south of Bovard, Pennsylvania
  - coordinates: 41°03′33″N 79°58′47″W
  - elevation: 1,165 ft (355 m)
- Length: 13.89 mi (22.35 km)
- Basin size: 39.49 square miles (102.3 km^{2})
- Discharge
  - average: 55.78 cu ft/s (1.580 m^{3}/s) at mouth with Slippery Rock Creek

Basin features
- Progression: Slippery Rock Creek → Connoquenessing Creek → Beaver River → Ohio River → Mississippi River → Gulf of Mexico
- River system: Beaver River
- Tributaries
  - left: Findlay Run
  - right: Christy Run
- Waterbodies: Glade Dam Lake
- Bridges: Kuhn Road, Oneida Valley Road, Manuel Road, N Washington Road, Calico Road, W Sunbury Road, Grubb Road, Chambers Road, Coaltown Road, Saniga Road

South Branch Slippery Rock Creek is a main tributary of Slippery Rock Creek in western Pennsylvania. The stream rises in northwestern Butler County and flows northwest entering Slippery Rock Creek near Bovard, Pennsylvania. The watershed is roughly 25% agricultural, 67% forested and the rest is other uses.

== See also ==
- List of rivers of Pennsylvania
