= Jamison Run (Slippery Rock Creek tributary) =

River in Pennsylvania

Jamison Run Tributary to Slippery Rock Creek
- Location of Jamison Run mouth

Location
- Country: United States of America
- State: Pennsylvania
- County: Lawrence
- Townships: Plain Grove

Physical characteristics
- Source: divide between Jamison Creek and Wolf Creek
  - location: about 1 mile SE of Brent, Pennsylvania
  - coordinates: 41°06′34″N 80°09′28″W
  - elevation: 1,250 ft (380 m)
- Mouth: Slippery Rock Creek
  - location: Elliotts Mills, Pennsylvania
  - coordinates: 41°01′58″N 80°08′26″W
  - elevation: 1,085 ft (331 m)
- Length: 7.39 mi (11.89 km)
- Basin size: 12.76 square miles (33.0 km^{2})
- Discharge
  - average: 18.01 cu ft/s (0.510 m^{3}/s) at mouth with Slippery Rock Creek

Basin features
- Progression: Slippery Rock Creek → Connoquenessing Creek → Beaver River → Ohio River → Mississippi River → Gulf of Mexico
- River system: Beaver River
- Tributaries
  - left: unnamed tributaries
  - right: unnamed tributaries
- Bridges: Hilmar Road, Hilmer Road Ext., McNulty Road, I-79 (x2), Plain Grove-North Liberty Road, Pollock Store Road, Rodgers Road, Burris Road, Harlansburg Road (PA 108)

Jamison Run is a small tributary of Slippery Rock Creek in western Pennsylvania. The stream rises in northern Lawrence County and flows south entering Slippery Rock Creek at Elliotts Mills, Pennsylvania. The watershed is roughly 46% agricultural, 45% forested and the rest is other uses.
