= McMurray Run =

River in Pennsylvania

McMurray Run Tributary to Slippery Rock Creek
- Location of McMurray Run mouth McMurray Run (the United States)

Location
- Country: United States of America
- State: Pennsylvania
- County: Butler
- Townships: Slippery Rock; Mercer
- Borough: Harrisville

Physical characteristics
- Source: divide between McMurray Run and Wolf Creek
  - location: about 1 mile north of Harrisville, Pennsylvania
  - coordinates: 41°09′32″N 80°00′23″W
  - elevation: 1,390 ft (420 m)
- Mouth: Slippery Rock Creek
  - location: Rock Hill Camp
  - coordinates: 41°04′38″N 79°57′55″W
  - elevation: 1,175 ft (358 m)
- Length: 7.64 mi (12.30 km)
- Basin size: 13.29 square miles (34.4 km^{2})
- Discharge
  - average: 19.6 cu ft/s (0.56 m^{3}/s) at mouth with Slippery Rock Creek

Basin features
- Progression: Slippery Rock Creek → Connoquenessing Creek → Beaver River → Ohio River → Mississippi River → Gulf of Mexico
- River system: Beaver River
- Tributaries
  - left: unnamed tributaries
  - right: unnamed tributaries
- Bridges: William Flynn Highway (PA 8), E Mercer Street, Frampton Road, Boyers Road, New Hope Road

McMurray Run is a small tributary of Slippery Rock Creek in western Pennsylvania. The stream rises in northwestern Butler County and flows south entering Slippery Rock Creek at Rock Hill Camp. The watershed is roughly 39% agricultural, 53% forested and the rest is other uses.

== See also ==
- List of rivers of Pennsylvania
