= Big Run (Slippery Rock Creek tributary) =

River in Pennsylvania

Big Run Tributary to Slippery Rock Creek
- Location of Big Run mouth Big Run (Slippery Rock Creek tributary) (the United States)

Location
- Country: United States of America
- State: Pennsylvania
- County: Butler
- Township: Brady

Physical characteristics
- Source: divide between Big Run and Muddy Creek
  - location: about 0.25 miles south of Elora, Pennsylvania
  - coordinates: 40°59′14″N 79°59′20″W
  - elevation: 1,370 ft (420 m)
- Mouth: Slippery Rock Creek
  - location: about 0.25 miles east of Crolls Mills, Pennsylvania
  - coordinates: 41°01′14″N 80°02′07″W
  - elevation: 1,130 ft (340 m)
- Length: 4.52 mi (7.27 km)
- Basin size: 7.14 square miles (18.5 km^{2})
- Discharge
  - average: 10.36 cu ft/s (0.293 m^{3}/s) at mouth with Slippery Rock Creek

Basin features
- Progression: Slippery Rock Creek → Connoquenessing Creek → Beaver River → Ohio River → Mississippi River → Gulf of Mexico
- River system: Beaver River
- Tributaries
  - left: unnamed tributaries
  - right: unnamed tributaries
- Bridges: William Flynn Highway (PA 8) (x2), Duffy Road, McBride Road

Big Run is a small tributary of Slippery Rock Creek in western Pennsylvania. The stream rises in northwestern Butler County and flows northwest entering Slippery Rock Creek just east of Crolls Mills, Pennsylvania. The watershed is roughly 26% agricultural, 65% forested and the rest is other uses.

== See also ==
- List of rivers of Pennsylvania
