= Glade Run (Slippery Rock Creek tributary) =

River in Pennsylvania

Glade Run Tributary to Slippery Rock Creek
- Location of Glade Run mouth Glade Run (Slippery Rock Creek tributary) (the United States)

Location
- Country: United States of America
- State: Pennsylvania
- County: Butler
- Township: Brady

Physical characteristics
- Source: divide between Glade Run and Muddy Creek
  - location: about 0.5 southwest of Euclid, Pennsylvania
  - coordinates: 40°59′04″N 79°56′42″W
  - elevation: 1,370 ft (420 m)
- Mouth: Slippery Rock Creek
  - location: Slippery Rock Park, Pennsylvania
  - coordinates: 41°01′30″N 80°00′50″W
  - elevation: 1,148 ft (350 m)
- Length: 5.42 mi (8.72 km)
- Basin size: 7.62 square miles (19.7 km^{2})
- Discharge
  - average: 11.12 cu ft/s (0.315 m^{3}/s) at mouth with Slippery Rock Creek

Basin features
- Progression: Slippery Rock Creek → Connoquenessing Creek → Beaver River → Ohio River → Mississippi River → Gulf of Mexico
- River system: Beaver River
- Tributaries
  - left: unnamed tributaries
  - right: unnamed tributaries
- Bridges: Delu Road, Claytonia Road, Halston Road, Carara Road, William Flynn Highway (PA 8)

Glade Run is a small tributary of Slippery Rock Creek in western Pennsylvania. The stream rises in northwestern Butler County and flows northwest entering Slippery Rock Creek at Slippery Rock Park, Pennsylvania. The watershed is roughly 42% agricultural, 51% forested and the rest is other uses.

== See also ==
- List of rivers of Pennsylvania
