= North Branch Slippery Rock Creek =

River in Pennsylvania

North Branch Slippery Rock Creek Tributary to Slippery Rock Creek
- Location of North Branch Slippery Rock Creek mouth North Branch Slippery Rock Creek (the United States)

Location
- Country: United States of America
- State: Pennsylvania
- County: Butler; Venango
- Townships: Marion (Butler); Irwin (Venango)

Physical characteristics
- Source: divide between North Branch Slippery Rock Creek and East Branch of Wolf Creek
  - location: Barkeyville, Pennsylvania
  - coordinates: 41°11′53″N 79°58′57″W
  - elevation: 1,370 ft (420 m)
- Mouth: Slippery Rock Creek
  - location: about 0.5 miles southwest of Atwells Crossing, Pennsylvania
  - coordinates: 41°05′53″N 79°55′49″W
  - elevation: 1,180 ft (360 m)
- Length: 8.97 mi (14.44 km)
- Basin size: 16.17 square miles (41.9 km^{2})
- Discharge
  - average: 24.28 cu ft/s (0.688 m^{3}/s) at mouth with Slippery Rock Creek

Basin features
- Progression: Slippery Rock Creek → Connoquenessing Creek → Beaver River → Ohio River → Mississippi River → Gulf of Mexico
- River system: Beaver River
- Tributaries
  - left: unnamed tributaries
  - right: unnamed tributaries
- Bridges: Stevenson Road, Barkeyville Road, Pittsburgh Road (PA 8), White Oak Road, Smith Road, Campground Road, Eau Claire Road, Watson Road, Boyers Road, Damatteis Road

North Branch Slippery Rock Creek is a main tributary of Slippery Rock Creek in western Pennsylvania. The stream rises in southeastern Venango County and flows south-southwest entering Slippery Rock Creek near Atwells Crossing. The watershed is roughly 33% agricultural, 59% forested and the rest is other uses.

== See also ==
- List of rivers of Pennsylvania
