= McDonald Run (Slippery Rock Creek tributary) =

Stream in Pennsylvania, USA

McDonald Run Tributary to Slippery Rock Creek
- Location of McDonald Run mouth McDonald Run (Slippery Rock Creek tributary) (the United States)

Location
- Country: United States
- State: Pennsylvania
- County: Butler

Physical characteristics
- Source: divide between McDonald Run and McMurray Run
  - location: Forestville, Pennsylvania
  - coordinates: 41°06′29″N 080°00′40″W
  - elevation: 1,330 ft (410 m)
- Mouth: Slippery Rock Creek
  - location: about 1 mile south of Branchton, Pennsylvania
  - coordinates: 41°03′39″N 079°59′16″W
  - elevation: 1,160 ft (350 m)
- Length: 3.07 mi (4.94 km)
- Basin size: 4.02 square miles (10.4 km^{2})
- Discharge
  - location: Slippery Rock Creek
  - average: 6.07 cu ft/s (0.172 m^{3}/s) at mouth with Slippery Rock Creek

Basin features
- Progression: Slippery Rock Creek → Connoquenessing Creek → Beaver River → Ohio River → Mississippi River → Gulf of Mexico
- River system: Beaver River
- Tributaries
  - left: unnamed tributaries
  - right: unnamed tributaries

McDonald Run is a 3.07 mi (4.94 km) long tributary to Slippery Rock Creek that rises near Forestville in Butler County, Pennsylvania and flows south to meet Slippery Rock Creek near Branchton.

== See also ==
- List of rivers of Pennsylvania
