= Venango Township, Butler County, Pennsylvania =

Township in Pennsylvania, US

Coordinates: 41°08′32″N 79°50′40″W

- Township
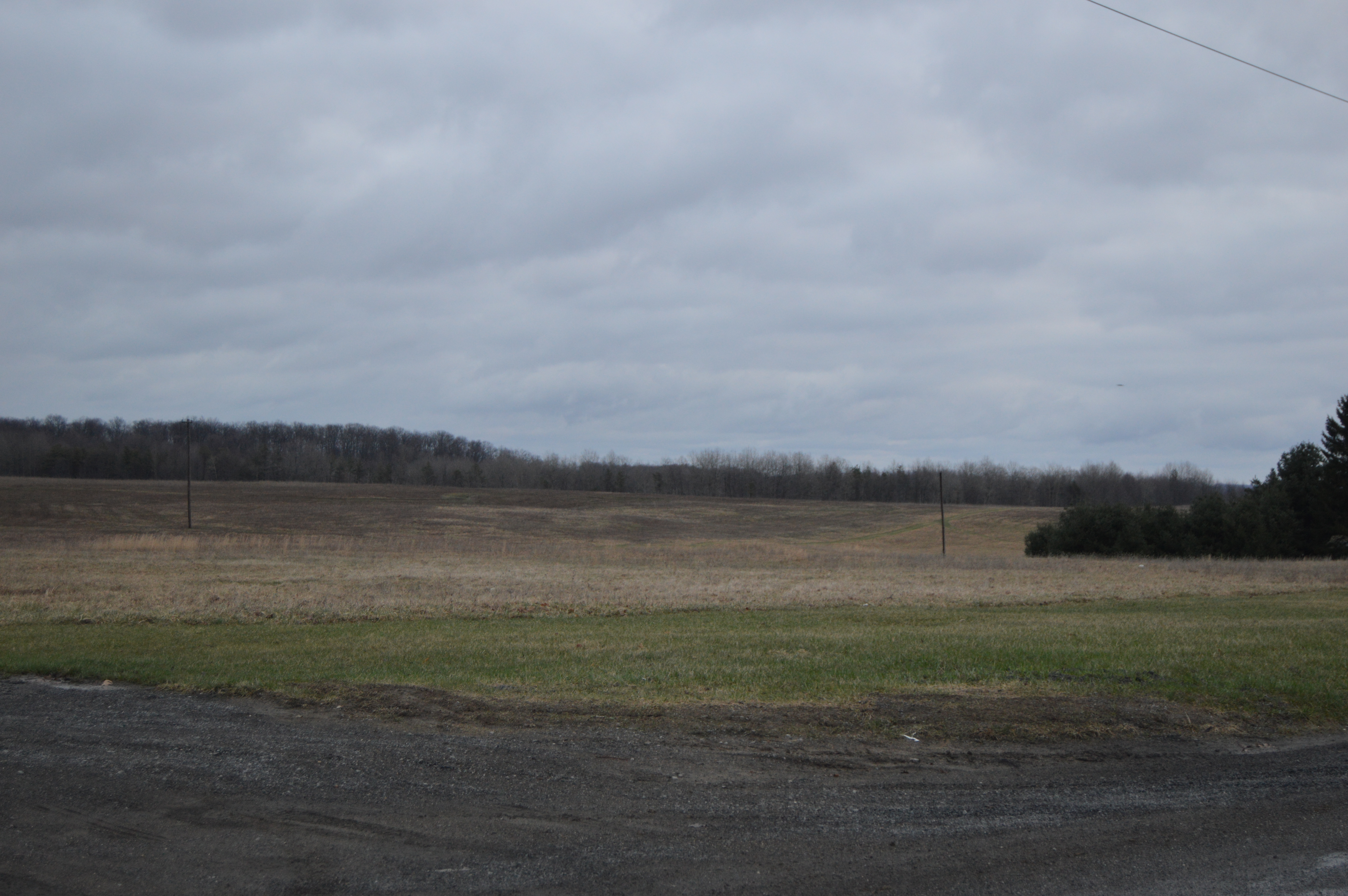
- Fields in the township's northwest

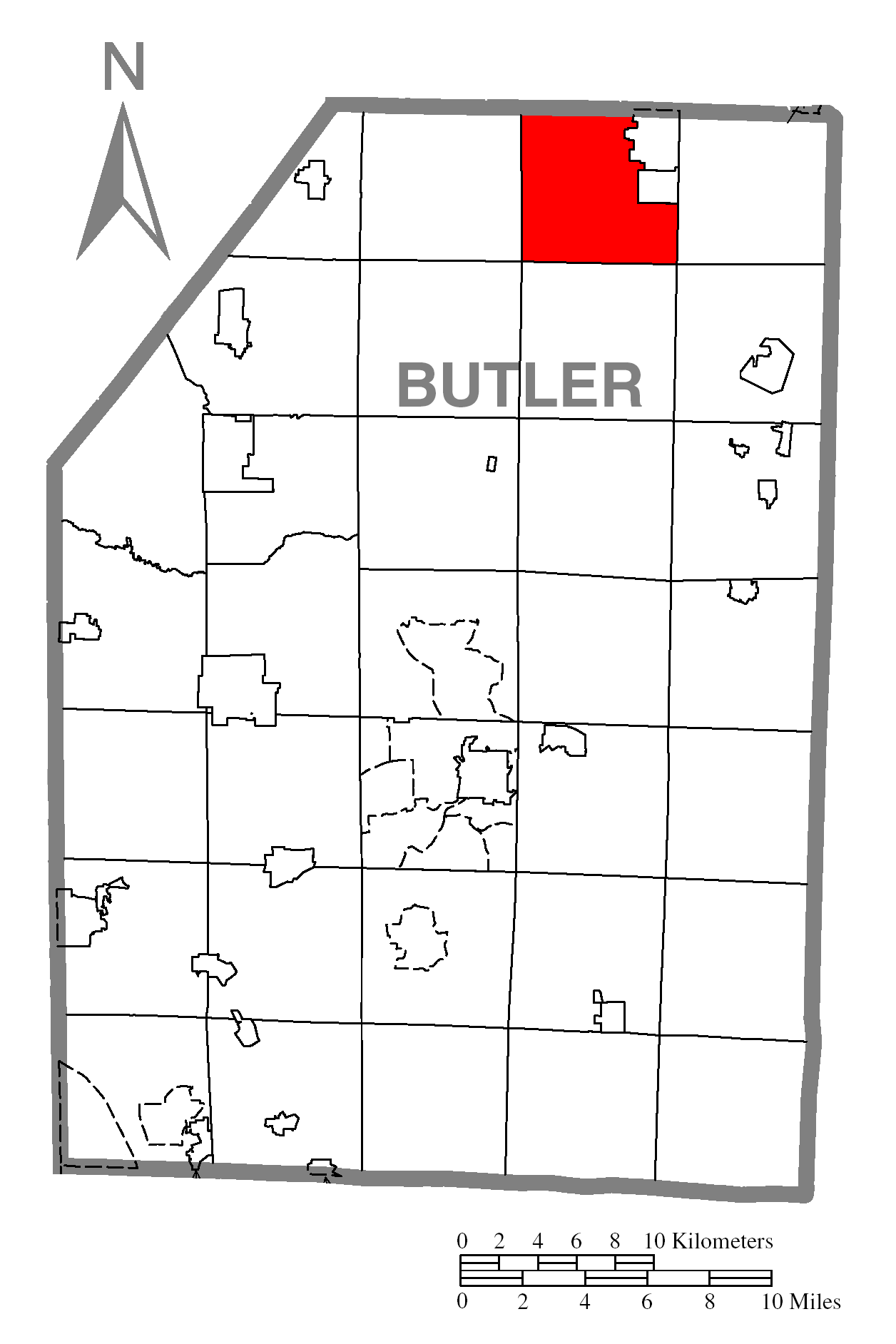
- Map of Butler County, Pennsylvania, highlighting Venango Township

- Map of Butler County, Pennsylvania
- Country: United States
- State: Pennsylvania
- County: Butler
- Settled: 1797
- Incorporated: 1804

Area
  - Total: 20.99 sq mi (54.36 km^{2})
  - Land: 20.99 sq mi (54.36 km^{2})
  - Water: 0 sq mi (0.00 km^{2})

Population (2020)
  - Total: 869 ▼
  - Estimate (2022): 847
  - Density: 40.2/sq mi (15.54/km^{2})
- Time zone: UTC-5 (Eastern (EST))
  - Summer (DST): UTC-4 (EDT)
- FIPS code: 42-019-79904

Venango Township is a township that is located in Butler County, Pennsylvania, United States. The population was 869 at the time of the 2020 census.

== Geography ==
Venango Township is located along the northern edge of Butler County. It is bordered by the borough of Cherry Valley to the east, the borough of Eau Claire to the east and north, Allegheny Township to the east, Parker Township at the southeastern corner, Washington Township to the south, Cherry Township at the southwestern corner, and Marion Township to the west.

Located to the north, in Venango County, are Clinton and Scrubgrass townships.

According to the United States Census Bureau, Venango Township has a total area of 21.0 square miles (54.4 km^{2}), all land.

== Demographics ==
Historical population
Census	Pop.	Note	%±
2010	868		—
2020	896		3.2%
2022 (est.)	847		−5.5%
U.S. Decennial Census

As of the 2000 census, there were 732 people, 277 households, and 216 families living in the township.

The population density was 35.3 inhabitants per square mile (13.6/km^{2}). There were 348 housing units at an average density of 16.8/sq mi (6.5/km^{2}).

The racial makeup of the township was 99.04% White, 0.14% Native American, 0.14% Pacific Islander, and 0.55% from two or more races. Hispanic or Latino of any race were 0.27% of the population.

There were 277 households, out of which 35.4% had children who were under the age of eighteen living with them, 65.7% were married couples living together, 5.4% had a female householder with no husband present, and 21.7% were non-families. 18.4% of all households were made up of individuals, and 6.9% had someone living alone who was sixty-five years of age or older.

The average household size was 2.60 and the average family size was 2.94.

Within the township, the population was spread out, with 25.7% of residents who were under the age of 18, 6.7% from 18 to 24, 29.2% from 25 to 44, 25.1% from 45 to 64, and 13.3% who were 65 years of age or older. The median age was 38 years.

For every 100 females there were 119.2 males. For every 100 females age 18 and over, there were 114.2 males.

The median income for a household in the township was $34,107, and the median income for a family was $38,214. Males had a median income of $30,938 compared with that of $20,694 for females.

The per capita income for the township was $14,600.

Approximately 10.0% of families and 11.6% of the population were living below the poverty line, including 9.9% of those who were under the age of eighteen and 15.7% of those who were aged sixty-five or older.
