= Taylor Run (Slippery Rock Creek tributary) =

River in Pennsylvania

Taylor Run Tributary to Slippery Rock Creek
- Location of Taylor Run mouth Taylor Run (Slippery Rock Creek tributary) (the United States)

Location
- Country: United States of America
- State: Pennsylvania
- County: Lawrence; Mercer
- Townships: Plain Grove; Scott; Springfield

Physical characteristics
- Source: divide between Slippery Rock Creek and Neshannock Creek
  - location: about 1 mile NE of Drake, Pennsylvania
  - coordinates: 41°07′15″N 80°10′24″W
  - elevation: 1,340 ft (410 m)
- Mouth: Slippery Rock Creek
  - location: about 1 mile NE of Harlansburg, Pennsylvania
  - coordinates: 41°01′44″N 80°09′28″W
  - elevation: 1,075 ft (328 m)
- Length: 8.35 mi (13.44 km)
- Basin size: 12.96 square miles (33.6 km^{2})
- Discharge
  - average: 17.9 cu ft/s (0.51 m^{3}/s) at mouth with Slippery Rock Creek

Basin features
- Progression: Slippery Rock Creek → Connoquenessing Creek → Beaver River → Ohio River → Mississippi River → Gulf of Mexico
- River system: Beaver River
- Tributaries
  - left: unnamed tributaries
  - right: unnamed tributaries
- Bridges: Old Ash Road (x2), McConahy Road, Georgetown Road, Reese Road, Elliott Mills Lane, Harlansburg Road (PA 108)

Taylor Run is a small tributary of Slippery Rock Creek in western Pennsylvania. The stream rises in southern Mercer County near Drake and flows south into Lawrence County entering Slippery Rock Creek upstream of Harlansburg, Pennsylvania. The watershed is roughly 60% agricultural, 30% forested and the rest is other uses.

== See also ==
- List of rivers of Pennsylvania
