= Long Run (Slippery Rock Creek tributary) =

River in Pennsylvania

Long Run Tributary to Slippery Rock Creek
- Location of Long Run mouth Long Run (Slippery Rock Creek tributary) (the United States)

Location
- Country: United States of America
- State: Pennsylvania
- County: Butler
- Township: Slippery Rock

Physical characteristics
- Source: divide between Long Run and Wolf Creek
  - location: about 0.5 northwest of Adams Corners, Pennsylvania
  - coordinates: 41°06′03″N 80°01′16″W
  - elevation: 1,350 ft (410 m)
- Mouth: Slippery Rock Creek
  - location: Camp Bucoco
  - coordinates: 41°02′59″N 80°00′15″W
  - elevation: 1,150 ft (350 m)
- Length: 3.93 mi (6.32 km)
- Basin size: 3.8 square miles (9.8 km^{2})
- Discharge
  - average: 5.77 cu ft/s (0.163 m^{3}/s) at mouth with Slippery Rock Creek

Basin features
- Progression: Slippery Rock Creek → Connoquenessing Creek → Beaver River → Ohio River → Mississippi River → Gulf of Mexico
- River system: Beaver River
- Tributaries
  - left: unnamed tributaries
  - right: unnamed tributaries
- Bridges: Franklin Road (PA 108), Branchton Road, Kiester Road

Long Run is a small tributary of Slippery Rock Creek in western Pennsylvania. The stream rises in northwestern Butler County and flows south, entering Slippery Rock Creek at Camp Bucoco, Pennsylvania. The watershed is roughly 49% agricultural, 44% forested and the rest is other uses.

== See also ==
- List of rivers of Pennsylvania
