= Cheeseman Run =

River in Pennsylvania

Cheeseman Run Tributary to Slippery Rock Creek
- Location of Cheeseman Run mouth Cheeseman Run (the United States)

Location
- Country: United States of America
- State: Pennsylvania
- County: Butler; Lawrence
- Townships: Perry; Muddy Creek

Physical characteristics
- Source: divide between Slippery Rock Creek and Muddy Creek
  - location: Portersville, Pennsylvania
  - coordinates: 40°55′32″N 80°08′52″W
  - elevation: 1,275 ft (389 m)
- Mouth: Slippery Rock Creek
  - location: about 0.25 miles downstream of Eckert Bridge on Slippery Rock Creek
  - coordinates: 40°56′19″N 80°10′43″W
  - elevation: 940 ft (290 m)
- Length: 2.14 mi (3.44 km)
- Basin size: 2.4 square miles (6.2 km^{2})
- Discharge
  - average: 3.2 cu ft/s (0.091 m^{3}/s) at mouth with Slippery Rock Creek

Basin features
- Progression: Slippery Rock Creek → Connoquenessing Creek → Beaver River → Ohio River → Mississippi River → Gulf of Mexico
- River system: Beaver River
- Tributaries
  - left: unnamed tributaries
  - right: unnamed tributaries
- Bridges: Breakneck Bridge Road (Breakneck Bridge)

Cheeseman Run is a small tributary of Slippery Rock Creek in western Pennsylvania. The stream rises in western Butler County near Portersville and flows northwest into Lawrence County entering Slippery Rock Creek in McConnells Mill State Park.

== See also ==
- List of rivers of Pennsylvania
