= Hogue Run =

River in Pennsylvania

Hogue Run Tributary to Slippery Rock Creek
- Location of Hogue Run mouth Hogue Run (the United States)

Location
- Country: United States of America
- State: Pennsylvania
- County: Butler
- Township: Worth
- Borough: West Liberty

Physical characteristics
- Source: divide between Hogue Run and Muddy Creek
  - location: about 2 miles NE of Shawood Park, Pennsylvania
  - coordinates: 40°59′04″N 80°05′51″W
  - elevation: 1,320 ft (400 m)
- Mouth: Slippery Rock Creek
  - location: Camp Crestview
  - coordinates: 41°01′44″N 80°04′20″W
  - elevation: 1,110 ft (340 m)
- Length: 6.58 mi (10.59 km)
- Basin size: 7.41 square miles (19.2 km^{2})
- Discharge
  - average: 10.7 cu ft/s (0.30 m^{3}/s) at mouth with Slippery Rock Creek

Basin features
- Progression: Slippery Rock Creek → Connoquenessing Creek → Beaver River → Ohio River → Mississippi River → Gulf of Mexico
- River system: Beaver River
- Tributaries
  - left: unnamed tributaries
  - right: unnamed tributaries
- Bridges: Reichert Road, Mt. Union Road, Rhoer Road, Alexander Road, Mayer Road, W Liberty Road, Church Road, Crolls Mill Road, Crestview Road, Barron Road

Hogue Run is a small tributary of Slippery Rock Creek in western Pennsylvania. The stream rises in northwestern Butler County and flows northeast then north entering Slippery Rock Creek at Camp Crestview. The watershed is roughly 34% agricultural, 61% forested and the rest is other uses.

== See also ==
- List of rivers of Pennsylvania
