= Skunk Run (Slippery Rock Creek tributary) =

River in Pennsylvania

Skunk Run Tributary to Slippery Rock Creek
- Location of Skunk Run mouth Skunk Run (Slippery Rock Creek tributary) (the United States)

Location
- Country: United States of America
- State: Pennsylvania
- County: Lawrence
- Townships: Shenango; Slippery Rock; Wayne

Physical characteristics
- Source: divide between Slippery Rock Creek and Connoquenessing Creek
  - location: Shenango and Slippery Rock township line at Castlewood, Pennsylvania
  - coordinates: 40°55′21″N 80°15′53″W
  - elevation: 1,260 ft (380 m)
- Mouth: Slippery Rock Creek
  - location: just downstream of Armstrong Bridge in McConnells Mill State Park
  - coordinates: 40°54′11″N 80°13′31″W
  - elevation: 940 ft (290 m)
- Length: 2.93 mi (4.72 km)
- Basin size: 1.86 square miles (4.8 km^{2})
- Discharge
  - average: 2.35 cu ft/s (0.067 m^{3}/s) at mouth with Slippery Rock Creek

Basin features
- Progression: Slippery Rock Creek → Connoquenessing Creek → Beaver River → Ohio River → Mississippi River → Gulf of Mexico
- River system: Beaver River
- Tributaries
  - left: unnamed tributaries
  - right: unnamed tributaries
- Bridges: Ellwood Road, Frew Road, Hogue Road

Skunk Run is a small tributary of Slippery Rock Creek in western Pennsylvania. The stream rises in eastern Lawrence County at the Shenango and Slippery Rock Township line and then flows southeast entering Slippery Rock Creek in McConnells Mill State Park. The watershed is nearly 50% forested.

== See also ==
- List of rivers of Pennsylvania
