= Black Run (Slippery Rock Creek tributary) =

River in Pennsylvania

Black Run Tributary to Slippery Rock Creek
- Location of Black Run mouth Black Run (Slippery Rock Creek tributary) (the United States)

Location
- Country: United States of America
- State: Pennsylvania
- County: Butler
- Township: Worth

Physical characteristics
- Source: wetland just above Tamarack Lake
  - location: about 2 miles south of Moores Corners, Pennsylvania
  - coordinates: 41°00′26″N 80°04′48″W
  - elevation: 1,195 ft (364 m)
- Mouth: Slippery Rock Creek
  - location: about 1 mile south of Elliotts Mills, Pennsylvania
  - coordinates: 41°01′29″N 80°07′55″W
  - elevation: 1,090 ft (330 m)
- Length: 3.64 mi (5.86 km)
- Basin size: 7.67 square miles (19.9 km^{2})
- Discharge
  - average: 10.83 cu ft/s (0.307 m^{3}/s) at mouth with Slippery Rock Creek

Basin features
- Progression: Slippery Rock Creek → Connoquenessing Creek → Beaver River → Ohio River → Mississippi River → Gulf of Mexico
- River system: Beaver River
- Tributaries
  - left: unnamed tributaries
  - right: unnamed tributaries
- Waterbodies: Tamarack Lake
- Bridges: Swope Road, W Park Road, I-79, Brandon Road

Black Run is a small tributary of Slippery Rock Creek in western Pennsylvania. The stream rises in northwestern Butler County and flows northwest entering Slippery Rock Creek south of Elliotts Mills, Pennsylvania. The watershed is roughly 48% agricultural, 45% forested and the rest is other uses.

== See also ==
- List of rivers of Pennsylvania
