= Camp Run (Connoquenessing Creek tributary) =

River in Pennsylvania

Camp Run Tributary to Connoquenessing Creek
- Location of Camp Run mouth Camp Run (Connoquenessing Creek tributary) (the United States)

Location
- Country: United States of America
- State: Pennsylvania
- Counties: Beaver; Butler; Lawrence

Physical characteristics
- Source: divide between Camp Run and Muddy Creek
  - location: Portersville, Pennsylvania
  - coordinates: 40°55′34″N 80°08′43″W
  - elevation: 1,320 ft (400 m)
- Mouth: Connoquenessing Creek
  - location: Fombell, Pennsylvania
  - coordinates: 40°48′29″N 80°12′04″W
  - elevation: 880 ft (270 m)
- Length: 9.87 mi (15.88 km)
- Basin size: 14.85 square miles (38.5 km^{2})
- Discharge
  - average: 17.61 cu ft/s (0.499 m^{3}/s) at mouth with Connoquenessing Creek

Basin features
- Progression: Connoquenessing Creek → Beaver River → Ohio River → Mississippi River → Gulf of Mexico
- River system: Beaver River
- Tributaries
  - left: unnamed tributaries
  - right: unnamed tributaries

Camp Run is a tributary of Connoquenessing Creek in western Pennsylvania. The stream rises in southeastern Lawrence County and flows south entering Connoquenessing Creek at Fombell, Pennsylvania. The watershed is roughly 39% agricultural, 55% forested and the rest is other uses.

== History ==
Camp Run is named for the "sugar camps" that historically lined the valley.
