= Scholars Run =

River in Pennsylvania

Scholars Run Tributary to Connoquenessing Creek
- Location of Scholars Run mouth Scholars Run (the United States)

Location
- Country: United States of America
- State: Pennsylvania
- County: Butler
- Townships: Jackson; Lancaster

Physical characteristics
- Source: divide between Camp Run and Little Yellow Creek
  - location: about 3 miles north of Middle Lancaster, Pennsylvania
  - coordinates: 40°52′32″N 80°08′40″W
  - elevation: 1,300 ft (400 m)
- Mouth: Connoquenessing Creek
  - location: Harmony, Pennsylvania
  - coordinates: 40°47′57″N 80°08′05″W
  - elevation: 895 ft (273 m)
- Length: 6.2 mi (10.0 km)
- Basin size: 7.06 square miles (18.3 km^{2})
- Discharge
  - average: 8.54 cu ft/s (0.242 m^{3}/s) at mouth with Connoquenessing Creek

Basin features
- Progression: Connoquenessing Creek → Beaver River → Ohio River → Mississippi River → Gulf of Mexico
- River system: Beaver River
- Tributaries
  - left: unnamed tributaries
  - right: unnamed tributaries
- Waterbodies: Perry Lake

Scholars Run is a tributary of Connoquenessing Creek in western Pennsylvania. The stream rises in southwestern Butler County and flows south entering Connoquenessing Creek at Harmony, Pennsylvania. The watershed is roughly 36% agricultural, 53% forested and the rest is other uses.
