= Grindstone Run (Slippery Rock Creek tributary) =

River in Pennsylvania

Grindstone Run Tributary to Slippery Rock Creek
- Location of Grindstone Run mouth Grindstone Run (Slippery Rock Creek tributary) (the United States)

Location
- Country: United States of America
- State: Pennsylvania
- County: Lawrence
- Township: Perry

Physical characteristics
- Source: divide between Slippery Rock Creek and Camp Run
  - location: about 3 miles north of Pyles Mills, Pennsylvania in Perry Township
  - coordinates: 40°54′28″N 80°10′49″W
  - elevation: 1,260 ft (380 m)
- Mouth: Slippery Rock Creek
  - location: about 1 mile upstream on Slippery Rock Creek from Harris Bridge in McConnells Mill State Park
  - coordinates: 40°55′13″N 80°12′01″W
  - elevation: 920 ft (280 m)
- Length: 1.3 mi (2.1 km)
- Basin size: 1.0 square mile (2.6 km^{2})
- Discharge
  - average: 1.32 cu ft/s (0.037 m^{3}/s) at mouth with Slippery Rock Creek

Basin features
- Progression: Slippery Rock Creek → Connoquenessing Creek → Beaver River → Ohio River → Mississippi River → Gulf of Mexico
- River system: Beaver River
- Tributaries
  - left: unnamed tributaries
  - right: unnamed tributaries
- Bridges: Mountville Road

Grindstone Run is a small tributary of Slippery Rock Creek in western Pennsylvania. The stream rises in eastern Lawrence County flows northwest into Slippery Rock Creek in McConnells Mill State Park.

== See also ==
- List of rivers of Pennsylvania
