= Allegheny Township, Butler County, Pennsylvania =

Township in Pennsylvania, US

- Township
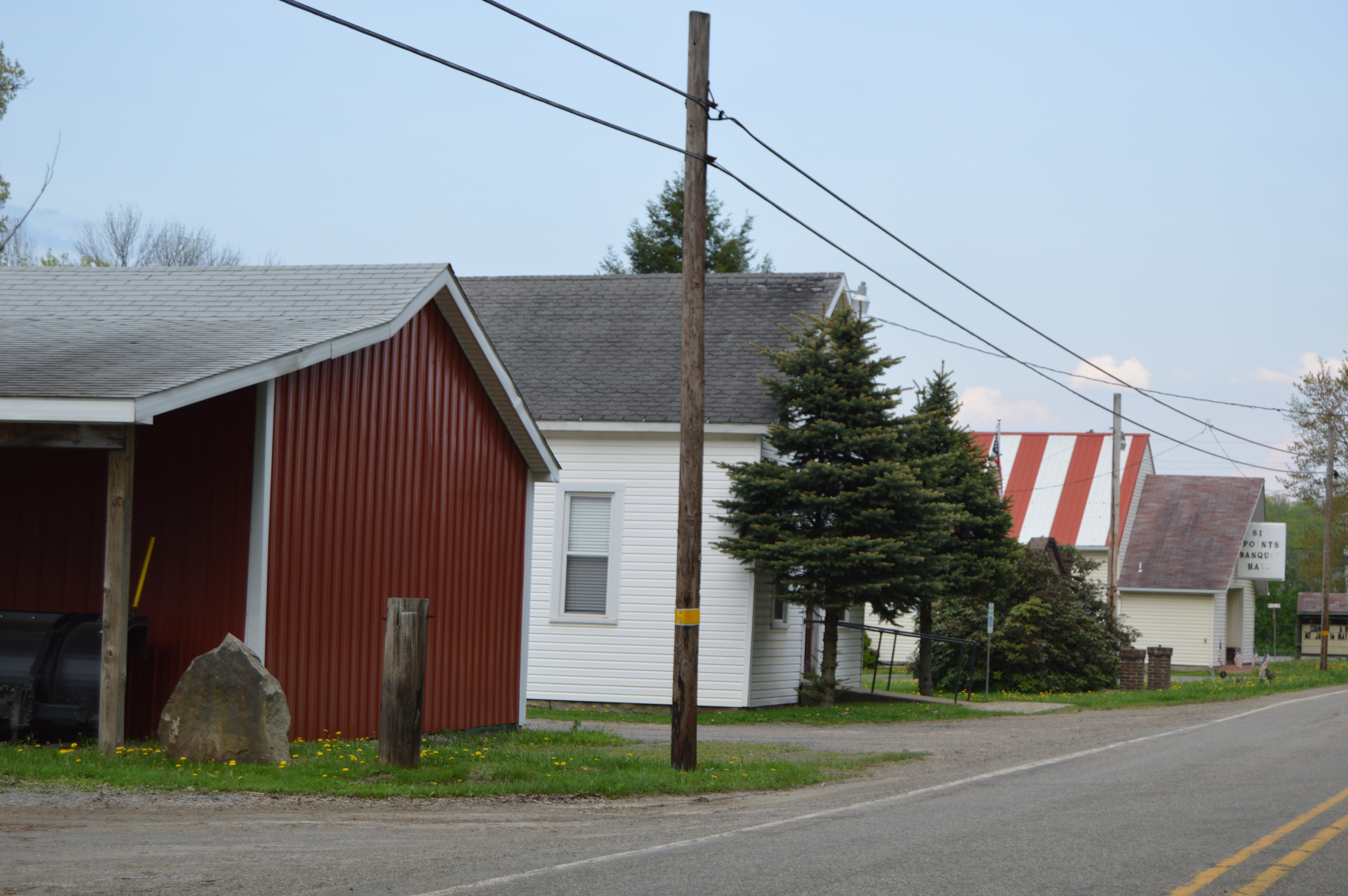
- Buildings on Route 58 at Six Points

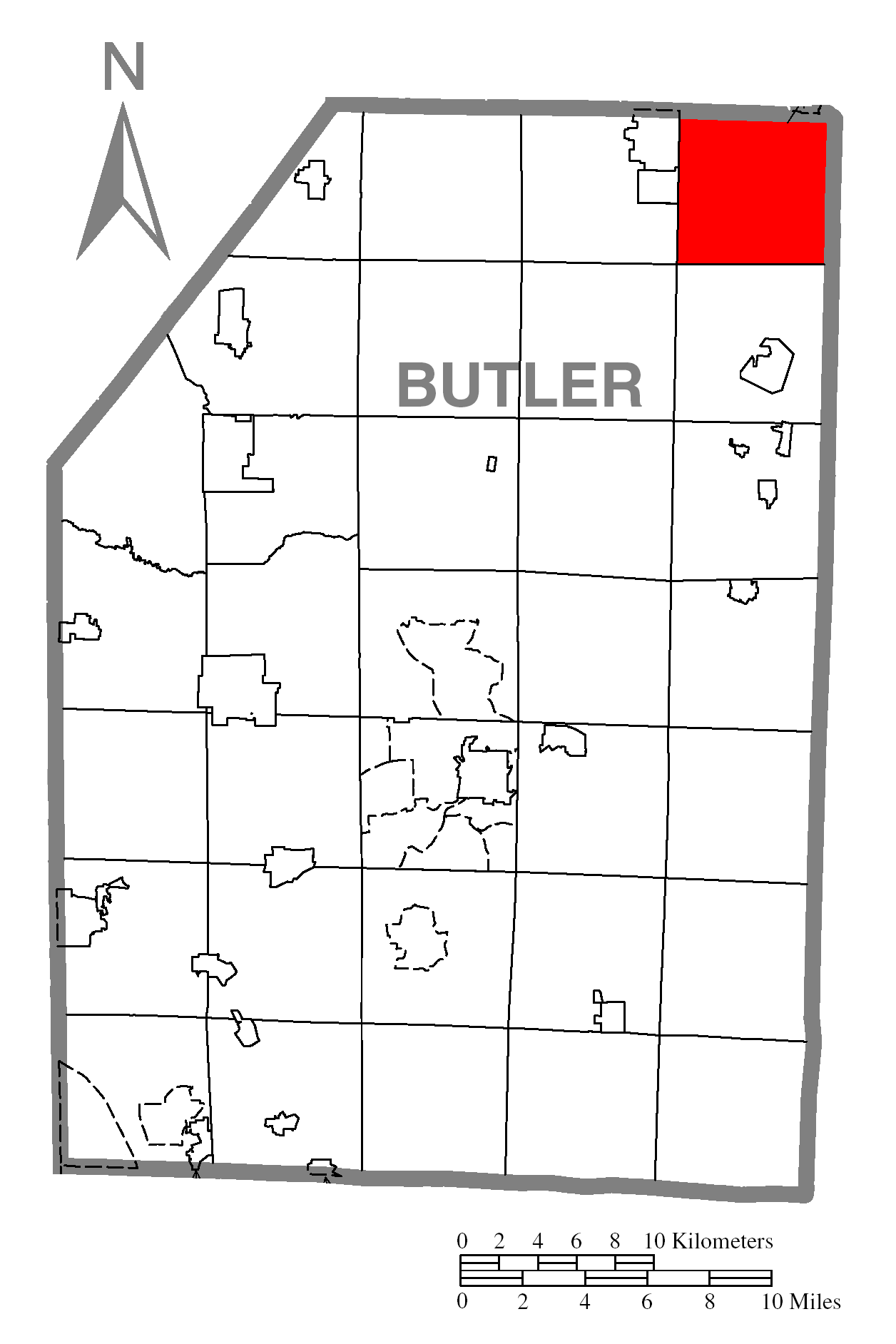
- Map of Butler County, Pennsylvania, highlighting Allegheny Township

- Map of Butler County, Pennsylvania
- Country: United States
- State: Pennsylvania
- County: Butler
- Settled: 1797
- Incorporated: 1854

Area
  - Total: 24.63 sq mi (63.79 km^{2})
  - Land: 24.63 sq mi (63.79 km^{2})
  - Water: 0 sq mi (0.00 km^{2})

Population (2020)
  - Total: 624 ▼
  - Estimate (2022): 613
  - Density: 25.7/sq mi (9.92/km^{2})
- Time zone: UTC-5 (Eastern (EST))
  - Summer (DST): UTC-4 (EDT)
- FIPS code: 42-019-00860

Allegheny Township is a township in Butler County, Pennsylvania, United States. The population was 624 at the 2020 census.

== Geography ==
The township is located in the northeastern corner of Butler County. It is bordered by Parker Township to the south, Washington Township at the southwestern corner, and Venango Township and the boroughs of Eau Claire and Cherry Valley to the west. To the north is Scrubgrass Township in Venango County. To the east is Hovey Township in Armstrong County. The northeastern corner of Allegheny Township just touches the Allegheny River, with Richland Township in Clarion County on the opposite side.

The southwestern end of the Interstate 80 bridge over the Allegheny River is in Allegheny Township, but the interstate highway curves back to the north out of the township 2 miles (3 km) to the west.

The township includes the unincorporated communities of Six Points and Bonus.

According to the United States Census Bureau, the township has a total area of 24.6 square miles (63.8 km^{2}), all land.

== Demographics ==
Historical population
Census	Pop.	Note	%±
2010	641		—
2020	624		−2.7%
2022 (est.)	613		−1.8%
U.S. Decennial Census

As of the 2000 census, there were 555 people, 221 households, and 154 families residing in the township. The population density was 22.9 people per square mile (8.9/km^{2}). There were 373 housing units at an average density of 15.4/sq mi (5.9/km^{2}). The racial makeup of the township was 98% White, 1.6% African American, 0.2% Asian, and 0.2% from two or more races.

There were 221 households, out of which 26.2% had children under the age of 18 living with them, 58.8% were married couples living together, 6.8% had a female householder with no husband present, and 30.3% were non-families. 24.0% of all households were made up of individuals, and 10.4% had someone living alone who was 65 years of age or older. The average household size was 2.51 and the average family size was 2.98.

In the township the population was spread out, with 23.6% under the age of 18, 4.9% from 18 to 24, 27.2% from 25 to 44, 25.6% from 45 to 64, and 18.7% who were 65 years of age or older. The median age was 42 years. For every 100 females there were 98.9 males. For every 100 females age 18 and over, there were 107.8 males.

The median income for a household in the township was $31,484, and the median income for a family was $34,500. Males had a median income of $35,357 versus $26,667 for females. The per capita income for the township was $15,204. About 12.5% of families and 13.6% of the population were below the poverty line, including 11.3% of those under age 18 and 8.2% of those age 65 or over.
