= Cherry Township, Pennsylvania =

Cherry Township is the name of some places in the U.S. state of Pennsylvania:

- Cherry Township, Butler County, Pennsylvania
- Cherry Township, Sullivan County, Pennsylvania
