= Hazen, Pennsylvania =

Hazen may refer to either of two places in the U.S. state of Pennsylvania:

- Hazen, Beaver County, Pennsylvania, an unincorporated community and census-designated place
- Hazen, Jefferson County, Pennsylvania, an unincorporated community
