= Brush Creek (Connoquenessing Creek tributary) =

River in Pennsylvania

Brush Creek Tributary to Connoquenessing Creek
- Location of Brush Creek mouth Brush Creek (Connoquenessing Creek tributary) (the United States)

Location
- Country: United States of America
- State: Pennsylvania
- County: Allegheny; Beaver; Butler

Physical characteristics
- Source: divide between Brush Creek and Pine Creek (Allegheny River)
  - location: Warrendale, Pennsylvania
  - coordinates: 40°38′32″N 80°03′48″W
  - elevation: 1,160 ft (350 m)
- Mouth: Connoquenessing Creek
  - location: Hazen, Beaver County, Pennsylvania
  - coordinates: 40°49′09″N 80°14′49″W
  - elevation: 860 ft (260 m)
- Length: 21.08 mi (33.92 km)
- Basin size: 56.15 square miles (145.4 km^{2})
- Discharge
  - average: 57.53 cu ft/s (1.629 m^{3}/s) at mouth with Connoquenessing Creek

Basin features
- Progression: Connoquenessing Creek → Beaver River → Ohio River → Mississippi River → Gulf of Mexico
- River system: Beaver River
- Tributaries
  - left: unnamed tributaries
  - right: unnamed tributaries

Brush Creek is a tributary of Connoquenessing Creek in western Pennsylvania. The stream rises in northwestern Allegheny County and flows 21.08 miles (33.92 km) northwest, entering Connoquenessing Creek at Hazen. The watershed is roughly 35% agricultural, 42% forested and the rest is other uses.
