= Hazen, Beaver County, Pennsylvania =

Unincorporated community in Pennsylvania, US

- Census-designated place
- Location within Pennsylvania Location within the United States
- Coordinates: 40°49′0″N 80°14′42″W
- Country: United States
- State: Pennsylvania
- County: Beaver
- Township: North Sewickley
- Elevation: 923 ft (281 m)

Population (2020)
  - Total: 163
- Time zone: UTC-4 (EST)
  - Summer (DST): UTC-5 (EDT)
- Area code: 724
- GNIS feature ID: 1176716

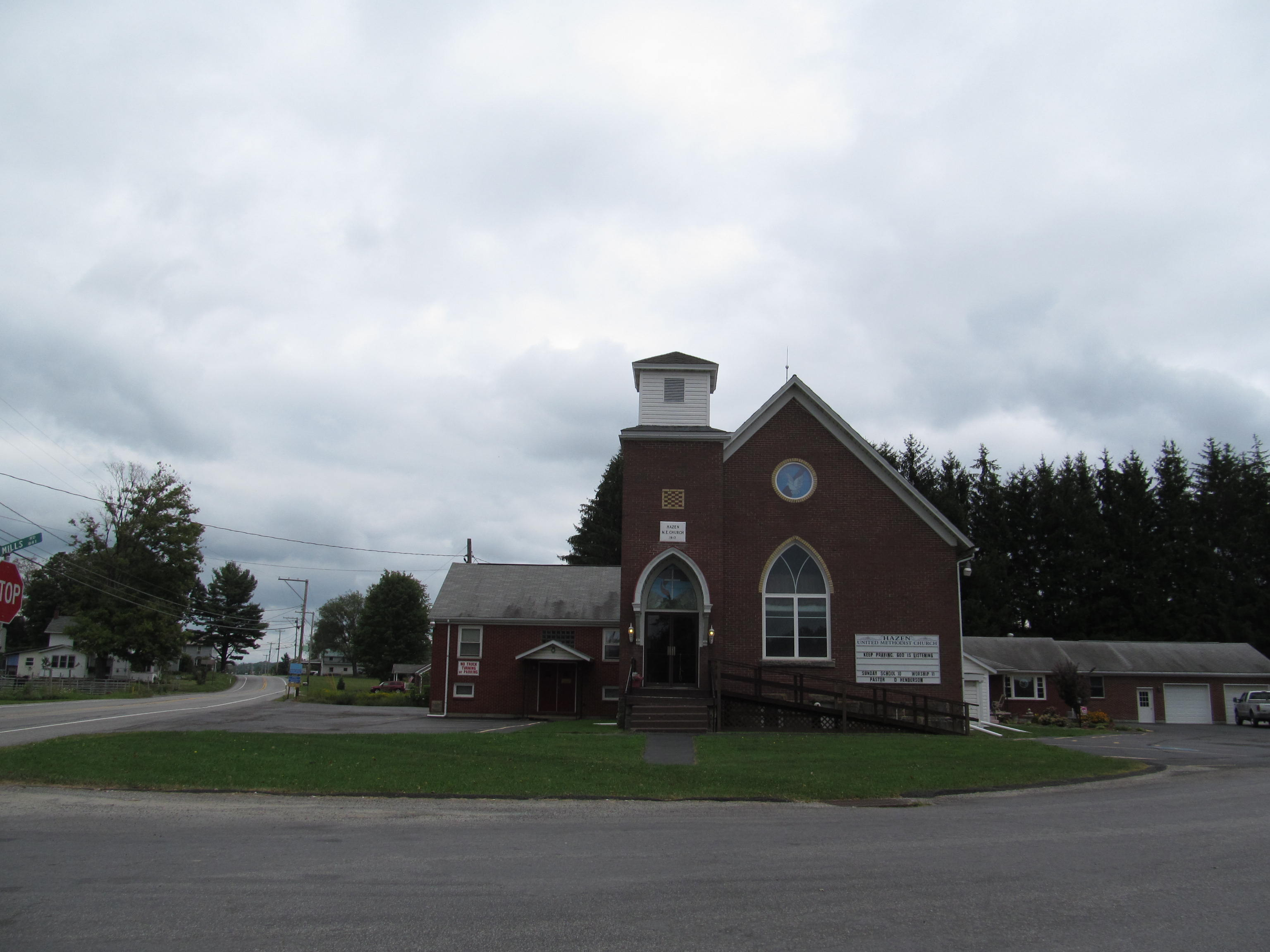
Hazen, Pennsylvania

Hazen is an unincorporated community and census-designated place in North Sewickley Township, Beaver County, Pennsylvania, United States. It sits on the southwestern side of Connoquenessing Creek, where Brush Creek flows into it. It is 4 miles (6 km) southeast of Ellwood City and 8 miles (13 km) northeast of Beaver Falls. Via Connoquenessing Creek, Hazen is part of the Beaver River watershed flowing to the Ohio River. The population of Hazen was 163 as of the 2020 census.
