= Fombell, Pennsylvania =

Unincorporated community in Pennsylvania, U.S.

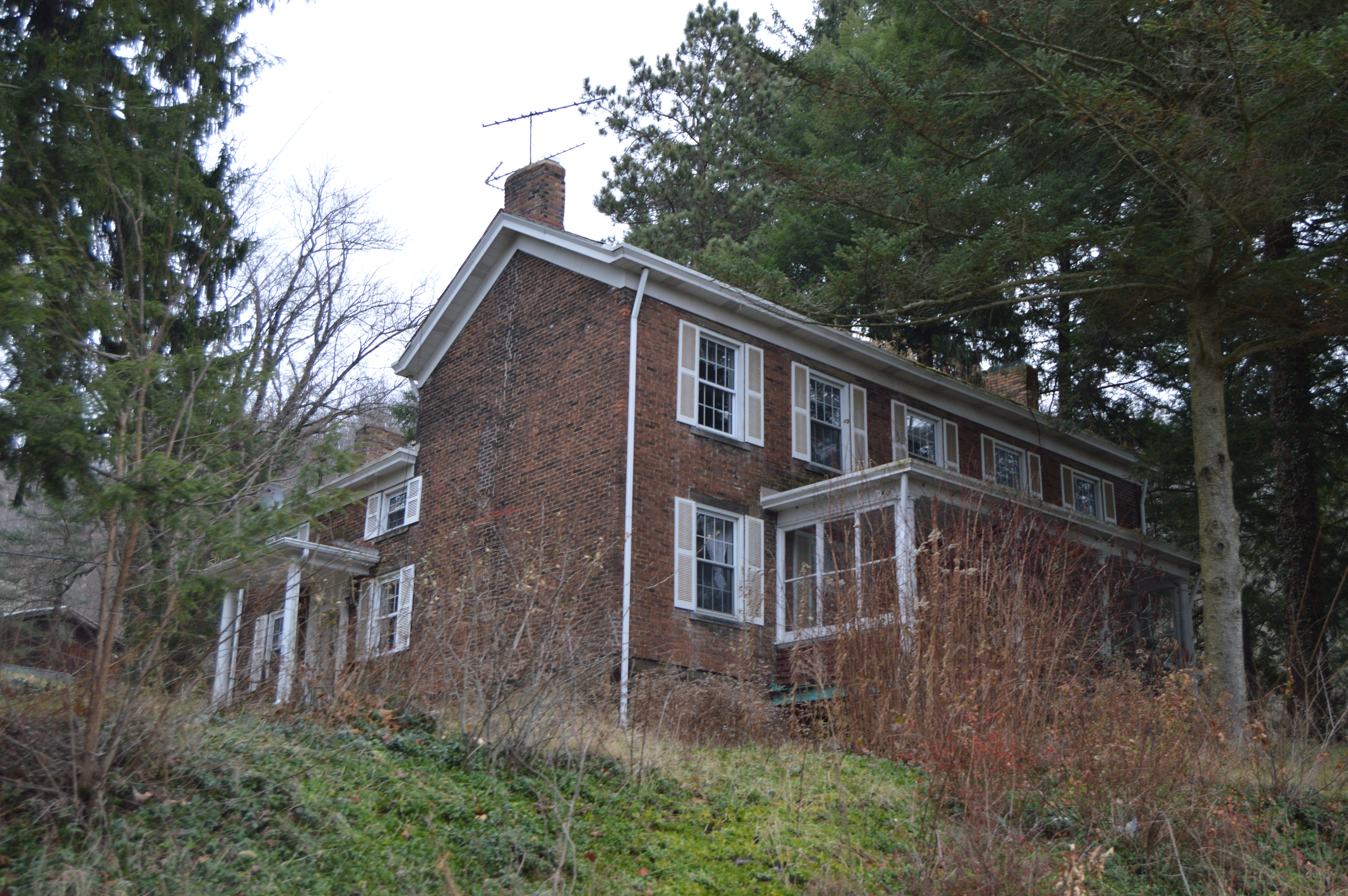
The Fombell House, built in 1829

Fombell is an unincorporated community that includes both Franklin Township and Marion Township, Beaver County, Pennsylvania, United States. Its U.S. postal zip code is 16123. Its elevation ranges from 879 feet (268 m) along the creek to 1280 feet on top of the hills, and it is located at 40°48′34″N 80°12′6″W (40.8095093, -80.2017277).

Located along the Connoquenessing Creek, northwest of Zelienople, Fombell lies in the northeastern corner of Beaver County. It was originally the location of a station of the narrow gauge Pittsburgh and Western Railroad.
