= Hilliards, Pennsylvania =

Unincorporated village in Pennsylvania, U.S.

Coordinates: 41°05′09″N 79°50′00″W

Hilliards is an unincorporated village that is located in Washington Township, Butler County, Pennsylvania, United States.

== History ==
The village of Hilliards started out as a mill town, known as Hilliards Mills. Named for the owner of the gristmill, it became known as Hilliards Station in 1876 when the Shenango and Allegheny Railroad extended a small route to the community to provide service to local coal and oil industries.

The village of Hilliards became the southern terminal for the line and provided passenger service for the villages of Eau Claire, Argentine, Annisville, North Washington, Higgins Corners, and Whiskerville until 1935.

Eventually, the Bessemer and Lake Erie Railroad assumed control over the line and called it the Hilliards Branch.

During the early 1990s, the railroad was abandoned and removed.

== Geography ==
The headwaters of the popular Slippery Rock Creek is formed in Hilliards, which continues through northern Butler County, then flows through the scenic McConnells Mill State Park, until it is received by Connoquenessing Creek in Ellwood City.

Today, the community is much quieter than from the railroad days, but is still serviced by a small church; however, the town's post office has closed.
