= Mercer Township, Pennsylvania =

Township in Pennsylvania, US

Coordinates: 41°08′17″N 79°59′11″W

- Township
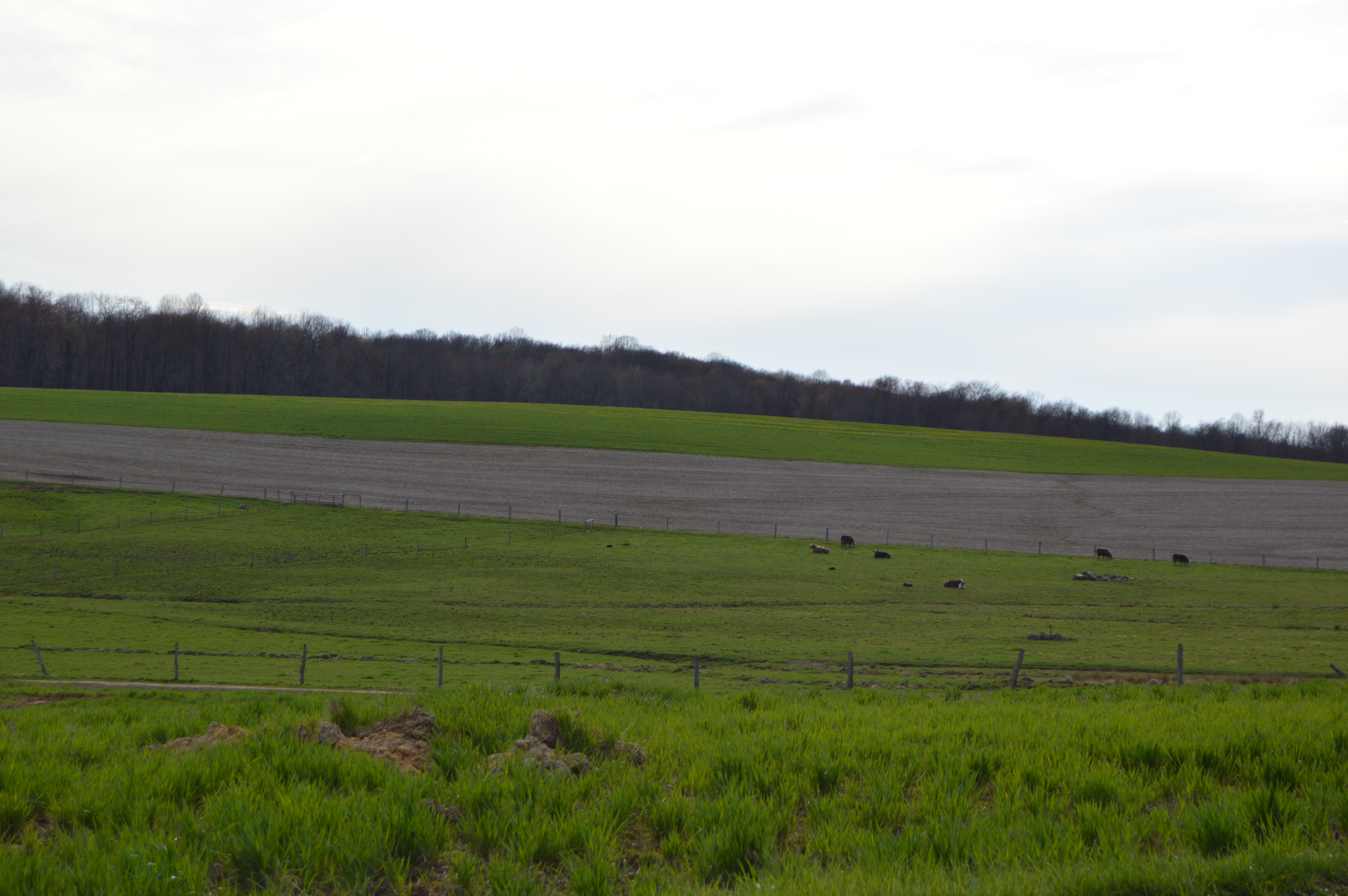
- Fields north of Harrisville

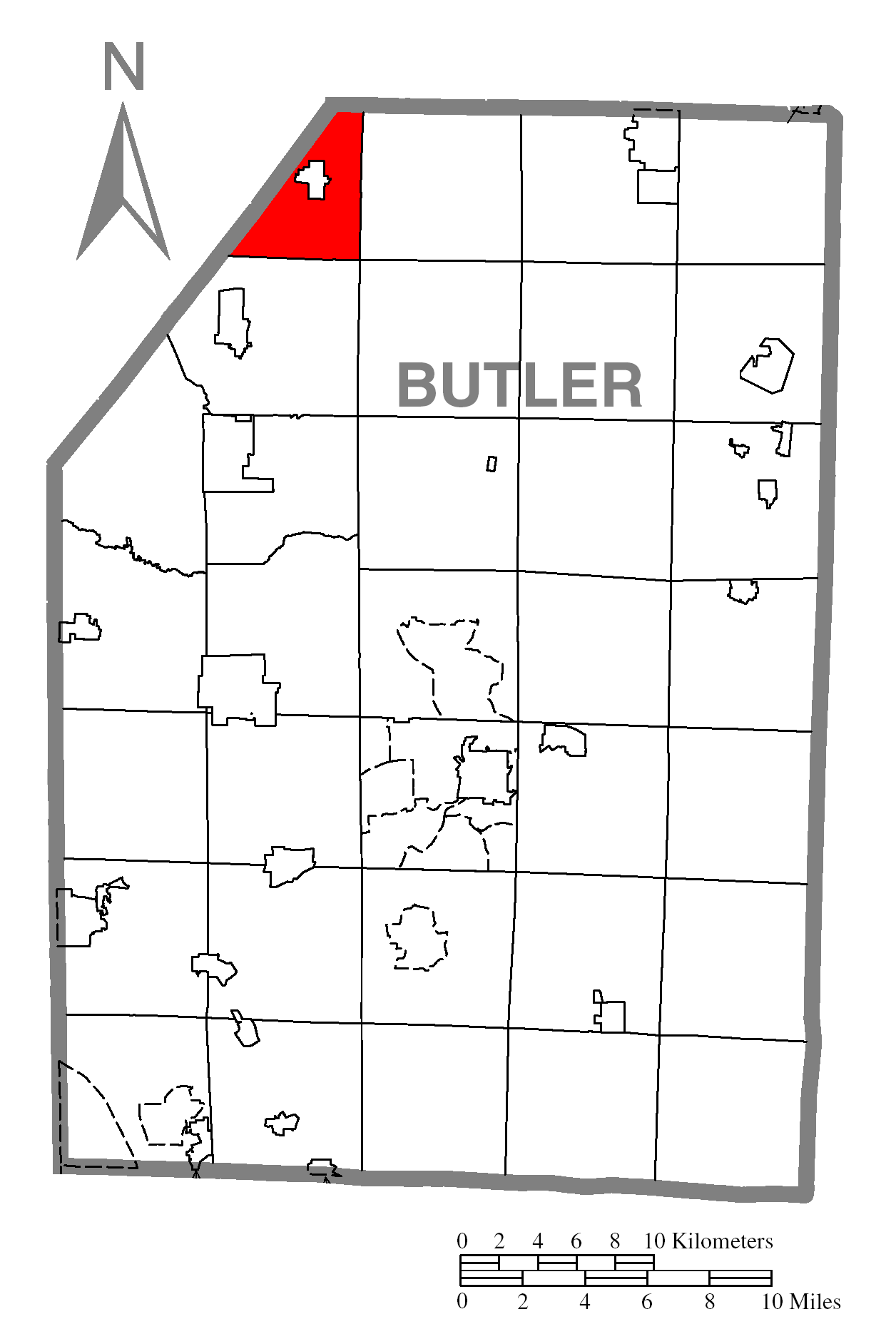
- Map of Butler County, Pennsylvania, highlighting Mercer Township

- Map of Butler County, Pennsylvania
- Country: United States
- State: Pennsylvania
- County: Butler
- Settled: 1797
- Incorporated: 1804

Area
  - Total: 12.89 sq mi (33.38 km^{2})
  - Land: 12.88 sq mi (33.36 km^{2})
  - Water: 0.0077 sq mi (0.02 km^{2})

Population (2020)
  - Total: 1,010 ▼
  - Estimate (2022): 1,016
  - Density: 83.2/sq mi (32.11/km^{2})
- Time zone: UTC-5 (Eastern (EST))
  - Summer (DST): UTC-4 (EDT)
- FIPS code: 42-019-48688
- Website: https://mercertwpbutler.com/

Mercer Township is a township in Butler County, Pennsylvania, United States. The population was 1,010 at the 2020 census.

== Geography ==
Mercer Township forms the northwestern border of Butler County, with Mercer County to the northwest and Venango County to the north. The township surrounds the borough of Harrisville but is a separate entity. The unincorporated community of Forestville is in the south.

According to the United States Census Bureau, the township has a total area of 12.9 square miles (33.4 km^{2}), of which 0.008 square miles (0.02 km^{2}), or 0.06%, is water.

== Demographics ==
Historical population
Census	Pop.	Note	%±
1840	1,233		—
1850	1,296		5.1%
1860	545		−57.9%
1870	478		−12.3%
1880	985		106.1%
1890	1,093		11.0%
1900	684		−37.4%
1910	813		18.9%
1920	776		−4.6%
1930	779		0.4%
1940	845		8.5%
1950	845		0.0%
1960	848		0.4%
1970	924		9.0%
1980	1,103		19.4%
1990	1,110		0.6%
2000	1,183		6.6%
2010	1,100		−7.0%
2020	1,010		−8.2%
2022 (est.)	1,016		0.6%
U.S. Decennial Census

As of the 2000 census, there were 1,183 people, 473 households, and 333 families residing in the township. The population density was 92.9 inhabitants per square mile (35.9/km^{2}). There were 503 housing units at an average density of 39.5 per square mile (15.3/km^{2}). The racial makeup of the township was 98.99% White, 0.51% African American, and 0.51% from two or more races. Hispanic or Latino of any race were 0.59% of the population.

There were 473 households, out of which 27.5% had children under the age of 18 living with them, 57.7% were married couples living together, 9.5% had a female householder with no husband present, and 29.4% were non-families. 23.7% of all households were made up of individuals, and 6.8% had someone living alone who was 65 years of age or older. The average household size was 2.50 and the average family size was 2.97.

In the township the population was spread out, with 22.3% under the age of 18, 8.1% from 18 to 24, 30.4% from 25 to 44, 25.9% from 45 to 64, and 13.3% who were 65 years of age or older. The median age was 39 years. For every 100 females there were 100.8 males. For every 100 females age 18 and over, there were 99.8 males.

The median income for a household in the township was $35,000, and the median income for a family was $43,000. Males had a median income of $32,031 versus $18,571 for females. The per capita income for the township was $17,205. About 6.9% of families and 11.2% of the population were below the poverty line, including 13.2% of those under age 18 and 6.1% of those age 65 or over.
