= Harrisville, Pennsylvania =

Borough in Pennsylvania, US

- Borough
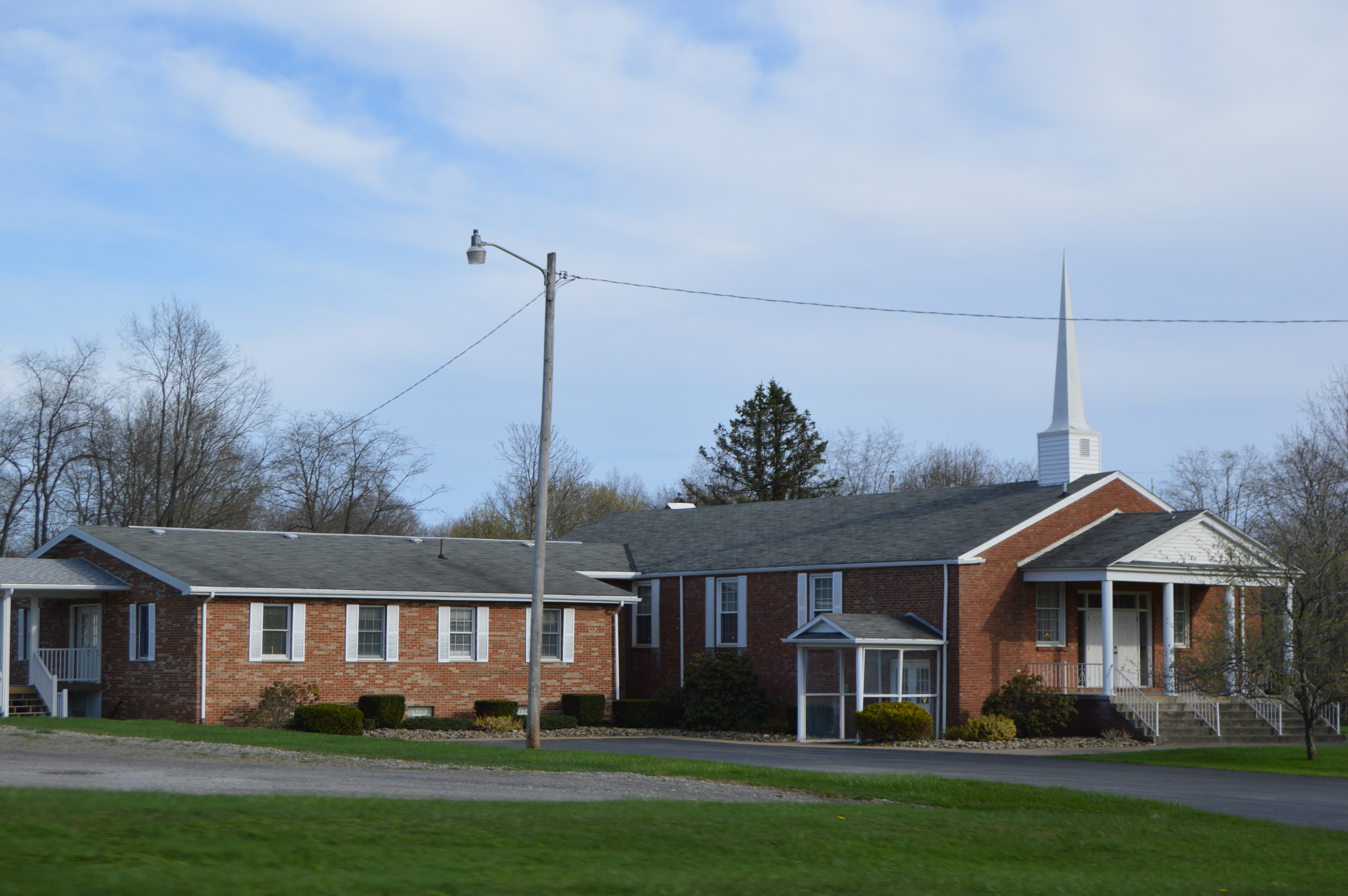
- Calvary Orthodox Presbyterian Church on Main Street

- Location of Harrisville in Butler County, Pennsylvania.

- Location within Pennsylvania
- Coordinates: 41°08′06″N 80°00′35″W
- Country: United States
- State: Pennsylvania
- County: Butler
- Settled: 1826
- Incorporated: 1846

Government
  - Type: Borough Council

Area
  - Total: 0.81 sq mi (2.09 km^{2})
  - Land: 0.80 sq mi (2.08 km^{2})
  - Water: 0.0039 sq mi (0.01 km^{2})

Population (2020)
  - Total: 819
  - Density: 1,018.9/sq mi (393.39/km^{2})
- Time zone: UTC-5 (Eastern (EST))
  - Summer (DST): UTC-4 (EDT)
- Zip code: 16038
- Area code: 724
- FIPS code: 42-32896
- Website: https://harrisvilleboroughpa.gov/

Harrisville is a borough in Butler County, Pennsylvania, United States. As of the 2020 census, Harrisville had a population of 819.

== History ==
The Seneca people used the Harrisville area for growing corn due to its fertile soil and flat growing area.

Col. Robert Reed built a tavern and a distillery just south of present-day Harrisville in 1797. This was the first tavern between Pittsburgh and Franklin, Pennsylvania.

Harrisville was founded in 1826 by Ephraim Harris. Harrisville was incorporated in 1846 by joining Harrisville and Reedsville. Harrisville had its first school in 1830, and in 1856 a high school was built.

== Geography ==
Harrisville is located near the northwestern border of Butler County at 41°8′6″N 80°0′35″W (41.134966, −80.009590). Pennsylvania Routes 8 and 58 intersect in the center of the borough. Route 8 leads south 21 miles (34 km) to Butler, the county seat, and north 21 miles (34 km) to Franklin on the Allegheny River, while Route 58 leads east 18 miles (29 km) to Foxburg on the Allegheny River and west 4 miles (6 km) to Grove City. Harrisville is drained by McMurray Run, a tributary of Slippery Rock Creek.

According to the United States Census Bureau, Harrisville has a total area of 0.81 square miles (2.1 km^{2}), of which 0.004 square miles (0.01 km^{2}), or 0.40%, is water.

== Demographics ==
Historical population
Census	Pop.	Note	%±
1850	235		—
1860	357		51.9%
1870	352		−1.4%
1880	352		0.0%
1890	386		9.7%
1900	319		−17.4%
1910	352		10.3%
1920	359		2.0%
1930	583		62.4%
1940	626		7.4%
1950	780		24.6%
1960	896		14.9%
1970	944		5.4%
1980	1,033		9.4%
1990	862		−16.6%
2000	883		2.4%
2010	897		1.6%
2020	819		−8.7%

As of the 2000 census, there were 883 people, 323 households, and 231 families residing in the borough. The population density was 1,079.5 inhabitants per square mile (416.8/km^{2}). There were 346 housing units at an average density of 423.0 per square mile (163.3/km^{2}). The racial makeup of the borough was 98.19% White, 0.57% African American, 0.11% Native American, 0.11% Asian, 0.79% from other races, and 0.23% from two or more races. Hispanic or Latino of any race were 0.11% of the population.

There were 323 households, in 28.8% of which children under the age of 18 lived; 60.4% consisted of married couples living together; 8.4% had a female householder with no husband present; and 28.2% were non-family households. 24.5% of all households were made up of individuals, and 9.3% had someone living alone who was 65 years of age or older. The average household size was 2.45 and the average family size was 2.92.

In the borough the population was spread out, with 20.5% under the age of 18, 6.9% from 18 to 24, 24.7% from 25 to 44, 24.1% from 45 to 64, and 23.8% who were 65 years of age or older. The median age was 43 years. For every 100 females there were 95.8 males. For every 100 females age 18 and over, there were 92.9 males.

The median income for a household in the borough was $31,964, and the median income for a family was $35,455. Males had a median income of $29,167 versus $17,500 for females. The per capita income for the borough was $12,683. About 8.8% of families and 13.4% of the population were below the poverty line, including 21.6% of those under age 18 and 13.6% of those age 65 or over.

== Education ==
It is in the Slippery Rock Area School District.

== Notable people ==
- Donald C. Cubbison (1882–1968), US Army major general, born in Harrisville
- Ella Hamilton Durley (c. 1852 – 1922), educator, newspaper editor, and journalist
