= Plain Grove Township, Pennsylvania =

Township in Pennsylvania, US

Coordinates: 41°04′21″N 80°07′35″W

Plain Grove Township
- Township
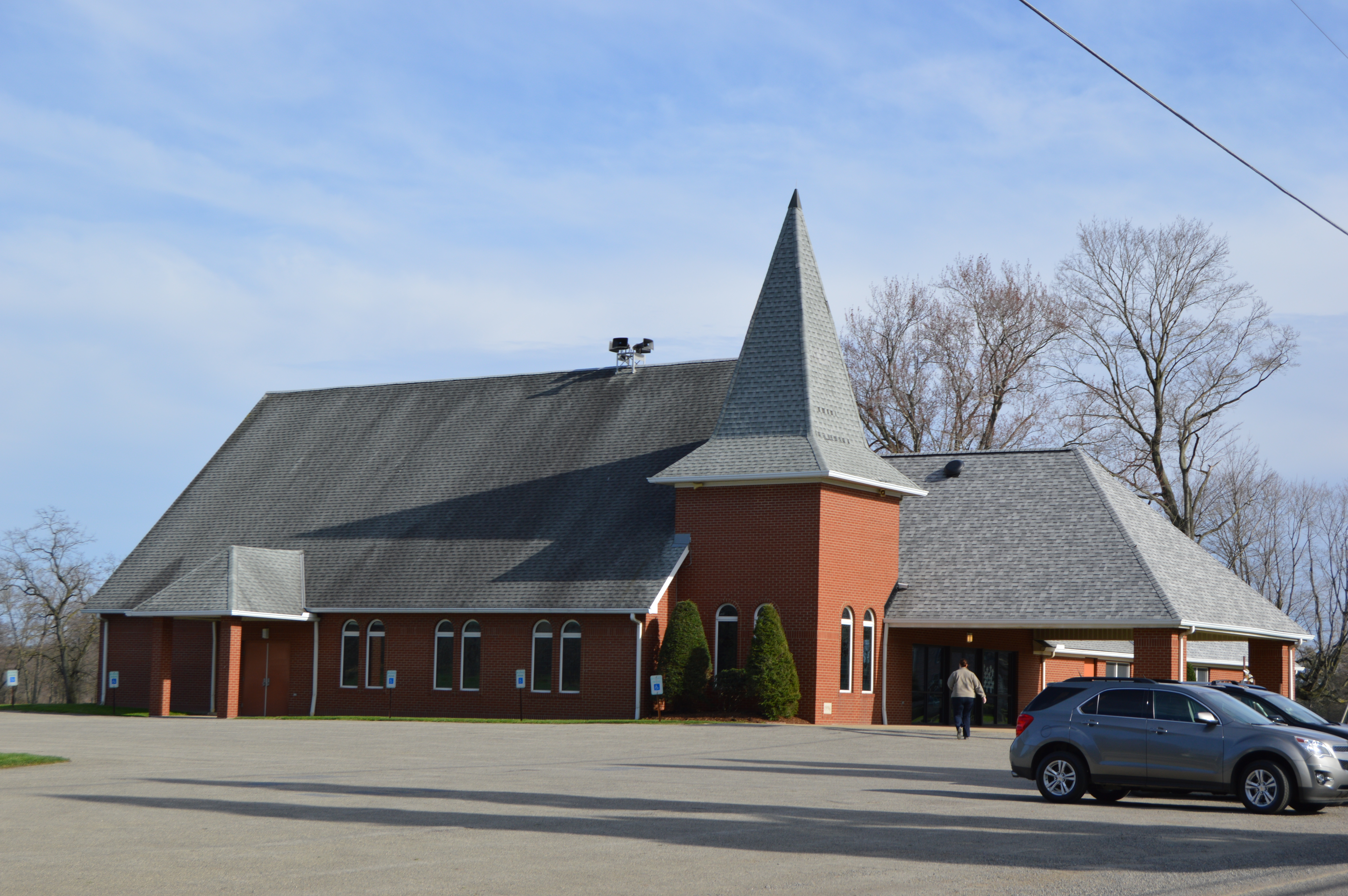
- Plain Grove Presbyterian Church

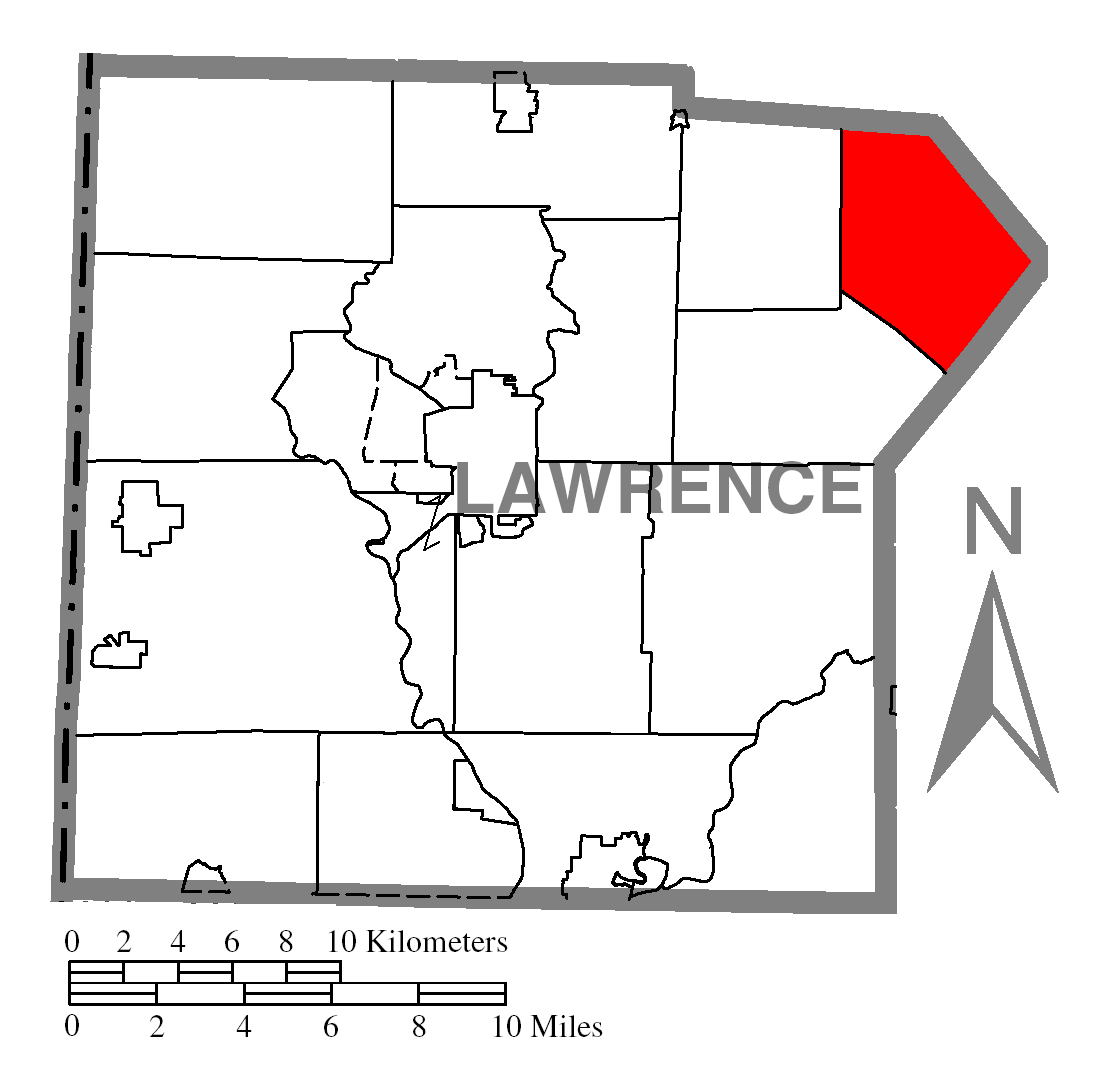
- Location of Plain Grove Township in Lawrence County

- Location of Lawrence County in Pennsylvania
- Country: United States
- State: Pennsylvania
- County: Lawrence
- Established: 1855

Area
  - Total: 17.93 sq mi (46.44 km^{2})
  - Land: 17.81 sq mi (46.13 km^{2})
  - Water: 0.12 sq mi (0.31 km^{2})
- Highest elevation (south of Brent): 1,330 ft (410 m)
- Lowest elevation (Slippery Rock Creek): 1,060 ft (320 m)

Population (2020)
  - Total: 778
  - Estimate (2022): 764
  - Density: 44.1/sq mi (17.04/km^{2})
- Time zone: UTC-4 (EST)
  - Summer (DST): UTC-5 (EDT)
- Area code: 724
- FIPS code: 42-073-61104
- Website: www.plaingrovetwp.org

Historical population
Census	Pop.	Note	%±
2000	854		—
2010	813		−4.8%
2020	777		−4.4%
2022 (est.)	764		−1.7%
U.S. Decennial Census

Plain Grove Township is a township in Lawrence County, Pennsylvania, United States. The population was 777 at the time of the 2020 census, a decline from the figure of 813 tabulated in 2010.

== Geography ==
According to the United States Census Bureau, the township has a total area of 18.0 square miles (46.5 km^{2}), of which 17.9 square miles (46.3 km^{2}) is land and 0.1 square miles (0.2 km^{2}), or 0.50%, is water.

The township includes the unincorporated communities of Brent, Plain Grove, and Elliotts Mills.

== Demographics ==
As of the census of 2000, there were 854 people, 316 households, and 243 families residing in the township. The population density was 47.7 inhabitants per square mile (18.4/km^{2}). There were 351 housing units at an average density of 19.6/sq mi (7.6/km^{2}).

The racial makeup of the township was 98.95% White, 0.23% African American, 0.35% Asian, and 0.47% from two or more races. Hispanic or Latino of any race were 0.47% of the population.

There were 316 households, out of which 36.4% had children under the age of 18 living with them, 65.5% were married couples living together, 8.2% had a female householder with no husband present, and 23.1% were non-families. 18.0% of all households were made up of individuals, and 6.6% had someone living alone who was 65 years of age or older. The average household size was 2.70 and the average family size was 3.10.

In the township the population was spread out, with 26.3% under the age of 18, 6.1% from 18 to 24, 32.2% from 25 to 44, 22.4% from 45 to 64, and 13.0% who were 65 years of age or older. The median age was 38 years. For every 100 females, there were 100.0 males. For every 100 females age 18 and over, there were 97.8 males.

The median income for a household in the township was $37,000, and the median income for a family was $41,083. Males had a median income of $30,385 versus $20,156 for females. The per capita income for the township was $15,807.

Roughly 5.8% of families and 10.8% of the population were below the poverty line, including 20.3% of those under age 18 and 2.0% of those age 65 or over.

== Education ==
The Wilmington Area School District serves the township.

== Transportation ==
=== Major roads and highways ===
- I-79
- PA 108
