= Boyers, Pennsylvania =

Unincorporated village in Pennsylvania, US

Coordinates: 41°06′30″N 79°53′56″W

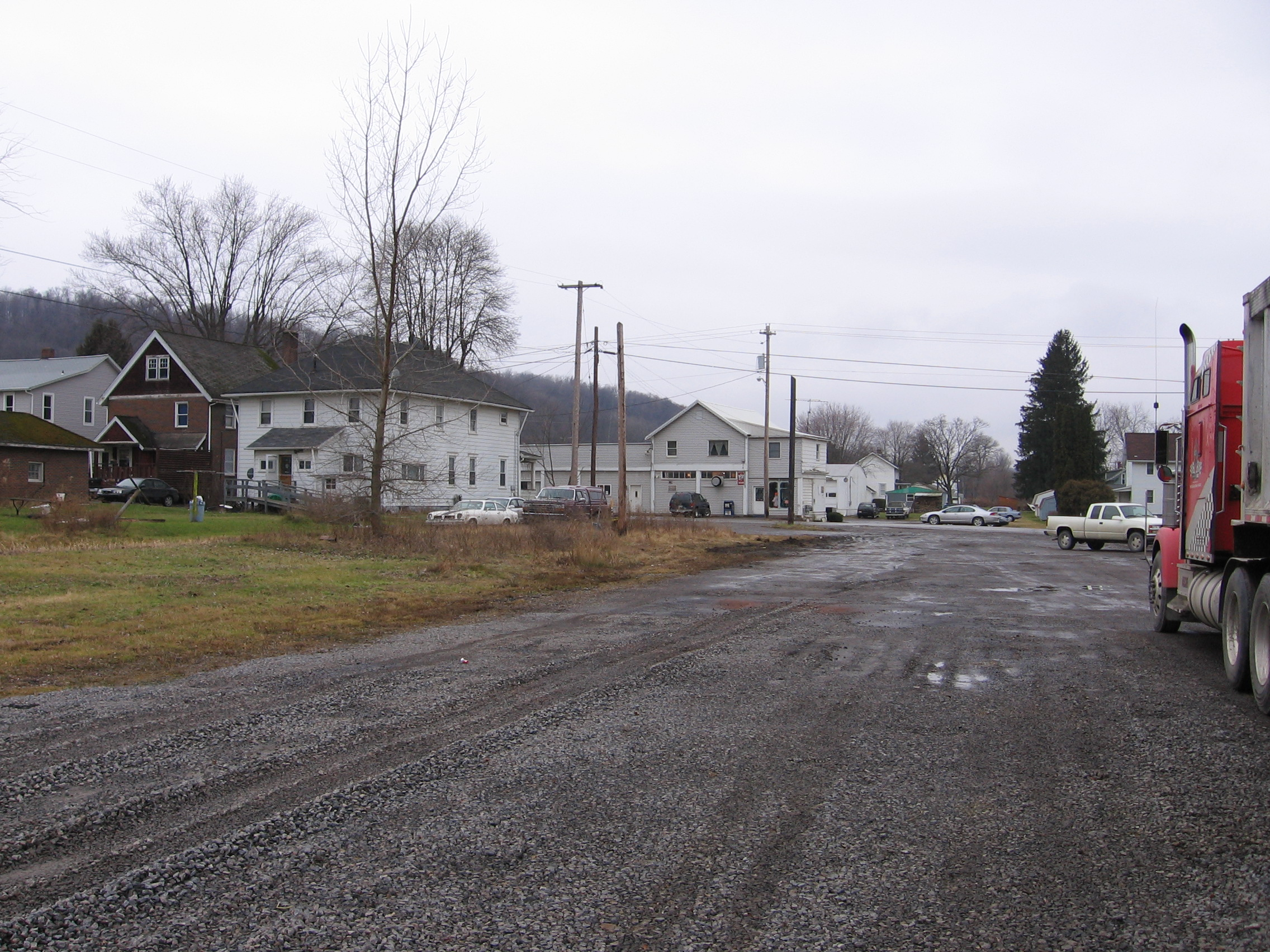
Boyers, Pennsylvania

Boyers is an unincorporated village in Marion Township, Butler County, Pennsylvania, United States. It has a small population with a few businesses located in the center of the town. Slippery Rock Creek flows through the community. The creek's source is a few miles to the east, in the small village of Hilliards. Pennsylvania Route 308 is one of the main roads in the area, running through the center of Boyers.

== History ==
Boyers was a large mining community at the turn of the twentieth century, serviced by a branch of the Bessemer and Lake Erie Railroad known as the Hilliards branch. The rails were removed in the early 2000s.

=== Iron Mountain facility ===
The abandoned mines have provided opportunities for underground storage facilities since 1954. The Iron Mountain Corporation merged with the longtime owner of the facility in 1998 and operates a large storage facility located in a former limestone mine close to Boyers. The Corbis photographic collection is stored there.

The United States Office of Personnel Management (OPM) operates a highly secure facility in an abandoned mine in Boyers which contains all the documents from security clearance proceedings. OPM also operates its processing center for retired federal employees in Boyers. At an underground limestone mine, the retirement of federal employees is processed on paper by hand, and the information is stored in file cabinets. It takes an average of 61 days to process the retirement of each federal employee.

The United States Patent and Trademark Office stores original records in the Iron Mountain facility.

== Demographics ==
Historical population
Census	Pop.	Note	%±
2023 (est.)	155

The United States Census Bureau defined Boyers as a census designated place (CDP) in 2023.
