= Forestville, Butler County, Pennsylvania =

Forestville, Pennsylvania
- Unincorporated community Census designated place
- Location of Butler County in Pennsylvania

- Location within Pennsylvania Location within the United States
- Coordinates: 41°6′21.6″N 80°0′21.6″W
- Country: United States
- State: Pennsylvania
- County: Butler
- Township: Mercer
- Elevation: 1,329 ft (405 m)

Population (2023)
  - Total: 280
- Time zone: UTC-5 (Eastern (EST))
  - Summer (DST): UTC-4 (EDT)
- GNIS feature ID: 2830792

Forestville, Butler County, Pennsylvania is an unincorporated community and census designated place (CDP) in Mercer Township, Butler County, in the U.S. state of Pennsylvania.

== Demographics ==
Historical population
Census	Pop.	Note	%±
2023 (est.)	280

The United States Census Bureau defined Forestville as a census designated place in 2023.
