= Washington Township, Butler County, Pennsylvania =

Township in Pennsylvania, US

Coordinates: 41°04′30″N 79°50′38″W

- Township
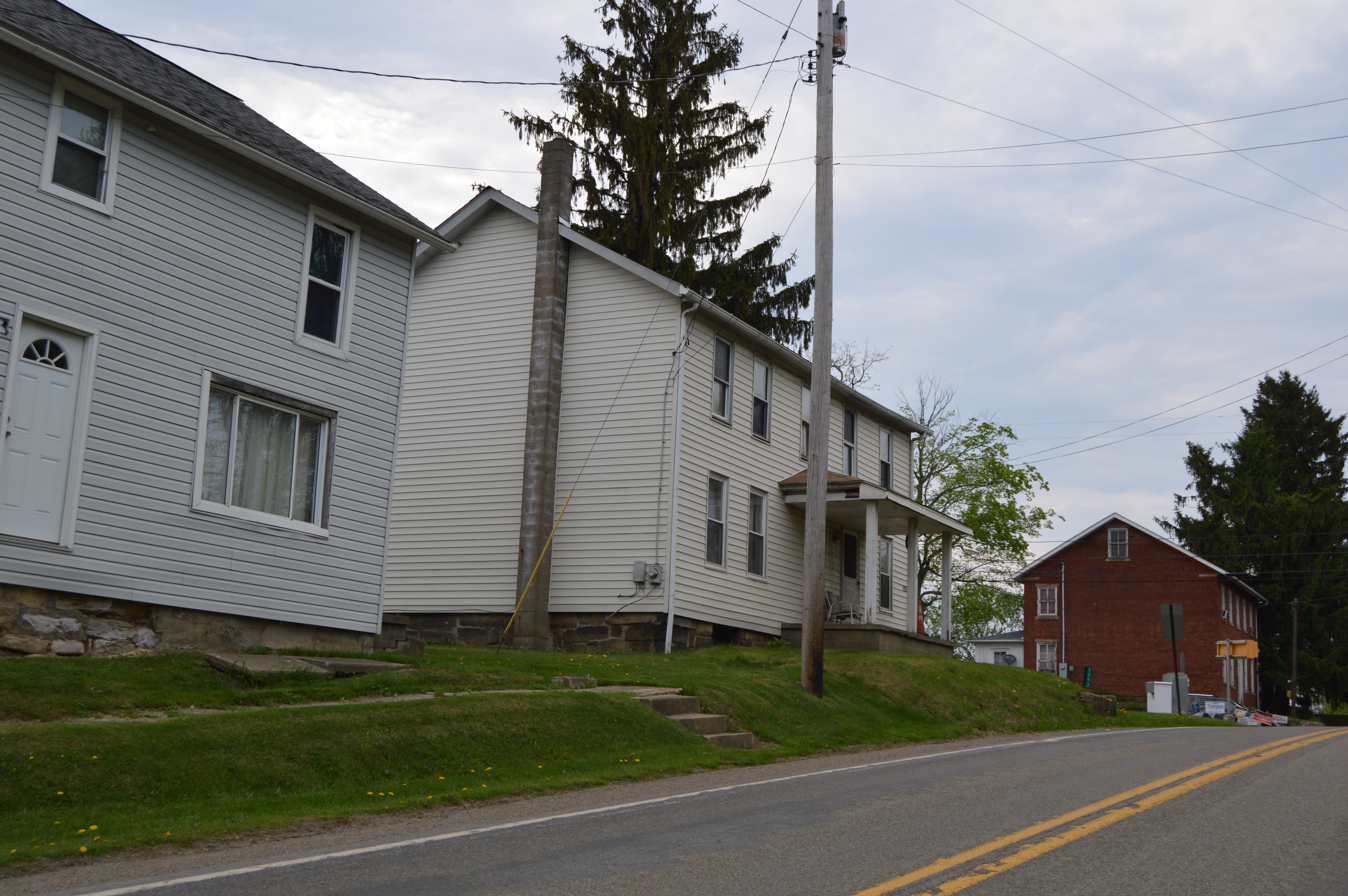
- Pennsylvania Route 38 at North Washington

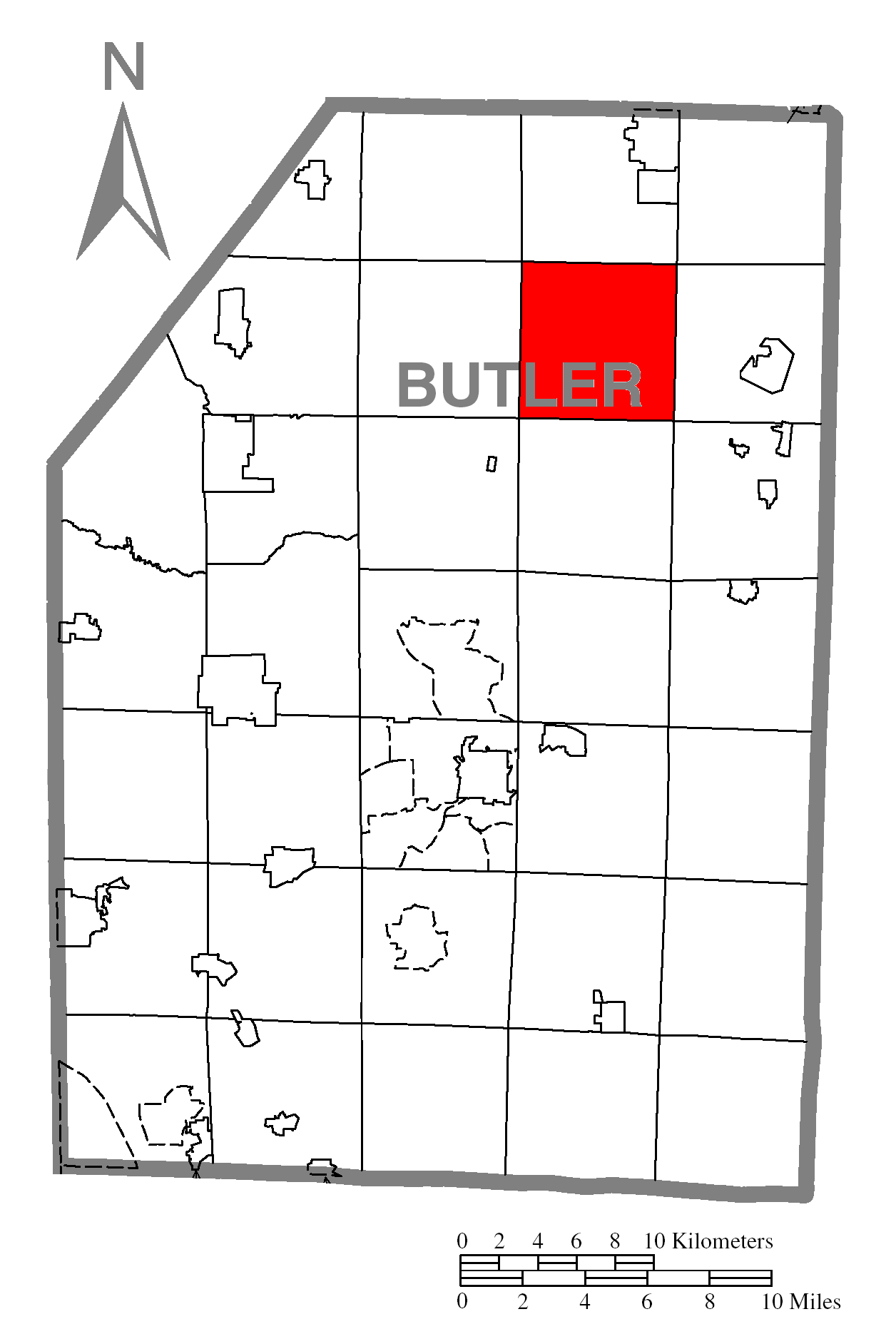
- Map of Butler County, Pennsylvania, highlighting Washington Township

- Map of Butler County, Pennsylvania
- Country: United States
- State: Pennsylvania
- County: Butler
- Settled: 1796
- Incorporated: 1846

Area
  - Total: 24.96 sq mi (64.64 km^{2})
  - Land: 24.93 sq mi (64.58 km^{2})
  - Water: 0.023 sq mi (0.06 km^{2})

Population (2020)
  - Total: 1,287 ▼
  - Estimate (2022): 1,260
  - Density: 50.1/sq mi (19.34/km^{2})
- Time zone: UTC-5 (Eastern (EST))
  - Summer (DST): UTC-4 (EDT)
- FIPS code: 42-019-81192

Washington Township is a township that is located in Butler County, Pennsylvania, United States. The population was 1,287 at the time of the 2020 census.

== Geography ==
Washington Township is located in northeastern Butler County and contains the unincorporated communities of Hilliards, Argentine, Annisville, Whiskerville, Parsonville, and North Washington.

Slippery Rock Creek rises in the northern part of the township.

According to the United States Census Bureau, the township has a total area of 24.9 square miles (64.6 km^{2}), of which 0.023 square miles (0.06 km^{2}), or 0.09%, is water.

== Demographics ==
Historical population
Census	Pop.	Note	%±
2010	1,300		—
2020	1,287		−1.0%
2022 (est.)	1,260		−2.1%
U.S. Decennial Census

As of the 2000 census, there were 1,419 people, 511 households, and 396 families living in the township.

The population density was 56.7 inhabitants per square mile (21.9/km^{2}). There were 560 housing units at an average density of 22.4/sq mi (8.6/km^{2}).

The racial makeup of the township was 98.8% White, 0.1% African American, 0.6% Native American, 0.2% Asian, 0.1% from other races, and 0.2% from two or more races.

There were 511 households, out of which 37.2% had children under the age of eighteen living with them; 64.0% were married couples living together, 10.0% had a female householder with no husband present, and 22.5% were non-families. Of all of the households documented, 18.0% were made up of individuals, and 7.0% had someone living alone who was sixty-five years of age or older.

The average household size was 2.78 and the average family size was 3.15.

Within the township, the population was spread out, with 28.4% of residents who were under the age of 18, 6.4% from 18 to 24, 31.1% from 25 to 44, 22.1% from 45 to 64, and 11.9% who were 65 years of age or older. The median age was 36 years.

For every 100 females there were 94.1 males. For every 100 females age 18 and over, there were 98.1 males.

The median income for a household in the township was $31,645, and the median income for a family was $35,563. Males had a median income of $30,966 compared with that of $24,250 for females.

The per capita income for the township was $13,464.

Approximately 13.6% of families and 16.5% of the population were living below the poverty line, including 18.3% of those who were under the age of eighteen and 13.5% of those who were aged sixty-five or older.
