= Wolf Creek (Slippery Rock Creek tributary) =

Stream in Pennsylvania, USA

Wolf Creek Tributary to Slippery Rock Creek
- Location of Wolf Creek mouth Wolf Creek (Slippery Rock Creek tributary) (the United States)

Location
- Country: United States
- State: Pennsylvania
- Counties: Butler; Mercer

Physical characteristics
- Source: Pine Swamp at the divide between Neshannock Creek, Slippery Rock Creek, and French Creek
  - location: Filers Corners, Pennsylvania
  - coordinates: 41°17′43″N 080°05′12″W
  - elevation: 1,360 ft (410 m)
- Mouth: Slippery Rock Creek
  - location: Moores Corners, Pennsylvania
  - coordinates: 41°02′28″N 080°06′06″W
  - elevation: 1,100 ft (340 m)
- Length: 24.74 mi (39.82 km)
- Basin size: 102.86 square miles (266.4 km^{2})
- Discharge
  - location: Slippery Rock Creek
  - average: 145.08 cu ft/s (4.108 m^{3}/s) at mouth with Slippery Rock Creek

Basin features
- Progression: Slippery Rock Creek → Connoquenessing Creek → Beaver River → Ohio River → Mississippi River → Gulf of Mexico
- River system: Beaver River
- Tributaries
  - left: East Branch; Swamp Run
  - right: Yellow Creek; Barmore Run; Black Run
- Bridges: Jackson Center-Polk Road (PA 965), Sandy Lake-Grove City Road, Creek Road, Kilgore Road, Millbrook Road, Creek Road, Scrubgrass Road, Montgomery Dam Road, E Gilmore Road, I-80, North Street, Lincoln Avenue, E Main Street, Airport Road, Courtney Mill Road, Forrester Road, Mercer Road, Miller Road, New Castle Road (PA 108)

Wolf Creek is a 24.74 mi (39.82 km) long tributary to Slippery Rock Creek that rises from Pine Swamp in Mercer County and flows south to Butler County, Pennsylvania. Wolf Creek drains the Borough of Grove City, Pennsylvania.

== See also ==
- List of rivers of Pennsylvania
