= Cherry Township, Butler County, Pennsylvania =

Township in Pennsylvania, US

Coordinates: 41°03′46″N 79°55′18″W

- Township
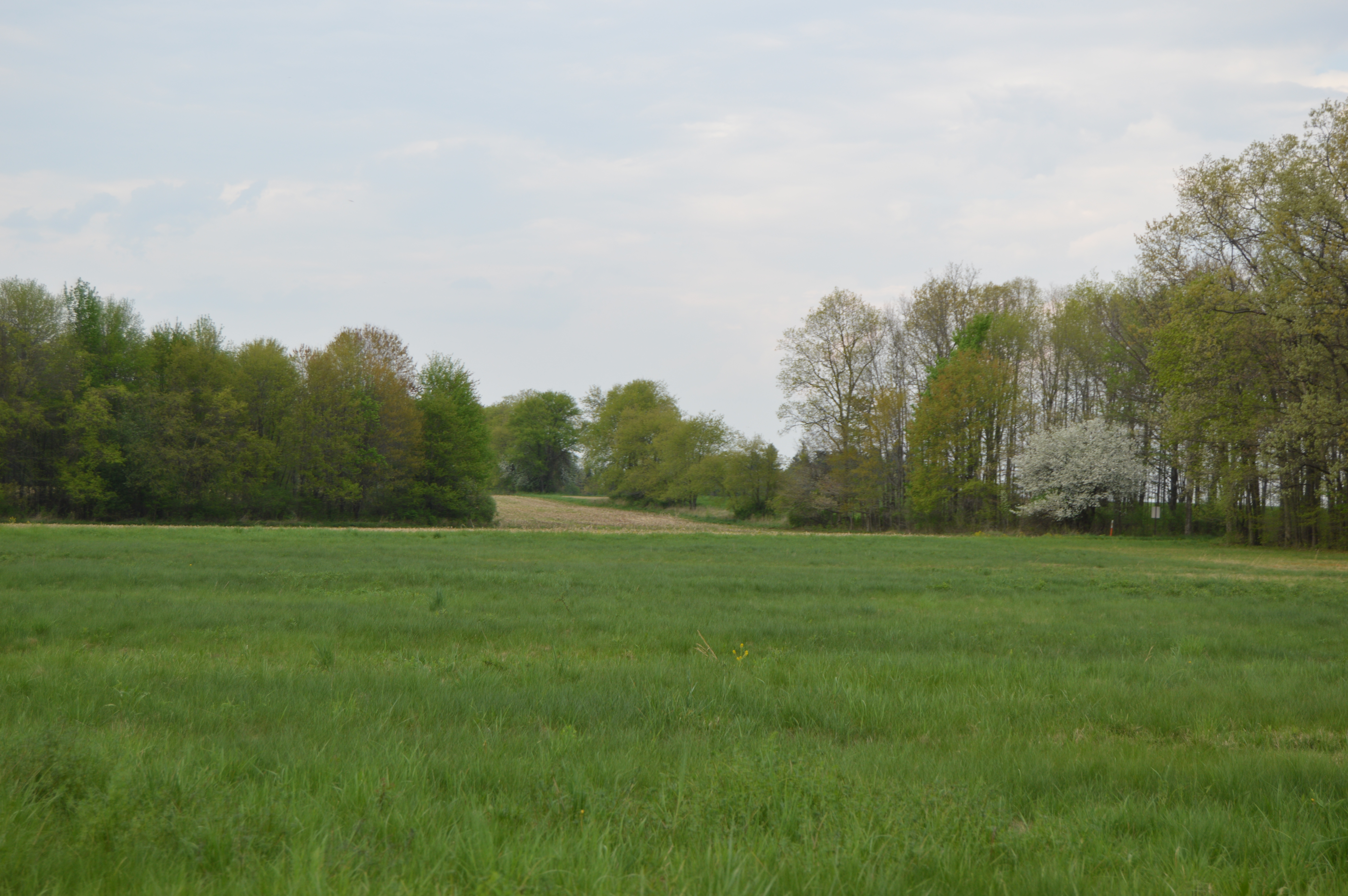
- Fields northwest of West Sunbury

- Logo

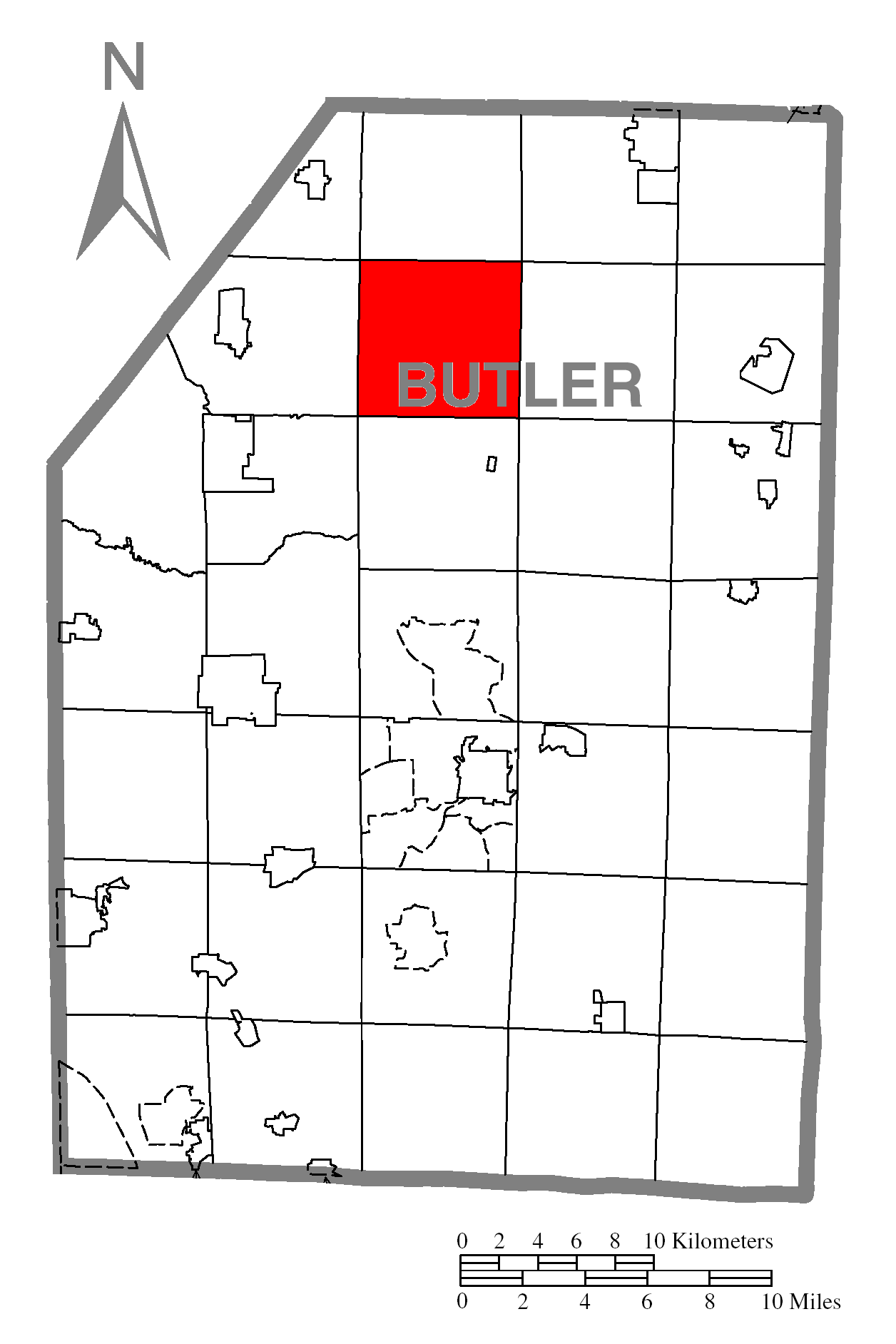
- Map of Butler County, Pennsylvania, highlighting Cherry Township

- Map of Butler County, Pennsylvania
- Country: United States
- State: Pennsylvania
- County: Butler
- Settled: 1797
- Incorporated: 1854

Area
  - Total: 25.89 sq mi (67.05 km^{2})
  - Land: 25.62 sq mi (66.35 km^{2})
  - Water: 0.27 sq mi (0.70 km^{2})

Population (2020)
  - Total: 1,052 ▼
  - Estimate (2022): 1,044
  - Density: 42.3/sq mi (16.34/km^{2})
- Time zone: UTC-5 (Eastern (EST))
  - Summer (DST): UTC-4 (EDT)
- FIPS code: 42-019-12992
- Website: cherrytownship.com

Cherry Township is a township in Butler County, Pennsylvania, United States. The population was 1,106 at the 2010 census.

== Geography ==
Cherry Township is located in northern Butler County and contains the unincorporated communities of Coaltown, Five Points, Moniteau, Bovard, and Annandale. Slippery Rock Creek flows through the northwestern part of the township.

According to the United States Census Bureau, the township has a total area of 25.9 square miles (67.0 km^{2}), of which 25.6 square miles (66.4 km^{2}) is land and 0.27 square miles (0.7 km^{2}), or 1.04%, is water.

== Demographics ==
Historical population
Census	Pop.	Note	%±
2010	1,106		—
2020	1,052		−4.9%
2022 (est.)	1,044		−0.8%

As of the 2000 census, there were 1,053 people, 383 households, and 294 families living in the township. The population density was 40.7 inhabitants per square mile (15.7/km^{2}). There were 412 housing units at an average density of 15.9/sq mi (6.1/km^{2}). The racial makeup of the township was 98.1% White, 0.5% African American, 0.1% Native American, 0.2% Asian, 0.3% Pacific Islander, and 0.4% from two or more races. Hispanic or Latino of any race were 0.6% of the population.

There were 383 households, out of which 33.7% had children under the age of 18 living with them, 64.0% were married couples living together, 6.5% had a female householder with no husband present, and 23.2% were non-families. 17.8% of all households were made up of individuals, and 6.3% had someone living alone who was 65 years of age or older. The average household size was 2.69 and the average family size was 3.05.

In the township the population was spread out, with 25.7% under the age of 18, 5.3% from 18 to 24, 33.2% from 25 to 44, 25.4% from 45 to 64, and 10.4% who were 65 years of age or older. The median age was 37 years. For every 100 females there were 109.8 males. For every 100 females age 18 and over, there were 110.2 males.

The median income for a household in the township was $36,615, and the median income for a family was $41,000. Males had a median income of $33,750 versus $21,731 for females. The per capita income for the township was $14,288. About 8.0% of families and 10.4% of the population were below the poverty line, including 7.7% of those under age 18 and 12.0% of those age 65 or over.
