= Marion Township, Butler County, Pennsylvania =

Township in Pennsylvania, US

Coordinates: 41°07′55″N 79°55′56″W

- Township
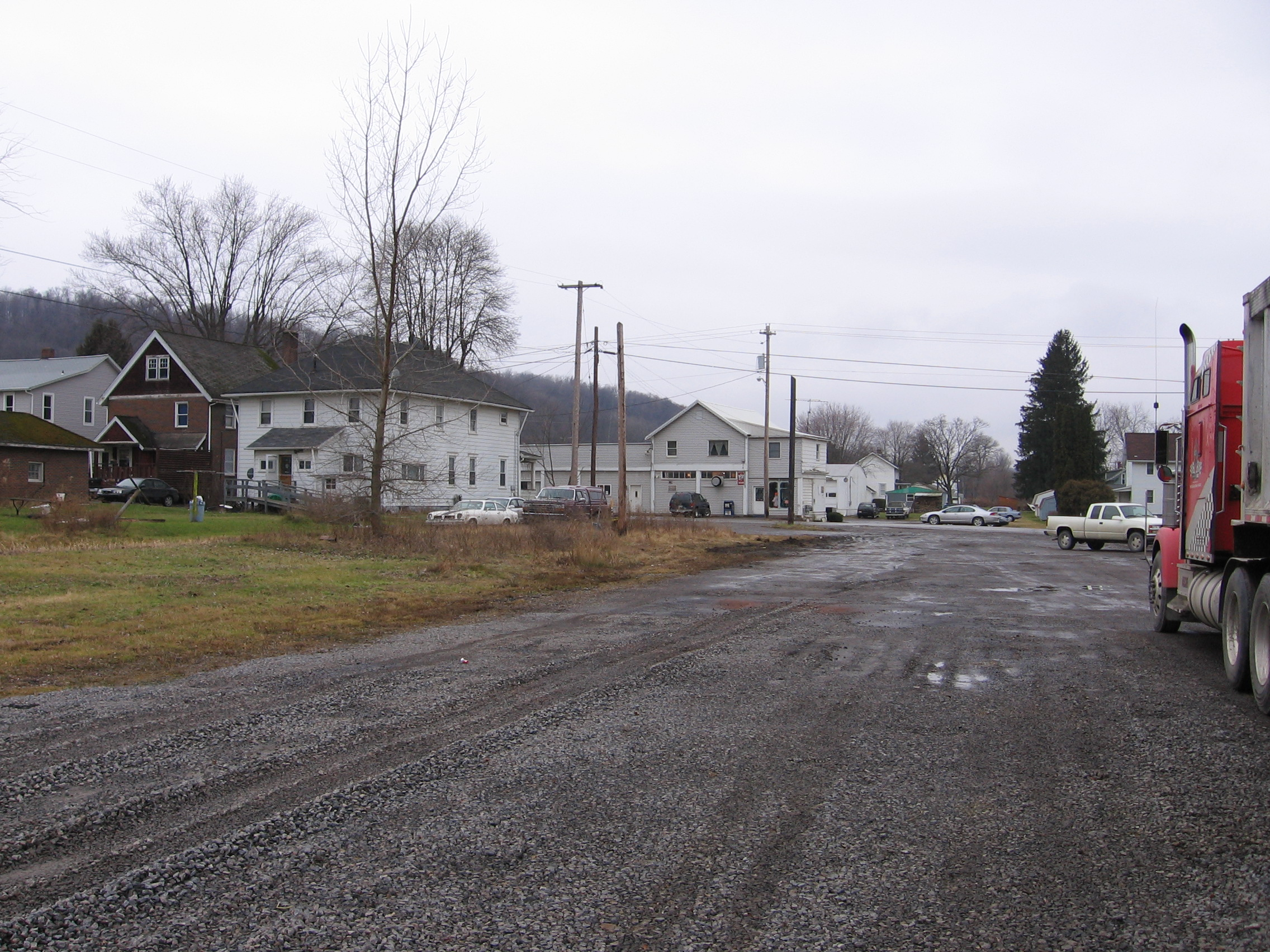
- Houses in Boyers

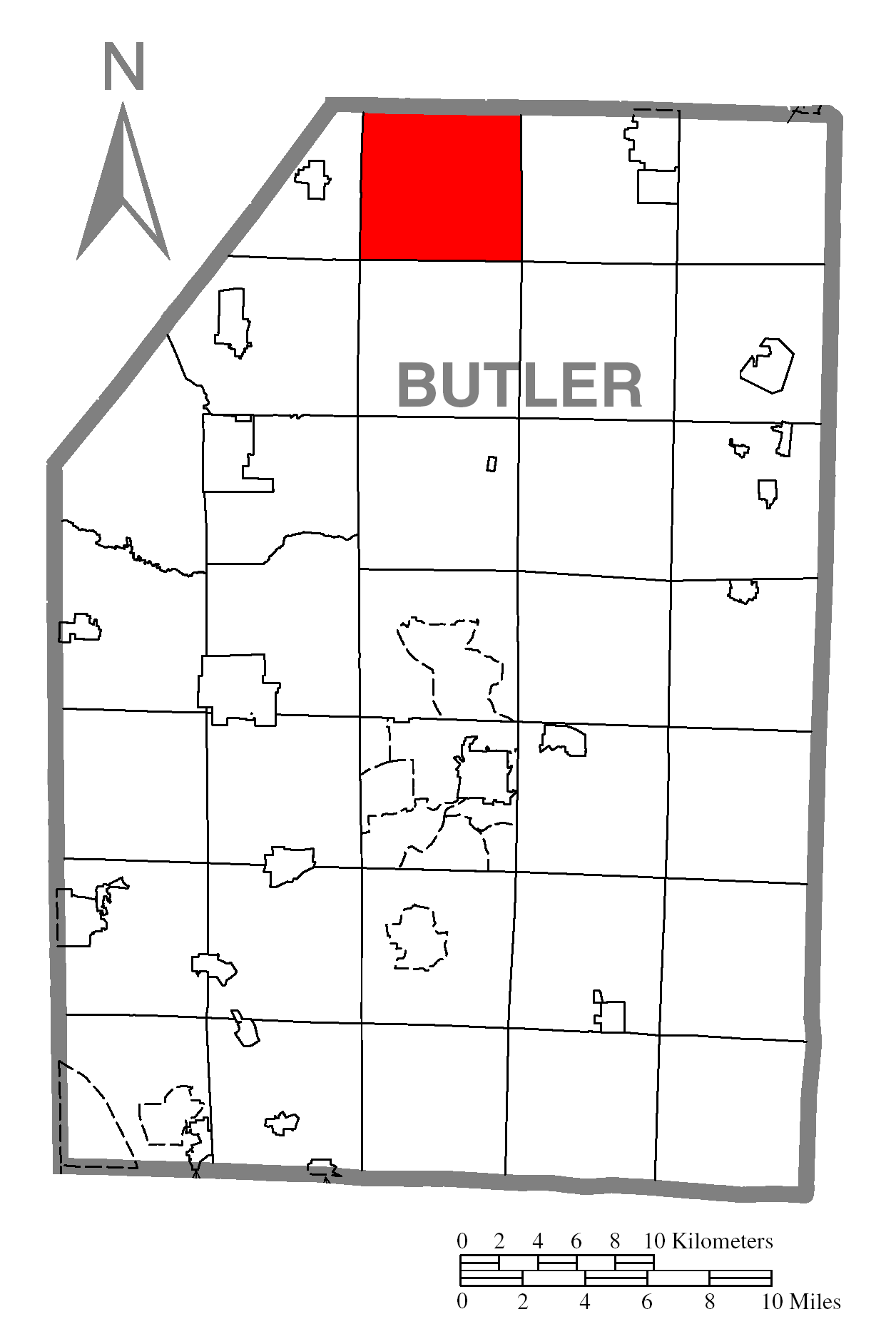
- Map of Butler County, Pennsylvania, highlighting Marion Township

- Map of Butler County, Pennsylvania
- Country: United States
- State: Pennsylvania
- County: Butler
- Settled: 1800
- Incorporated: 1854

Area
  - Total: 25.44 sq mi (65.88 km^{2})
  - Land: 25.44 sq mi (65.88 km^{2})
  - Water: 0 sq mi (0.00 km^{2})

Population (2020)
  - Total: 1,150
  - Estimate (2022): 1,199
  - Density: 47/sq mi (18.2/km^{2})
- Time zone: UTC-5 (Eastern (EST))
  - Summer (DST): UTC-4 (EDT)
- FIPS code: 42-019-47448
- Website: mariontwp.com

Marion Township is a township in Butler County, Pennsylvania, United States. The population was 1,150 at the 2020 census.

== Geography ==
Marion Township is located along the northern border of Butler County, with Venango County to the north. The unincorporated community of Boyers is in the southeastern part of the township. Slippery Rock Creek flows through the southeast part of the township past Boyers. Murrinsville is near the eastern border of the township.

According to the United States Census Bureau, the township has a total area of 25.4 square miles (65.9 km^{2}), all land.

== Demographics ==
Historical population
Census	Pop.	Note	%±
2010	1,239		—
2020	1,150		−7.2%
2022 (est.)	1,126		−2.1%
U.S. Decennial Census

As of the 2000 census, there were 1,330 people, 496 households, and 366 families living in the township. The population density was 52.2 inhabitants per square mile (20.2/km^{2}). There were 550 housing units at an average density of 21.6/sq mi (8.3/km^{2}). The racial makeup of the township was 98.50% White, 0.60% African American, 0.23% Native American, 0.08% Asian, 0.30% Pacific Islander, and 0.30% from two or more races. Hispanic or Latino of any race were 0.23% of the population.

There were 496 households, out of which 31.5% had children under the age of 18 living with them, 60.5% were married couples living together, 9.1% had a female householder with no husband present, and 26.2% were non-families. 21.2% of all households were made up of individuals, and 9.1% had someone living alone who was 65 years of age or older. The average household size was 2.68 and the average family size was 3.12.

In the township the population was spread out, with 25.0% under the age of 18, 7.1% from 18 to 24, 32.8% from 25 to 44, 23.1% from 45 to 64, and 12.0% who were 65 years of age or older. The median age was 36 years. For every 100 females there were 100.9 males. For every 100 females age 18 and over, there were 102.2 males.

The median income for a household in the township was $35,288, and the median income for a family was $41,719. Males had a median income of $30,956 versus $22,083 for females. The per capita income for the township was $15,089. About 10.3% of families and 14.1% of the population were below the poverty line, including 19.4% of those under age 18 and 11.5% of those age 65 or over.
