= Slippery Rock Creek =

- Shoreline view looking upstream from McConnell's Mill

- Location of Slippery Rock Creek mouth Slippery Rock Creek (the United States)

Location
- Country: United States of America
- State: Pennsylvania
- County: Butler; Lawrence
- Cities: Slippery Rock, Ellwood City

Physical characteristics
- Source
  - location: Hilliards, Butler County, Pennsylvania
  - coordinates: 41°06′51″N 79°48′15″W
  - elevation: 1,400 ft (430 m)
- Mouth: Connoquenessing Creek
  - location: Ellwood City, Beaver County, Pennsylvania
  - coordinates: 40°51′31″N 80°15′24″W
  - elevation: 810 ft (250 m)
- Length: 50.17 mi (80.74 km)
- Basin size: 409.79 square miles (1,061.4 km^{2})
- Discharge
  - average: 611.19 cu ft/s (17.307 m^{3}/s) at mouth with Connoquenessing Creek

Basin features
- Progression: Connoquenessing Creek → Beaver River → Ohio River → Mississippi River → Gulf of Mexico
- River system: Beaver River
- Tributaries
  - left: South Branch; Glade Run; Big Run; Hogue Run; Black Run; Muddy Creek; Cheeseman Run; Grindstone Run
  - right: Seaton Creek; Blacks Creek; North Branch; McMurray Run; McDonald Run; Long Run; Wolf Creek; Jamison Run; Taylor Run; Hell Run; Skunk Run

Slippery Rock Creek is a stream in western Pennsylvania, a tributary of Connoquenessing Creek.

== Course and history ==
From its source in Hilliards in Butler County, it flows through McConnells Mill State Park before flowing into the Connoquenessing in Ellwood City. Then, the Connoquenessing flows into the Beaver River just three miles south from the mouth of Slippery Rock.

There are multiple stories about the origin of the creek's name. In one story, the indigenous Seneca Indians called the creek Wechachapohka or "Slippery Rock", denoting the rocks at the bottom of the stream that could be easily crossed by natives wearing moccasins but not by soldiers wearing heavy boots. In another more prosaic story, the Native Americans coined the name due to natural oil seeps in and around the present-day McConnells Mill State Park that made the rocks slippery; those seeps were later eliminated by fossil fuel extraction.

== Recreation ==
Slippery Rock Creek is a favorite for whitewater kayakers and canoeists from the region. With Class-II and -III rapids and engaging beauty, it attracts regular paddlers from novice to advanced level. Slippery Rock Creek, however, can be very dangerous. The rocks are indeed deceptively slippery, and throughout the year, there are numerous reports of drowning incidents, mostly near the McConnells Mill State Park. In and around that state park, the creek formed a rugged gorge that is popular with hikers, and the Slippery Rock Gorge Trail along the creek and its Hell Run tributary has been named as one of the best hiking trails in Pennsylvania.

== Watershed ==
=== Tributaries ===
Tributaries of Slippery Rock Creek

Name, bank	River mile (km)	Watershed area in square miles (km^{2})	Average discharge	Mouth coordinates	Mouth elevation	Source coordinates	Source elevation	Remarks
Mouth		409.79 square miles (1,061.4 km^{2})	611.19 cu ft/s (17.307 m^{3}/s)	40°51′31″N 80°15′24″W	810 ft (250 m)	41°06′51″N 79°48′15″W	1,400 ft (430 m)	Slippery Rock Creek enters Connoquenessing Creek at Wurtemburg, Pennsylvania, in Wayne and Perry townships (Lawrence County).
Skunk Run, right bank	4.42 mi (7.11 km)	1.86 square miles (4.8 km^{2})	2.35 cu ft/s (0.067 m^{3}/s)	40°54′11″N 80°13′31″W	870 ft (270 m)	40°55′21″N 80°15′53″W	1,260 ft (380 m)	Skunk Run enters Slippery Rock Creek in Wayne Township, Lawrence County.
Hell Run, right bank	5.52 mi (8.88 km)	5.78 square miles (15.0 km^{2})	7.24 cu ft/s (0.205 m^{3}/s)	40°54′57″N 80°12′55″W	880 ft (270 m)	40°56′02″N 80°15′48″W	1,220 ft (370 m)	Hell Run enters Slippery Rock Creek in Slippery Rock Township, Lawrence County, Pennsylvania, within McConnells Mill State Park. It is the only Exceptional Value (EV) classified stream in Lawrence County.
Grindstone Run, left bank	6.44 mi (10.36 km)	1.0 square mile (2.6 km^{2})	1.32 cu ft/s (0.037 m^{3}/s)	40°55′13″N 80°12′01″W	920 ft (280 m)	40°54′28″N 80°10′49″W	1,260 ft (380 m)	Grindstone Run enters Slippery Rock Creek in Perry Township, Lawrence County, Pennsylvania, within McConnells Mill State Park.
Cheeseman Run, left bank	8.4 mi (13.5 km)	2.4 square miles (6.2 km^{2})	3.20 cu ft/s (0.091 m^{3}/s)	40°56′19″N 80°10′43″W	940 ft (290 m)	40°55′22″N 80°08′52″W	1,275 ft (389 m)	Cheeseman Run rises in Muddy Creek Township of Butler County and flows west into Perry Township of Lawrence County.
Muddy Creek, left bank	11.82 mi (19.02 km)	80.66 square miles (208.9 km^{2})	80.66 cu ft/s (2.284 m^{3}/s)	40°58′48″N 80°10′46″W	1,040 ft (320 m)	40°59′29″N 79°52′31″W	1,370 ft (420 m)	Muddy Creek rises in western Butler County and flows west into eastern Lawrence County, Pennsylvania. Lake Arthur is a prominent impoundment of this stream. Muddy Creek is the second largest tributary by average discharge.
Taylor Run, right bank	16.66 mi (26.81 km)	12.96 square miles (33.6 km^{2})	17.9 cu ft/s (0.51 m^{3}/s)	41°01′44″N 80°09′28″W	1,075 ft (328 m)	41°07′15″N 80°10′24″W	1,340 ft (410 m)	Taylor Run rises in southwestern Mercer County and flows south to Lawrence County, Pennsylvania, where it joins Slippery Rock Creek.
Jamison Run, right bank	18.06 mi (29.06 km)	12.76 square miles (33.0 km^{2})	18.01 cu ft/s (0.510 m^{3}/s)	41°01′58″N 80°08′26″W	1,085 ft (331 m)	41°06′34″N 80°09′28″W	1,250 ft (380 m)	Jamison Run rises in Lawrence County, Pennsylvania, and flows south into Slippery Rock Creek.
Black Run, left bank	18.90 mi (30.42 km)	7.67 square miles (19.9 km^{2})	10.83 cu ft/s (0.307 m^{3}/s)	41°01′29″N 80°07′55″W	1,090 ft (330 m)	40°00′26″N 80°04′48″W	1,195 ft (364 m)	Black Run originates in a wetland upstream of Tamarack Lake and then flows northwest to meet Slippery Rock Creek at Elliotts Mills, Pennsylvania.
Wolf Creek, right bank	21.28 mi (34.25 km)	102.86 square miles (266.4 km^{2})	145.08 cu ft/s (4.108 m^{3}/s)	41°02′28″N 80°06′06″W	1,100 ft (340 m)	41°17′43″N 80°05′12″W	1,360 ft (410 m)	Wolf Creek originates in Pine Swamp in Mercer County and then flows south to meet Slippery Rock Creek at Moores Corners, Pennsylvania. Wolf Creek is the largest tributary by average discharge.
Hogue Run, left bank	23.76 mi (38.24 km)	7.41 square miles (19.2 km^{2})	10.70 cu ft/s (0.303 m^{3}/s)	41°01′44″N 80°04′20″W	1,100 ft (340 m)	40°59′04″N 80°05′51″W	1,320 ft (400 m)	Hogue Run rises near Shawood Park, Pennsylvania, and then flows north to meet Slippery Rock Creek near Camp Crestview.
Big Run, left bank	26.94 mi (43.36 km)	7.14 square miles (18.5 km^{2})	10.36 cu ft/s (0.293 m^{3}/s)	41°01′14″N 80°02′07″W	1,130 ft (340 m)	40°59′14″N 79°59′14″W	1,370 ft (420 m)	Big Run rises near Elora, Pennsylvania, and then flows northwest to meet Slippery Rock Creek near Crolls Mills.
Glade Run, left bank	30.32 mi (48.80 km)	7.62 square miles (19.7 km^{2})	11.12 cu ft/s (0.315 m^{3}/s)	41°01′30″N 80°00′50″W	1,148 ft (350 m)	40°59′04″N 79°56′42″W	1,370 ft (420 m)	Glade Run rises near Euclid, Pennsylvania, and then flows northwest to meet Slippery Rock Creek at Slippery Rock Park.
Long Run, right bank	32.40 mi (52.14 km)	3.8 square miles (9.8 km^{2})	5.77 cu ft/s (0.163 m^{3}/s)	41°02′59″N 80°00′15″W	1,150 ft (350 m)	41°06′03″N 80°01′16″W	1,350 ft (410 m)	Long Run rises near Adams Corners, Pennsylvania, and then flows south to meet Slippery Rock Creek at Camp Bucoco.
McDonald Run, right bank	34.78 mi (55.97 km)	4.02 square miles (10.4 km^{2})	6.07 cu ft/s (0.172 m^{3}/s)	41°03′39″N 79°59′16″W	1,160 ft (350 m)	41°06′29″N 80°00′40″W	1,330 ft (410 m)	McDonald Run rises in Forestville, Pennsylvania, and then flows south to meet Slippery Rock Creek south of Branchton.
South Branch Slippery Rock Creek, left bank	35.32 mi (56.84 km)	39.49 square miles (102.3 km^{2})	55.78 cu ft/s (1.580 m^{3}/s)	41°03′33″N 79°58′47″W	1,165 ft (355 m)	40°59′58″N 79°48′58″W	1,320 ft (400 m)	Suth Branch of Slippery Rock Creek rises east of Hooker, Pennsylvania, and then flows northwest to meet Slippery Rock Creek south of Bovard, Pennsylvania.
McMurray Run, right bank	37.58 mi (60.48 km)	13.29 square miles (34.4 km^{2})	19.60 cu ft/s (0.555 m^{3}/s)	41°04′38″N 79°57′55″W	1,175 ft (358 m)	41°09′32″N 80°00′23″W	1,390 ft (420 m)	McMurray Run rises north of Harrisville, Pennsylvania and flows south to meet Slippery Rock Creek at Rock Hill Camp. This run drains most of Harrisville.
North Branch Slippery Rock Creek, right bank	40.74 mi (65.56 km)	16.17 square miles (41.9 km^{2})	24.28 cu ft/s (0.688 m^{3}/s)	41°05′53″N 79°55′49″W	1,180 ft (360 m)	41°11′53″N 79°58′57″W	1,378 ft (420 m)	North Branch Slippery Rock Creek rises in Barkeyville, Pennsylvania, and then flows south to meet Slippery Rock Creek near Atwells Crossing, Pennsylvania.
Blacks Creek, right bank	42.26 mi (68.01 km)	8.75 square miles (22.7 km^{2})	13.42 cu ft/s (0.380 m^{3}/s)	41°06′41″N 79°54′56″W	1,190 ft (360 m)	41°10′33″N 79°55′17″W	1,420 ft (430 m)	Blacks Creek rises south of Nectarine, Pennsylvania, and then flows south to meet Slippery Rock Creek west of Boyers, Pennsylvania.
Seaton Creek, right bank	43.90 mi (70.65 km)	10.42 square miles (27.0 km^{2})	16.16 cu ft/s (0.458 m^{3}/s)	41°06′43″N 79°53′26″W	1,195 ft (364 m)	41°08′05″N 79°48′40″W	1,480 ft (450 m)	Seaton Creek rises west of Eau Claire, Pennsylvania, and then flows southwest to meet Slippery Rock Creek at Boyers, Pennsylvania.

== See also ==
- List of rivers of Pennsylvania
