= Muddy Creek (Slippery Rock Creek tributary) =

Stream in Pennsylvania, USA

Muddy Creek Tributary to Slippery Rock Creek
- Location of Muddy Creek mouth Muddy Creek (Slippery Rock Creek tributary) (the United States)

Location
- Country: United States
- State: Pennsylvania
- Counties: Butler; Lawrence

Physical characteristics
- Source: divide between Muddy Creek and Allegheny River
  - location: about 1 mile southeast of West Sunbury, Pennsylvania
  - coordinates: 40°59′39″N 080°10′46″W
  - elevation: 1,370 ft (420 m)
- Mouth: Slippery Rock Creek
  - location: about 0.5 miles downstream of Kennedy Mill
  - coordinates: 40°58′48″N 079°52′31″W
  - elevation: 1,040 ft (320 m)
- Length: 20.14 mi (32.41 km)
- Basin size: 80.66 square miles (208.9 km^{2})
- Discharge
  - location: Slippery Rock Creek
  - average: 80.66 cu ft/s (2.284 m^{3}/s) at mouth with Slippery Rock Creek

Basin features
- Progression: Slippery Rock Creek → Connoquenessing Creek → Beaver River → Ohio River → Mississippi River → Gulf of Mexico
- River system: Beaver River
- Tributaries
  - left: Swamp Run; Shannon Run; Big Run; Bear Run
  - right: unnamed tributaries
- Waterbodies: Lake Arthur
- Bridges: Vidic Road, W Sunbury Road, N Beaver Dam Road, Shroyer Mill Road, William Flynn Highway (PA 8), PA 528, W Park Road, I-79, Currie Road, Book Road, US 19

Muddy Creek is a tributary of Slippery Rock Creek in Butler and Lawrence Counties in Pennsylvania in the United States. The run is 23.2 miles (37.3 km) long, flows generally west, and its watershed is 58.2 square miles (150.7 km^{2}) in area. Muddy Creek is the main water source for Lake Arthur in Moraine State Park.

== See also ==
- List of rivers of Pennsylvania
