= Connoquenessing Creek =

River in Pennsylvania, United States

- View of the Connoquenessing Creek from Renfrew, Pennsylvania

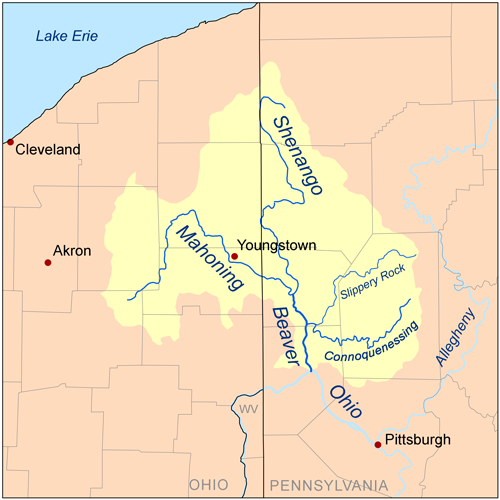

Location
- Country: United States of America
- State: Pennsylvania
- County: Beaver; Butler; Lawrence
- Cities: Butler, PA, Harmony, PA, Zelienople, PA, Ellwood City, PA

Physical characteristics
- Source: Oneida Lake and Dam
  - location: Butler County, Pennsylvania
  - coordinates: 40°59′32″N 79°52′11″W
- Mouth: Beaver River
  - location: Ellwood City, Beaver County, Pennsylvania
  - coordinates: 40°51′13″N 80°19′13″W
  - elevation: 735 ft (224 m)
- Length: 57.76 mi (92.96 km)
- Basin size: 839.79 square miles (2,175.0 km^{2})
- Discharge
  - location: Beaver River
  - average: 1,123.10 cu ft/s (31.803 m^{3}/s) at mouth with Beaver River

Basin features
- Progression: Beaver River → Ohio River → Mississippi River → Gulf of Mexico
- River system: Beaver River
- Tributaries
  - left: Bonnie Brook, Thorn Creek, Glade Run, Breakneck Creek, Brush Creek
  - right: Sullivan Run, Little Connoquenessing Creek, Scholars Run, Camp Run, Slippery Rock Creek

Connoquenessing Creek is a tributary of the Beaver River, approximately 50 mi (80 km) long, in Western Pennsylvania in the United States.

== Course ==
Connoquenessing Creek rises in eastern Butler County and flows southwest, through the Lake Oneida reservoir and past Butler, then west-northwest in a meandering course past Eidenau where Breakneck Creek is received, and then continuing past Harmony and Zelienople. It receives Slippery Rock Creek from the northwest near Ellwood City, then joins the Beaver west of Ellwood City, approximately 3 mi (5 km) further downstream.

== Watershed ==
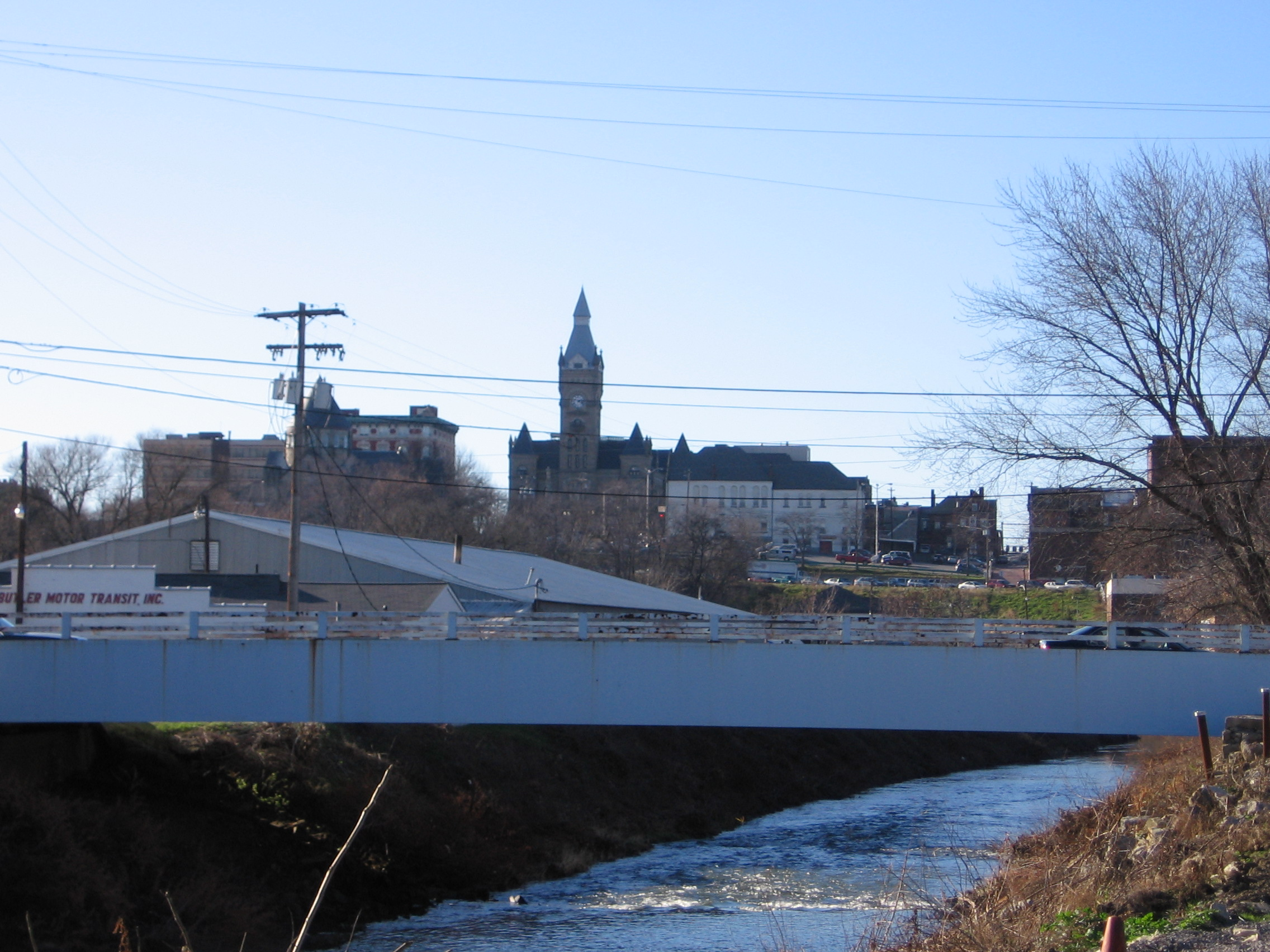
Connoquenessing Creek in Butler, Pennsylvania

In 2000, a scientific study was conducted to determine the health of the creek. Researchers discovered that only the Mississippi River received more toxic materials than the Connoquenessing, making the small river the second most polluted waterway in the United States. "The Armco Inc. steel facility in Butler, purchased last September [1999] by AK Steel, ranked first nationally for the amount of pollutant discharges. The steelmaker legally discharged more than 29 million pounds of nitrate compounds—a waste produced when nitric acid is used to "pickle" or clean the surface of raw steel—into Connoquenessing Creek."

However, as of 2010, the Connoquenessing Creek was not listed in the national Top 10 for polluted waterways. Also, as of 2010, Armco Inc. steel in Butler was not listed in the Top 20 in regards to national pollutant dischargers.

The creek is a popular canoeing and kayaking destination, with many boaters entering the creek at various locations.

== See also ==
- List of rivers of Pennsylvania
- List of most polluted rivers
