= Karns City Area Junior/Senior High School =

High school in Pennsylvania, United States

Coordinates: 40.9878°N 79.7266°W

Location
- 1446 Kittanning Pike; Karns City, PA 16041

Information
- School district: Karns City Area School District
- NCES District ID: 4209600
- Superintendent: Dr. Eric Ritzert
- NCES School ID: 420960001154
- Principal, Grades 7-9: Mrs. Brenda Knoll
- Principal, Grades 10-12: Dr. Michael Stimac
- Teaching staff: 47.10 (FTE)
- Grades: 7-12
- Enrollment: 650 (2023-2024)
- Student to teacher ratio: 13.80
- Colors: Purple and gold
- Nickname: Gremlins
- Website: https://kchs.kcasdk12.org/

Karns City Area Junior/Senior High School is located in Karns City, Pennsylvania. It is part of the Karns City Area School District. The school serves students residing in the Butler County, Clarion County, and Armstrong counties. The boroughs of Chicora, East Brady, Fairview, Karns City, Petrolia, and Bruin, as well as the townships of Parker, Fairview, Donegal, Perry, Sugarcreek, Brady's Bend, and Brady are within Karns City School District boundaries. The principals are Dr. Michael Stimac (Grades 10-12) and Mrs. Brenda Knoll (grades 7-9). The school colors are purple and gold. The school mascot is the Gremlin.
