= Pennsylvania Route 268 =

State highway in Pennsylvania, US

Pennsylvania Route 268

Route information
- Maintained by PennDOT
- Length: 35.126 mi (56.530 km)

Major junctions
- South end: US 422 in West Kittanning
- North end: PA 38 / PA 208 in Emlenton

Location
- Country: United States
- State: Pennsylvania
- Counties: Armstrong, Butler, Venango

Highway system
- Pennsylvania State Route System; Interstate; US; State; Scenic; Legislative
← PA 267	→ PA 270

Pennsylvania Route 268 (PA 268) is a 35-mile-long (56 km) state highway that is located in Armstrong, Butler, and Venango counties in Pennsylvania.

The southern terminus is situated at U.S. Route 422 (US 422) in West Kittanning. The northern terminus is located at PA 38/PA 208 in Emlenton.

== Route description ==
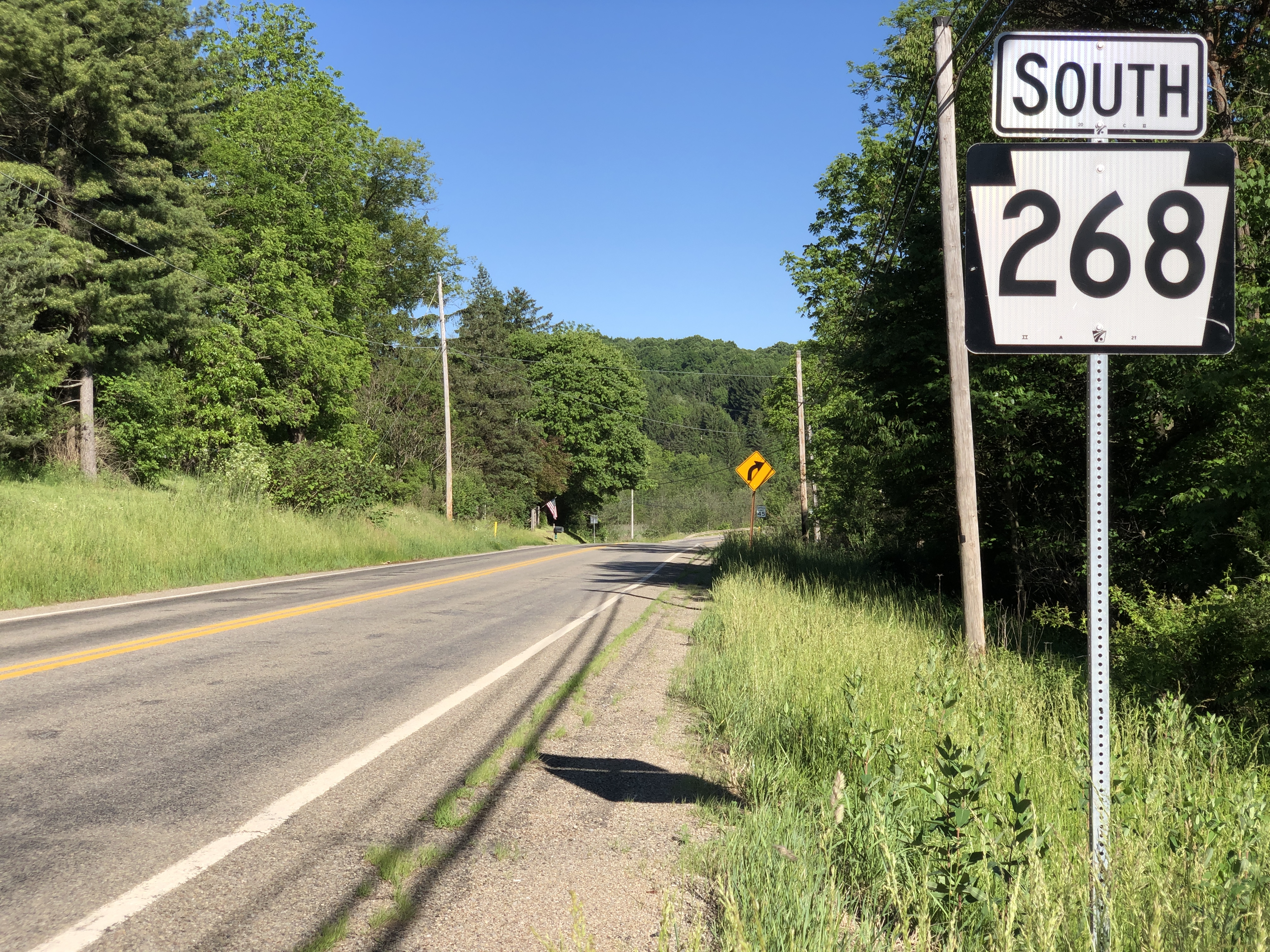
PA 268 southbound in East Franklin Township

PA 268 goes by many names along its route. The names along the route include Kittanning to Butler County Line Road, Kepples Corner Road, Main Street, Jamison Street, Argyle Street, and School Street.

The route starts just outside the borough of West Kittanning at an interchange with US 422. The route goes east into town before turning northwest towards the Armstrong/Butler County line, passing through a few small villages along the way.

The route continues northwest to an intersection with PA 68 outside the town of Chicora. The route then winds north through several boroughs, including Karns City, Petrolia, and Bruin. The route then heads northeast reentering Armstrong County.

The route heads back into Armstrong County, entering the city of Parker, going east for a very short distance before paralleling the Allegheny River for the rest of its route. While still in town, the route intersects with PA 368, where it terminates.

Further north on route, there is another intersection with PA 58 in Hovey Township, across the river from the borough of Foxburg. The route then heads northwest, crossing into Butler County again for a very short distance to the Butler/Venango County line.

The route continues for a very short distance, passing under I-80. The route then terminates in the borough of Emlenton, at an intersection with PA 38/208.

== History ==
The route has, for the most part, stayed on the same roads for its entire existence, with the exception of the southern terminus. The original southern terminus was in the town of West Kittanning with US 422 when that route passed through the town. When the Kittanning bypass was built, the terminus was moved to its current location.

== Major intersections ==
County	Location	mi	km	Destinations	Notes
Armstrong	East Franklin Township	0.0	0.0	US 422 (Benjamin Franklin Highway) to PA 28 – Butler, Indiana, Pittsburgh	Interchange; western end of US 422 Bus. concurrency
Armstrong	West Kittanning	1.2	1.9	US 422 Bus. east (Butler Road) – Kittanning	Eastern end of US 422 Bus. concurrency
Butler	Fairview Township	16.6	26.7	PA 68 – East Brady, Chicora, Butler	
Armstrong	Parker	29.0	46.7	PA 368 east – Callensburg	Western terminus of PA 368
Armstrong	Hovey Township	31.7	51.0	PA 58 – Foxburg, St. Petersburg, Eau Claire	
Venango	Emlenton	35.1	56.5	PA 38 / PA 208 (Emlenton–Clintonville Road / Fifth Street) – Clintonville	
1.000 mi = 1.609 km; 1.000 km = 0.621 mi: Concurrency terminus
