= Fairview Township, Butler County, Pennsylvania =

Township in Pennsylvania, US

Coordinates: 40°58′51″N 79°45′01″W

- Township
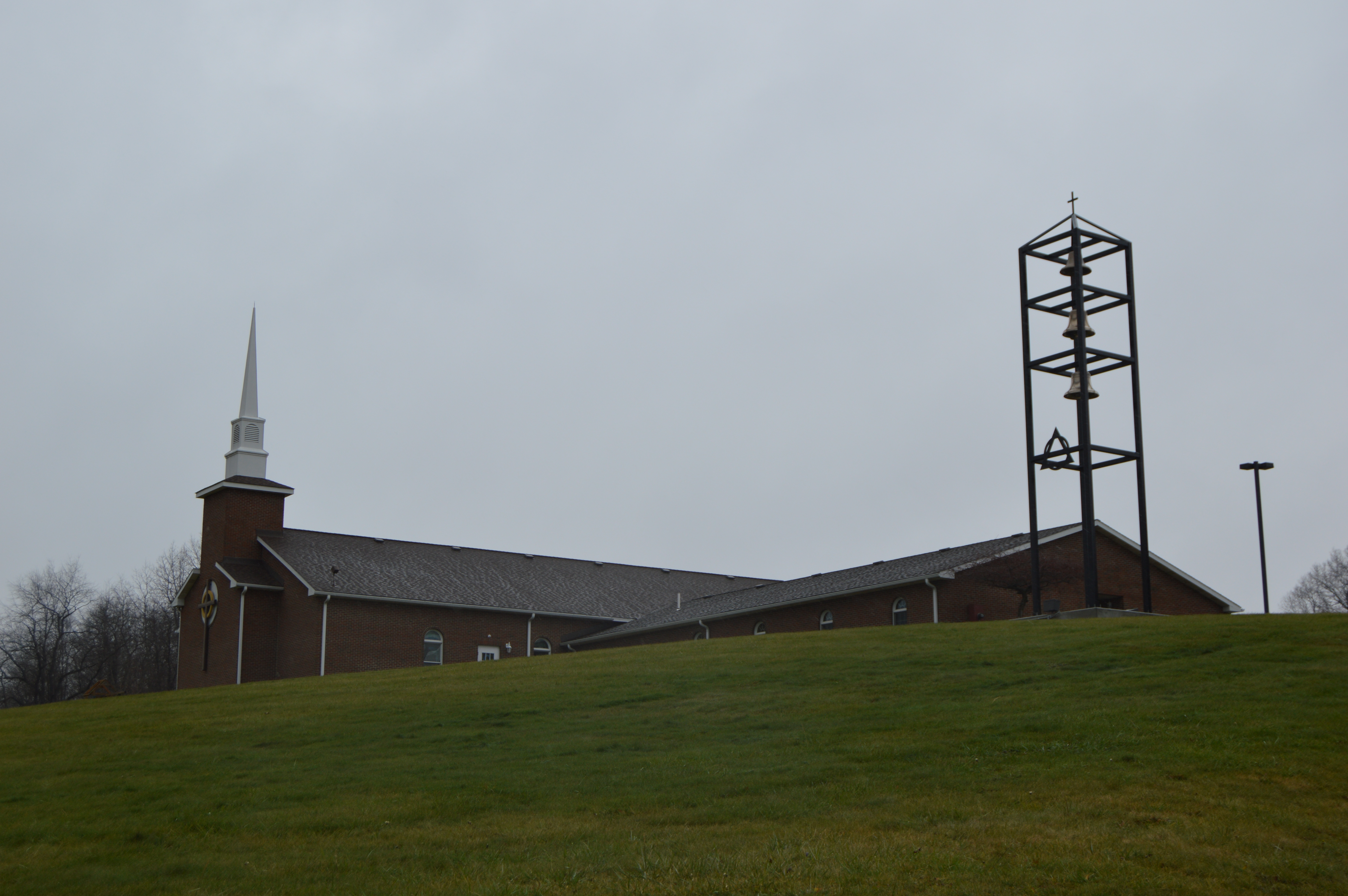
- Holy Trinity Lutheran Church

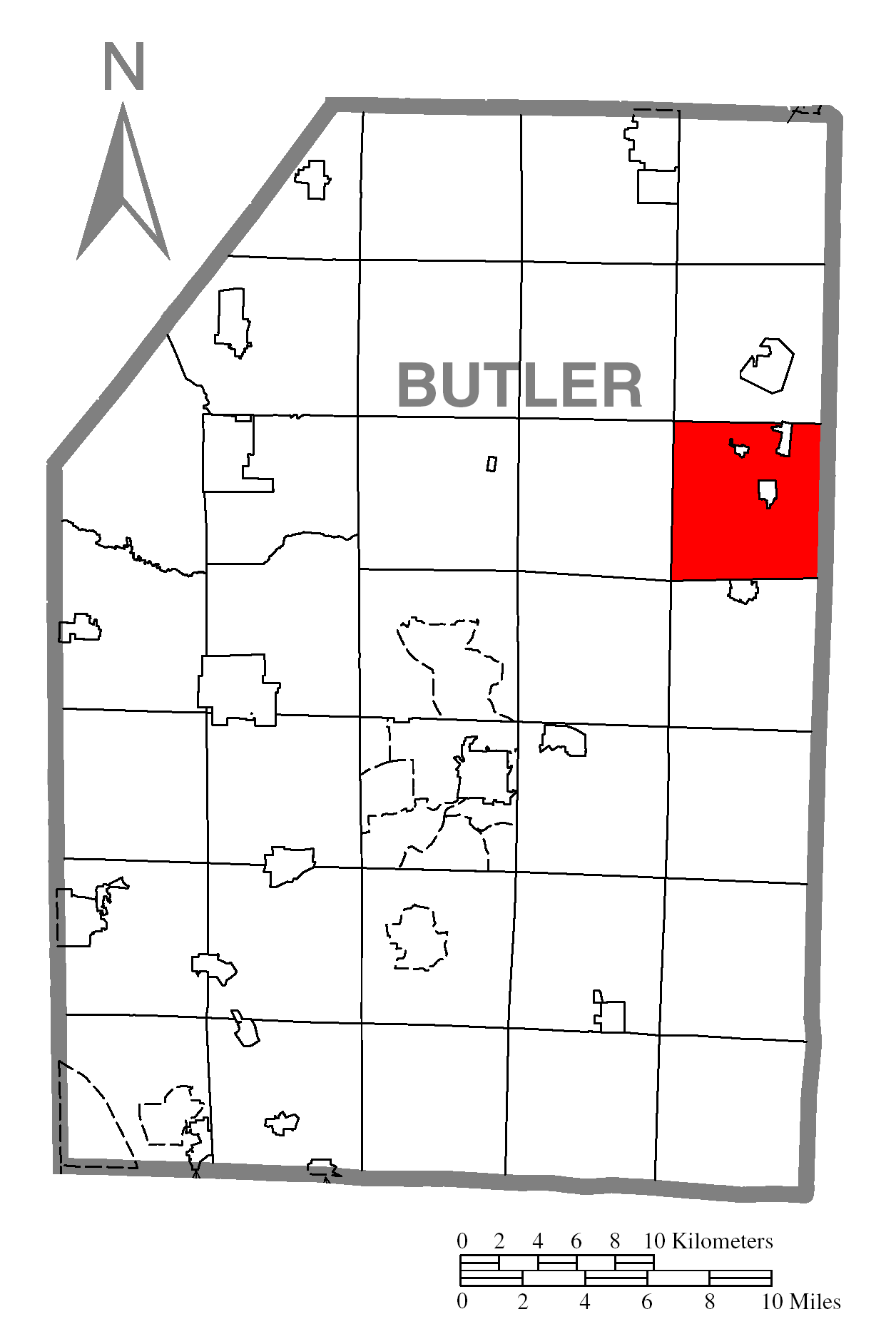
- Map of Butler County, Pennsylvania, highlighting Fairview Township

- Map of Butler County, Pennsylvania
- Country: United States
- State: Pennsylvania
- County: Butler
- Settled: 1795
- Incorporated: 1854

Area
  - Total: 24.21 sq mi (62.71 km^{2})
  - Land: 24.20 sq mi (62.69 km^{2})
  - Water: 0.0077 sq mi (0.02 km^{2})

Population (2020)
  - Total: 1,942 ▼
  - Estimate (2022): 1,920
  - Density: 83.6/sq mi (32.27/km^{2})
- Time zone: UTC-5 (Eastern (EST))
  - Summer (DST): UTC-4 (EDT)
- FIPS code: 42-019-24840

Fairview Township is a township in Butler County, Pennsylvania, United States. The population was 1,942 at the 2020 census.

== Geography ==
Fairview Township is located along the eastern edge of Butler County, with Armstrong County to the east. It surrounds the boroughs of Fairview, Petrolia, and Karns City but is separate from them.

According to the United States Census Bureau, the township has a total area of 24.2 square miles (62.7 km^{2}), of which 0.008 square miles (0.02 km^{2}), or 0.03%, is water.

== Demographics ==
Historical population
Census	Pop.	Note	%±
2010	2,080		—
2020	1,942		−6.6%
2022 (est.)	1,920		−1.1%
U.S. Decennial Census

As of the 2000 census, there were 2,061 people, 744 households, and 578 families living in the township. The population density was 85.6 inhabitants per square mile (33.1/km^{2}). There were 775 housing units at an average density of 32.2 per square mile (12.4/km^{2}). The racial makeup of the township was 99.47% White, 0.19% African American, 0.10% Native American, 0.10% Asian, and 0.15% from two or more races. Hispanic or Latino of any race were 0.19% of the population.

There were 744 households, out of which 36.8% had children under the age of 18 living with them, 67.1% were married couples living together, 7.1% had a female householder with no husband present, and 22.3% were non-families. 18.5% of all households were made up of individuals, and 9.1% had someone living alone who was 65 years of age or older. The average household size was 2.77 and the average family size was 3.18.

In the township the population was spread out, with 26.3% under the age of 18, 7.2% from 18 to 24, 30.5% from 25 to 44, 22.9% from 45 to 64, and 13.1% who were 65 years of age or older. The median age was 37 years. For every 100 females there were 97.6 males. For every 100 females age 18 and over, there were 96.1 males.

The median income for a household in the township was $41,146, and the median income for a family was $47,262. Males had a median income of $36,615 versus $22,222 for females. The per capita income for the township was $16,295. About 8.9% of families and 9.0% of the population were below the poverty line, including 8.8% of those under age 18 and 11.5% of those age 65 or over.

== Education ==
- Karns City Area School District - public school
- Karns City High School
