= Fairview, Butler County, Pennsylvania =

Borough in Pennsylvania, US

Fairview, Pennsylvania
- Borough
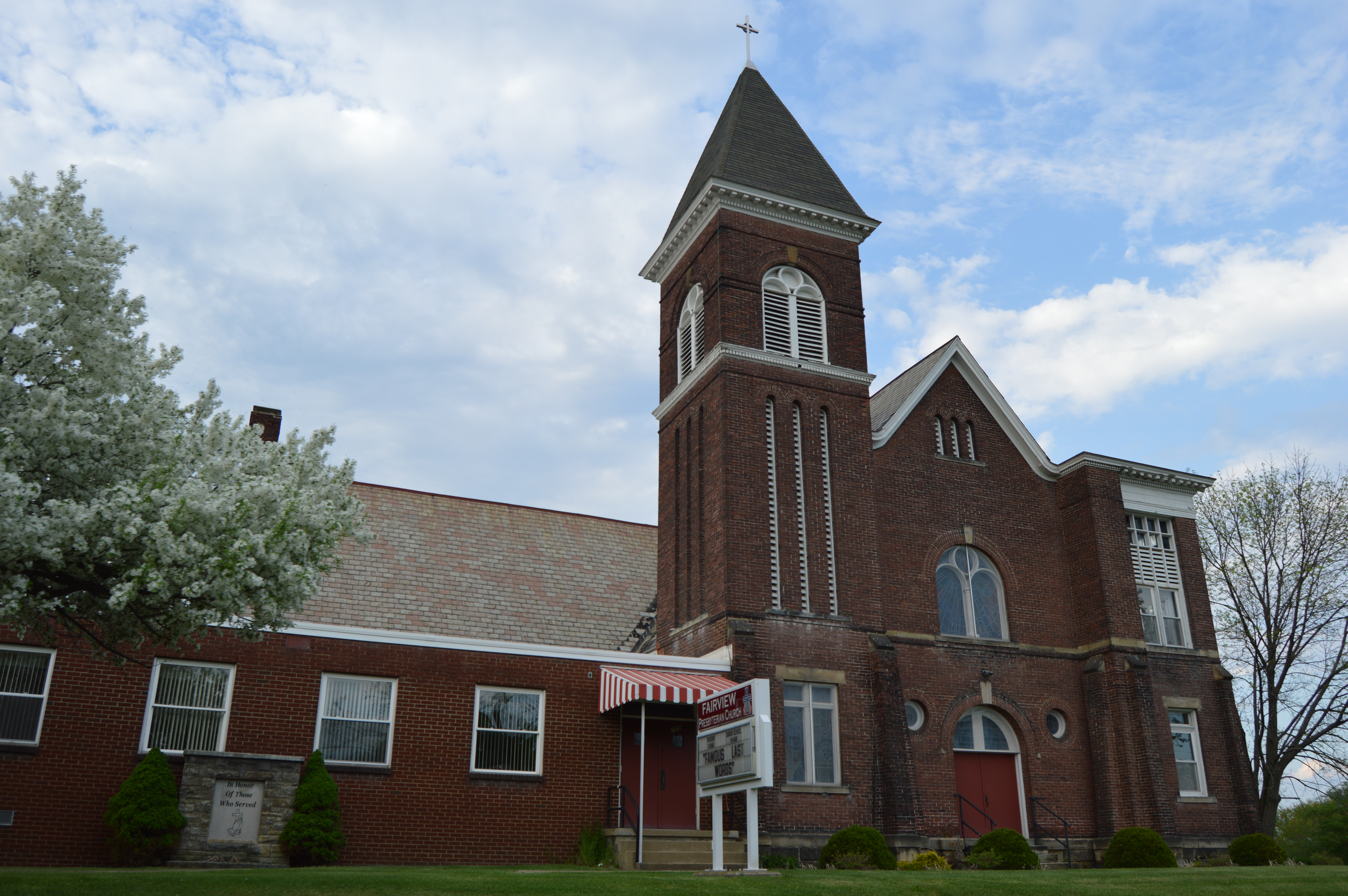
- Fairview Red Brick Church (formerly Fairview Evangelical Presbyterian Church)

- Location of Fairview in Butler County, Pennsylvania.

- Location within Pennsylvania
- Coordinates: 41°00′55″N 79°44′36″W
- Country: United States
- State: Pennsylvania
- County: Butler
- Settled: 1830
- Incorporated: 1867

Government
  - Type: Borough Council

Area
  - Total: 0.11 sq mi (0.29 km^{2})
  - Land: 0.11 sq mi (0.29 km^{2})
  - Water: 0 sq mi (0.00 km^{2})

Population (2020)
  - Total: 180
  - Density: 1,596.2/sq mi (616.29/km^{2})
- Time zone: UTC-5 (Eastern (EST))
  - Summer (DST): UTC-4 (EDT)
- FIPS code: 42-24832
- GNIS feature ID: 1214993

Fairview is a borough in Butler County, Pennsylvania, United States. The population was 198 at the 2010 census. It should not be confused with Fairview in Erie County, which carries the ZIP code 16415.

== Geography ==
Fairview is located in eastern Butler County at 41°0′55″N 79°44′36″W (41.015289, −79.743303). It is surrounded by Fairview Township but is a separate entity. The borough of Petrolia is 1.4 miles (2.3 km) to the east.

According to the United States Census Bureau, Fairview has a total area of 0.12 square miles (0.3 km^{2}), all land.

== History ==
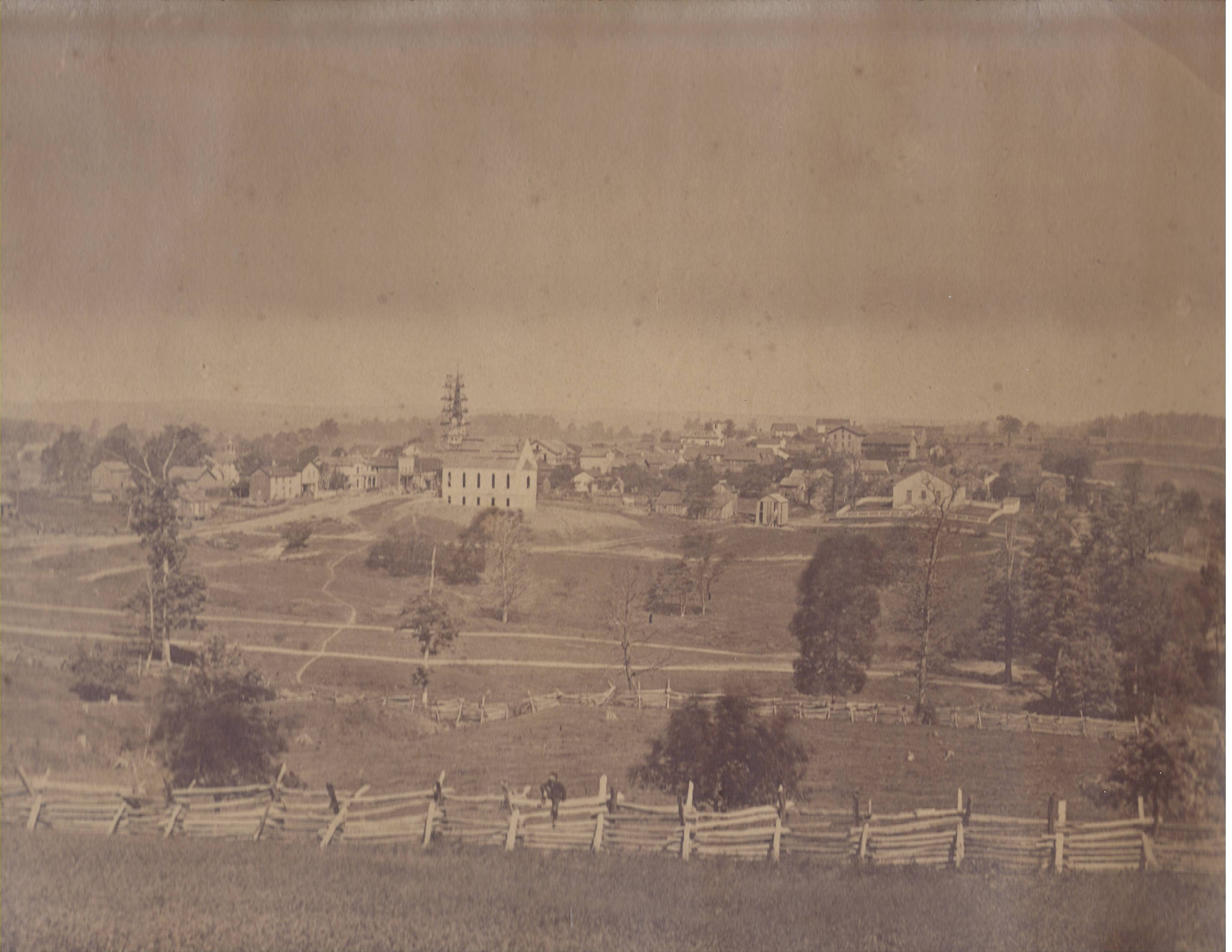
View of Fairview around 1870.

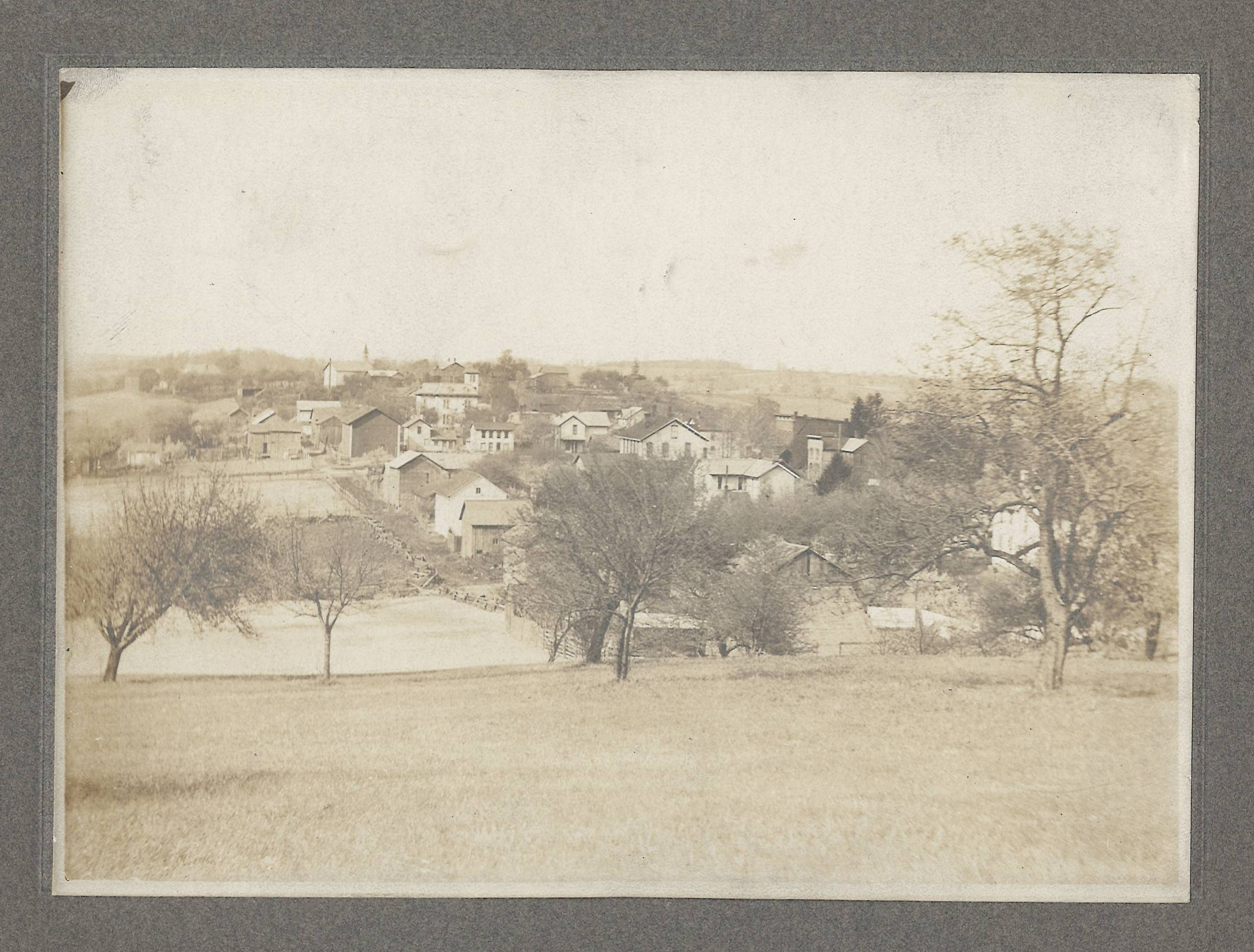
View of Fairview around 1900 looking north.

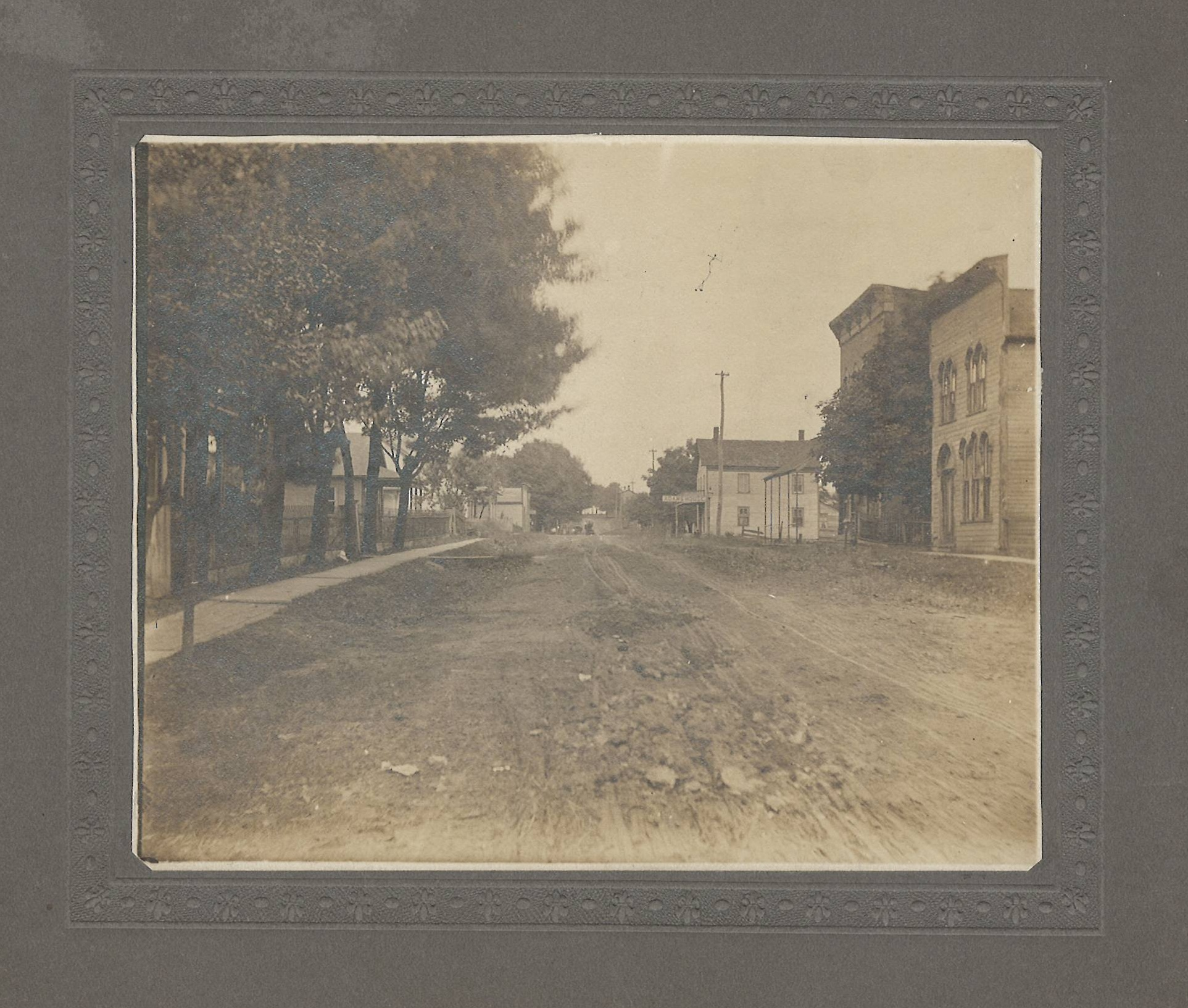
View of Main Street Fairview around 1900.

While early settlers were present in the Fairview area in the late eighteenth century, the streets and lots were laid out in 1830 by William McCleary and Wiliam Hawk. Between the years 1826 and 1839, only 13 houses existed in Fairview. Fairview was first incorporated as a borough in 1867 and chartered in 1874. By 1876, the population had grown to over 1,000 due to the oil boom which occurred in western Pennsylvania after oil was discovered on French Creek near Titusville, Pennsylvania. In 1874, C.D. Angell laid out additional streets and lots to the east of present-day Fairview. Due to a declining population going into the 1880s, Angell's expansion of Fairview was never realized. In 1880, after a series of misfortunes in the oil market, the population dropped to 333. On March 15, 1882, the Ralston and McQuade Bank on Main Street closed its doors with liabilities amounting to around $250,000 (equivalent to 7.5 million dollars today), affecting over 1,000 customers in the general area. A steady population of around 200-300 people have remained in Fairview Borough since the 1880s. Fairview saw a slight rebound after the turbulent 1880s due to the oil refineries located in nearby Petrolia and Karns City Boroughs.

== Demographics ==
As of the 2000 census, there were 220 people, 78 households, and 64 families residing in the borough. The population density was 1,613.5 inhabitants per square mile (623.0/km^{2}). There were 79 housing units at an average density of 579.4 per square mile (223.7/km^{2}). The racial makeup of the borough was 98.64% White, 0.45% African American, 0.45% Native American, and 0.45% from two or more races.

There were 78 households, out of which 38.5% had children under the age of 18 living with them, 66.7% were married couples living together, 7.7% had a female householder with no husband present, and 17.9% were non-families. 14.1% of all households were made up of individuals, and 5.1% had someone living alone who was 65 years of age or older. The average household size was 2.82 and the average family size was 3.02.

In the borough the population was spread out, with 26.4% under the age of 18, 10.0% from 18 to 24, 28.6% from 25 to 44, 23.6% from 45 to 64, and 11.4% who were 65 years of age or older. The median age was 34 years. For every 100 females there were 103.7 males. For every 100 females age 18 and over, there were 92.9 males.

The median income for a household in the borough was $48,125, and the median income for a family was $50,000. Males had a median income of $39,688 versus $20,625 for females. The per capita income for the borough was $17,997. About 5.7% of families and 8.6% of the population were below the poverty line, including 15.9% of those under the age of eighteen and none of those sixty five or over.

Historical population
| Census | Pop. | Note | %± |
|---|---|---|---|
| 1880 | 333 | | — |
| 1890 | 303 | | −9.0% |
| 1900 | 235 | | −22.4% |
| 1910 | 167 | | −28.9% |
| 1920 | 166 | | −0.6% |
| 1930 | 215 | | 29.5% |
| 1940 | 214 | | −0.5% |
| 1950 | 259 | | 21.0% |
| 1960 | 218 | | −15.8% |
| 1970 | 235 | | 7.8% |
| 1980 | 226 | | −3.8% |
| 1990 | 224 | | −0.9% |
| 2000 | 220 | | −1.8% |
| 2010 | 198 | | −10.0% |
| 2020 | 180 | | −9.1% |

== Education ==
- Karns City Area School District - public school
- Karns City High School
- Chicora Elementary School
