= Perry Township, Armstrong County, Pennsylvania =

Township in Pennsylvania, US

Coordinates: 41°01′29″N 79°39′50″W

- Township
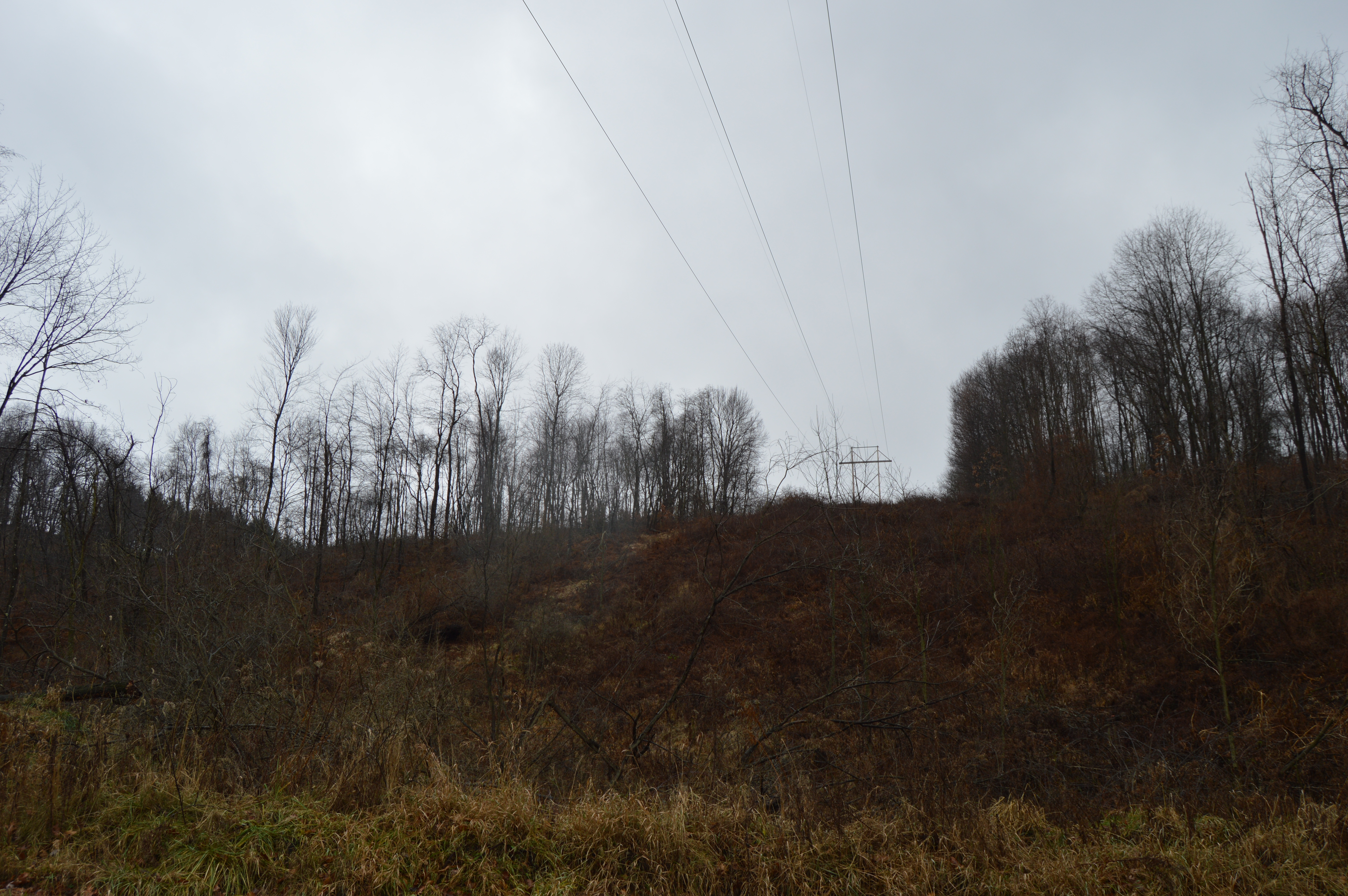
- A small clearing in the township's dense woodlands

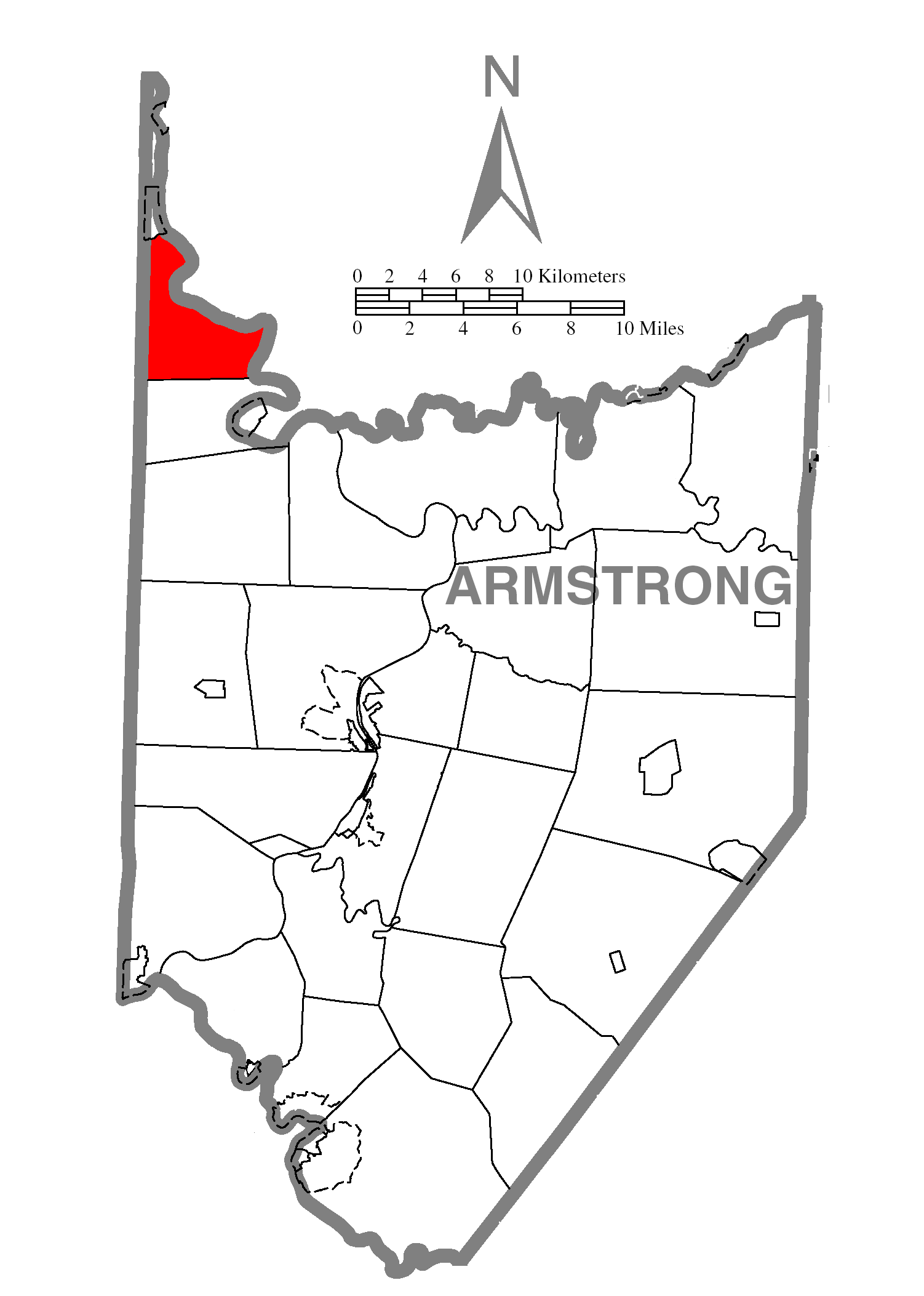
- Map of Armstrong County, Pennsylvania, highlighting Perry Township

- Map of Armstrong County, Pennsylvania
- Country: United States
- State: Pennsylvania
- County: Armstrong
- Settled: 1796
- Incorporated: 1845

Area
  - Total: 15.02 sq mi (38.91 km^{2})
  - Land: 15.02 sq mi (38.91 km^{2})
  - Water: 0 sq mi (0.00 km^{2})

Population (2020)
  - Total: 367
  - Estimate (2021): 365
  - Density: 22.4/sq mi (8.66/km^{2})
- Time zone: UTC-5 (Eastern (EST))
  - Summer (DST): UTC-4 (EDT)
- FIPS code: 42-005-59440

Perry Township is a township that is located in Armstrong County, Pennsylvania, United States. The population was 367 at the time of the 2020 census, an increase over the figure of 352 that was tabulated in 2010.

== History ==
Perry Township appears in the 1876 Atlas of Armstrong County, Pennsylvania.

=== Cemeteries ===
- Crawford Cemetery
- Robinson Cemetery
- Saints Peter and Paul Cemetery
- Shakley Cemetery
- Walley Cemetery

== Geography ==
Perry Township is located in northern Armstrong County, between the west bank of the Allegheny River and the western county boundary. It is bordered to the north by the city of Parker.

According to the United States Census Bureau, the township has a total area of 15.0 square miles (38.9 km^{2}), all land.

== Demographics ==
Historical population
Census	Pop.	Note	%±
2010	352		—
2020	367		4.3%
2021 (est.)	365		−0.5%
U.S. Decennial Census

As of the 2000 census, there were 404 people, 154 households, and 119 families residing in the township.

The population density was 26.9 inhabitants per square mile (10.4/km^{2}). There were 263 housing units at an average density of 17.5/sq mi (6.8/km^{2}).

The racial makeup of the township was 99.75% White, and 0.25% from two or more races. Hispanic or Latino of any race were 0.25% of the population.

There were 154 households, out of which 32.5% had children under the age of eighteen living with them; 64.3% were married couples living together, 9.1% had a female householder with no husband present, and 22.7% were non-families. 19.5% of all households were made up of individuals, and 7.8% had someone living alone who was sixty-five years of age or older.

The average household size was 2.62 and the average family size was 2.92.

The township median age of thirty-nine years was slightly less than the county median age of forty years. The distribution by age group was 24.5% of residents who were under the age of eighteen, 5.4% who were aged eighteen to twenty-four, 30.7% who were aged twenty-five to forty-four, 25.5% who were aged forty-five to sixty-four, and 13.9% who were sixty-five years of age or older.

For every one hundred females, there were 98.0 males. For every one hundred females who were aged eighteen or older, there were 108.9 males.

The median income for a household in the township was $32,083, and the median income for a family was $40,469. Males had a median income of $31,250 compared with that of $26,250 for females.

The per capita income for the township was $22,784.

Approximately 11.1% of families and 11.8% of the population were living below the poverty line, including 11.0% of those who were under the age of eighteen and 3.8% of those who were aged sixty-five or older.

== Education ==
- Karns City Area School District - public schools
- Karns City High School in neighboring Butler County

== Recreation ==
A portion of the Pennsylvania State Game Lands Number 105 is located in Perry Township, at the confluence of Birch Run with the Allegheny River.
