= Donegal Township, Butler County, Pennsylvania =

Township in Pennsylvania, US

Coordinates: 40°55′33″N 79°44′01″W

- Township
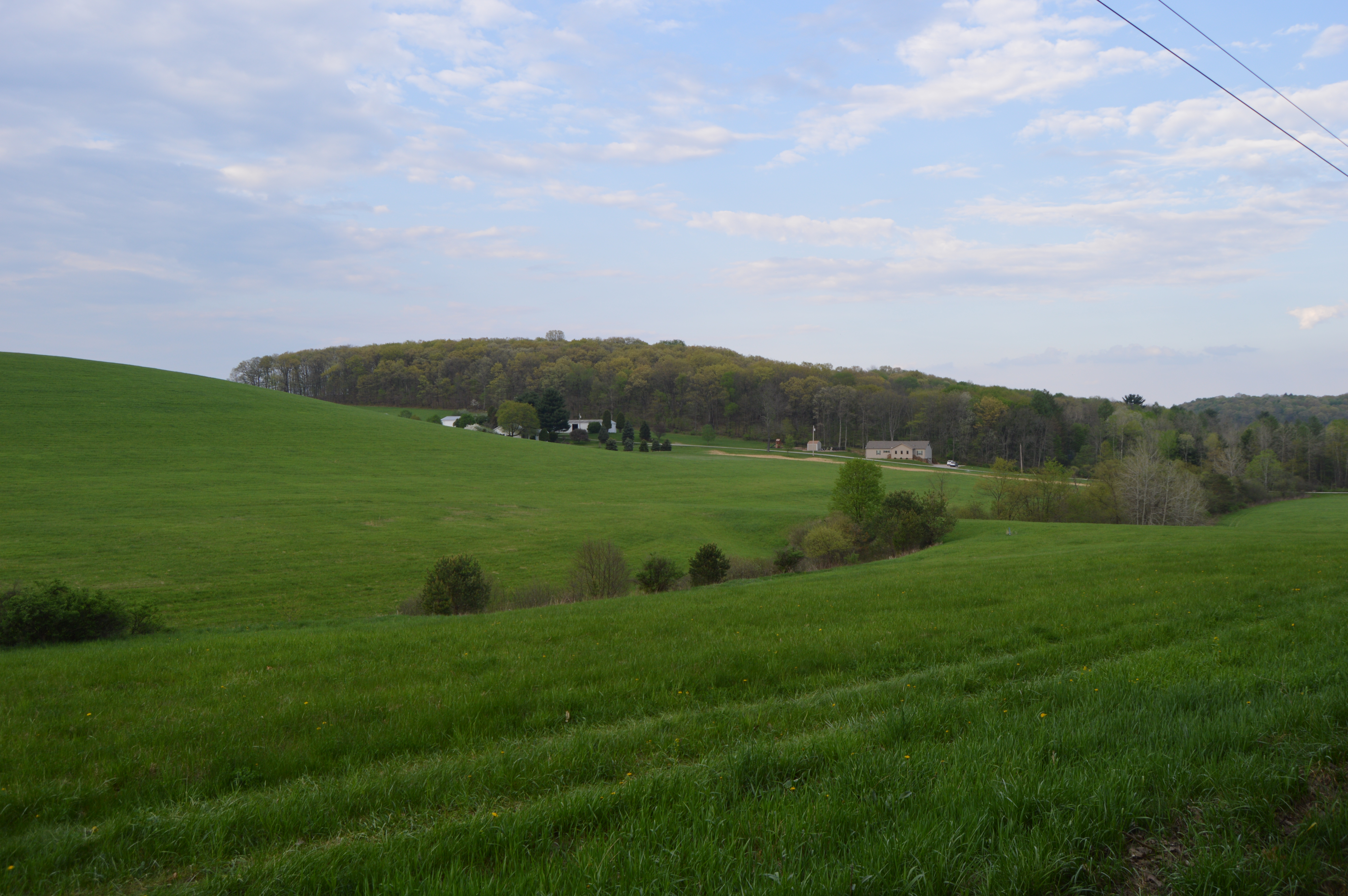
- Fields southwest of Chicora

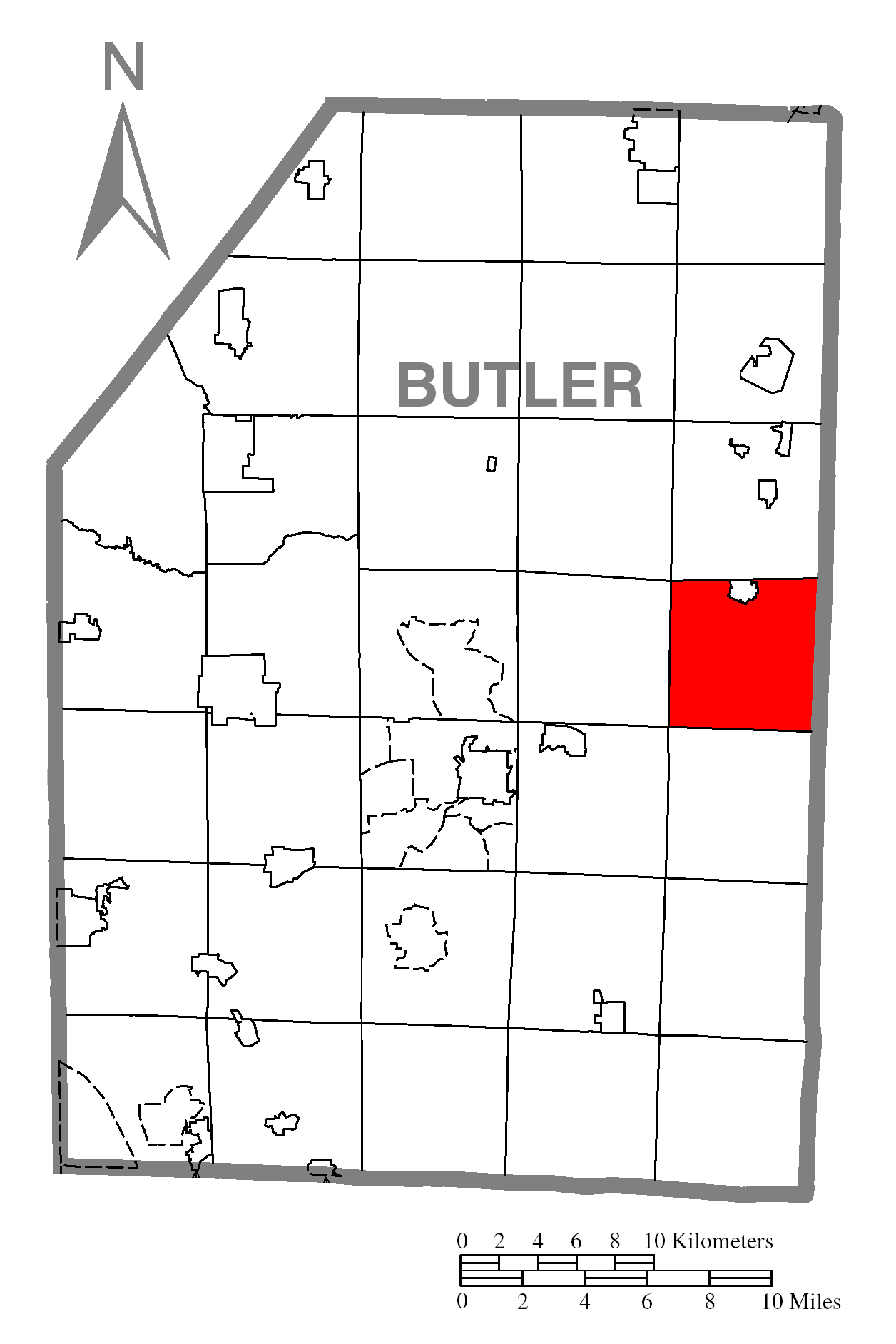
- Map of Butler County, Pennsylvania highlighting Donegal Township

- Map of Butler County, Pennsylvania
- Country: United States
- State: Pennsylvania
- County: Butler
- Settled: 1794
- Incorporated: 1854

Area
  - Total: 23.21 sq mi (60.11 km^{2})
  - Land: 23.19 sq mi (60.07 km^{2})
  - Water: 0.015 sq mi (0.04 km^{2})

Population (2020)
  - Total: 1,821 ▼
  - Estimate (2022): 1,780
  - Density: 78.8/sq mi (30.43/km^{2})
- Time zone: UTC-5 (Eastern (EST))
  - Summer (DST): UTC-4 (EDT)
- FIPS code: 42-019-19456
- Website: donegaltwpbutler.com

Donegal Township is a township in Butler County, Pennsylvania, United States. The population was 1,821 at the 2020 census.

It was named after the town and county of Donegal in Ireland.

== Geography ==
Donegal Township is located along the eastern edge of Butler County, with Armstrong County to the east. The township nearly surrounds the borough of Chicora in the north.

According to the United States Census Bureau, the township has a total area of 23.2 square miles (60.1 km^{2}), of which 0.015 square miles (0.04 km^{2}), or 0.07%, is water.

== Demographics ==
Historical population
Census	Pop.	Note	%±
2010	1,864		—
2020	1,821		−2.3%
2022 (est.)	1,780		−2.3%
U.S. Decennial Census

As of the 2000 census, there were 1,722 people, 598 households, and 452 families residing in the township. The population density was 74.9 inhabitants per square mile (28.9/km^{2}). There were 623 housing units at an average density of 27.1 per square mile (10.5/km^{2}). The racial makeup of the township was 99.36% White, 0.29% African American, 0.06% Native American, 0.06% Asian, 0.06% from other races, and 0.17% from two or more races. Hispanic or Latino of any race were 0.52% of the population.

There were 598 households, out of which 38.1% had children under the age of 18 living with them, 65.6% were married couples living together, 6.7% had a female householder with no husband present, and 24.4% were non-families. 22.6% of all households were made up of individuals, and 10.9% had someone living alone who was 65 years of age or older. The average household size was 2.71 and the average family size was 3.18.

In the township the population was spread out, with 26.2% under the age of 18, 5.9% from 18 to 24, 27.6% from 25 to 44, 22.5% from 45 to 64, and 17.8% who were 65 years of age or older. The median age was 38 years. For every 100 females there were 98.6 males. For every 100 females aged 18 and over, there were 94.5 males.

The median income for a household in the township was $43,355, and the median income for a family was $52,083. Males had a median income of $40,170 versus $22,083 for females. The per capita income for the township was $17,012. About 4.3% of families and 6.0% of the population were below the poverty line, including 8.4% of those under age 18 and 5.9% of those age 65 or over.

== Education ==
- Karns City Area School District - public school
- Karns City High School
