= Branchton, Pennsylvania =

Unincorporated community in Pennsylvania, US

- Unincorporated community
- Location within Pennsylvania
- Coordinates: 41°04′21″N 79°59′08″W
- Country: United States
- State: Pennsylvania
- County: Butler
- Elevation: 1,201 ft (366 m)
- Time zone: UTC-5 (Eastern (EST))
  - Summer (DST): UTC-4 (EDT)
- ZIP code: 16021
- Area codes: 724, 878
- GNIS feature ID: 1170154

Branchton is an unincorporated community in Butler County, Pennsylvania, United States. The community is located near Pennsylvania Route 8, 3.7 miles (6.0 km) east of Slippery Rock. Branchton had a post office until April 23, 2005; it still has its own ZIP code, 16021.
