= Slippery Rock University, Pennsylvania =

Unincorporated community in Pennsylvania, US

Slippery Rock University (CDP), Pennsylvania
- Census-designated place
- Location within Pennsylvania Location within the United States
- Coordinates: 41°03′53″N 80°02′31″W
- Country: United States
- State: Pennsylvania
- County: Butler
- Township: Slippery Rock

Area
  - Total: 0.54 sq mi (1.4 km^{2})
  - Land: 0.54 sq mi (1.4 km^{2})
  - Water: 0 sq mi (0.0 km^{2})
- Elevation: 1,293 ft (394 m)

Population (2010)
  - Total: 1,898
  - Density: 3,448/sq mi (1,331.1/km^{2})
- Time zone: UTC-5 (Eastern (EST))
  - Summer (DST): UTC-4 (EDT)
- GNIS feature ID: 2633670

Slippery Rock University (CDP) is a census-designated place located in Slippery Rock Township, Butler County, in the U.S. state of Pennsylvania. It consists of the portion of Slippery Rock University of Pennsylvania that lies outside the borough of Slippery Rock, and the student residential population makes up the majority of the CDP's population. As of the 2010 census the population was 1,898.

== Demographics ==
Historical population
Census	Pop.	Note	%±
2020	2,397		—
