= Karns City, Pennsylvania =

Borough in Pennsylvania, US

- Borough
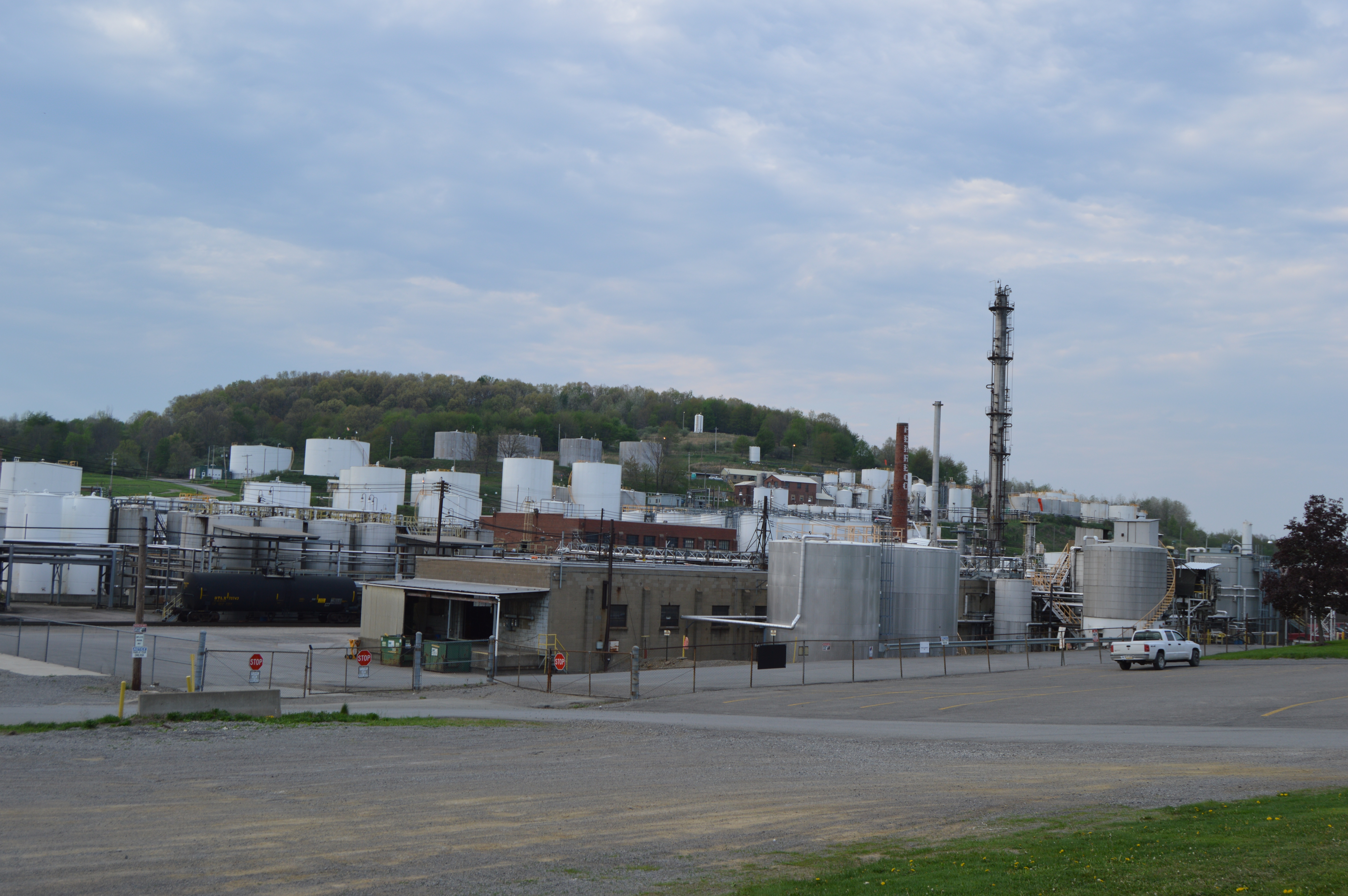
- Calumet Penreco oil refinery on Petrolia Street

- Location of Karns City in Butler County, Pennsylvania.

- Location within Pennsylvania
- Coordinates: 40°59′42″N 79°43′33″W
- Country: United States
- State: Pennsylvania
- County: Butler
- Settled: 1874
- Incorporated: 1875

Government
  - Type: Borough Council

Area
  - Total: 0.36 sq mi (0.94 km^{2})
  - Land: 0.36 sq mi (0.94 km^{2})
  - Water: 0 sq mi (0.00 km^{2})

Population (2020)
  - Total: 175
  - Density: 482.6/sq mi (186.32/km^{2})
- Time zone: UTC-5 (Eastern (EST))
  - Summer (DST): UTC-4 (EDT)
- Zip code: 16041
- FIPS code: 42-38768

Karns City is a borough that is located in Butler County, Pennsylvania, United States. The population was 175 at the time of the 2020 census.

== History ==
In December 1871, Hugh P. McClymonds and Samuel L. Riddle leased fifteen acres of land to two brothers from the Cooper family. Initially slated to be used as farmland, those plans changed when a reserve of oil was discovered on the land. The first oil well, known as "Shasta," was established shortly thereafter near the western line of McClymonds' two hundred and fourteen-acre farm.

On May 29, 1872, S. D. Karns obtained a lease for McClymonds' entire farm with the hope of increasing the well's capacity and profitability. Oil, at that time, was priced at four dollars per barrel. By June, Karns' well was extracting one hundred and twenty barrels of oil from the ground daily. As more speculators became interested in McClymonds' property, however, discord arose between competitors; in response, McClymonds sold the entire property, with the except of its farm buildings and fourteen acres of surface land, for $60,000 on June 18 of that same year to Karns, O. G. Emery, John H. Haines, William Parker, and William Thompson. Additional derricks and supporting buildings were quickly erected and oil extraction ramped up even further.

In short order, the few buildings grew to several and then many, with entrepreneurs adding hotels, livery stables, machine shops, residences, and restaurants to turn the small, rural village into a booming town that soon became known as Karns City. In 1872, Ralston McQuaide & Co. opened a banking office that operated until 1880.

The borough of Karns City, which included all of McClymonds' land and roughly ten acres owned by Riddle, was subsequently incorporated on January 4, 1875.

== Geography ==
Karns City is located in eastern Butler County at 40°59′42″N 79°43′33″W, in the valley of the South Branch of Bear Creek, a tributary of the Allegheny River.

Pennsylvania Route 268 passes through the borough, leading north 1.7 miles (2.7 km) to Petrolia and south 3.7 miles (6.0 km) to Chicora.

According to the United States Census Bureau, Karns City has a total area of 0.36 square miles (0.94 km^{2}), all land.

== Demographics ==
Historical population
Census	Pop.	Note	%±
1880	701		—
1890	427		−39.1%
1900	265		−37.9%
1910	283		6.8%
1920	292		3.2%
1930	432		47.9%
1940	453		4.9%
1950	508		12.1%
1960	404		−20.5%
1970	379		−6.2%
1980	354		−6.6%
1990	226		−36.2%
2000	244		8.0%
2010	209		−14.3%
2020	175		−16.3%

As of the 2000 census, there were 244 people, 89 households, and 67 families residing in the borough.

The population density was 645.8 inhabitants per square mile (249.3/km^{2}). There were 96 housing units at an average density of 254.1 per square mile (98.1/km^{2}).

The racial makeup of the borough was 99.59% White and 0.41% African American. Hispanic or Latino of any race were 0.41% of the population.

There were 89 households, out of which 33.7% had children under the age of eighteen living with them; 62.9% were married couples living together, 7.9% had a female householder with no husband present, and 23.6% were non-families. 16.9% of all households were made up of individuals, and 12.4% had someone living alone who was sixty-five years of age or older.

The average household size was 2.74 and the average family size was 3.10.

Within the borough, the population was spread out, with 26.6% who were under the age of eighteen, 6.6% who were aged eighteen to twenty-four, 28.3% who were aged twenty-five to forty-four, 21.7% who were aged forty-five to sixty-four, and 16.8% who were sixty-five years of age or older. The median age was thirty-six years.

For every one hundred females there were 89.1 males. For every one hundred females who were aged eighteen or older, there were 82.7 males.

The median income for a household in the borough was $32,125, and the median income for a family was $34,375. Males had a median income of $36,750 compared with that of $21,042 for females.

The per capita income for the borough was $15,290.

Approximately 12.5% of families and 16.7% of the population were living below the poverty line, including 22.6% of those who were under the age of eighteen and 13.6% of those who were sixty-five or older.

== Education ==
- Karns City Area School District
- Karns City High School
