= Karns City Area School District =

School district in Pennsylvania, USA

Coordinates: 40.98772°N 79.72600°W

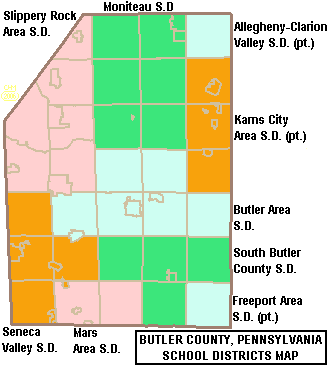
- Map of Butler County Pennsylvania School Districts

Address
- 1446 Kittanning Pike Karns City, Pennsylvania, 16041; United States

District information
- Type: Public
- Grades: K–12
- Superintendent: Dr. Eric Ritzert
- Schools: 2
- NCES District ID: 4209600

Students and staff
- Students: 1,311 (2022-23)
- Teachers: 94.50 (FTE)
- Student–teacher ratio: 13.87
- District mascot: Gremlin
- Colors: Purple, gold, and white

Other information
- Website: www.kcasdk12.org

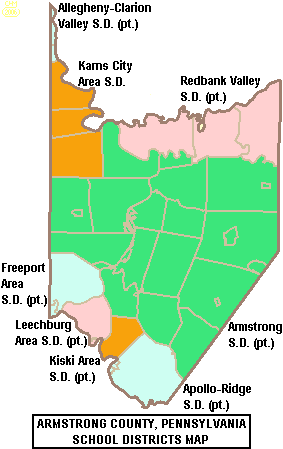
Karns City School District region in Armstrong County

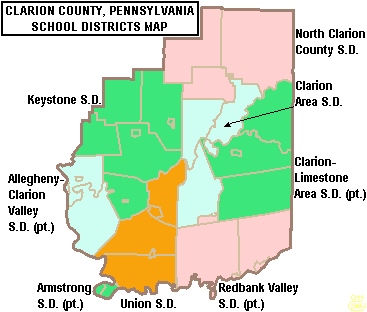
Karns City School District region in Clarion County

Karn City Area School District is a public school district in Butler County, Clarion County, and Armstrong County, Pennsylvania. The district serves the boroughs of Chicora, Fairview, Karns City, Petrolia, and Bruin, and the townships of Parker, Fairview, and Donegal in Butler County, the townships of Perry, Sugarcreek, and Bradys Bend in Armstrong County, and the borough of East Brady and Brady Township in Clarion County. There is one K–6 elementary school- Karns City Area Elementary, as well as Karns City Area Junior/Senior High School. The district encompasses approximately 125 square miles (320 km^{2}). According to 2000 federal census data, it serves a resident population of 10,720.

== Schools ==
- Karns City Area Elementary School (Grades K-6)
- Karns City Area Junior/Senior High School (Grades 7-12)
