= Fernway, Pennsylvania =

Unincorporated community in Pennsylvania, US

- Former census-designated place
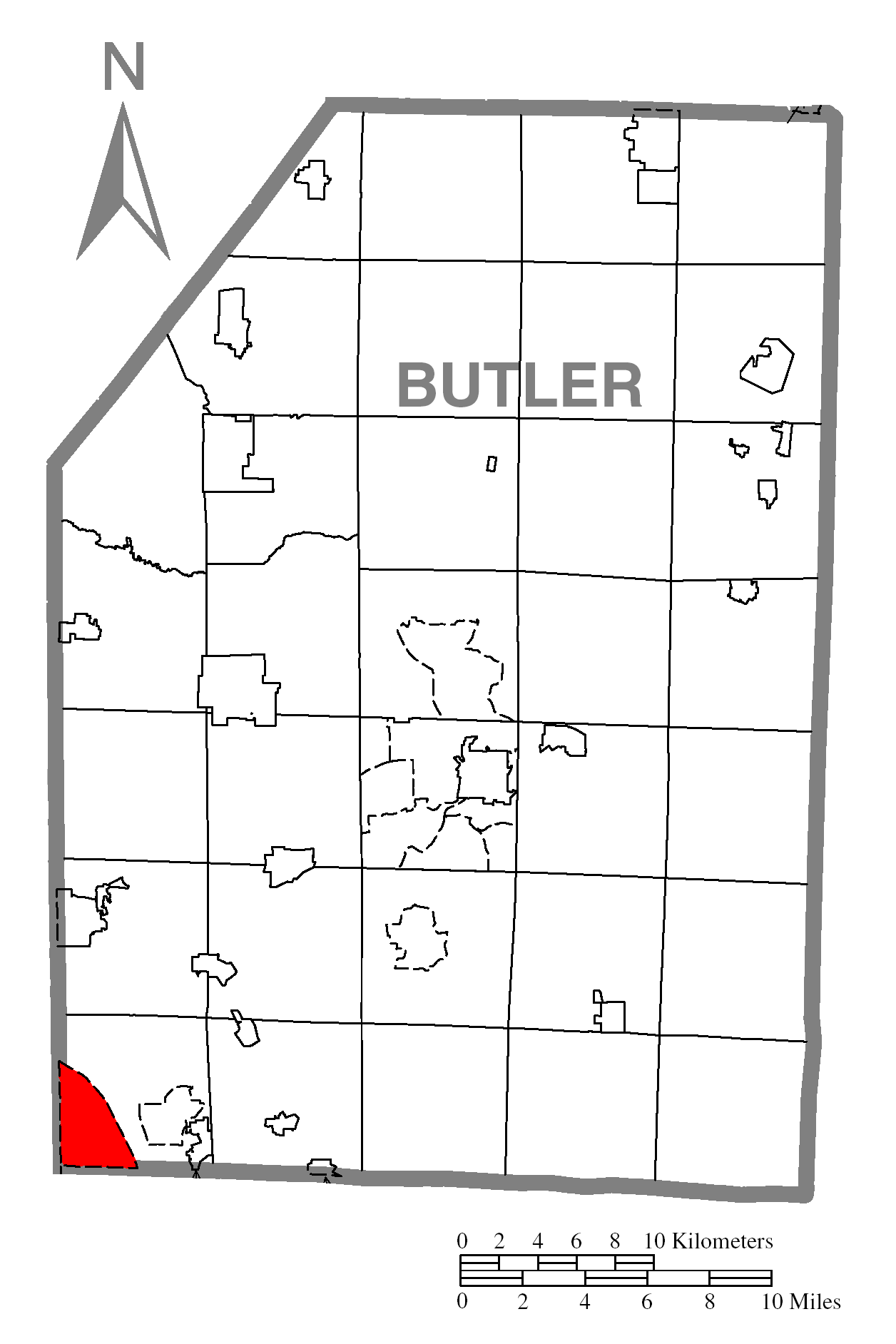
- Location within Butler County

- Location within the U.S. state of Pennsylvania Fernway (the United States)
- Coordinates: 40°41′24″N 80°7′45″W
- Country: United States
- State: Pennsylvania
- County: Butler
- Township: Cranberry

Area
  - Total: 5.3 sq mi (14 km^{2})
  - Land: 5.3 sq mi (14 km^{2})

Population (2000)
  - Total: 12,188
  - Density: 2,300/sq mi (890/km^{2})
- Time zone: UTC-5 (Eastern (EST))
  - Summer (DST): UTC-4 (EDT)

Fernway is a neighborhood in Cranberry Township, Butler County, Pennsylvania, United States. It includes 458 homes on 183 acres and was the first planned housing subdivision in the Township, dating back to the 1950s. Fernway was formerly used as the name of a census-designated place (CDP), but the designation was removed as of the U.S. Census TIGER 2013 geospatial/map data update after Cranberry Township officials pointed out that creators of Internet mapping websites frequently misinterpreted the name of the CDP as the name of the parent township.

== Geography ==
Fernway is located at 40°41′24″N 80°7′45″W (40.689901, −80.129035).

According to the United States Census Bureau, the CDP had a total area of 5.3 square miles (14 km^{2}), all land.

== Demographics ==
As of the 2000 census, there were 12,188 people, 4,224 households, and 3,451 families residing in the CDP. The population density was 2,286.9 inhabitants per square mile (883.0/km^{2}). There were 4,338 housing units at an average density of 814.0 per square mile (314.3/km^{2}). The racial makeup of the CDP was 97.05% White, 1.06% African American, 0.03% Native American, 1.07% Asian, 0.01% Pacific Islander, 0.18% from other races, and 0.60% from two or more races. Hispanic or Latino of any race were 0.63% of the population.

There were 4,224 households, out of which 47.1% had children under the age of 18 living with them, 71.2% were married couples living together, 8.1% had a female householder with no husband present, and 18.3% were non-families. 15.2% of all households were made up of individuals, and 3.4% had someone living alone who was 65 years of age or older. The average household size was 2.88 and the average family size was 3.24.

In the CDP the population was spread out, with 31.6% under the age of 18, 5.9% from 18 to 24, 35.8% from 25 to 44, 21.6% from 45 to 64, and 5.1% who were 65 years of age or older. The median age was 34 years. For every 100 females, there were 96.6 males. For every 100 females age 18 and over, there were 92.8 males.

The median income for a household in the CDP was $62,971, and the median income for a family was $70,518. Males had a median income of $51,612 versus $31,290 for females. The per capita income for the CDP was $25,759. About 2.8% of families and 3.6% of the population were below the poverty line, including 4.9% of those under age 18 and 4.9% of those age 65 or over.
