= Parker Township, Pennsylvania =

Township in Pennsylvania, US

Coordinates: 41°02′53″N 79°48′35″W

- Township
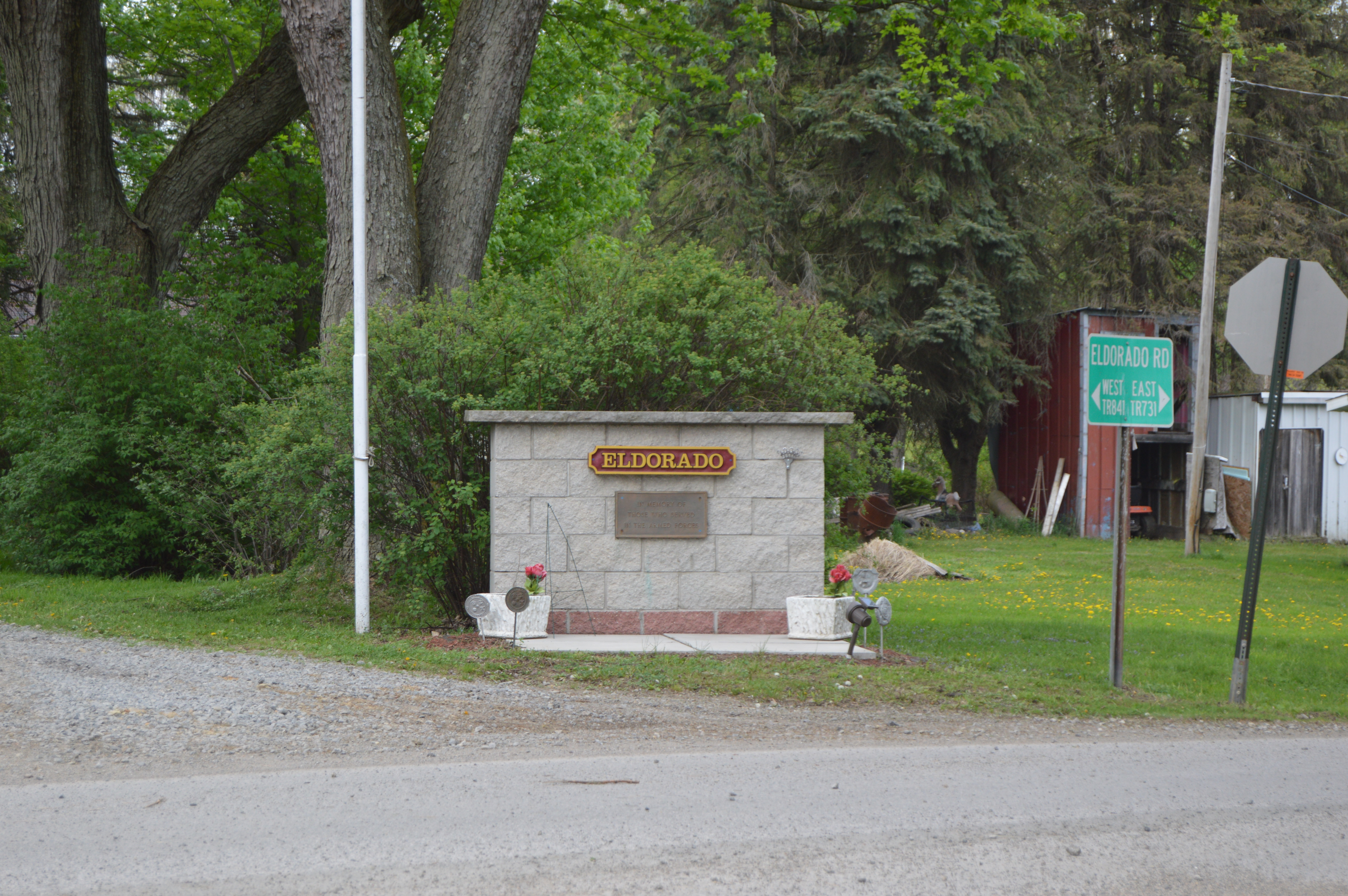
- War memorial at Eldorado

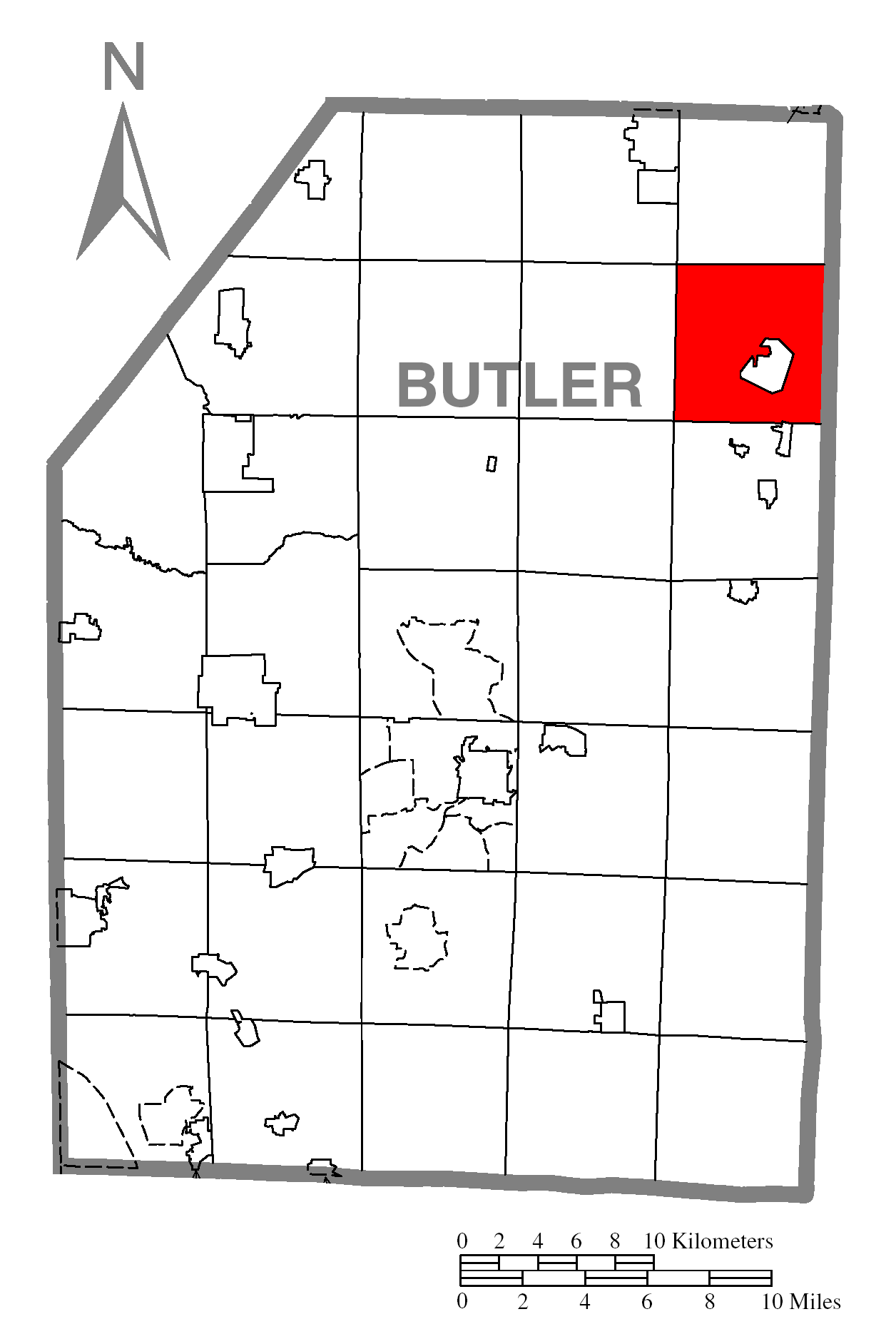
- Map of Butler County, Pennsylvania, highlighting Parker Township

- Map of Butler County, Pennsylvania
- Country: United States
- State: Pennsylvania
- County: Butler
- Settled: 1794
- Incorporated: 1854

Area
  - Total: 22.94 sq mi (59.42 km^{2})
  - Land: 22.94 sq mi (59.42 km^{2})
  - Water: 0 sq mi (0.00 km^{2})

Population (2020)
  - Total: 574 ▼
  - Estimate (2022): 569
  - Density: 27.0/sq mi (10.42/km^{2})
- Time zone: UTC-5 (Eastern (EST))
  - Summer (DST): UTC-4 (EDT)
- FIPS code: 42-019-57984

Parker Township is a township that is located in Butler County, Pennsylvania, United States. The population was 574 at the time of the 2020 census.

== Geography ==
Parker Township is located in northeastern Butler County, along the Armstrong County line. The township surrounds the borough of Bruin but is a separate entity. The city of Parker is along part of the eastern boundary of the township, in Armstrong County. Bear Creek, a tributary of the Allegheny River, flows from south to northeastward through the township.

According to the United States Census Bureau, the township has a total area of 22.9 square miles (59.4 km^{2}), all land.

== Demographics ==
Historical population
Census	Pop.	Note	%±
2010	632		—
2020	574		−9.2%
2022 (est.)	569		−0.9%
U.S. Decennial Census

As of the 2000 census, there were 700 people, 258 households, and 186 families residing in the township. The population density was 29.7 inhabitants per square mile (11.5/km^{2}). There were 297 housing units at an average density of 12.6/sq mi (4.9/km^{2}). The racial makeup of the township was 98.43% White, 0.14% Asian, 0.86% Pacific Islander, and 0.57% from two or more races. Hispanic or Latino of any race were 0.14% of the population.

There were 258 households, out of which 35.7% had children under the age of 18 living with them, 62.4% were married couples living together, 6.2% had a female householder with no husband present, and 27.9% were non-families. 24.4% of all households were made up of individuals, and 8.9% had someone living alone who was 65 years of age or older. The average household size was 2.71 and the average family size was 3.25.

In the township the population was spread out, with 27.7% under the age of 18, 6.7% from 18 to 24, 29.7% from 25 to 44, 22.9% from 45 to 64, and 13.0% who were 65 years of age or older. The median age was 38 years. For every 100 females there were 102.9 males. For every 100 females age 18 and over, there were 104.9 males.

The median income for a household in the township was $33,854, and the median income for a family was $35,703. Males had a median income of $32,315 versus $27,143 for females. The per capita income for the township was $14,434. About 12.2% of families and 18.4% of the population were below the poverty line, including 25.9% of those under age 18 and 14.8% of those age 65 or over.

== Education ==
- Karns City Area School District - public school
- Karns City High School
