= Bruin, Pennsylvania =

Borough in Pennsylvania, US

- Borough
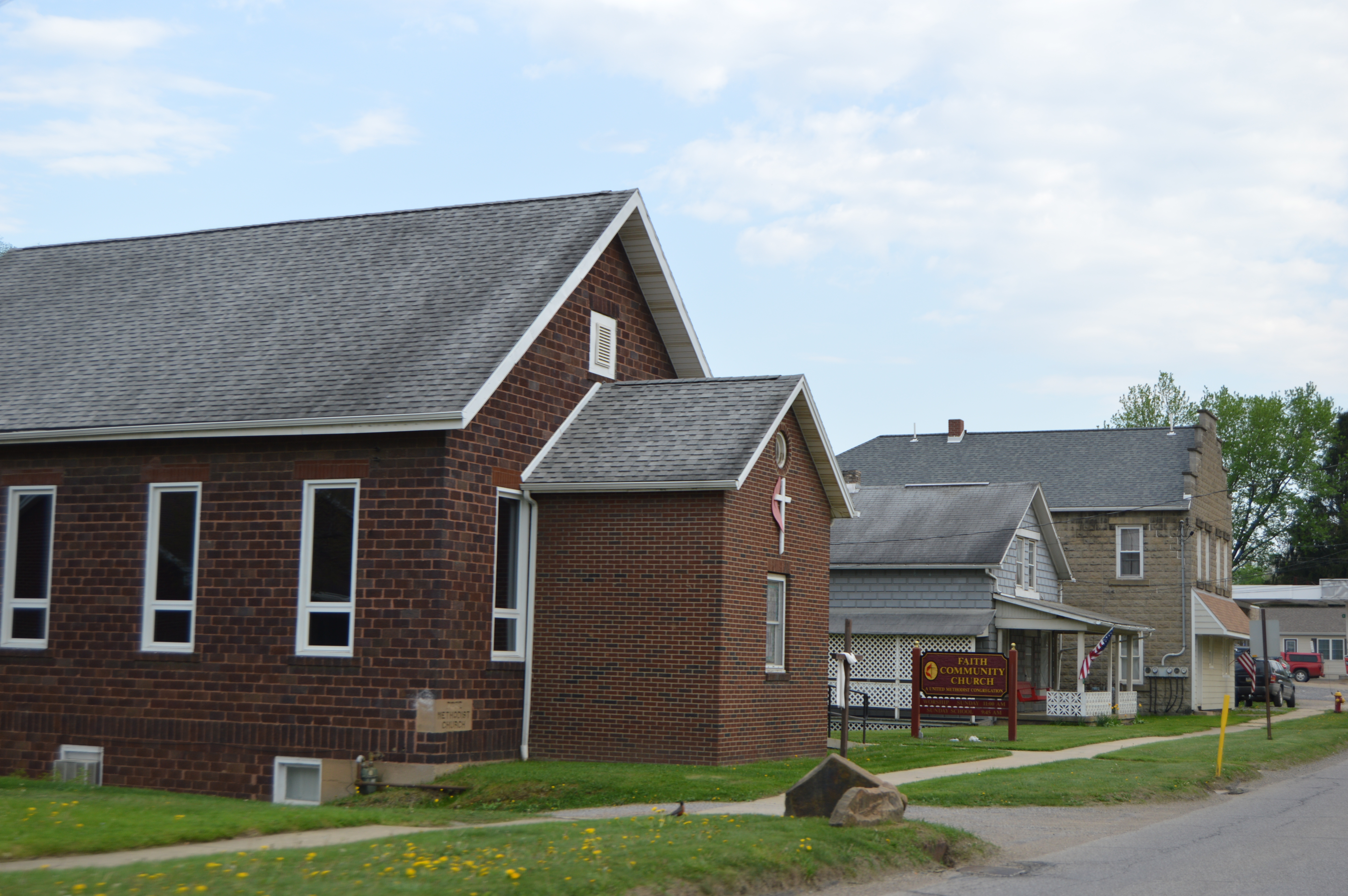
- Buildings on Main Street

- Location of Bruin in Butler County, Pennsylvania.

- Location of Pennsylvania in the United States
- Coordinates: 41°3′26″N 79°43′48″W
- Country: United States
- State: Pennsylvania
- County: Butler County
- Settled: 1901

Area
  - Total: 1.83 sq mi (4.73 km^{2})
  - Land: 1.83 sq mi (4.73 km^{2})
  - Water: 0 sq mi (0.00 km^{2})

Population (2020)
  - Total: 423
  - Density: 231.8/sq mi (89.51/km^{2})
- Time zone: UTC-5 (EST)
  - Summer (DST): UTC-4 (EDT)
- Area code: 724
- FIPS code: 42-09528
- School district: Karns City Area School District

Bruin is a borough in Butler County, Pennsylvania, United States. The population was 423 at the 2020 census.

== Geography ==
Bruin is located in northeastern Butler County in the valley of Bear Creek, a tributary of the Allegheny River. It is approximately 53 miles (85 km) north of Pittsburgh. The borough is surrounded by Parker Township but is separate from it. Pennsylvania Route 268 passes through the center of town, leading northeast 4 miles (6 km) to the city of Parker and south 3 miles (5 km) to Petrolia.

According to the United States Census Bureau, the borough of Bruin has a total area of 1.8 square miles (4.7 km^{2}), all land.

== History ==
Among the early immigrants who settled in the area soon after the close of the Revolutionary War, were a number of north of Ireland families. In 1796, when the settlement of this section of Butler County began, several of these families migrated here, becoming the pioneers of the township. Among those said to have arrived in that year, embracing these north of Ireland families, were a few Germans and a number of native-born Pennsylvanians.

The land was first laid out and surveyed by John Martin in 1837 and was known as Martinsburg, then part of Parker Township. The name was later changed to Bruin. In 1841 Robert Black opened a store near Fletcher's Mill and soon afterward Archibald Martin opened a hotel.

In 1872 came the tidal wave of oil operators, drillers, pumpers and torpedo men, the population rapidly increasing to 500 or more. The Connolly Brothers established a machine shop, and the Twohils opened another. W. J. Harshaw came after the oil discoveries and opened a general store. Woods & Markwell came in early. T. G. Campbell carried on business here for a number of years, and H. M. Caldwell and J. A. McKallip established a general store in 1877. In the fall of that year the decrease in oil production and the smallpox epidemic, which carried away five persons, almost depopulated the village and district. A small band of Indians continued to reside here for a number of years, and at intervals the fathers of the little tribe would revisit the settlements. The young Native men, many of whom were doubtless born in the area, frequently returned to hunt deer or panther. The borough was incorporated in 1901.

== Secret societies in the 19th century ==
A lodge of the A.O. U. W. (Ancient Order of United Workmen) was organized in Martinsburg/Bruin in 1873. It was transferred to Petrolia in 1875. The Odd Fellows Lodge, Number 817, was instituted on January 8, 1873, the anniversary of the Battle of New Orleans. Their charter was soon after suspended. United Lodge, Number 127, A.O. U. W., was organized January 25, 1878, with thirty members, J. W. Waters being the first master workman. A hall was erected soon after by the lodge, where W.C. Black's store stood. Bruin Lodge, K. of H. (The Knights of Honor), was instituted March 22, 1878, with seventeen members. A small lodge room was subsequently erected. Thanksgiving Lodge, number 1193, I.O.G.T. (International Organisation of Good Templars), was organized March 15, 1878, and Campbell council of the R.T. of T. September 8, 1880. A local union of the E.A.U. was organized and retained its charter for some time, though meetings were seldom held. The Jr. O.U.A.M. (Junior Order United American Mechanics) was a later organization, and claimed a large membership.

== Demographics ==
Historical population
Census	Pop.	Note	%±
1910	539		—
1920	720		33.6%
1930	622		−13.6%
1940	663		6.6%
1950	717		8.1%
1960	706		−1.5%
1970	673		−4.7%
1980	722		7.3%
1990	646		−10.5%
2000	534		−17.3%
2010	524		−1.9%
2020	423		−19.3%

The population was 423 at the 2020 census.

As of the 2000 census, there were 534 people, 204 households, and 151 families residing in the borough. The population density was 308.8 inhabitants per square mile (119.2/km^{2}). There were 228 housing units at an average density of 131.8 per square mile (50.9/km^{2}). The racial makeup of the borough was 98.69% White, and 1.31% from two or more races. Hispanic or Latino of any race were 0.56% of the population.

There were 204 households, out of which 37.3% had children under the age of 18 living with them, 63.2% were married couples living together, 7.4% had a female householder with no husband present, and 25.5% were non-families. 17.2% of all households were made up of individuals, and 8.8% had someone living alone who was 65 years of age or older. The average household size was 2.62 and the average family size was 2.97.

In the borough the population was spread out, with 26.4% under the age of 18, 8.4% from 18 to 24, 28.8% from 25 to 44, 22.8% from 45 to 64, and 13.5% who were 65 years of age or older. The median age was 39 years. For every 100 females there were 95.6 males. For every 100 females age 18 and over, there were 92.6 males.

The median income for a household in the borough was $29,554, and the median income for a family was $32,500. Males had a median income of $30,192 versus $20,000 for females. The per capita income for the borough was $13,136. About 13.1% of families and 12.9% of the population were below the poverty line, including 14.2% of those under age 18 and 14.6% of those age 65 or over.

== Economy ==
As of 2017, the economy of Bruin employs 210 people. The largest industries in Bruin are Manufacturing (39 people), Retail Trade (33 people), and Other Services, Except Public Administration (23 people), and the highest paying industries are Manufacturing ($68,750), Educational Services ($54,063), and Administrative & Support & Waste Management Services ($45,625).

== Education ==
The borough is served by Karns City Area School District.
