= Petrolia, Pennsylvania =

Borough in Pennsylvania, US

- Borough
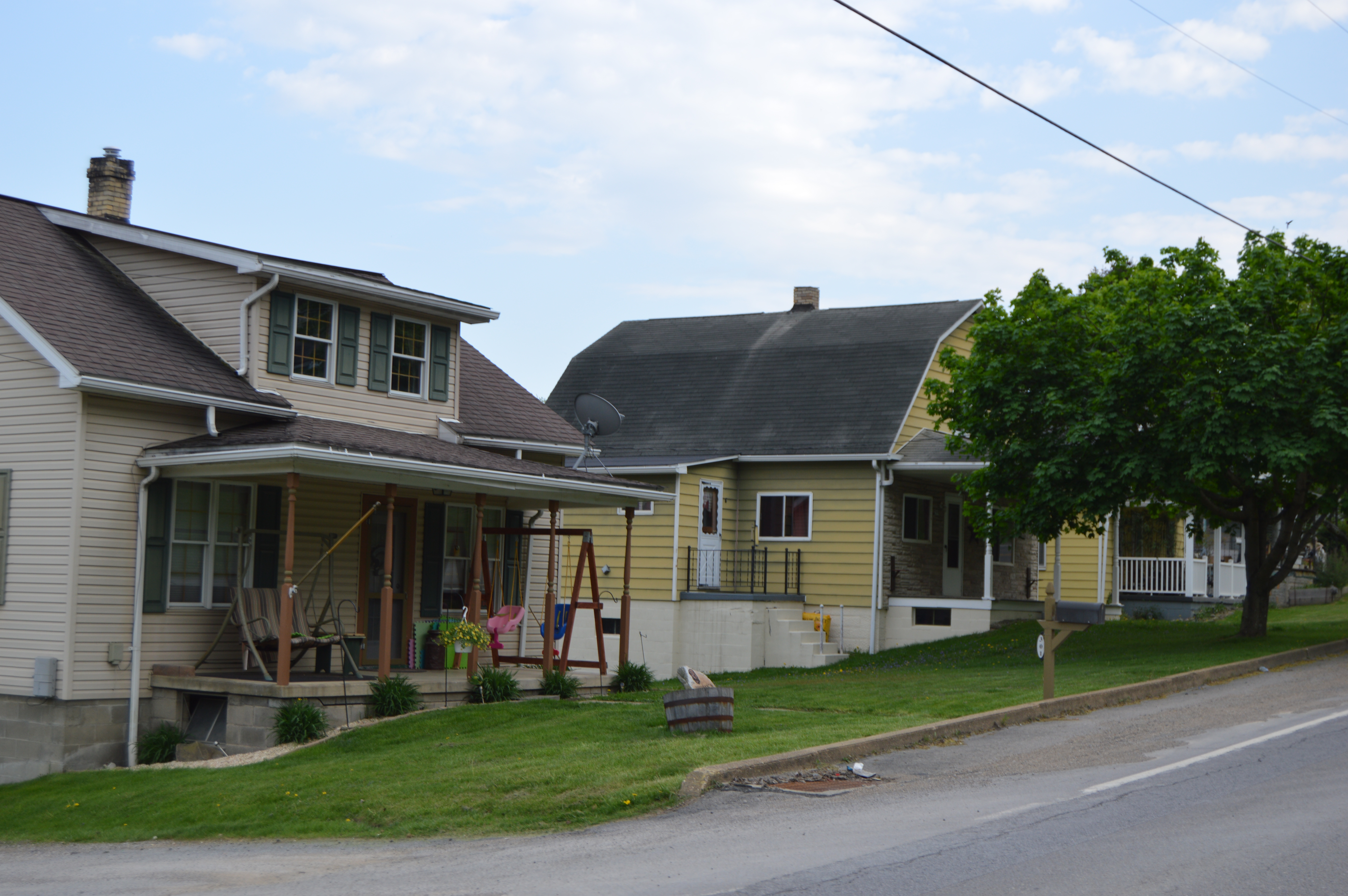
- Neighborhood on Argyle Street

- Location of Petrolia in Butler County, Pennsylvania.

- Location within Pennsylvania
- Coordinates: 41°01′05″N 79°43′06″W
- Country: United States
- State: Pennsylvania
- County: Butler
- Settled: 1872
- Incorporated: 1873

Government
  - Type: Borough Council

Area
  - Total: 0.39 sq mi (1.02 km^{2})
  - Land: 0.39 sq mi (1.02 km^{2})
  - Water: 0 sq mi (0.00 km^{2})
- Elevation: 1,178 ft (359 m)

Population (2020)
  - Total: 179
  - Density: 453.4/sq mi (175.07/km^{2})
- Time zone: UTC-5 (Eastern (EST))
  - Summer (DST): UTC-4 (EDT)
- Zip code: 16050
- FIPS code: 42-59672

Petrolia is a borough in Butler County, Pennsylvania, United States. As of the 2020 census, Petrolia had a population of 179.

== Geography ==
Petrolia is located in eastern Butler County at 41°1′5″N 79°43′6″W (41.017964, −79.718204), in the valley of the South Branch of Bear Creek, a tributary of the Allegheny River.

Pennsylvania Route 268 passes through the borough, leading north 3 miles (5 km) to Bruin and south 1.7 miles (2.7 km) to Karns City.

According to the United States Census Bureau, Petrolia has a total area of 0.39 square miles (1.0 km^{2}), all land.

== Demographics ==
Historical population
Census	Pop.	Note	%±
1880	1,186		—
1890	546		−54.0%
1900	350		−35.9%
1910	360		2.9%
1920	370		2.8%
1930	469		26.8%
1940	559		19.2%
1950	571		2.1%
1960	527		−7.7%
1970	432		−18.0%
1980	472		9.3%
1990	292		−38.1%
2000	218		−25.3%
2010	212		−2.8%
2020	179		−15.6%

As of the 2000 census, there were 218 people, 89 households, and 64 families residing in the borough. The population density was 543.7 inhabitants per square mile (209.9/km^{2}). There were 99 housing units at an average density of 246.9 per square mile (95.3/km^{2}). The racial makeup of the borough was 100.00% White.

There were 89 households, out of which 29.2% had children under the age of 18 living with them, 53.9% were married couples living together, 11.2% had a female householder with no husband present, and 27.0% were non-families. 20.2% of all households were made up of individuals, and 6.7% had someone living alone who was 65 years of age or older. The average household size was 2.45 and the average family size was 2.80.

In the borough the population was spread out, with 21.1% under the age of 18, 8.3% from 18 to 24, 34.4% from 25 to 44, 23.9% from 45 to 64, and 12.4% who were 65 years of age or older. The median age was 38 years. For every 100 females there were 89.6 males. For every 100 females age 18 and over, there were 93.3 males.

The median income for a household in the borough was $29,821, and the median income for a family was $37,708. Males had a median income of $31,875 versus $23,750 for females. The per capita income for the borough was $17,358. About 8.5% of families and 14.5% of the population were below the poverty line, including 23.1% of those under the age of eighteen and none of those sixty five or over.

== Education ==
- Karns City Area School District - public school
- Karns City High School
