= Butler County, Pennsylvania =

County in Pennsylvania, United States

- County
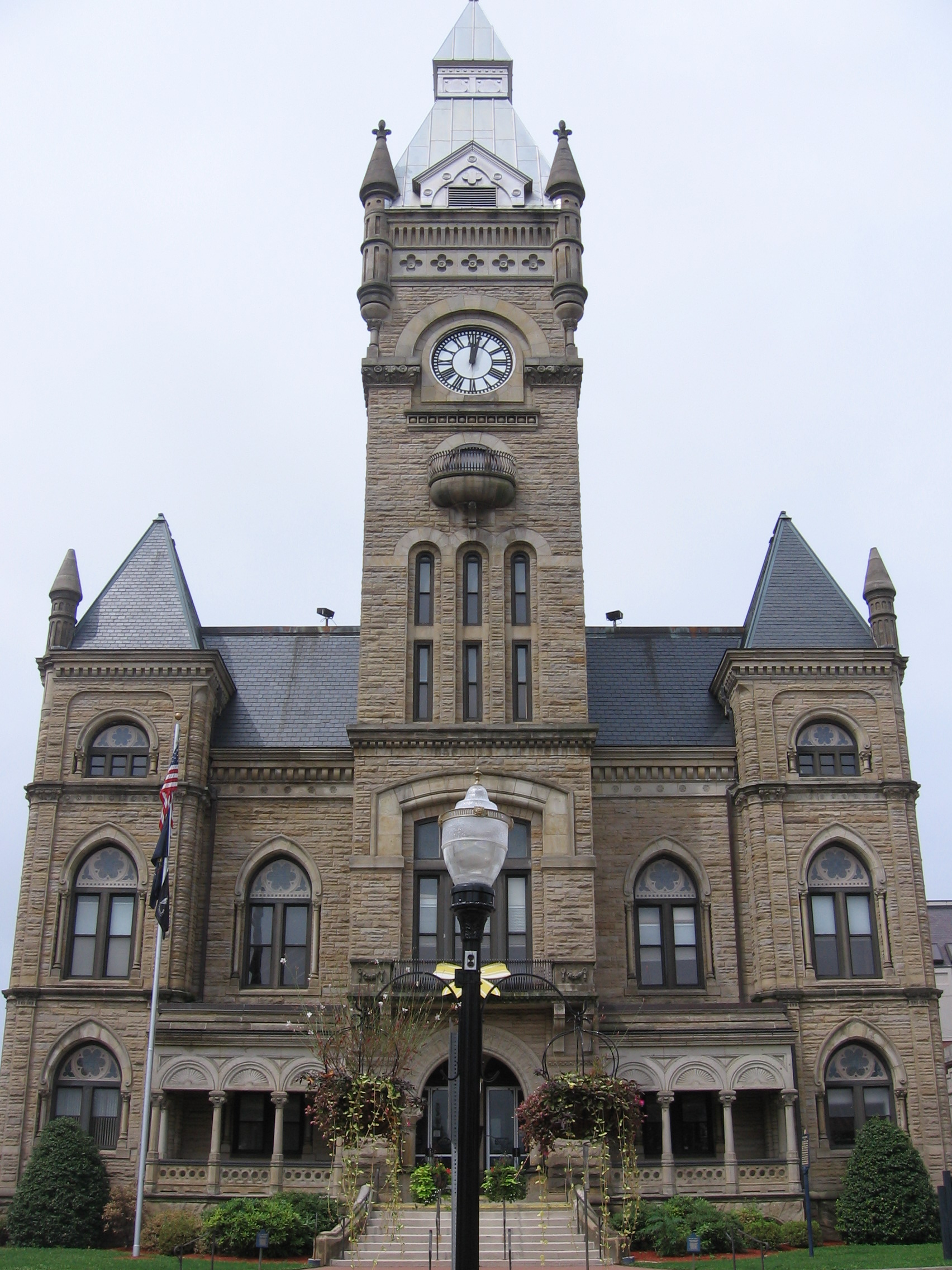
- Butler County Courthouse in Butler, Pennsylvania

- Flag Seal

- Location within the U.S. state of Pennsylvania
- Coordinates: 40°55′N 79°55′W
- Country: United States
- State: Pennsylvania
- Founded: March 12, 1800
- Named for: Richard Butler
- Seat: Butler
- Largest township: Cranberry Township

Area
  - Total: 795 sq mi (2,060 km^{2})
  - Land: 789 sq mi (2,040 km^{2})
  - Water: 6.1 sq mi (16 km^{2}) 0.8%

Population (2020)
  - Total: 193,763
  - Estimate (2025): 200,169 ▲
  - Density: 246/sq mi (94.8/km^{2})
- Time zone: UTC−5 (Eastern)
  - Summer (DST): UTC−4 (EDT)
- Congressional district: 16th
- Website: www.butlercountypa.gov

Pennsylvania Historical Marker
- Designated: June 11, 1982

Butler County is a county in the Commonwealth of Pennsylvania. As of the 2020 census, the population was 193,763. Its county seat is Butler. Butler County was created on March 12, 1800, from part of Allegheny County and named in honor of General Richard Butler, a hero of the American Revolution. The county is part of the Pittsburgh region of the commonwealth. (Note: Includes Allegheny, Washington, Butler, Beaver, Lawrence and Armstrong Counties)

== History ==
Some famous inventions and discoveries were made in Butler County. Saxonburg was founded as a Prussian colony by John A. Roebling, a civil engineer, and his brother Carl. After farming for a time, Roebling returned to engineering, and invented his revolutionary "wire rope," which he first produced at Saxonburg. He moved the operation to Trenton, New Jersey. He is best known for designing his most famous work, the Brooklyn Bridge, but designed and built numerous bridges in Pittsburgh and other cities as well.

At what is now known as Oil Creek, Butler County resident William Smith and Edwin Drake first proved oil could be tapped from underground for consistent supply.

The Jeep was developed in Butler County by American Bantam in 1941.

Famous politicians have lived in and traveled through Butler County. U.S. Senator Walter Lowrie, the only senator from Butler, built a home in 1828 that still stands behind the Butler County Courthouse. The house has been adapted for use by the Butler County Historical Society. Butler's highest-ranked federal official is William J. Perry, Secretary of Defense under President Bill Clinton from 1994 to 1997. He graduated from Butler High School in 1945.

The 21-year-old George Washington passed through this area in December 1753 following his mission to Fort Le Boeuf in the lead-up to the French and Indian War and narrowly escaped an assassination attempt by a French-aligned Native American who escaped from the scene. In 1923, the funeral train of President Warren G. Harding passed through Butler County on its way to Washington, D.C. John F. Kennedy spoke in front of the Butler County Courthouse during the 1960 United States presidential election. Hubert Humphrey also campaigned in Butler. In 2004, Vice President Dick Cheney spoke in Saxonburg to campaign for President George W. Bush in the 2004 United States presidential election. Donald Trump, while president, campaigned at the Butler County Airport in 2020.

On July 13, 2024, Butler County was the site of an assassination attempt of former President Donald Trump as he spoke at a campaign rally. Trump was shot in the ear and one spectator was killed. The shooter was also killed. The next day, authorities named Thomas Matthew Crooks as the perpetrator.

Bret Michaels, lead singer of the rock band Poison, was born here in 1963.

== Geography ==
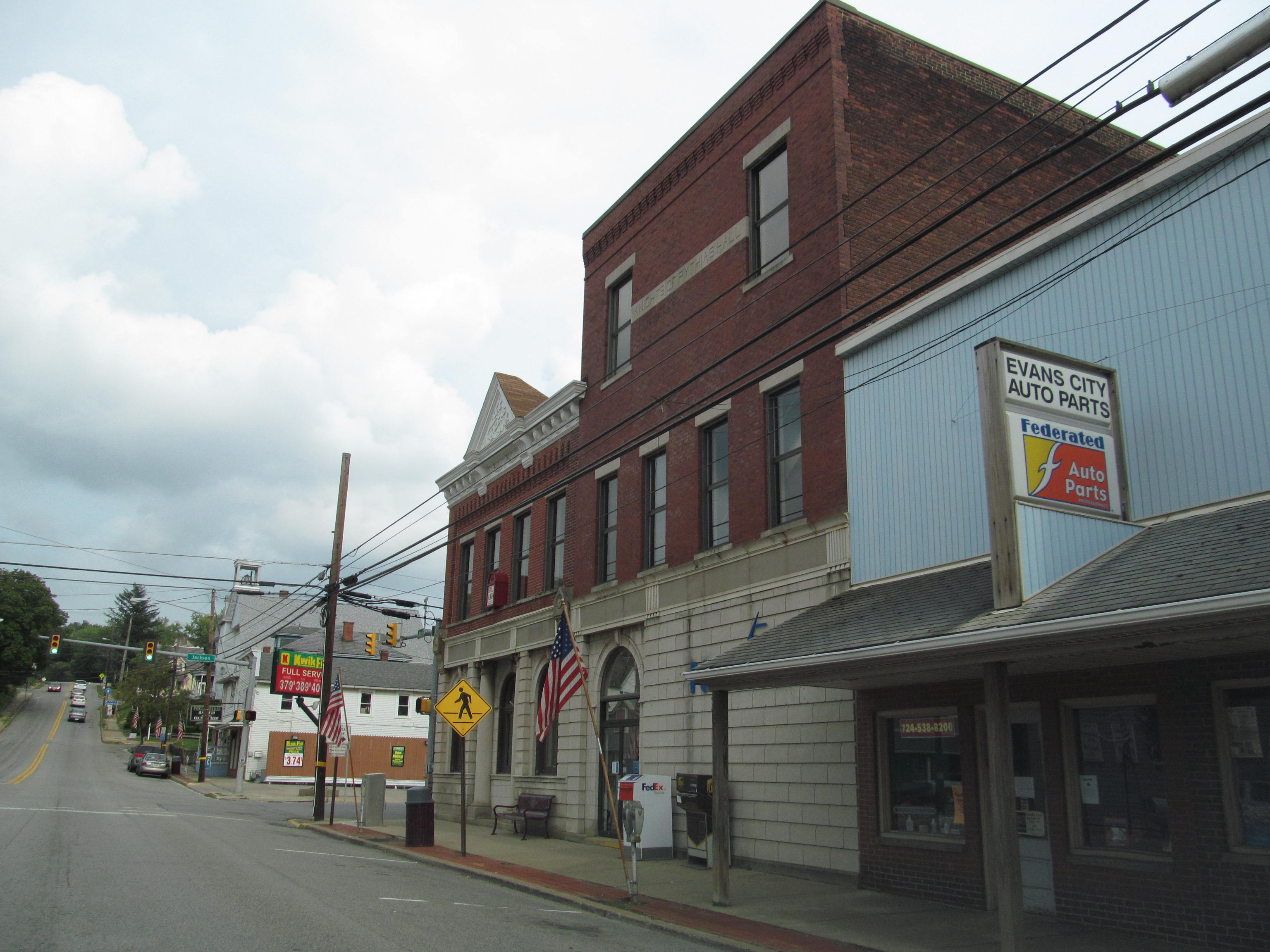
The downtown of Evans City

According to the U.S. Census Bureau, the county has a total area of 795 square miles (2,060 km^{2}), of which 789 square miles (2,040 km^{2}) is land and 6.1 square miles (16 km^{2}) (0.8%) is water. Butler County is one of the 423 counties served by the Appalachian Regional Commission, and it is identified as part of the "Midlands" by Colin Woodard in his book American Nations: A History of the Eleven Rival Regional Cultures of North America.

It is the location of Moraine State Park, with the 3,000-acre (12 km^{2}) glacial lake, Lake Arthur. Lake Arthur is used for fishing and sailing, and the surrounding park is used for hiking and hunting.

=== Climate ===
The county has a warm-summer humid continental climate (Dfb), except for areas south of Moraine State Park where it is hot-summer (Dfa). Average monthly temperatures in Butler borough range from 27.7 °F (−2.4 °C) in January to 72.1 °F (22.3 °C) in July.

=== Waterways ===
- Allegheny River (The river touches Butler County at its northeast and southeast corners. It is both a recreational and industrial waterway.)
- Connoquenessing Creek (recreational canoeing and kayaking)
- Lake Arthur at Moraine State Park (recreational boating, canoeing and kayaking)
- Slippery Rock Creek (recreational canoeing and kayaking)
- Little Connoquenessing Creek
- Bull Creek
- Muddy Creek
- Sullivan Run
- Semiconon Run
- Mulligan Run
- Bear Creek (Allegheny River tributary)

=== Adjacent counties ===
- Venango County (north)
- Clarion County (northeast)
- Armstrong County (east)
- Westmoreland County (southeast)
- Allegheny County (south)
- Beaver County (southwest)
- Lawrence County (west)
- Mercer County (northwest)

== Demographics ==
Historical population
Census	Pop.	Note	%±
1800	3,916		—
1810	7,346		87.6%
1820	10,193		38.8%
1830	14,581		43.0%
1840	22,378		53.5%
1850	30,346		35.6%
1860	35,594		17.3%
1870	36,510		2.6%
1880	52,536		43.9%
1890	55,339		5.3%
1900	56,962		2.9%
1910	72,689		27.6%
1920	77,270		6.3%
1930	80,480		4.2%
1940	87,590		8.8%
1950	97,320		11.1%
1960	114,639		17.8%
1970	127,941		11.6%
1980	147,912		15.6%
1990	152,013		2.8%
2000	174,083		14.5%
2010	183,862		5.6%
2020	193,763		5.4%
2025 (est.)	200,169	▲	3.3%
U.S. Decennial Census; 1790-1960 1900-1990; 1990-2000 2010-2019

=== 2020 census ===
As of the 2020 census, the county had a population of 193,763. The median age was 43.6 years. 19.8% of residents were under the age of 18 and 20.0% of residents were 65 years of age or older. For every 100 females there were 97.9 males, and for every 100 females age 18 and over there were 96.3 males age 18 and over.

The racial makeup of the county was 92.5% White, 1.2% Black or African American, 0.1% American Indian and Alaska Native, 1.5% Asian, <0.1% Native Hawaiian and Pacific Islander, 0.7% from some other race, and 4.1% from two or more races. Hispanic or Latino residents of any race comprised 1.9% of the population.

Butler County, Pennsylvania – Racial and ethnic composition Note: the US Census treats Hispanic/Latino as an ethnic category. This table excludes Latinos from the racial categories and assigns them to a separate category. Hispanics/Latinos may be of any race.
Race / Ethnicity (NH = Non-Hispanic)	Pop 2000	Pop 2010	Pop 2020	% 2000	% 2010	% 2020
White alone (NH)	169,634	176,259	178,081	97.44%	95.86%	91.90%
Black or African American alone (NH)	1,343	1,954	2,174	0.77%	1.06%	1.12%
Native American or Alaska Native alone (NH)	139	166	154	0.07%	0.09%	0.07%
Asian alone (NH)	973	1,826	2,792	0.55%	0.99%	1.44%
Pacific Islander alone (NH)	51	47	36	0.02%	0.02%	0.01%
Other race alone (NH)	86	102	577	0.04%	0.05%	0.29%
Mixed race or Multiracial (NH)	841	1,567	6,284	0.48%	0.85%	3.24%
Hispanic or Latino (any race)	1,016	1,941	3,665	0.58%	1.05%	1.89%
Total	174,083	183,862	193,763	100.00%	100.00%	100.00%

56.7% of residents lived in urban areas, while 43.3% lived in rural areas.

There were 78,727 households in the county, of which 26.6% had children under the age of 18 living in them. Of all households, 53.8% were married-couple households, 17.6% were households with a male householder and no spouse or partner present, and 22.8% were households with a female householder and no spouse or partner present. About 28.0% of all households were made up of individuals and 12.7% had someone living alone who was 65 years of age or older.

There were 85,019 housing units, of which 7.4% were vacant. Among occupied housing units, 75.5% were owner-occupied and 24.5% were renter-occupied. The homeowner vacancy rate was 1.2% and the rental vacancy rate was 8.2%.

=== 2000 census ===
As of the 2000 census, there were 174,083 people, 65,862 households, and 46,827 families residing in the county. The population density was 221 inhabitants per square mile (85/km^{2}). There were 69,868 housing units at an average density of 89 units per square mile (34/km^{2}). The racial/ethnic makeup of the county is 96.5% White, 0.9% Black or African American, 0.09% Native American, 0.8% Asian, 0.03% Pacific Islander, 0.17% from other races, 0.7% from two or more races; and 0.9% Hispanic or Latino of any race. 39.0% German, 20.8% Irish, 13.1% Italian, 8.6% English, and 7.8% Polish. There were 65,862 households, out of which 32.90% had children under the age of 18 living with them, 59.80% were married couples living together, 8.10% had a female householder with no husband present, and 28.90% were non-families. 24.20% of all households were made up of individuals, and 10.40% had someone living alone who was 65 years of age or older. The average household size was 2.55 and the average family size was 3.04.

In the county, the population was spread out, with 24.60% under the age of 18, 8.80% from 18 to 24, 29.40% from 25 to 44, 23.00% from 45 to 64, and 14.30% who were 65 years of age or older. The median age was 38 years. For every 100 females, there were 95.40 males. For every 100 females age 18 and over, there were 91.80 males.

== Law and government ==
United States presidential election results for Butler County, Pennsylvania
Year	Republican		Democratic		Third party(ies)	
Year	No.	%	No.	%	No.	%
1880	5,269	50.96%	4,678	45.24%	393	3.80%
1884	5,217	52.43%	4,236	42.57%	497	4.99%
1888	5,358	53.84%	3,986	40.06%	607	6.10%
1892	5,019	50.17%	4,161	41.59%	824	8.24%
1896	6,821	55.42%	5,127	41.66%	360	2.92%
1900	6,303	55.85%	4,465	39.57%	517	4.58%
1904	6,596	63.43%	3,187	30.65%	616	5.92%
1908	6,584	54.15%	4,698	38.64%	877	7.21%
1912	1,273	11.35%	4,022	35.86%	5,920	52.79%
1916	5,458	47.18%	4,544	39.28%	1,566	13.54%
1920	10,467	66.87%	3,829	24.46%	1,357	8.67%
1924	13,113	69.45%	3,462	18.34%	2,305	12.21%
1928	19,880	75.51%	6,283	23.87%	164	0.62%
1932	11,543	54.77%	8,717	41.36%	815	3.87%
1936	16,772	50.35%	16,008	48.06%	529	1.59%
1940	19,450	58.17%	13,875	41.49%	114	0.34%
1944	19,341	60.55%	12,377	38.75%	226	0.71%
1948	17,449	62.94%	9,818	35.41%	457	1.65%
1952	25,243	61.99%	15,295	37.56%	185	0.45%
1956	26,238	65.61%	13,672	34.19%	79	0.20%
1960	28,348	61.22%	17,805	38.45%	152	0.33%
1964	17,360	38.82%	27,267	60.97%	95	0.21%
1968	21,618	47.73%	19,415	42.87%	4,258	9.40%
1972	29,665	65.09%	14,695	32.24%	1,214	2.66%
1976	26,366	52.52%	22,611	45.04%	1,221	2.43%
1980	28,821	54.70%	19,711	37.41%	4,157	7.89%
1984	31,676	55.94%	24,735	43.68%	215	0.38%
1988	27,777	54.82%	22,341	44.09%	549	1.08%
1992	23,656	38.70%	22,303	36.48%	15,171	24.82%
1996	32,038	52.88%	21,990	36.29%	6,563	10.83%
2000	44,009	62.12%	25,037	35.34%	1,803	2.54%
2004	54,959	64.34%	30,090	35.22%	376	0.44%
2008	57,074	62.88%	32,260	35.54%	1,427	1.57%
2012	59,761	66.62%	28,550	31.83%	1,388	1.55%
2016	64,428	65.71%	28,584	29.15%	5,032	5.13%
2020	74,359	65.42%	37,508	33.00%	1,796	1.58%
2024	79,773	65.45%	40,661	33.36%	1,444	1.18%

United States Senate election results for Butler County, Pennsylvania1
Year	Republican		Democratic		Third party(ies)	
Year	No.	%	No.	%	No.	%
1994	29,648	61.02%	16,508	33.97%	2,434	5.01%
2000	44,568	62.91%	24,816	35.03%	1,462	2.06%
2006	34,253	55.18%	27,818	44.82%	0	0.00%
2012	56,320	63.50%	30,620	34.52%	1,751	1.97%
2018	46,875	58.97%	31,010	39.01%	1,610	2.03%
2024	77,328	63.92%	40,973	33.87%	2,666	2.20%

United States Senate election results for Butler County, Pennsylvania3
Year	Republican		Democratic		Third party(ies)	
Year	No.	%	No.	%	No.	%
1992	30,929	51.08%	24,901	41.12%	4,725	7.80%
1998	29,798	66.98%	12,504	28.11%	2,183	4.91%
2004	48,258	57.69%	25,439	30.41%	9,957	11.90%
2010	44,429	68.46%	20,471	31.54%	0	0.00%
2016	62,425	64.62%	28,715	29.72%	5,465	5.66%
2022	57,168	61.25%	33,921	36.34%	2,246	2.41%

Pennsylvania Gubernatorial election results for Butler County
Year	Republican		Democratic		Third party(ies)	
Year	No.	%	No.	%	No.	%
1970	13,670	39.84%	19,299	56.24%	1,344	3.92%
1974	19,117	52.31%	16,577	45.36%	854	2.34%
1978	17,003	42.16%	23,027	57.09%	302	0.75%
1982	24,489	53.08%	21,029	45.58%	614	1.33%
1986	19,750	52.10%	17,697	46.69%	459	1.21%
1990	12,715	33.42%	25,327	66.58%	0	0.00%
1994	21,746	44.68%	13,514	27.76%	13,414	27.56%
1998	22,839	51.22%	10,593	23.76%	11,154	25.02%
2002	32,400	62.34%	18,145	34.91%	1,427	2.75%
2006	38,613	60.76%	24,936	39.24%	0	0.00%
2010	47,151	71.93%	18,404	28.07%	0	0.00%
2014	35,818	63.97%	20,171	36.03%	0	0.00%
2018	45,242	56.76%	32,891	41.26%	1,578	1.98%
2022	51,546	55.15%	40,065	42.87%	1,850	1.98%

=== County commissioners ===
Office	Holder	Party
Commissioner	Leslie Osche	Republican
Commissioner	Kim Geyer	Republican
Commissioner	Kevin Boozel	Democratic

=== Other elected row officers ===
Office	Holder	Party
District Attorney	Richard Goldinger	Republican
Controller	Ben Holland	Republican
Treasurer	Diane Marburger	Republican
Prothonotary	Kelly Ferrari	Republican
Clerk of Courts	Tammy Thibodeau	Republican
Sheriff	Michael Slupe	Republican
Recorder of Deeds	Michele Mustello	Republican
Register of Wills	Sara Edwards	Republican

=== Judges on the Court of Common Pleas ===
- Dr. S. Michael Yeager (president judge)
- Kelly Streib
- William Robinson Jr.
- Joseph Kubit
- Maura Palumbi
- Matthew McCune
- John Scialabba
- William Shaffer (senior judge)
- Timothy McCune (senior judge)

=== District judges ===
- Kevin P. O'Donnell
- Joseph Nash
- Lewis Stoughton
- Jack D. Ripper
- Kevin Flaherty
- B.T. Fullerton
- Amy Marcinkiewicz

=== State Senate ===
Senator	Party	District
Scott Hutchinson	Republican	Pennsylvania's 21st Senatorial District
Elder Vogel	Republican	Pennsylvania's 47th Senatorial District

=== State House of Representatives ===
Representative	Party	District
Aaron Bernstine	Republican	Pennsylvania's 8th Representative District
Marci Mustello	Republican	Pennsylvania's 11th Representative District
Brandon Dukes	Democratic	Pennsylvania's 12th Representative District
Timothy R. Bonner	Republican	Pennsylvania's 17th Representative District

=== United States House of Representatives ===
Representative	Party	District
Mike Kelly	Republican	Pennsylvania's 16th congressional district

=== United States Senate ===
Senator	Party
John Fetterman	Democratic
Dave McCormick	Republican

=== Politics ===
Butler County has long been one of the most consistently Republican counties in Pennsylvania and the nation. The last Democratic presidential candidate to win it was Lyndon B. Johnson in 1964, when he won a national landslide and carried all but four counties in the state; indeed, Johnson is the only Democratic presidential candidate to carry this county in over a century. In 2000, Republican George W. Bush received 62% of the vote, while Democrat Al Gore received 35%. In 2004, the county was carried by Bush's 64% to Democrat John Kerry's 35%. In 2008, the county was carried by Republican John McCain's 63% to Democrat Barack Obama's 35%. Since 2008, Butler County has continually given Republican nominees support in the mid-60s, with both Mitt Romney and Donald Trump receiving around 66% of the vote in 2012, 2016, 2020, and 2024.

In 2024, by political party, almost 80,000 residents registered as Republican, almost 40,000 registered as Democratic, and about 20,000 are neither Democratic nor Republican. The New York Times described the county as being politically conservative.

=== Voter registration ===
Chart of voter registration
1. Republican (57.2%)
2. Democratic (28.2%)
3. Independent (10.6%)
4. Other Parties (4.00%)

As of September 30, 2024, there are 142,305 registered voters in Butler County.

- Republican: 81,434 (57.22%)
- Democratic: 40,113 (28.19%)
- Independent: 15,061 (10.58%)
- Third Party: 5,697 (4.00%)

== Education ==
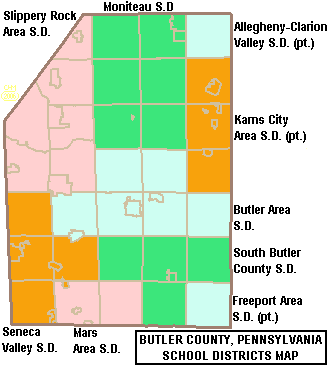
Map of Butler County, Pennsylvania Public School Districts

=== Colleges and universities ===
- Butler County Community College
- Slippery Rock University

=== Technical schools ===
- Butler County Vo-Tech

=== Public school districts ===
K-12 school districts include:

- Allegheny-Clarion Valley School District (part)
- Butler Area School District
- Freeport Area School District (part)
- Karns City Area School District (part)
- Knoch School District (formerly the South Butler County School District)
- Mars Area School District
- Moniteau School District
- Seneca Valley School District
- Slippery Rock Area School District

As of 2024, several area school districts, as a tradition, gave school holidays when the deer hunting season began.

=== Public libraries ===
The Butler County Federated Library System (additionally known as the Library System of Butler County) includes the ten listed libraries. Each library is managed by its own Board of Directors. The majority of the funding for these libraries comes from state grants, user fines and donations with additional financial contributions from Butler County. The first Butler library originated in 1894 with the Literary Society of Butler in what is now known as the Little Red Schoolhouse. The Butler Area Public Library, built in 1921, was the last Carnegie library built in Pennsylvania. In the intervening 27 years the library was independently operated. From 1921 to 1941 the library quadrupled the number of patrons served. In 1987 the County commissioners, through a resolution, founded the Butler County Federated Library System.

- Butler Area Public Library
- Chicora Community Library
- Cranberry Public Library
- Evans City Public Library
- Mars Area Public Library
- North Trails Public Library
- Prospect Community Library
- Slippery Rock Community Library
- South Butler Community Library
- Zelienople Area Public Library

== Media ==
- Butler Eagle daily newspaper
- WBUT-AM
- WISR-AM
- WLER-FM

== Recreation ==
=== Arts and culture ===
The Butler County Symphony Orchestra (BCSO), is Butler County's largest performing arts non-profit. Founded in 1948 as the Butler Orchestral Association, the BCSO has been in continuous operations since its first concert in April 1950. Edward Roncone served as the first music director and conductor, and the inaugural performance also served as the sesquicentennial (150 years) celebration of Butler County. The BCSO currently sponsors six subscription concerts, a Chamber Music Series, and a Summer Concert Series, making them operate as a year-round performing arts organization.

=== Parks ===
There are two Pennsylvania state parks in Butler County.

- Jennings Environmental Education Center is the home of the only protected relict prairie in Pennsylvania.
- Moraine State Park The gently rolling hills, lush forests and sparkling waters disguise a land that has endured the effects of continental glaciers and massive mineral extraction. Each year over one million people visit the 16,725-acre (67.68 km^{2}) park, yet never realize that many people helped restore the park from prior coal mining and oil and gas drilling practices. Today, the park is an outstanding example of environmental engineering achievement. During the third great ice advance about 140,000 years ago, a continental glacier dammed area creeks making three glacial lakes. To the north, Slippery Rock Creek filled giant Lake Edmund. To the southeast, extinct McConnells Run filled tiny Lake Prouty. In the middle, Muddy Creek filled the medium-sized Lake Watts.

Before the glacier dam, Slippery Rock and Muddy creeks flowed north while extinct McConnells Run flowed south. The glacier dammed Lake Prouty on the edge of the drainage divide. Eventually Lake Pouty spilled over and rushed to the south, carving Slippery Rock Creek Gorge. Lakes Watts and Edmund drained into the gorge, digging it deeper and making Slippery Rock and Muddy creeks flow south. Areas of the 400-foot (120 m) deep Slippery Rock Gorge may be seen at nearby McConnells Mill State Park.

The glacier created a landscape of rolling hills topped with hardwood trees and swamps in the valley bottoms. Moraines containing gravel, sand and clay were draped upon the landscape and silt was left on the extinct lake bottoms.

=== Trails ===
- Butler-Freeport Trail – A rail trail that connects the city of Butler with the borough of Freeport.
- North Country Trail – The trail passes through Jennings Environmental Education Center and Moraine State Park, as well as several State Game Lands.
- Washington's Trail – A regional scenic byway road trail that roughly follows the route George Washington and Christopher Gist took on the Venango Path from the Forks of the Ohio to Fort Le Boeuf in 1753.
- There is also a trail in Slippery Rock Township that connects with McConnells Mill State Park in Lawrence County.

== Transportation ==
=== Airports ===
- Butler County Airport
- Butler Farm Show Airport
- Lakehill Airport

=== Major roads and highways ===
- I-76 / Penna Turnpike
- I-79
- I-80
- US 19
- US 422
- PA 8
- PA 28
- PA 38
- PA 58
- PA 68
- PA 108
- PA 138
- PA 173
- PA 228
- PA 258
- PA 268
- PA 288
- PA 308
- PA 356
- PA 488
- PA 528
- PA 588

=== Transit ===
- Butler Transit Authority

== Communities ==
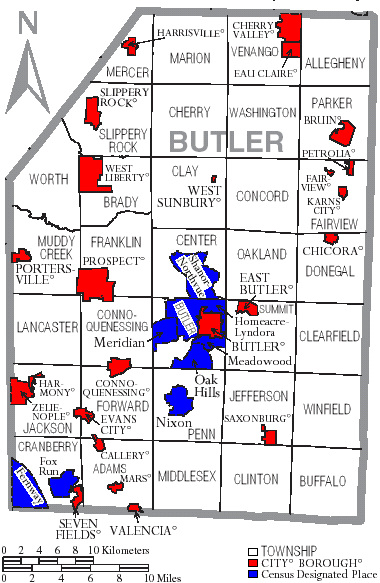
Map of Butler County, Pennsylvania with Municipal Labels showing Cities and Boroughs (red), Townships (white), and Census-designated places (blue).

Under Pennsylvania law, there are four types of incorporated municipalities: cities, boroughs, townships, and, in at most two cases, towns. The following cities, boroughs and townships are located in Butler County:

=== City ===
- Butler (county seat)

=== Boroughs ===
- Bruin
- Callery
- Cherry Valley
- Chicora
- Connoquenessing
- East Butler
- Eau Claire
- Evans City
- Fairview
- Harmony
- Harrisville
- Karns City
- Mars
- Petrolia
- Portersville
- Prospect
- Saxonburg
- Seven Fields
- Slippery Rock
- Valencia
- West Liberty
- West Sunbury
- Zelienople

=== Townships ===
- Adams
- Allegheny
- Brady
- Buffalo
- Butler
- Center
- Cherry
- Clay
- Clearfield
- Clinton
- Concord
- Connoquenessing
- Cranberry
- Donegal
- Fairview
- Forward
- Franklin
- Jackson
- Jefferson
- Lancaster
- Marion
- Mercer
- Middlesex
- Muddy Creek
- Oakland
- Parker
- Penn
- Slippery Rock
- Summit
- Venango
- Washington
- Winfield
- Worth

=== Census-designated places ===
Census-designated places are geographical areas designated by the U.S. Census Bureau for the purposes of compiling demographic data. They are not actual jurisdictions under Pennsylvania law. Other unincorporated communities, such as villages, may be listed here as well.

- Fernway
- Forestville
- Homeacre-Lyndora
- Lake Arthur Estates
- Meadowood
- Meridian
- Nixon
- Oak Hills
- Shanor-Northvue
- Slippery Rock University
- Unionville

=== Unincorporated communities ===
Several of these communities, most notably Renfrew, Lyndora, Herman, Sarver, Cabot, Boyers, and Forestville, have post offices and zip codes, but aren't officially incorporated under Pennsylvania law, and exist entirely within townships.

- Boyers
- Branchton
- Bredinville
- Cabot
- Eidenau
- Forestville
- Fox Run
- Glade Mills
- Greece City
- Herman
- Hilliards
- Hooker
- Lyndora
- Meridian
- Mt Chestnut
- Muddy Creek Flats
- Murrinsville
- Renfrew
- Sarver
- Unionville
- Wahlville
- Watters

=== Population ranking ===
The population ranking of the following table is based on the 2010 census of Butler County.

† county seat

Rank	City/town/etc.	Municipal type	Population (2010 census)
1	† Butler	City	13,757
2	Fernway (former CDP)	CDP	12,414
3	Homeacre-Lyndora	CDP	6,906
4	Shanor-Northvue	CDP	5,051
5	Meridian	CDP	3,881
6	Zelienople	Borough	3,812
7	Slippery Rock	Borough	3,625
8	Fox Run (former CDP)	CDP	3,282
9	Seven Fields	Borough	2,887
10	Meadowood	CDP	2,693
11	Oak Hills	CDP	2,333
12	Slippery Rock University	CDP	1,898
13	Evans City	Borough	1,833
14	Mars	Borough	1,699
15	Saxonburg	Borough	1,525
16	Nixon	CDP	1,373
17	Prospect	Borough	1,169
18	Chicora	Borough	1,043
19	Unionville	CDP	962
20	Harrisville	Borough	897
21	Harmony	Borough	890
22	East Butler	Borough	732
23	Lake Arthur Estates	CDP	594
24	Valencia	Borough	551
25	Connoquenessing	Borough	528
26	Bruin	Borough	524
27	Callery	Borough	394
28	West Liberty	Borough	343
29	Eau Claire	Borough	316
30	Portersville	Borough	235
31	Petrolia	Borough	212
32	Karns City	Borough	209
33	Fairview	Borough	198
34	West Sunbury	Borough	192
35	Cherry Valley	Borough	66

== In popular culture ==
Butler County has often been used as a setting for films and series shot in the North Pittsburgh area. Such films include:

- Night of the Living Dead (1968)
- The Crazies (1973)
- The Prince of Pennsylvania (1988)
- Iron Maze (1991)
- Kingpin (1996)
- The Haunting Hour Volume One: Don't Think About It (2007)
- Homecoming (2008)
- Staunton Hill (2008)
- The Road (2008)
- I Am Number Four (2011)
- Death from Above (2011)
- The Avengers (2012)
- A Separate Life (2012)
- Foxcatcher (2013)

Films/series filmed recently in Butler, but unreleased (as of April 2026):

- Parallax (Unreleased)

Films set in Butler County, but not necessarily filmed there:

- Mrs. Soffel (1984)
- Night of the Living Dead (1990)
- Snow Angels (2008)

Novels set in Butler County:

- Benjamin's Field, a trilogy by local author J. J. Knights
- The Pennsic War, an annual medieval camping event by the Society for Creative Anachronism, is fought in Butler County. Its site becomes the fourth most populous place in the county for a few weeks each year.

Video games set in Butler County:

- The Roottrees are Dead, a mystery video game by Jeremy Johnston, is primarily set in Butler County, Pennsylvania, home to the eponymous Roottree family and the headquarters of its candy corporation.

== See also ==
- National Register of Historic Places listings in Butler County, Pennsylvania
