= Chicora, Pennsylvania =

Borough in Pennsylvania, US

- Borough
- Borough of Chicora
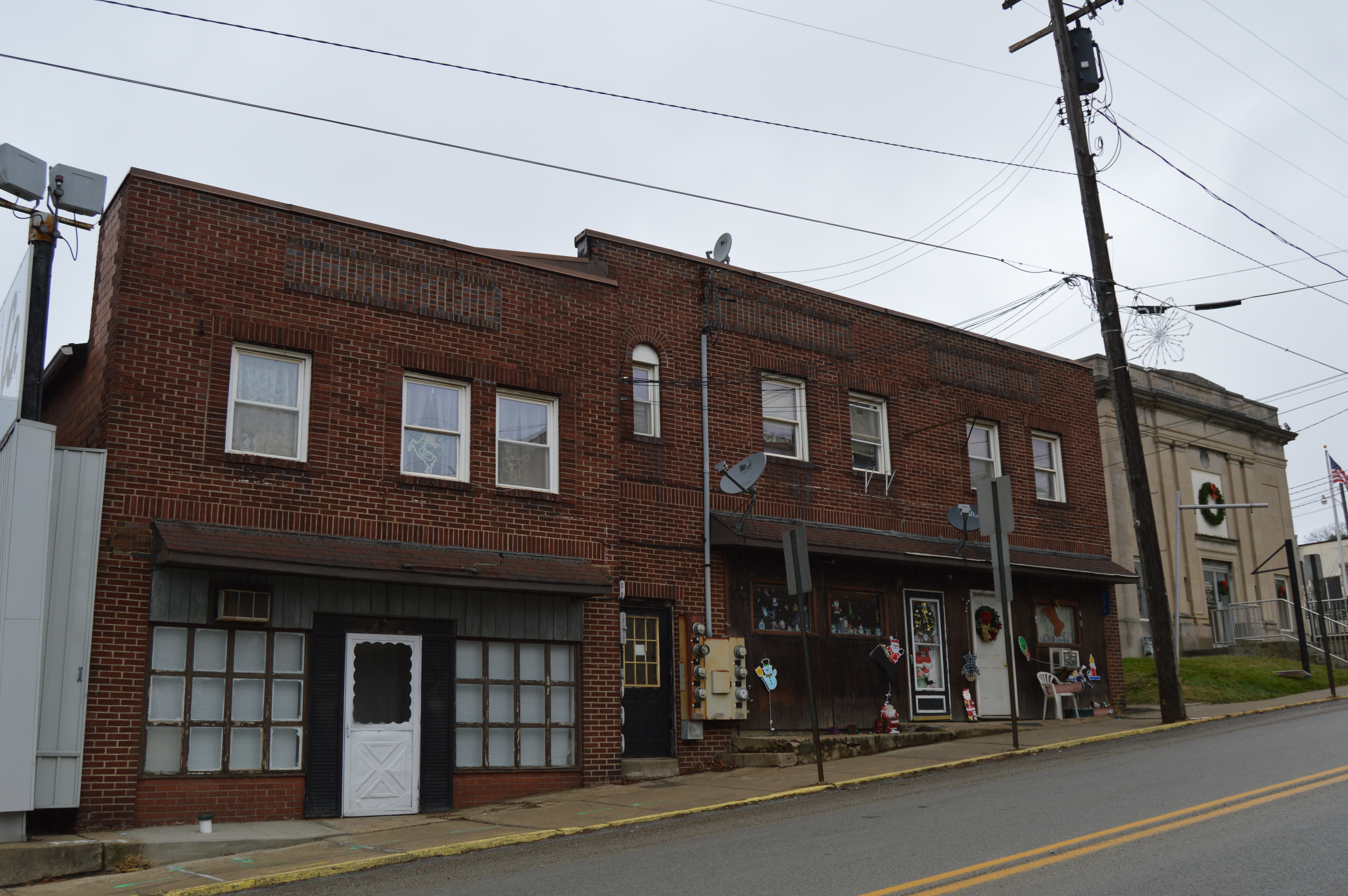
- Main Street commercial district

- Location of Chicora in Butler County, Pennsylvania.

- Location of Pennsylvania in the United States
- Coordinates: 40°56′58″N 79°44′33″W
- Country: United States
- State: Pennsylvania
- County: Butler County
- Settled: 1830
- Incorporated: 1855

Area
  - Total: 0.54 sq mi (1.39 km^{2})
  - Land: 0.53 sq mi (1.38 km^{2})
  - Water: 0 sq mi (0.00 km^{2})

Population (2020)
  - Total: 916
  - Density: 1,717.8/sq mi (663.25/km^{2})
- Time zone: UTC-5 (EST)
  - Summer (DST): UTC-4 (EDT)
- ZIP code: 16025
- Area code: 724
- FIPS code: 42-13440
- School District: Karns City Area School District
- Website: http://www.chicorapa.org/

Chicora is a borough in Butler County, Pennsylvania, United States. As of the 2020 census, Chicora had a population of 916.

== Geography ==
Chicora is located at 40°56′58″N 79°44′33″W (40.949468, −79.742631), along the upper reaches of Buffalo Creek. Pennsylvania Route 68 passes through the borough, leading east 9 miles (14 km) to East Brady on the Allegheny River and southwest 11 miles (18 km) to Butler, the county seat.

According to the United States Census Bureau, Chicora has a total area of 0.54 square miles (1.4 km^{2}), all land.

== Demographics ==
Historical population
Census	Pop.	Note	%±
1860	181		—
1870	207		14.4%
1880	1,108		435.3%
1890	1,162		4.9%
1900	950		−18.2%
1910	993		4.5%
1920	802		−19.2%
1930	1,052		31.2%
1940	987		−6.2%
1950	1,172		18.7%
1960	1,156		−1.4%
1970	1,166		0.9%
1980	1,192		2.2%
1990	1,058		−11.2%
2000	1,021		−3.5%
2010	1,043		2.2%
2020	916		−12.2%

At the 2000 census, there were 1,021 people, 419 households, and 287 families living in the borough. The population density was 1,841.9 inhabitants per square mile (711.2/km^{2}). There were 463 housing units at an average density of 835.3 per square mile (322.5/km^{2}). The racial makeup of the borough was 99.51% White, 0.20% African American and 0.29% Native American.

There were 419 households, 30.8% had children under the age of 18 living with them, 56.3% were married couples living together, 8.6% had a female householder with no husband present, and 31.3% were non-families. 29.4% of households were made up of individuals, and 15.0% were one person aged 65 or older. The average household size was 2.43 and the average family size was 3.02.

The age distribution was 26.5% under the age of 18, 4.2% from 18 to 24, 27.5% from 25 to 44, 24.8% from 45 to 64, and 16.9% 65 or older. The median age was 38 years. For every 100 females there were 87.0 males. For every 100 females age 18 and over, there were 86.1 males.

The median household income was $33,000 and the median family income was $39,375. Men had a median income of $32,143 versus $21,875 for women. The per capita income for the borough was $17,815. About 3.5% of families and 7.0% of the population were below the poverty line, including 7.4% of those under age 18 and 8.8% of those age 65 or over.

== Education ==
- Karns City Area School District – public school
- Karns City High School

== Chicora meteor ==
On June 24, 1938, a meteorite fell in the vicinity of Chicora. Named the "Chicora Meteor", the 450-tonne (500-short-ton) meteorite exploded approximately 12 miles (19 km) above the Earth's surface. Only two fragments of the meteorite were found following initial investigations. They had masses of 242 g (8.5 oz) and 61 g (2.2 oz), and were discovered some miles (some kilometers) short of the calculated point of impact of the main mass – which is yet to be found. Two more small fragments were found nearby in 1940.

Numerous reports of the Chicora meteor mention that a cow was struck and injured by a falling stone; other accounts say that the cow was killed by the stone.

The meteor was an olivine-hypersthene chondrite. Its remains are at the Smithsonian Institution.

The sound and light of the exploding meteor were initially mistaken for an explosion in the powder magazine at West Winfield, and was described by investigators F. W. Preston, E. P. Henderson and James R. Randolph as comparable in destructive power to the Halifax Explosion of 1917. "If it had landed on Pittsburgh there would have been few survivors," they stated.
