= Clintonville =

Clintonville may refer to:

== Places and locations in the United States ==
- Clintonville (Columbus, Ohio)
- Clintonville, Pennsylvania
- Clintonville, West Virginia
- Clintonville, Wisconsin
  - Clintonville Municipal Airport
