= Moniteau School District =

School district in Pennsylvania

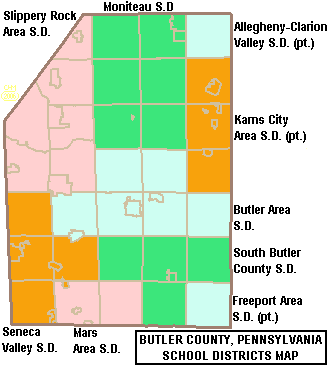

Address
- 1810 W Sunbury Road West Sunbury, Butler County, Pennsylvania, 16061; United States

District information
- Type: Public

Other information
- Website: www.moniteau.org

Moniteau School District is a small rural public school district in Butler County, Pennsylvania, Located on PA 308. The boroughs of Cherry Valley and Eau Claire, and West Sunbury, as well as the townships of Venango, Marion, Cherry, Washington, Concord, and Clay are within district boundaries. Moniteau School District encompasses approximately 152 square miles (390 km^{2}). According to 2010 federal census data, the resident population grew to 9,285 people. In 2000, the US Census Bureau reported the district served a resident population of 9,186. The educational attainment levels for the population 25 and over were 87.4% high school graduates and 12.0% college graduates. Moniteau School District is one of 9 full or partial public school districts operating in Butler County and one of 500 public school districts of Pennsylvania.

In 2009, Moniteau School District residents’ per capita income was $15,848, while the median family income was $39,904. In the Commonwealth, the median family income was $49,501 and the United States median family income was $49,445, in 2010. By 2013, the median household income in the United States rose to $52,100.

The district operates two schools: Moniteau Junior Senior High School (7th-12th) located at 1810 W. Sunbury Rd. West Sunbury, PA 16061 and Dassa Mckinney Elementary School (K-6th) located at 391 Hooker Road West Sunbury, PA 16061.

High school students may choose to attend Butler County Area Vocational Technical School for training in the culinary arts, cosmetology, construction and mechanical trades. The Midwestern Intermediate Unit MIU4 provides the district with a wide variety of services like specialized education for disabled students and hearing, speech and visual disability services and professional development for staff and faculty.

== Governance ==
Moniteau School

== Extracurriculars ==
The district offers a wide variety of clubs, activities and an extensive, publicly funded sports program.

=== Sports ===
The district funds:

Varsity

Boys

- Baseball - AA
- Basketball - AA
- Cross country - AA
- Football - AA
- Golf - AA
- Track and field - AA

Girls

- Basketball - AA
- Cross country - A
- Golf - AA
- Softball - AA
- Track and field - AA
- Volleyball - A

Junior high middle school sports

Boys

- Baseball
- Basketball
- Cross country
- Football
- Soccer
- Track and field
- Wrestling

Girls

- Basketball
- Cross country
- Field hockey
- Softball
- Track and field
- Volleyball

According to PIAA directory July 2014
