= Pennsylvania Route 138 =

State highway in Butler County, Pennsylvania, US

Pennsylvania Route 138

Route information
- Maintained by PennDOT
- Length: 10.618 mi (17.088 km)
- Existed: 1928–present

Major junctions
- South end: PA 8 near West Liberty
- PA 308 in West Sunbury
- North end: PA 38 in North Washington

Location
- Country: United States
- State: Pennsylvania
- Counties: Butler

Highway system
- Pennsylvania State Route System; Interstate; US; State; Scenic; Legislative
← PA 137	→ PA 139

Pennsylvania Route 138 (PA 138) is a 10.6-mile-long (17.1 km) state highway located in Butler County, Pennsylvania. The southern terminus is at PA 8 near West Liberty. The northern terminus is at PA 38 in North Washington.

== Route description ==
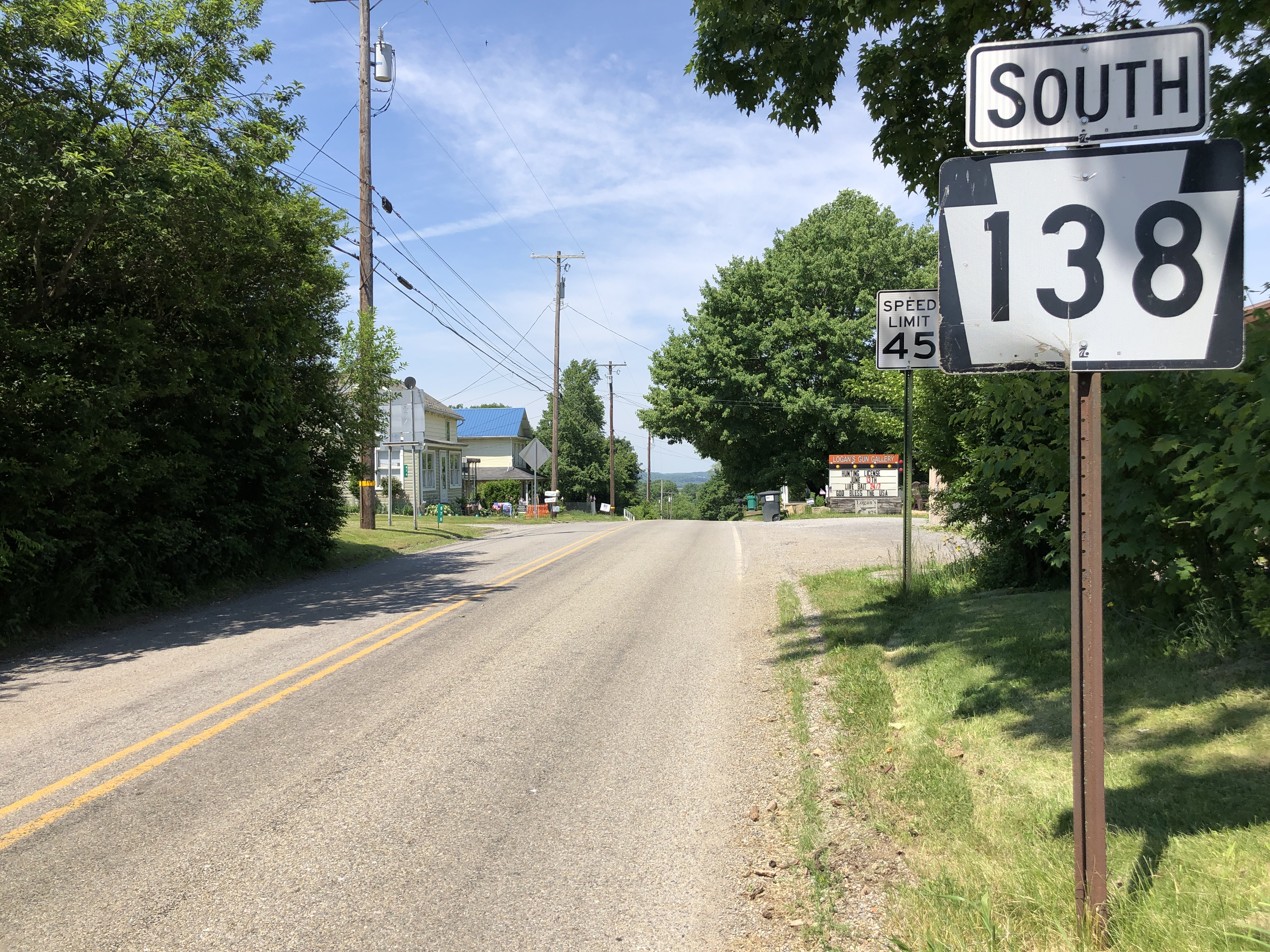
PA 138 southbound past PA 38 in North Washington

PA 138 begins at an intersection with PA 8 in Clay Township, heading to the northeast on two-lane undivided Euclid Road. The road heads through a mix of farmland and woodland with some homes, reaching the residential community of Euclid. Here, the route passes over the Canadian National's Bessemer Subdivision railroad line and turns east into forested areas with a few residences. PA 138 heads northeast again and enters more agricultural surroundings as it reaches an intersection with PA 308. At this point, PA 138 turns north to form a concurrency with PA 308 on Main Street, heading into the borough of West Sunbury. In this town, the road passes homes. Back into Clay Township, PA 138 splits from PA 308 by heading northeast onto North Washington Road. The road heads through a mix of farms and woods, passing through Concord Township before continuing into Washington Township. PA 138 enters open farmland before reaching its eastern terminus at PA 38 in the residential community of North Washington.

== Major intersections ==
The entire route is in Butler County.

Location	mi	km	Destinations	Notes
Clay Township	0.000	0.000	PA 8 (William Flinn Highway) – Butler, Franklin	Southern terminus
Clay Township	4.696	7.557	PA 308 south (West Sunbury Road)	Southern terminus of concurrency
Clay Township	5.281	8.499	PA 308 north (West Sunbury Road)	Northern terminus of concurrency
Washington Township	10.618	17.088	PA 38 (Oneida Valley Road) – Butler, Eau Claire	Northern terminus
1.000 mi = 1.609 km; 1.000 km = 0.621 mi: Concurrency terminus
