= Pennsylvania Route 308 =

State highway in Pennsylvania, US

Pennsylvania Route 308

Route information
- Maintained by PennDOT
- Length: 28.5 mi (45.9 km)

Major junctions
- South end: PA 8 near Butler
- PA 138 in West Sunbury; PA 58 in Marion Township; I-80 in Clinton Township; PA 208 in Clintonville; PA 8 in Irwin Township
- North end: SR 3013 in Irwin Township

Location
- Country: United States
- State: Pennsylvania
- Counties: Butler, Venango

Highway system
- Pennsylvania State Route System; Interstate; US; State; Scenic; Legislative
← PA 307	→ PA 309

Pennsylvania Route 308 (PA 308) is a 28.5-mile-long (45.9 km) state highway located in Butler and Venango Counties in Pennsylvania. The southern terminus is at PA 8 near Butler. The northern terminus is at State Route 3013 (SR 3013) north of an interchange with the PA 8 expressway in Pearl.

== Route description ==
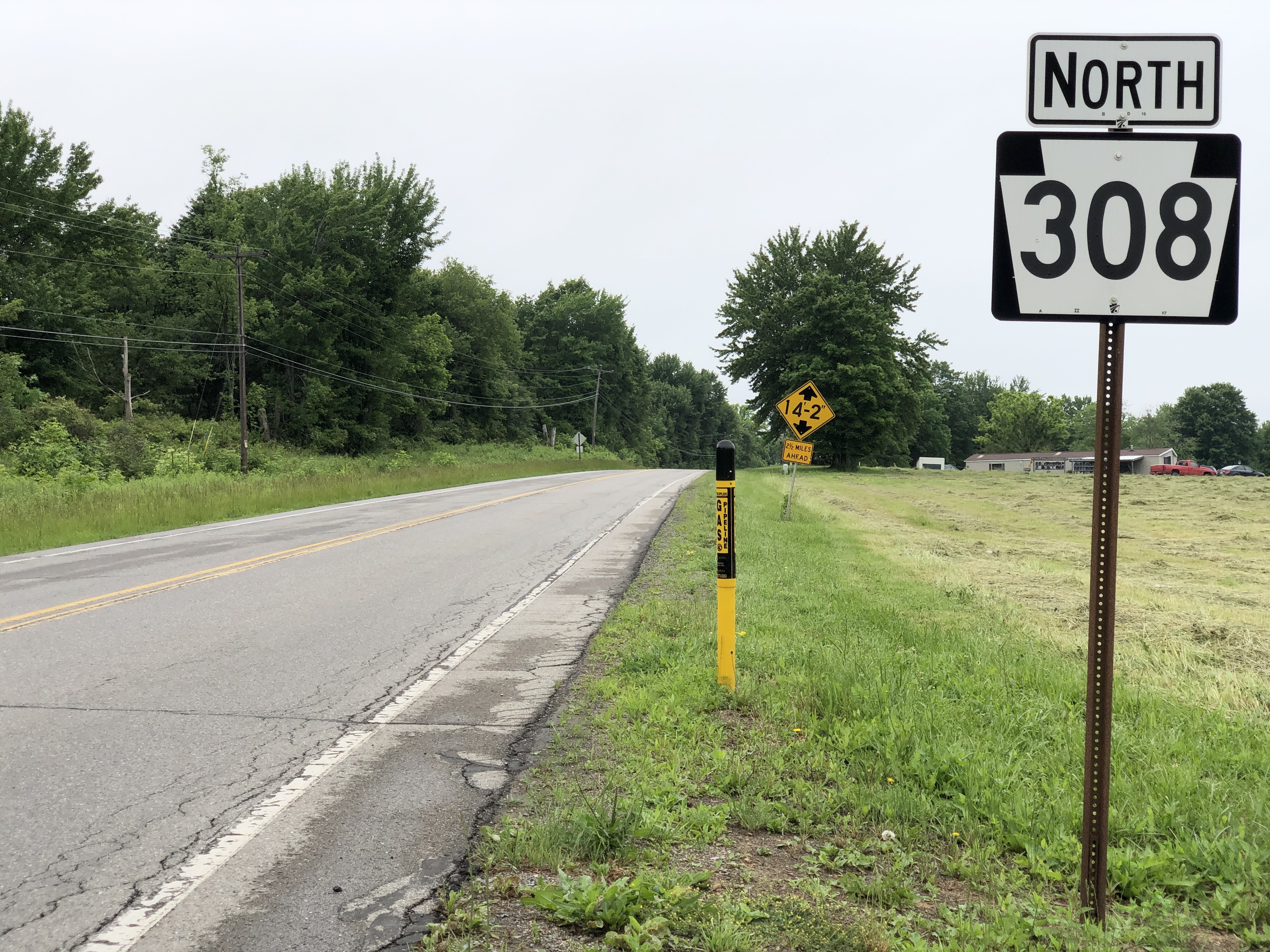
PA 308 northbound in Clinton Township

PA 308 begins at an intersection with PA 8 near the Clearview Mall in Center Township, Butler County, heading north on two-lane undivided West Sunbury Road. The road passes residential developments in the community of Windward Heights before heading into wooded areas with some farm fields and homes. The route passes over the Canadian National's Bessemer Subdivision railroad line and continues into agricultural areas with some woods and residences, crossing into Clay Township. PA 308 runs through more farmland and woodland with some homes, reaching an intersection with PA 138. At this point, PA 138 turns north to form a concurrency with PA 308 on Main Street, heading into the borough of West Sunbury. In this town, the road passes homes. Back into Clay Township, PA 138 splits from PA 308 by heading northeast onto North Washington Road. The route continues north on West Sunbury Road and runs through more woodland with some fields and homes. The road enters Cherry Township and continues through more rural areas, passing through Five Points, Moniteau, and Annandale. PA 308 crosses into Marion Township and heads through the residential community of Boyers before running through more wooded areas with a few fields and homes. The road comes to an intersection with PA 58 in Murrinsville and continues through farmland and woodland, curving northeast and heading into Venango Township.

PA 308 enters Clinton Township in Venango County and becomes Butler Street, heading north through a mix of farms and woods with some homes and passing through Smith Corners. The route comes to an interchange with I-80 and heads into the borough of Clintonville, curving to the north-northwest and passing homes. In the center of town, the road crosses PA 208 and becomes Franklin Street, turning north through more residential areas. PA 308 heads into wooded areas with some homes and turns northwest, crossing back into Clinton Township. The route curves north and becomes an unnamed road, passing through more rural areas. The road heads into areas of woods and farm fields as it comes to Bullion and turns northwest. The route continues into Irwin Township and runs through more rural areas, coming to an interchange with the PA 8 freeway. PA 308 continues a short distance ahead to its terminus at SR 3013, a two-lane road that is the former route of PA 8.

== Major intersections ==
County	Location	mi	km	Destinations	Notes
Butler	Center Township	0.000	0.000	PA 8 – Butler, Franklin	Southern terminus
Butler	Clay Township	7.612	12.250	PA 138 west (Euclid Road)	Southern end of concurrency with PA 138
Butler	Clay Township	8.197	13.192	PA 138 east (North Washington Road) – North Washington	Northern end of concurrency with PA 138
Butler	Marion Township	18.127	29.173	PA 58 (Eau Claire Road) – Eau Claire, Harrisville	
Venango	Clinton Township	21.744	34.994	I-80 – Clarion, Sharon	Exit 35 on I-80
Venango	Clintonville	22.469	36.160	PA 208 – Emlenton, Barkeyville	
Venango	Irwin Township	28.223– 28.247	45.421– 45.459	PA 8 – Franklin, Butler	Interchange
Venango	Irwin Township	28.478	45.831	SR 3013 (Old Route 8)	Northern terminus
1.000 mi = 1.609 km; 1.000 km = 0.621 mi: Concurrency terminus
