= Concord Township, Pennsylvania =

Concord Township is the name of some places in the U.S. state of Pennsylvania:

- Concord Township, Butler County, Pennsylvania
- Concord Township, Delaware County, Pennsylvania
- Concord Township, Erie County, Pennsylvania
