= Rica Comstock =

American professional golfer (born (1947)

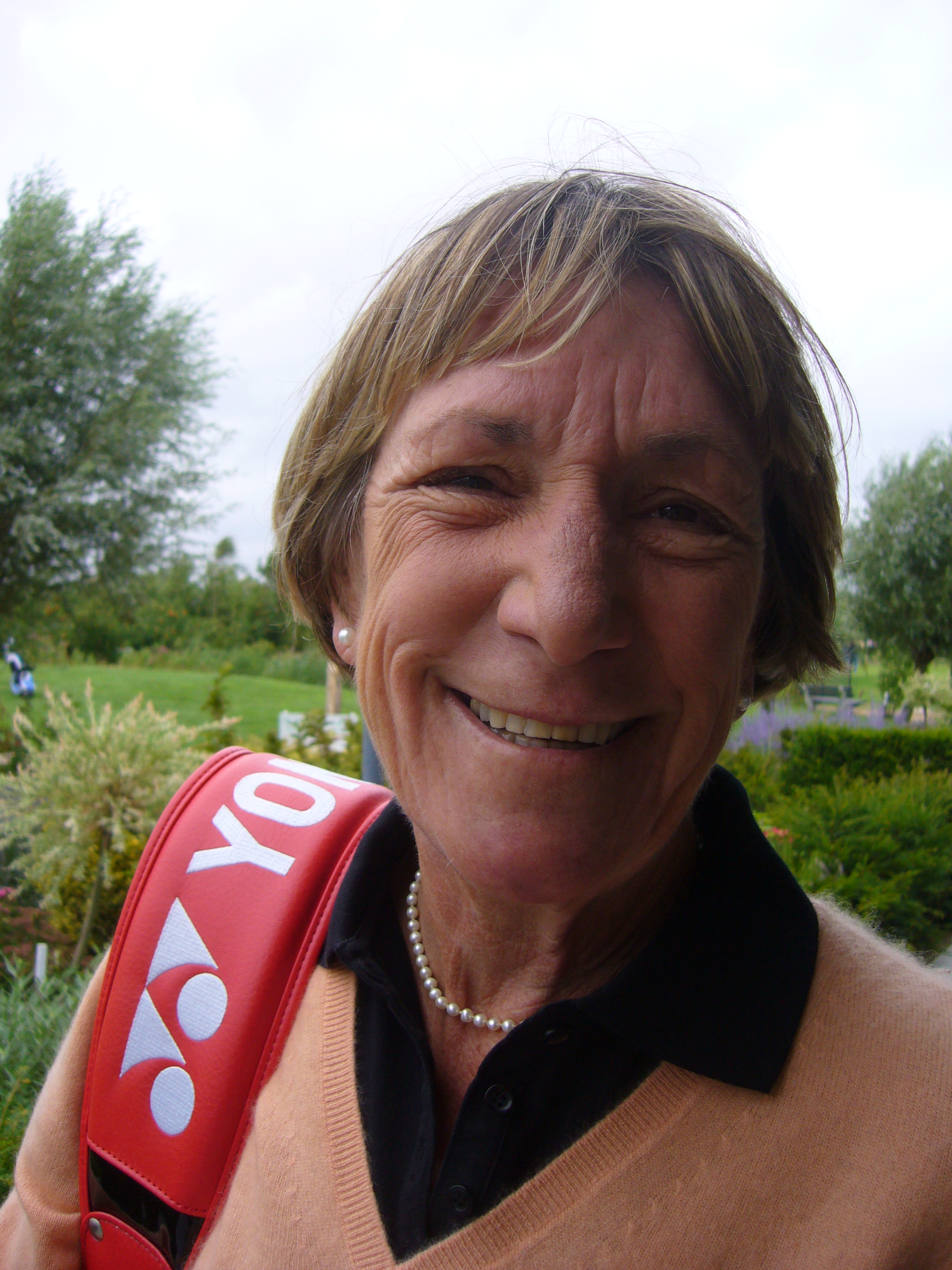
- Comstock in 2008

Personal information
- Full name: Rica J. Comstock
- Nationality: United States
- Born: August 20, 1947 (age 79) Essex, Connecticut, U.S.

Career
- Sport: Golf
- Former tours: LPGA Tour (1982–83); Ladies European Tour (1984–1996)
- Professional wins: 3

Number of wins by tour
- Ladies European Tour: 1
- Other: 2

Best results in LPGA major championships
- Chevron Championship: DNP
- Women's PGA C'ship: CUT: 1983
- U.S. Women's Open: CUT: 1982
- du Maurier Classic: CUT: 1983

Rica J. Comstock (born August 20, 1947) is a retired American professional golfer who played on the LPGA Tour and Ladies European Tour.

== Early life and amateur career ==
Comstock was raised as one of three siblings in Essex, Connecticut, the daughter of Frances Brooks Comstock and Samuel Morris Comstock. She was inspired to play golf by her mother, who was club champion at the Old Lyme Country Club and Black Hall Country Club many times.

As a teenager, Comstock was in contention at the 1976 Connecticut State Women's Amateur Open Championship, held in Hartford.

== Professional career ==
Comstock joined the LPGA Tour in 1982. She also qualified for the 1982 U.S. Women's Open at Del Paso Country Club in Sacramento, California.

Comstock joined the Ladies European Tour in 1984, and won the McEwan's Lager Manchester Classic in England. She stayed on the tour for 12 years and last played a full schedule in 1995, when she finished 93rd in the LET Order of Merit. After only four LET starts in 1996, she retired to become a teaching pro. She settled in the Netherlands in 1996, to teach at Golfclub Grevelingenhout.

In 2002 and 2008, she won the Simone Thion de la Chaume Trophy, an international senior women's open organized by Catherine Lacoste at the Chantaco Golf Club in Saint-Jean-de-Luz, named after French amateur golfer Simone Thion de la Chaume.

== Professional wins (3) ==
=== Ladies European Tour (1) ===
No.	Date	Tournament	Winning score	Margin of victory	Runner-up
1	3 Jun 1984	McEwan's Lager Manchester Classic	+2 (73-68-72-73=286)	1 stroke	(England) Debbie Dowling

=== Other wins (2) ===
- 2002 Simone Thion de la Chaume Trophy
- 2008 Simone Thion de la Chaume Trophy
