= Janet Anderson (golfer) =

American professional golfer (born 1956)

Personal information
- Nationality: United States
- Born: March 10, 1956 (age 70) West Sunbury, Pennsylvania, U.S.
- Height: 5 ft 6 in (1.68 m)

Career
- Sport: Golf
- College: Slippery Rock State College
- Turned professional: 1978
- Former tour: LPGA Tour (1978–1997)
- Professional wins: 1

Number of wins by tour
- LPGA Tour: 1

Best results in LPGA major championships (wins: 1)
- Chevron Championship: T23: 1980
- Women's PGA C'ship: T3: 1982
- U.S. Women's Open: Won: 1982
- du Maurier Classic: T12: 1980

Janet Anderson (born March 10, 1956) is an American professional golfer.

== Career ==
Anderson was born in West Sunbury, Pennsylvania, United States. She attended Slippery Rock State College. Her rookie year on the LPGA Tour was 1978. She achieved her only LPGA Tour victory in 1982 at one of the LPGA majors, the 1982 U.S. Women's Open. She also had her highest finish on the money list that year, placing 13th. Her last season on the tour was 1997.

== Personal life ==
Prior to her divorce in January 1983, Anderson played using her married name Janet Alex.

== Professional wins ==
=== LPGA Tour wins (1) ===
Legend
LPGA Tour major championships (1)
Other LPGA Tour (0)

No.	Date	Tournament	Winning score	Margin of victory	Runners-up
1	Jul 25, 1982	U.S. Women's Open	−5 (70-73-72-68=283)	6 strokes	(United States) JoAnne Carner, (United States) Beth Daniel, (United States) Sandra Haynie, (United States) Donna White

== Major championships ==
=== Wins (1) ===
Year	Championship	Winning score	Margin	Runners-up
1982	U.S. Women's Open	−5 (70-73-72-68=283)	6 strokes	(United States) JoAnne Carner, (United States) Beth Daniel, (United States) Sandra Haynie, (United States) Donna White
