= Bob Glenn =

American baseball player (1894–1977)

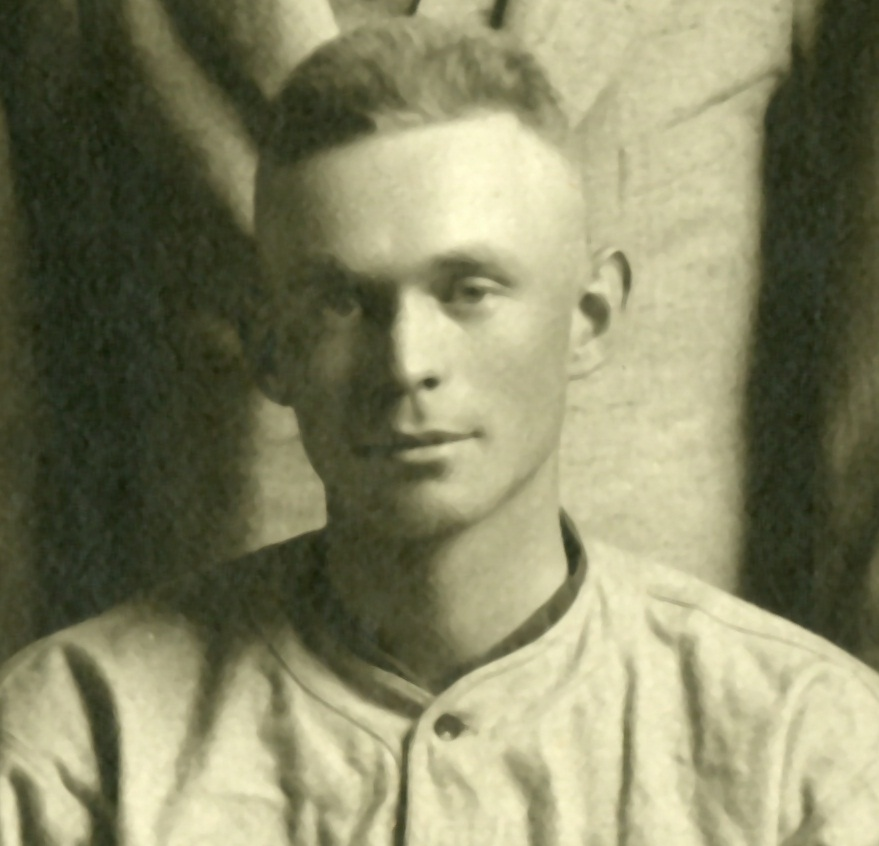
- Glenn at Michigan, 1918
- Pitcher
- Born: June 16, 1894; West Sunbury, Pennsylvania
- Died: June 3, 1977 (aged 82); Richmond, California
- Batted: Right Threw: Right

MLB debut
- July 27, 1920, for the St. Louis Cardinals

Last MLB appearance
- August 17, 1920, for the St. Louis Cardinals

MLB statistics
- Games played: 2
- Innings pitched: 2
- Earned runs: 0
- Stats at Baseball Reference

Teams
- St. Louis Cardinals (1920)

Burdette "Bob" Glenn (June 16, 1894 – June 3, 1977) was an American baseball player and pioneer in the field of highway engineering.

Glenn played college baseball at the University of Michigan in 1917 and 1918 and appeared in two games as a pitcher for the St. Louis Cardinals in 1920, compiling a career earned run average of 0.00 in Major League Baseball.

Glenn later was later employed as an instructor and professor of civil and highway engineering at Oregon State University for over 25 years. In the late 1940s, he became one of the earlier staff members at the Institute of Transportation and Traffic Engineering at the University of California, Berkeley, where he remained until his retirement in the 1960s.

== Early years ==
Glenn was born in West Sunbury, Pennsylvania, in 1894. His parents were Horace Glenn and Ida Glenn. At the time of the 1910 U.S. Census, Glenn was living in Washington Township, Pennsylvania, with his parents and two older sisters. His father was employed as a general farmer. He later listed his home town as Tarentum, Pennsylvania. Glenn began his college education at Grove City College and was one of the founders of the Adelphikos fraternity.

== University of Michigan ==
Glenn attended the University of Michigan and received a Bachelor of Science degree in civil engineering. He also served as an instructor in surveying at Michigan from 1918 to 1919.

While attending Michigan, Glenn played college baseball for the Michigan Wolverines baseball team in 1917 and 1918 and was the captain of the 1918 team. While attending Michigan, he was also a member of the Lambda Chi Alpha fraternity, Griffins, Vulcans, Webb and Flange, Round-Up Club, and Keystone Club.

== Professional baseball ==
Glenn signed with the St. Louis Cardinals. In April 1920, the Milwaukee baseball club announced that it had purchased Glenn from the Cardinals. Glenn either remained with or returned to the Cardinals in 1920. He appeared in two Major League Baseball games for the Cardinals on July 27, 1920, and August 17, 1920. Both appearances were as a relief pitcher. Glenn pitched two innings, allowed two hits and no runs, and compiled a career earned run average of 0.00. He had no at bats.

== Highway engineering career ==
In 1919, after graduating from Michigan, Glenn was hired as an instructor in civil engineering at the Engineering School of the Oregon State Agricultural College (now known as Oregon State University) in Corvallis, Oregon. From 1922 to 1934, Glenn was an assistant professor of civil engineering at Oregon State. In 1934, Glenn became an associate professor, and in 1936, he was listed as an associate professor in the field of "highway engineering" at Oregon State. While at Oregon State, Glenn's publications included "Highway and Traffic Engineering Literature: A Classified Bibliography of Periodical Literature Covering the Period 1920-1939" (1940) and "A Report on the Efficiency of the Present Highway Systems as it Affects the Logging Industry" (1947).

In the late 1940s, Glenn left Oregon State to become one of the earlier staff members at the Institute of Transportation and Traffic Engineering ("ITTE") at the University of California, Berkeley. While associated with the ITTE, Glenn's publications included "Working for Progress in Highway Engineering" (1954), "County Road Organization and Administration in California" (1955), and "An Inventory of Traffic Engineering Activities in California Cities" (1959).

== Family and later years ==
In June 1922, Glenn was married to Evelyn Fulkerson in Benton County, Oregon.

In June 1977, Glenn died in Richmond, California, at age 82.
