= J. Elmer Lehr =

American politician

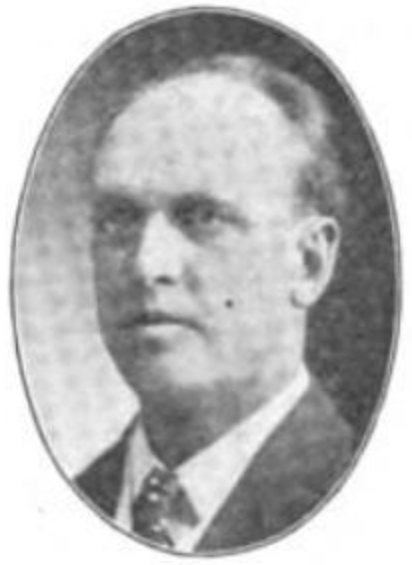
- Lehr in the 1909 Wisconsin Blue Book

Member of the Wisconsin Senate from the 18th district
- In office January 4, 1909 – March 18, 1912
- Preceded by: Fred M. Wilcox
- Succeeded by: Henry N. Culbertson

Personal details
- Born: Joseph Elmer Lehr; December 26, 1868 Marengo Township, Michigan
- Died: January 6, 1958 (aged 89) Milwaukee, Wisconsin
- Party: Republican
- Spouse: Emma Alvina Groth (m. 1904)
- Occupation: lawyer, politician

Joseph Elmer Lehr (December 26, 1868 - January 6, 1958) was an American lawyer and Republican politician. He was a member of the Wisconsin State Senate, representing Outagamie and Shawano counties, from 1909 until his removal from office in 1912. Lehr was disqualified after he moved his primary residence from the district he represented.

== Biography ==
Lehr was born on December 26, 1868, in Marengo Township, Michigan. He graduated from the Illinois College of Law. In 1895, he moved to Clintonville, Wisconsin. He moved to Appleton, Wisconsin, in 1901. Lehr married Emma Alvina Groth in 1907.

== Career ==
Lehr was a member of the Wisconsin Senate from 1909 to 1912. Previously, he was City Attorney of Clintonville and Chairman of the Outagamie County, Wisconsin Republican Party.

=== Residency controversy ===
Early in the 1911–1912 session of the Legislature, Lehr formed a law partnership with W. B. Rubin, opened an office in Milwaukee, and moved his furniture and property to that city. Lehr insisted he would continue to visit Appleton once a week and would continue to represent Outagamie County in the Senate, but he was not present at a roll call of the Legislature after January 31, 1911. In March 1912, Lehr accepted an appointment as assistant district attorney in Milwaukee County, and the State Attorney General, Levi H. Bancroft, then officially ruled that the seat was vacant. Governor Francis E. McGovern called a special election for April to fill the vacancy.

== Later life ==
Lehr died on January 6, 1958, in Milwaukee, Wisconsin.
