= Brice Schwab =

American football player (born 1990)

Profile
- Position: Offensive tackle

Personal information
- Born: March 27, 1990 (age 36); West Sunbury, Pennsylvania, U.S.
- Listed height: 6 ft 7 in (2.01 m)
- Listed weight: 302 lb (137 kg)

Career information
- College: Arizona State
- NFL draft: 2013: undrafted

Career history
- Tampa Bay Buccaneers (2013)*; New England Patriots (2013); Houston Texans (2014)*
- * Offseason or practice squad member only

Brice Schwab (born March 27, 1990) is an American former professional football offensive lineman in the National Football League (NFL). Schwab played college football at Arizona State.

== College career ==
Schwab played college football at Arizona State. Schwab also played for Palomar Junior College in San Marcos, California.

== Professional career ==
=== Tampa Bay Buccaneers ===
On April 29, 2013, Schwab was signed as an undrafted free agent by the Tampa Bay Buccaneers. On July 31, 2013, Schwab was waived by the Tampa Bay Buccaneers.

=== New England Patriots ===
On August 2, 2013, Schwab was signed by the New England Patriots. He was released by the Patriots on August 28, 2013.
