= Murrinsville, Pennsylvania =

Unincorporated community in Pennsylvania, U.S.

Coordinates: 41.143°N 79.884°W

Murrinsville is an unincorporated community located in Marion Township, Butler County, Pennsylvania, United States, at the intersection of state routes 58 and 308.

Murrinsville was surveyed in 1828 for 'Squire John MURRIN on the western slope of the Allegheny-Beaver divide, at a point 1,440 feet (440 meters) above ocean level, near the eastern line of the township. On December 19, 1828, the owner advertised a sale of lots, which took place in January 1829.

At the crossroads of Murrinsville is St. Alphonsus Roman Catholic Church, founded in 1841. The parish was the outgrowth of Irish immigration to the area, beginning in 1796. Among the Catholic immigrants was Hugh Murrin, for whom the town was named. For some 40 years, the small community was occasionally visited by priests either passing through the area or stationed at Sugar Creek, Butler or Pittsburgh. Until 1841, Mass was held in the home of Hugh Murrin. Eventually, the congregation grew to the point that a church was needed. On August 23, 1841, a contract to build the church was drawn up and the completed church was dedicated on August 2, 1842. Until 1850, the church was attended from either Butler or Sugar Creek. In 1850, a resident pastor was assigned to the parish.

In December 1892, a fire destroyed the interior of the church. However, the stone walls of the building were still intact and after some debate, the congregation repaired the structure rather than tearing it down and building a new church. The renovated church was dedicated on December 2, 1893. This church continues to serve the community today.
