= Adelphikos =

American social collegiate fraternity

- αδελφικός
- Founded: 1913; 113 years ago Grove City College
- Type: Social
- Affiliation: Independent
- Status: Active
- Emphasis: Christianity
- Scope: Local
- Motto: "Men of honor, men of courage"
- Colors: Purple and Gold
- Mascot: Black cat
- Headquarters: 200 Campus Drive, Box #1398; Grove City, Pennsylvania 16127; United States
- Website: adelphikos.org

The Adelphikos (αδελφικός) is a social fraternity formed in 1913 at Grove City College in Grove City, Pennsylvania.

== History ==
Adelphikos was formed as an outgrowth of the two campus debate clubs, the Webster and the Shakespeare, where an intense rivalry inspired eight of the Webster men to invite two of their rivals to join in the formation of the fraternity, putting an end to the strife. Adelphikos' name is a coined, Greek-derived word, whose definition is known by its members.

From its beginning in 1913 when formed by ten members of the student body, it has flourished on the campus uninterrupted for over ten successive decades. Adelphikos was the second official (recognized) fraternity on campus and the first group to use Greek letters directly in its name, vying in a friendly rivalry for "first" with another of the campus' eighteen fraternities and sororities, the Pan Sophic.

=== 1974 tragedy ===
In 1974, seventeen Adelphikos pledges were walking back to campus from a fraternity event when a driver who had fallen asleep at the wheel plowed into them from behind. Four pledges - Thomas Morgan Elliott, John Curtin, Rudolph Mion, and Gary Gilliland - were killed. Today a memorial plaque to the four students sits on campus in front of Buhl Library. Although no alcohol was involved and the driver was deemed to be at fault, the incident triggered tightened control of fraternity practices and other student activities at the college. It remains one of the deadliest fraternity-related accidents in the United States.

In the aftermath of the pledge deaths, the fraternity experienced setbacks, struggling in the late 1970s, with members committing violations of campus rules that resulted in the loss of college recognition during the 1990s.

=== Reestablishment ===
Reemerging from this period in 2000, the fraternity was re-established as a Christian brotherhood.

Adelphikos is not affiliated with any national fraternal organization. It is an independent organization, like all other Grove City fraternities.

== Symbols ==
Adelphikos' name is a coined, Greek-derived word, whose definition is known by its members. The fraternity does not use a Greek letter acronym. Its motto is "Men of honor, men of courage". Its colors are purple and gold. Its mascot is the black cat.

== Notable members ==
- David M. Bailey, contemporary Christian musician
- Peter J. Boettke, economist at George Mason University, former president of the fraternity
- Bob Glenn, former professional baseball player, St. Louis Cardinals, and pioneer in the field of highway engineering
- Matt Kibbe, president and chief community officer of Free-The-People and former CEO of FreedomWorks

== See also ==
- List of social fraternities
