= Julius Spearbraker =

American politician

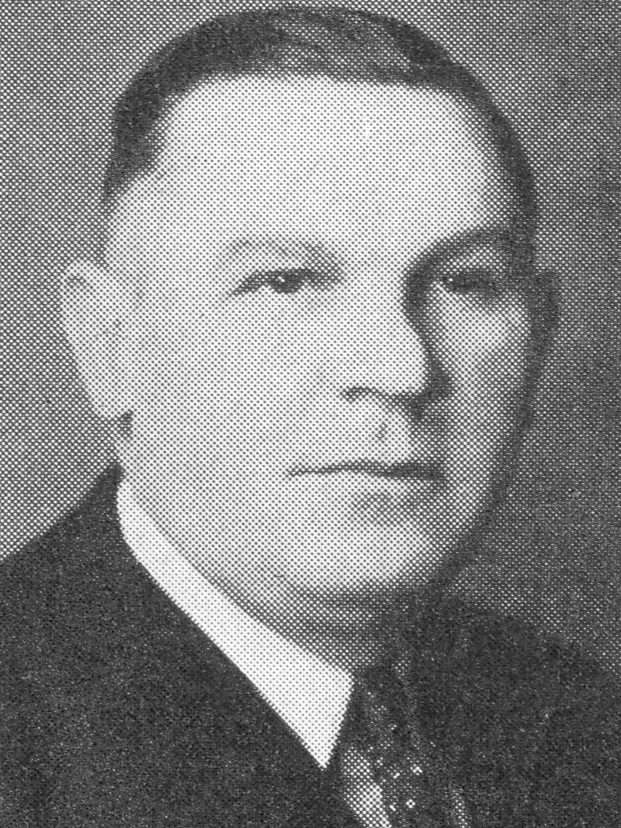
Spearbraker circa 1940

Julius Spearbraker was a member of the Wisconsin State Assembly.

== Biography ==
Spearbraker was born on September 8, 1886, in Clintonville, Wisconsin. He attended Marquette University. Spearbraker died in 1969.

== Career ==
Spearbraker was a member of the Assembly from 1939 to 1950. Previously, he had been Clerk of Clintonville from 1912 to 1934. Additionally, he was a delegate to the Republican National Convention in 1940 and 1944.
