= Pan Sophic =

Local social fraternity at Grove City College, Pennsylvania, U.S.

- PANS
- Founded: 1911; 115 years ago Grove City College
- Type: Social
- Affiliation: Independent
- Status: Active
- Scope: Local
- Motto: "Brotherhood, Love, and Loyalty"
- Colors: Blue and White
- Symbol: Griffin, the torch, the helmet, and the pan
- Mascot: Hog/Pig
- Chapters: 1
- Headquarters: Grove City, Pennsylvania 16127; United States
- Website: www.pansophicfraternity.com

Pan Sophic Fraternity (Pan Sophic, Pans) is a men's fraternity that was founded at Grove City College in the winter term of the 1911-1912 school year.

== History ==
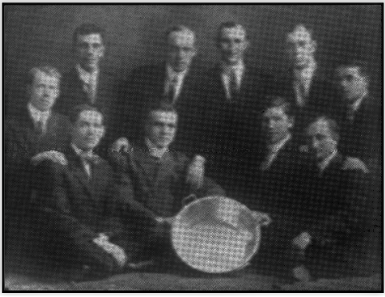
Pan Sophic Club members during their first year after formation.

The organization, established 35 years after the creation of the school itself, was formed during a period when Greek letter societies were banned in the autumn of 1911. At the time of its founding, there were only a few other organizations on campus: the Shakespeare Club (a debating society), the Webster Debating Society, and two girls' clubs. Paying students were obligated to sign a card stating they would not start or join a Greek letter group; hence the naming of the group as The Pansophics Club, a name inspired by a group of ancient Greek philosophers known as the Pansophists.

The ban ended in 1913 with the acceptance of Greek letter-named societies by then-President, Dr. Alexander T. Ormond. At this point, just two years after its sub rosa founding, the Pansophics were recognized as a fraternity. The group also dropped the plural 's' at the end of the Pan Sophics, and by 1915 dropped the word Club. The current name, Pan Sophic, was adopted for official use on campus. Pan Sophic was thus the first and oldest of Grove City College's fraternities, noted as early as 1913.

Pan Sophic, like other fraternities and sororities on the Grove City campus, is independent–a "local", unaffiliated with any national society or organization. While other local Greek Letter organizations were founded earlier in the Commonwealth of Pennsylvania, many of these merged into larger nationals. As such, Pan Sophic remains one of the oldest local fraternities in the United States and the oldest local fraternity in Pennsylvania.

The Pans have a friendly rivalry with another old society at Grove City, the Adelphikos fraternity. Adelphikos claims to be the first fraternal group to use Greek lettering, while the Pan Sophics, whose name is also derived from Greek language roots, was the first fraternity formed on the campus by about two years. Neither group exhibits a set of Greek letters as their name abbreviation.

== Symbols ==
The fraternity's colors are blue and white. Its mascot is the hog or pig. Its symbols are the griffin, the helmet, the pan (a large silver dish), and the torch.

The Pan Sophic crest includes a white shield with a chevron with three stars. The torch and helmet are above the chevron and the pan is below the chevron. A griffin is above the shield. The letters T and B are on either side of the shield; the meaning of these letters is known only to members. A banner that features the name of the fraternity is located below the shield.

Both the original crest, a simple black triangle with a pan and letters, and the current crest, exhibit the esoteric letters T and B, whose meaning is known to members.

The original Pan Sophic crest

Alumni of the society are known as the "Old Guard".

== Activities ==
In 1976, the Pans became known as the swimming fraternity when a majority of the college's swim team pledged. This era ended only after 2000. The connection sparked a continued association between the Pans and other campus sports participants, including members of the football team. Member Don Balla is cited as founding the Men's Lacrosse team in 1993.

== Philanthropy ==
In 1988, Pan Sophic sponsored a local racquetball tournament donating all proceeds to the Red Box Mission Fund.

In 2000 the fraternity adopted another community philanthropy by initiating Grove City College's annual participation in the American Cancer Society's local Relay for Life. This campus-wide event raises thousands of dollars annually by the participating groups and the Pans have partnered with other groups to organize the event.

The Pan Sophic honored a fallen brother, Brett Elsess, an Air Force veteran, with a tree dedicated to his memory and planted outside of the campus Physical Learning Center (PLC).

In 2012, the fraternity added support of the local youth and Little League football to its other charitable efforts. The members assist their Fraternity Advisor, Samuel S. Stanton, Jr., in mentoring and support of the Grove City Little Eagles.

== See also ==
- List of social fraternities and sororities
