= Frank J. Olmsted =

Government official in Wisconsin, US

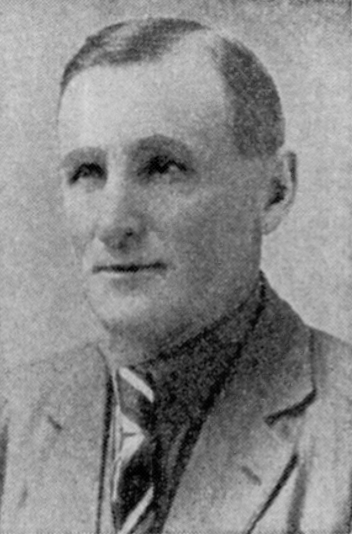

Member of the Wisconsin State Assembly
- In office 1919

Personal details
- Born: March 19, 1871 Clintonville, Wisconsin, US
- Died: March 24, 1958 (aged 87) Antigo, Wisconsin, US
- Party: Republican
- Occupation: Farmer, businessman, politician

Frank J. Olmsted (March 19, 1871 – March 24, 1958) was a member of the Wisconsin State Assembly.

== Biography ==
Olmsted was born on March 19, 1871, in Clintonville, Wisconsin. He became involved in farming and business and married Daisy Dean Merrill. Olmsted died in 1958.

== Political career ==
Olmsted was elected to the Assembly in 1918. Other positions he held include Chairman (similar to Mayor) of Elcho, Wisconsin from 1916 to 1918 and Assessor of Norwood, Wisconsin. He was a Republican.
