= Clintonville, Pennsylvania =

Borough in Pennsylvania, US

- Borough
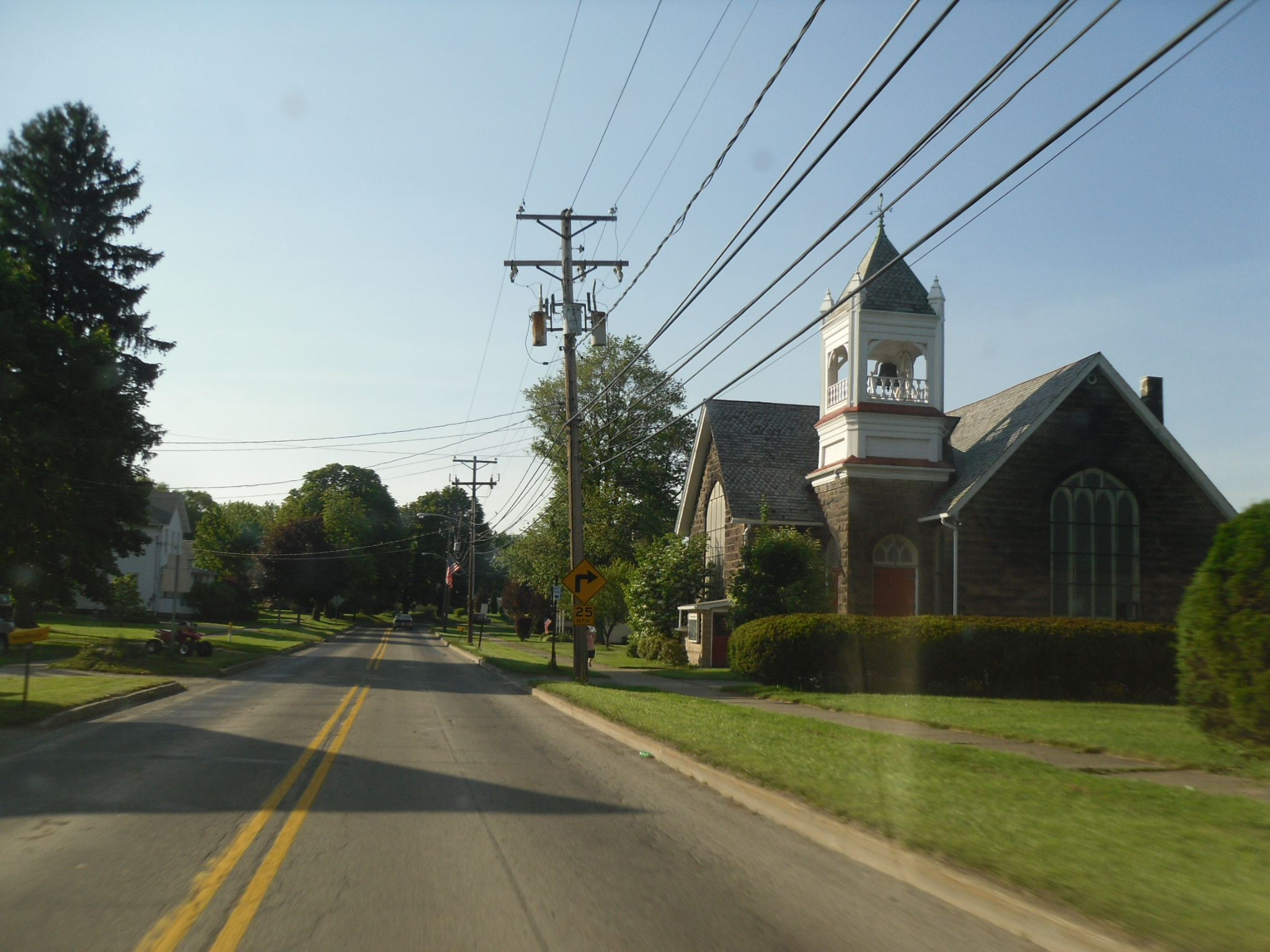
- Clintonville United Methodist Church along PA 308

- Location of Clintonville in Venango County, Pennsylvania.

- Location within Pennsylvania
- Coordinates: 41°11′58″N 79°52′28″W
- Country: United States
- State: Pennsylvania
- County: Venango
- Settled: 1833
- Incorporated: 1878

Government
  - Type: Borough Council

Area
  - Total: 1.09 sq mi (2.83 km^{2})
  - Land: 1.09 sq mi (2.83 km^{2})
  - Water: 0.0039 sq mi (0.01 km^{2})

Population (2020)
  - Total: 439
  - Density: 402.4/sq mi (155.36/km^{2})
- Time zone: UTC-5 (Eastern (EST))
  - Summer (DST): UTC-4 (EDT)
- Zip code: 16372
- Area code: 814
- FIPS code: 42-14376
- Website: https://clintonvilleboropa.com/

Clintonville is a borough in Venango County, Pennsylvania, United States. The population was 439 at the 2020 census.

== Geography ==
Clintonville is located at 41°11′58″N 79°52′28″W (41.199578, -79.874360).

According to the United States Census Bureau, the borough has a total area of 1.1 square miles (2.8 km^{2}), all land.

== Demographics ==
Historical population
Census	Pop.	Note	%±
1880	339		—
1890	253		−25.4%
1900	262		3.6%
1910	335		27.9%
1920	320		−4.5%
1930	354		10.6%
1940	329		−7.1%
1950	307		−6.7%
1960	311		1.3%
1970	321		3.2%
1980	512		59.5%
1990	520		1.6%
2000	528		1.5%
2010	508		−3.8%
2020	439		−13.6%
2021 (est.)	432	▼	−1.6%

As of the census of 2000, there were 528 people, 215 households, and 147 families residing in the borough. The population density was 463.5 inhabitants per square mile (179.0/km^{2}). There were 242 housing units at an average density of 212.4 per square mile (82.0/km^{2}). The racial makeup of the borough was 97.16% White, 1.52% African American, 0.57% Native American, 0.19% from other races, and 0.57% from two or more races. Hispanic or Latino of any race were 0.19% of the population.

There were 215 households, out of which 35.8% had children under the age of 18 living with them, 51.2% were married couples living together, 10.2% had a female householder with no husband present, and 31.6% were non-families. 27.4% of all households were made up of individuals, and 17.2% had someone living alone who was 65 years of age or older. The average household size was 2.46 and the average family size was 2.95.

In the borough the population was spread out, with 26.1% under the age of 18, 9.5% from 18 to 24, 27.5% from 25 to 44, 21.4% from 45 to 64, and 15.5% who were 65 years of age or older. The median age was 35 years. For every 100 females there were 97.8 males. For every 100 females age 18 and over, there were 90.2 males.

The median income for a household in the borough was $22,083, and the median income for a family was $29,135. Males had a median income of $23,667 versus $16,932 for females. The per capita income for the borough was $15,488. About 14.4% of families and 13.4% of the population were below the poverty line, including 16.4% of those under age 18 and 7.1% of those age 65 or over.
