= Clintonville, West Virginia =

Unincorporated community in West Virginia, United States

- Unincorporated community
- Location within West Virginia Location within the United States
- Coordinates: 37°53′38″N 80°35′56″W
- Country: United States
- State: West Virginia
- County: Greenbrier
- Elevation: 2,641 ft (805 m)
- Time zone: UTC-5 (Eastern (EST))
  - Summer (DST): UTC-4 (EDT)
- Area codes: 304 & 681
- GNIS feature ID: 1554155

Clintonville is an unincorporated community in Greenbrier County, West Virginia, United States. Clintonville is located on U.S. Route 60, 8 miles (13 km) southeast of Rupert.
