= West Sunbury, Pennsylvania =

Borough in Pennsylvania, US

- Borough
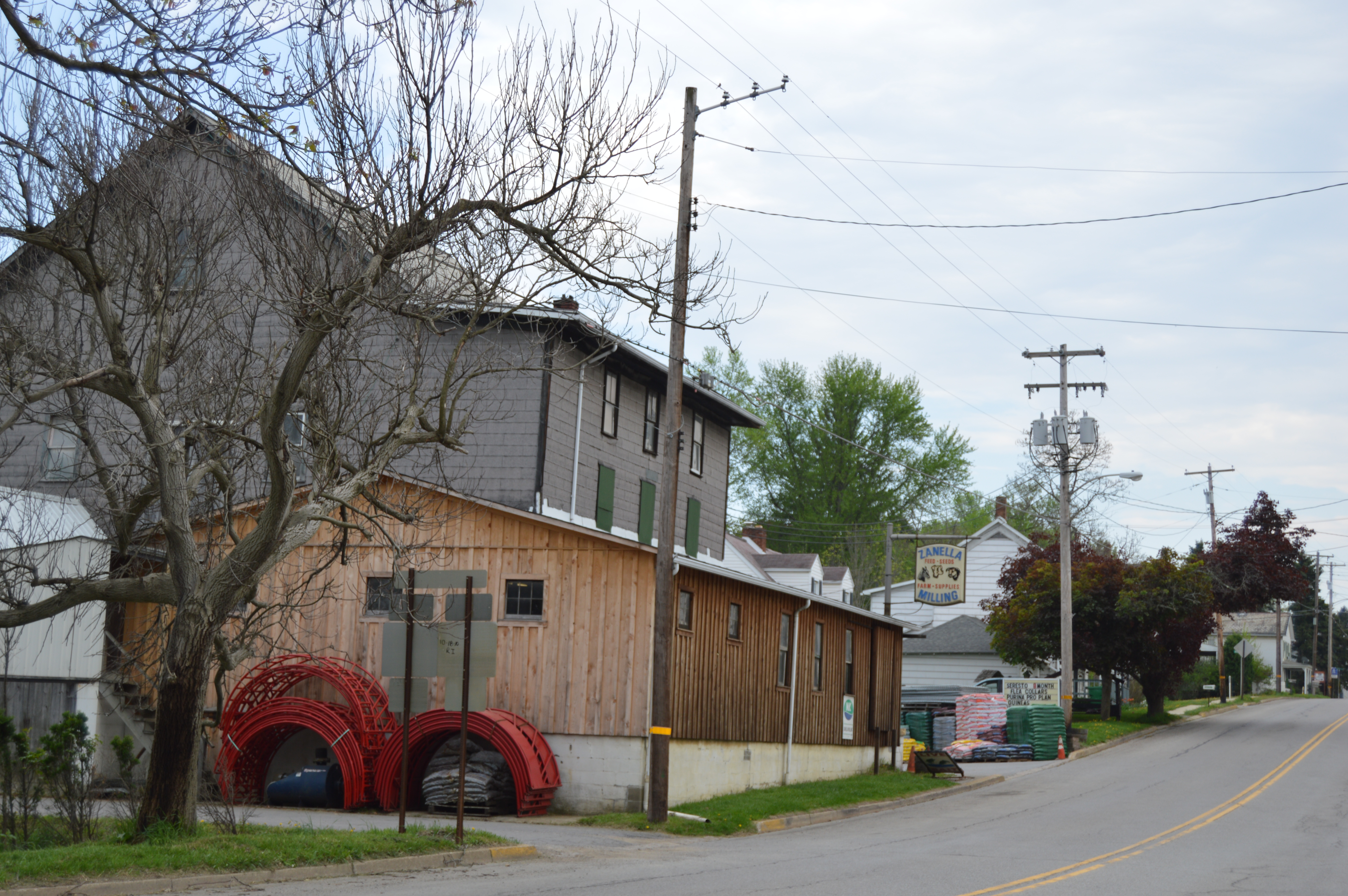
- Main Street

- Location of West Sunbury in Butler County, Pennsylvania.

- Location within Pennsylvania
- Coordinates: 41°00′22″N 79°53′46″W
- Country: United States
- State: Pennsylvania
- County: Butler
- Settled: 1828
- Incorporated: 1866

Government
  - Type: Borough Council
  - Mayor: Edwin Young, Jr

Area
  - Total: 0.11 sq mi (0.29 km^{2})
  - Land: 0.11 sq mi (0.29 km^{2})
  - Water: 0 sq mi (0.00 km^{2})

Population (2010)
  - Total: 192
  - Estimate (2019): 181
  - Density: 1,644.2/sq mi (634.82/km^{2})
- Time zone: UTC-5 (Eastern (EST))
  - Summer (DST): UTC-4 (EDT)
- Zip code: 16061
- FIPS code: 42-84064

West Sunbury is a borough in Butler County, Pennsylvania, United States. As of the 2020 census, West Sunbury had a population of 182.

== History ==
On the morning of December 25, 2022, the borough's primary marketplace burnt down. This significantly impacted most of the residents, as the next closest general store was in a neighboring town.

== Geography ==
West Sunbury is located in north-central Butler County. Pennsylvania Routes 138 and 308 run together through the center of the borough as Main Street. Via PA 308, it is 10 miles (16 km) south to Butler, the county seat.

According to the United States Census Bureau, West Sunbury has a total area of 0.11 square miles (0.29 km^{2}), all land.

== Demographics ==
Historical population
Census	Pop.	Note	%±
1870	216		—
1880	243		12.5%
1890	238		−2.1%
1900	254		6.7%
1910	283		11.4%
1920	217		−23.3%
1930	246		13.4%
1940	259		5.3%
1950	262		1.2%
1960	252		−3.8%
1970	216		−14.3%
1980	203		−6.0%
1990	177		−12.8%
2000	104		−41.2%
2010	192		84.6%
2020	182		−5.2%

As of the 2000 census, there were 104 people, 42 households, and 25 families residing in the borough. The population density was 1,021.8 inhabitants per square mile (394.5/km^{2}). There were 47 housing units at an average density of 461.8 per square mile (178.3/km^{2}). The racial makeup of the borough was 100.00% White. Hispanic or Latino of any race were 1.92% of the population.

There were 42 households, out of which 33.3% had children under the age of 18 living with them, 47.6% were married couples living together, 14.3% had a female householder with no husband present, and 38.1% were non-families. 31.0% of all households were made up of individuals, and 14.3% had someone living alone who was 65 years of age or older. The average household size was 2.48 and the average family size was 3.19.

In the borough the population was spread out, with 26.9% under the age of 18, 7.7% from 18 to 24, 27.9% from 25 to 44, 22.1% from 45 to 64, and 15.4% who were 65 years of age or older. The median age was 36 years. For every 100 females there were 116.7 males. For every 100 females age 18 and over, there were 76.7 males.

The median income for a household in the borough was $25,625, and the median income for a family was $33,750. Males had a median income of $27,000 versus $15,750 for females. The per capita income for the borough was $12,643. There were 14.8% of families and 21.3% of the population living below the poverty line, including 32.1% of under eighteens and 12.5% of those over 64.

== Arts and culture ==
In late June 2012, an airshow was held over West Sunbury.

== Education ==
Students in the borough and surrounding region belong to the Moniteau School District.

Children in kindergarten through sixth grade receive education at the only elementary school, Dassa McKinney, located east of borough. Students continue their education at Moniteau Jr./Sr. High School, located to the north of borough.

== Notable people ==
- Janet Anderson, 1982 U.S. Women's Open golf champion
- Bob Glenn, baseball player and civil engineer
- Brice Schwab, American football player
