= 1982 U.S. Women's Open =

Coordinates: 38.619°N 121.388°W

Tournament information
- Dates: July 22–25, 1982
- Location: Sacramento, California
- Course: Del Paso Country Club
- Organized by: USGA
- Tour: LPGA Tour

Statistics
- Par: 72
- Length: 6,342 yards (5,799 m)
- Field: 150 players, 68 after cut
- Cut: 154 (+10)
- Prize fund: $175,000
- Winner's share: $27,315

Champion
- (United States) Janet Alex
- 283 (−5)

Location in the United States
Location in California

The 1982 U.S. Women's Open was the 37th U.S. Women's Open, held July 22–25 at Del Paso Country Club in Sacramento, California.

Janet Alex shot a final round 68 (−4) for 283 (−5) to gain her only LPGA victory (and only major title), six strokes ahead of four runners-up. She began the final round in third, two strokes behind 54-hole leader Beth Daniel with two-time champion JoAnne Carner, the 36-hole leader, in second. Alex's 68 was the lowest score for all four rounds of the championship.

Attendance records were set for the U.S. Women's Open, with over 14,600 on Sunday and 44,600 for the week.

== Final leaderboard ==
Sunday, July 25, 1982

Place	Player	Score	To par	Money ($)
1	(United States) Janet Alex	70-73-72-68=283	−5	27,315
T2	(United States) Beth Daniel	71-71-71-76=289	+1	10,659
T2	(United States) Donna White	70-74-73-72=289	+1	10,659
T2	(United States) JoAnne Carner	69-70-75-75=289	+1	10,659
T2	(United States) Sandra Haynie	70-74-74-71=289	+1	10,659
6	(United States) Susie McAllister	77-70-75-71=293	+5	5,673
T7	(United States) Carole Jo Callison	76-69-72-77=294	+6	4,539
T7	(United States) Nancy Lopez	78-73-74-69=294	+6	4,539
T7	(United States) Vicki Tabor	70-76-75-73=294	+6	4,539
T10	(United States) Beverley Davis	73-72-76-74=295	+7	3,637
T10	(United States) Muffin Spencer-Devlin	76-71-76-72=295	+7	3,637
T10	(United States) Stephanie Farwig	75-76-72-72=295	+7	3,637
