= Clintonville Municipal Airport =

Airport in Wisconsin, United States

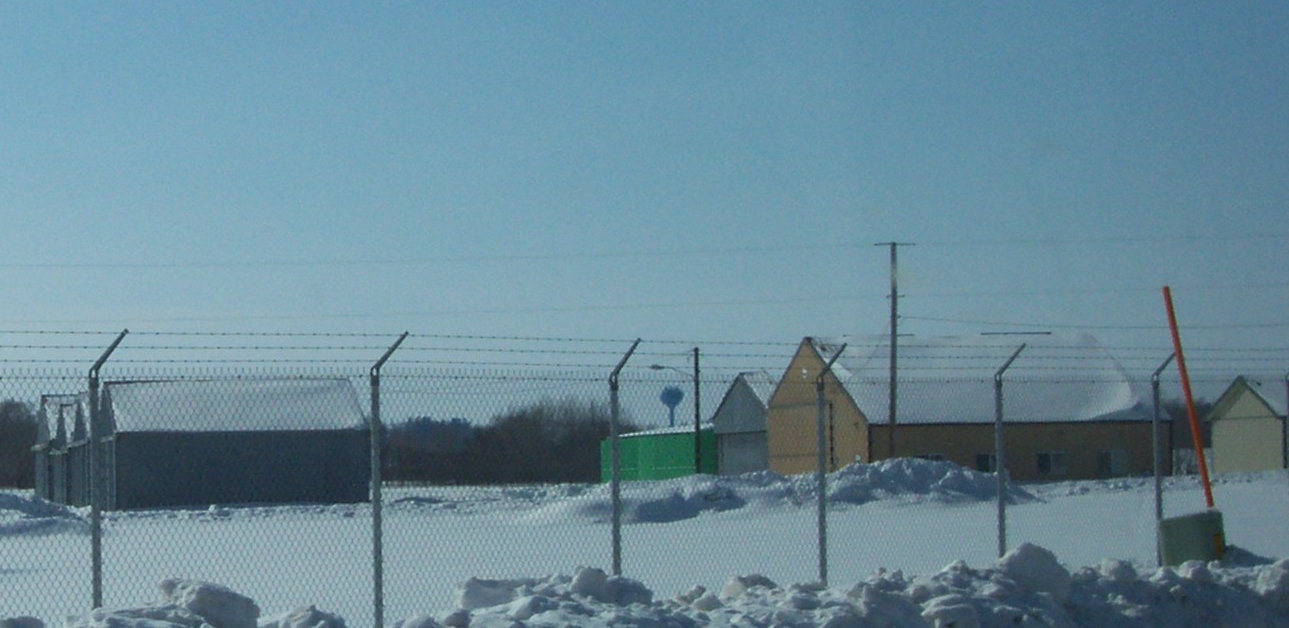
- Hangars

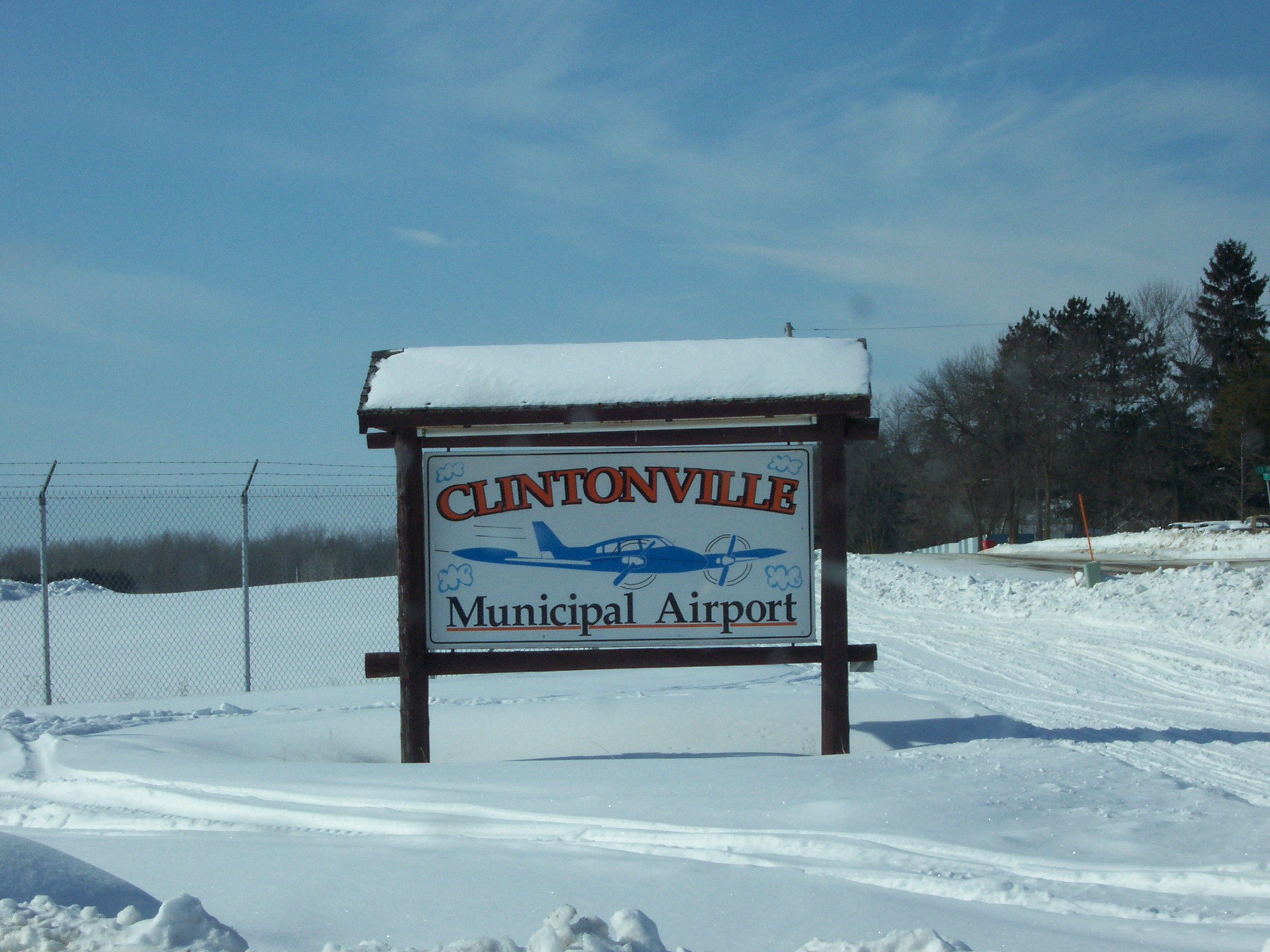
- Entrance sign
- IATA: CLI; ICAO: KCLI; FAA LID: CLI

Summary
- Airport type: Public
- Owner: City of Clintonville
- Serves: Clintonville, Wisconsin
- Opened: February 1940
- Time zone: CST (UTC−06:00)
  - Summer (DST): CDT (UTC−05:00)
- Elevation AMSL: 826 ft (252 m)
- Coordinates: 44°36′47″N 088°43′51″W

Map
- Location within Wisconsin Location within the United States

Runways
Direction	Length		Surface
Direction	ft	m	Surface
14/32	4,599	1,402	Asphalt
4/22	3,812	1,162	Asphalt
9/27	2,002	610	Turf

Statistics
- Aircraft operations (2023): 11,500
- Based aircraft (2024): 18
- Source: Federal Aviation Administration

Clintonville Municipal Airport (IATA: CLI, ICAO: KCLI, FAA LID: CLI) is located two miles southeast of Clintonville, in Waupaca County, Wisconsin, United States. The Federal Aviation Administration (FAA) National Plan of Integrated Airport Systems for 2025–2029 categorized it as a basic general aviation facility.

The airport was the birthplace of Wisconsin Central Airlines, which became North Central Airlines. It had scheduled flights to Clintonville from 1948 until 1966.

== Facilities ==
The airport covers 533 acres (216 ha) at an elevation of 826 feet (252 m). It has three runways: the primary runway 14/32 is 4,599 by 75 feet (1,402 x 23 m) asphalt; the crosswind runway 4/22 is 3,812 by 75 feet (1,162 x 23 m) asphalt; and 9/27 is 2,002 by 170 feet (610 x 52 m) turf.

In the year ending September 14, 2023 the airport had 11,500 aircraft operations, an average of 32 per day: 93% general aviation and 7% air taxi. In August 2024, there were 18 aircraft based at this airport: 17 single-engine and 1 multi-engine.

The CLINTONVILLE (CLI) non-directional beacon, 209 kHz, is on the field.

== See also ==
- List of airports in Wisconsin
