= Irwin Township, Pennsylvania =

Township in Pennsylvania, US

Coordinates: 41°14′30″N 79°56′59″W

Irwin Township, Venango County, Pennsylvania
- Township
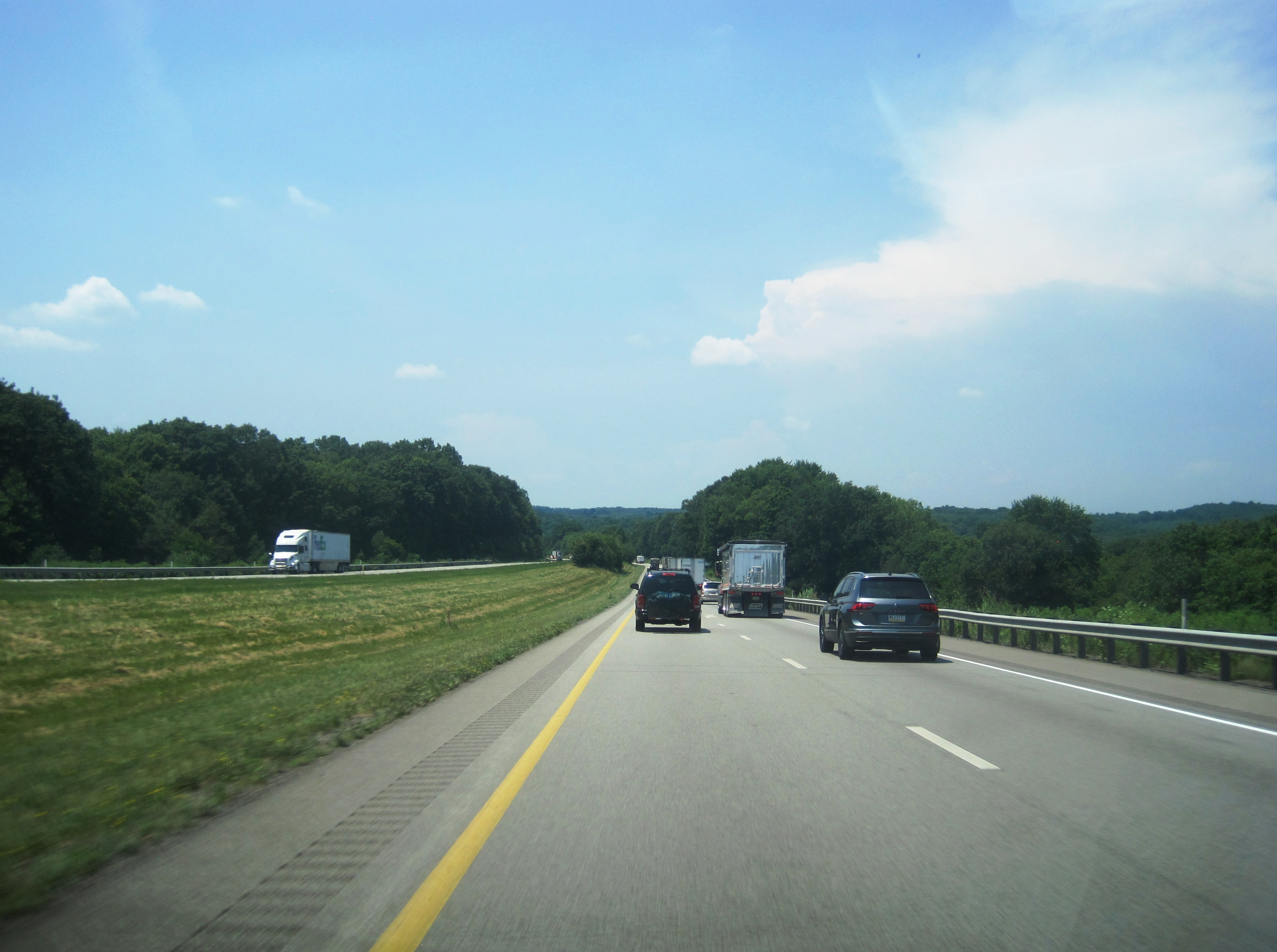
- I-80 westbound in Irwin Township

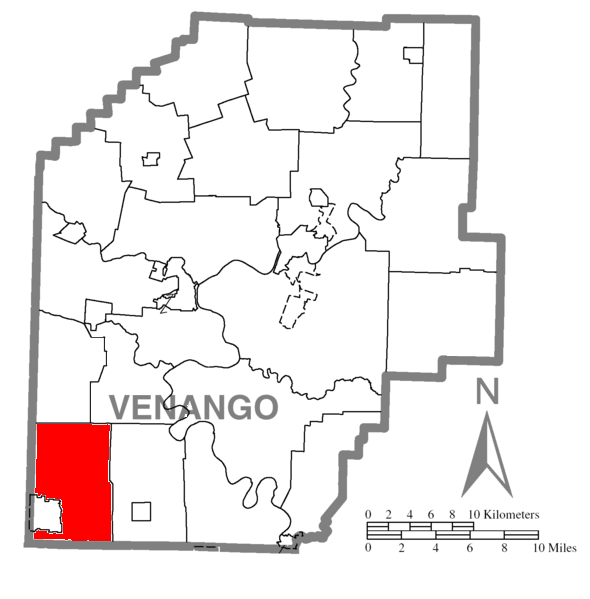
- Map of Venango County, Pennsylvania highlighting Irwin Township

- Map of Venango County, Pennsylvania
- Country: United States
- State: Pennsylvania
- County: Venango
- Settled: 1796
- Incorporated: 1800

Government
  - Type: Board of Supervisors

Area
  - Total: 30.54 sq mi (79.09 km^{2})
  - Land: 30.54 sq mi (79.09 km^{2})
  - Water: 0 sq mi (0.00 km^{2})

Population (2020)
  - Total: 1,253 ▼
  - Estimate (2024): 1,228
  - Density: 43/sq mi (16.6/km^{2})
- Time zone: UTC-5 (Eastern (EST))
  - Summer (DST): UTC-4 (EDT)
- Area code: 814
- FIPS code: 42-121-37200

Irwin Township is a township in Venango County, Pennsylvania, United States. The population was 1,253 at the 2020 census, a decrease from 1,319 in 2010, which represented, in turn, an increase from 1,309 as of the 2000 census.

== Geography ==
According to the United States Census Bureau, the township has a total area of 30.1 square miles (78 km^{2}), all land.

== Demographics ==
Historical population
Census	Pop.	Note	%±
2000	1,309		—
2010	1,391		6.3%
2020	1,253		−9.9%
2024 (est.)	1,228		−2.0%
U.S. Decennial Census

As of the census of 2000, there were 1,309 people, 494 households, and 379 families residing in the township. The population density was 43.4 inhabitants per square mile (16.8/km^{2}). There were 578 housing units at an average density of 19.2/sq mi (7.4/km^{2}). The racial makeup of the township was 98.32% White, 0.08% African American, 0.23% Native American, 0.15% Asian, 0.08% from other races, and 1.15% from two or more races. Hispanic or Latino of any race were 0.38% of the population.

There were 494 households, out of which 33.4% had children under the age of 18 living with them, 64.4% were married couples living together, 8.3% had a female householder with no husband present, and 23.1% were non-families. 20.2% of all households were made up of individuals, and 7.5% had someone living alone who was 65 years of age or older. The average household size was 2.63 and the average family size was 3.02.

In the township the population was spread out, with 26.1% under the age of 18, 8.3% from 18 to 24, 29.3% from 25 to 44, 24.8% from 45 to 64, and 11.5% who were 65 years of age or older. The median age was 37 years. For every 100 females, there were 104.2 males. For every 100 females age 18 and over, there were 101.0 males.

The median income for a household in the township was $34,615, and the median income for a family was $39,567. Males had a median income of $34,792 versus $23,194 for females. The per capita income for the township was $16,549. About 7.5% of families and 10.0% of the population were below the poverty line, including 13.0% of those under age 18 and 6.4% of those age 65 or over.
