= North Washington, Pennsylvania =

Unincorporated community in Pennsylvania, US

- Unincorporated community
- Location within Pennsylvania
- Coordinates: 41°02′52″N 79°48′48″W
- Country: United States
- State: Pennsylvania
- County: Butler
- Elevation: 1,503 ft (458 m)
- Time zone: UTC-5 (Eastern (EST))
  - Summer (DST): UTC-4 (EDT)
- ZIP code: 16048
- Area codes: 724, 878
- GNIS feature ID: 1182650

North Washington is an unincorporated community in Butler County, Pennsylvania, United States. The community is located at the intersection of state routes 38 and 138, 13.5 miles (21.7 km) north-northeast of Butler. North Washington has a post office with ZIP code 16048.

== Demographics ==
Historical population
Census	Pop.	Note	%±
2023 (est.)	178

The United States Census Bureau defined North Washington as a census designated place (CDP) in 2023.
