= Clintonville, Wisconsin =

- City
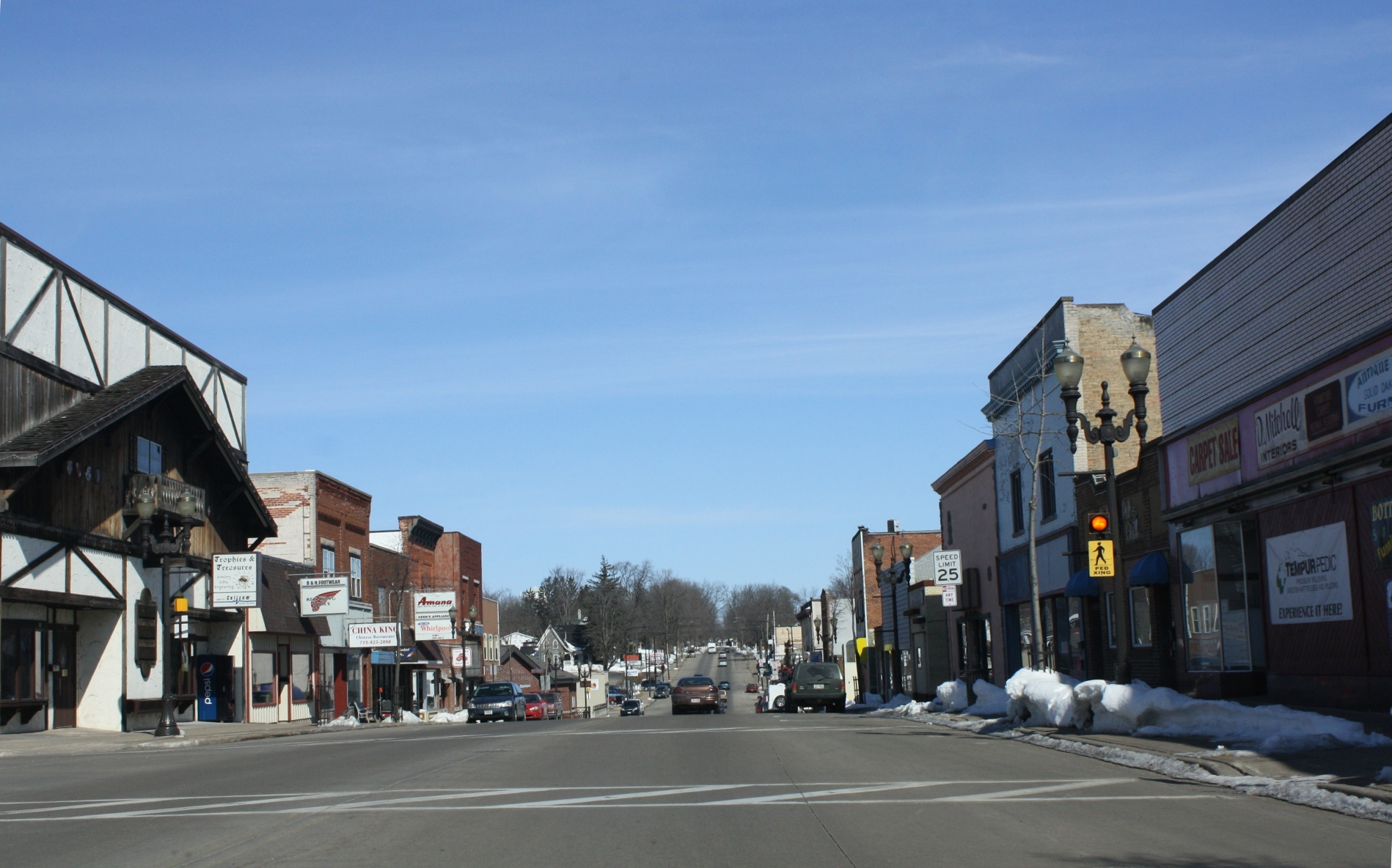
- Downtown Clintonville

- Location of Clintonville in Waupaca County, Wisconsin.

- Location within Wisconsin Location within the United States
- Coordinates: 44°37′27″N 88°45′29″W
- Country: United States
- State: Wisconsin
- County: Waupaca

Government
  - Mayor: Steve Kettenhoven

Area
  - Total: 4.54 sq mi (11.76 km^{2})
  - Land: 4.44 sq mi (11.51 km^{2})
  - Water: 0.093 sq mi (0.24 km^{2})
- Elevation: 814 ft (248 m)

Population (2020)
  - Total: 4,591
  - Density: 1,033/sq mi (398.9/km^{2})
- Time zone: UTC-6 (Central (CST))
  - Summer (DST): UTC-5 (CDT)
- Postal code: 54929
- Area codes: 715 & 534
- FIPS code: 55-15725
- GNIS feature ID: 1563198
- Website: www.clintonvillewi.gov

Clintonville is a city in Waupaca County, Wisconsin, United States. The population was 4,591 at the 2020 census. The area that became Clintonville was first settled in March, 1855.

== History ==
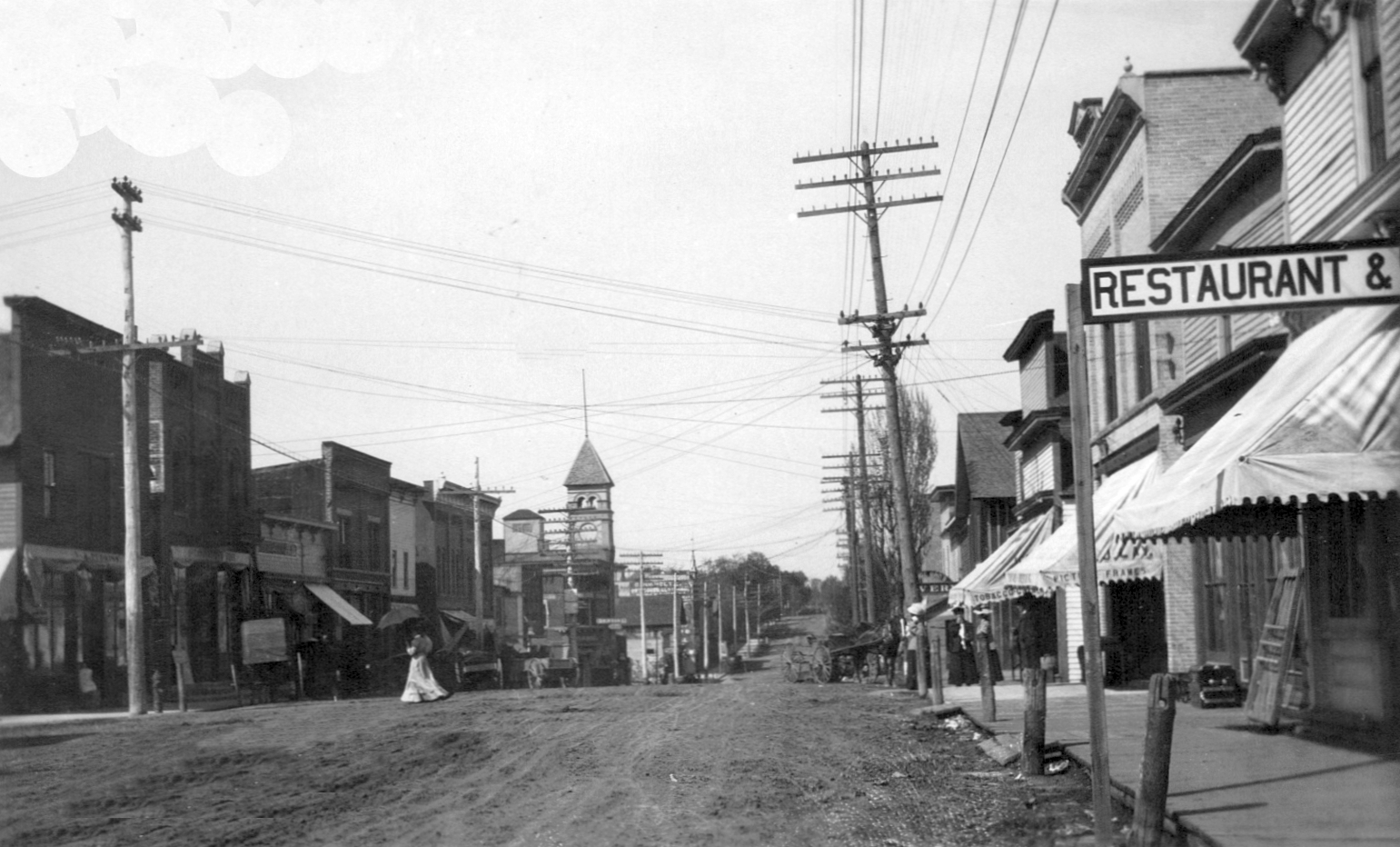
Clintonville, 1909

Clintonville lies within ancestral Menominee territory. In the Menominee language, it is known as Omīniahkan, "place where pigeons are hunted". It was ceded to the United States by the Menominee in 1836 through the Treaty of the Cedars, an agreement to sell over four million acres to the United States as part of the negotiations about how to accommodate the Oneida, Stockbridge-Munsee, and Brothertown peoples who were being removed from New York to Wisconsin. After this, the area around Clintonville became available for purchase by white American settlers.

In March, 1855 Norman Clinton and his family U. P. Clinton, Boardman Luman, and Mandy settled along the bank of the Pigeon River. They built the first establishment that grew into the city of Clintonville. The home they built was constructed of poles covered with hemlock boughs. It was used until a more suitable home built of logs could be constructed. They had drinking water from two large springs located on the bank of the river “Whose delicious water had flowed unmolested since the creation of the Universe.”

In March 2012, mysterious booms were heard by some in the city. The U.S. Geological Survey detected a 1.5 magnitude microearthquake nearby on March 21 that geophysicists said might have produced the sounds.

== Geography ==
According to the United States Census Bureau, the city has a total area of 4.46 square miles (11.55 km^{2}), of which 4.40 square miles (11.40 km^{2}) is land and 0.06 square miles (0.16 km^{2}) is water.

=== Climate ===
Climate data for Clintonville, Wisconsin (1991–2020 normals, extremes 1952–present)
Month	Jan	Feb	Mar	Apr	May	Jun	Jul	Aug	Sep	Oct	Nov	Dec	Year
Record high °F (°C)	53 (12)	71 (22)	82 (28)	92 (33)	96 (36)	101 (38)	106 (41)	104 (40)	101 (38)	89 (32)	74 (23)	62 (17)	106 (41)
Mean daily maximum °F (°C)	25.1 (−3.8)	29.4 (−1.4)	40.9 (4.9)	54.7 (12.6)	67.6 (19.8)	77.1 (25.1)	81.4 (27.4)	79.4 (26.3)	71.9 (22.2)	58.3 (14.6)	43.3 (6.3)	30.5 (−0.8)	55.0 (12.8)
Daily mean °F (°C)	16.2 (−8.8)	19.4 (−7.0)	30.5 (−0.8)	43.4 (6.3)	56.1 (13.4)	65.9 (18.8)	70.2 (21.2)	68.1 (20.1)	60.0 (15.6)	47.3 (8.5)	34.3 (1.3)	22.5 (−5.3)	44.5 (6.9)
Mean daily minimum °F (°C)	7.3 (−13.7)	9.4 (−12.6)	20.0 (−6.7)	32.1 (0.1)	44.5 (6.9)	54.8 (12.7)	59.1 (15.1)	56.7 (13.7)	48.0 (8.9)	36.4 (2.4)	25.2 (−3.8)	14.5 (−9.7)	34.0 (1.1)
Record low °F (°C)	−35 (−37)	−31 (−35)	−26 (−32)	6 (−14)	19 (−7)	31 (−1)	38 (3)	34 (1)	20 (−7)	15 (−9)	−10 (−23)	−23 (−31)	−35 (−37)
Average precipitation inches (mm)	1.27 (32)	1.08 (27)	1.87 (47)	2.99 (76)	3.72 (94)	4.47 (114)	3.92 (100)	3.74 (95)	3.61 (92)	2.88 (73)	1.93 (49)	1.49 (38)	32.97 (837)
Average snowfall inches (cm)	10.8 (27)	10.2 (26)	6.7 (17)	4.1 (10)	0.0 (0.0)	0.0 (0.0)	0.0 (0.0)	0.0 (0.0)	0.0 (0.0)	0.4 (1.0)	2.5 (6.4)	9.6 (24)	44.3 (113)
Average precipitation days (≥ 0.01 in)	9.4	6.9	8.1	9.9	11.9	11.4	10.4	9.4	10.1	9.6	8.0	8.8	113.9
Average snowy days (≥ 0.1 in)	7.3	5.2	4.0	1.8	0.0	0.0	0.0	0.0	0.0	0.2	2.4	6.1	27.0
Source: NOAA

== Demographics ==
Historical population
Census	Pop.	Note	%±
1880	573		—
1890	1,466		155.8%
1900	1,653		12.8%
1910	1,747		5.7%
1920	3,275		87.5%
1930	3,572		9.1%
1940	4,134		15.7%
1950	4,657		12.7%
1960	4,778		2.6%
1970	4,600		−3.7%
1980	4,567		−0.7%
1990	4,351		−4.7%
2000	4,736		8.8%
2010	4,559		−3.7%
2020	4,591		0.7%
U.S. Decennial Census

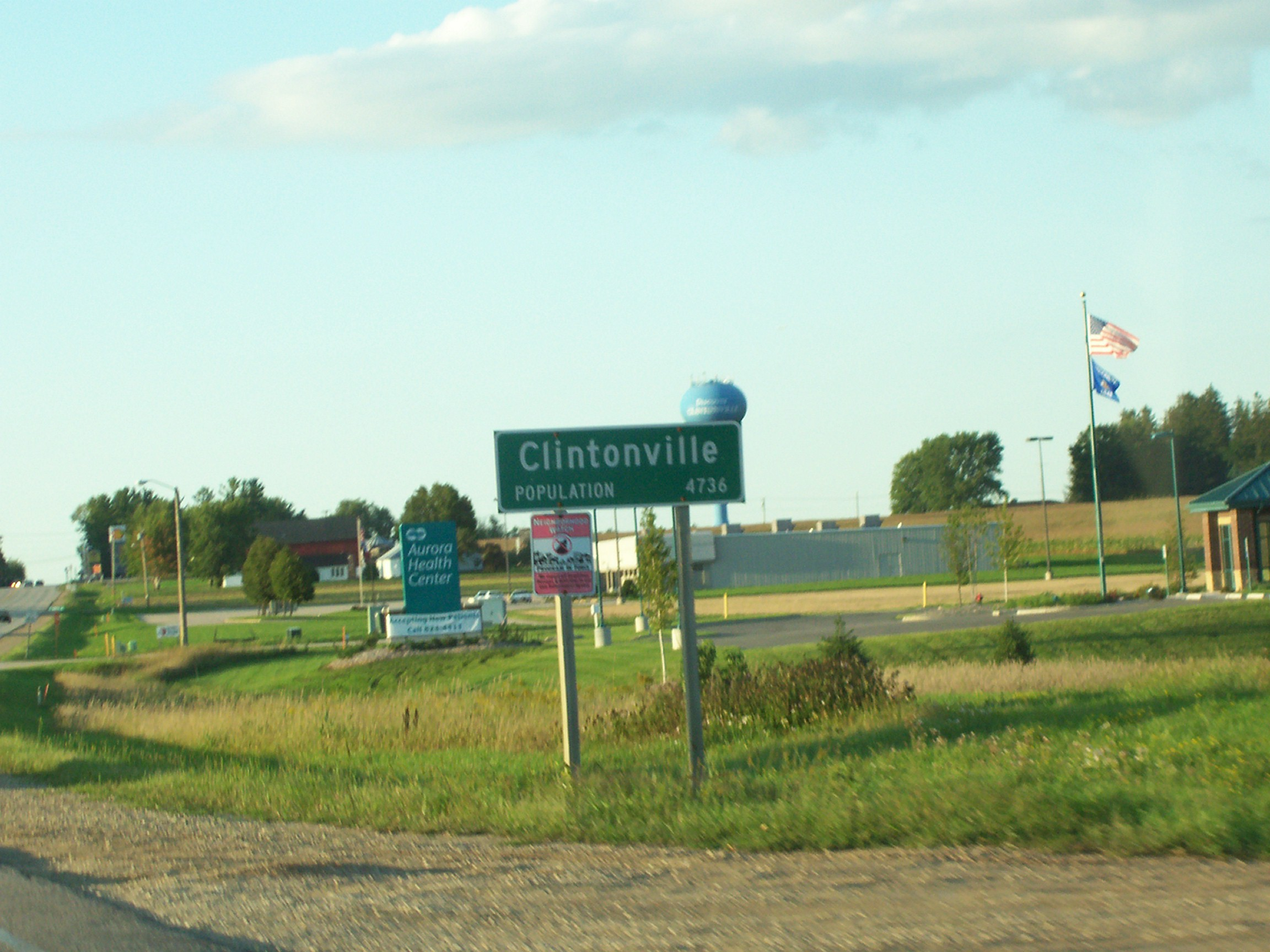
Sign on U.S. Route 45/Wisconsin Highway 22

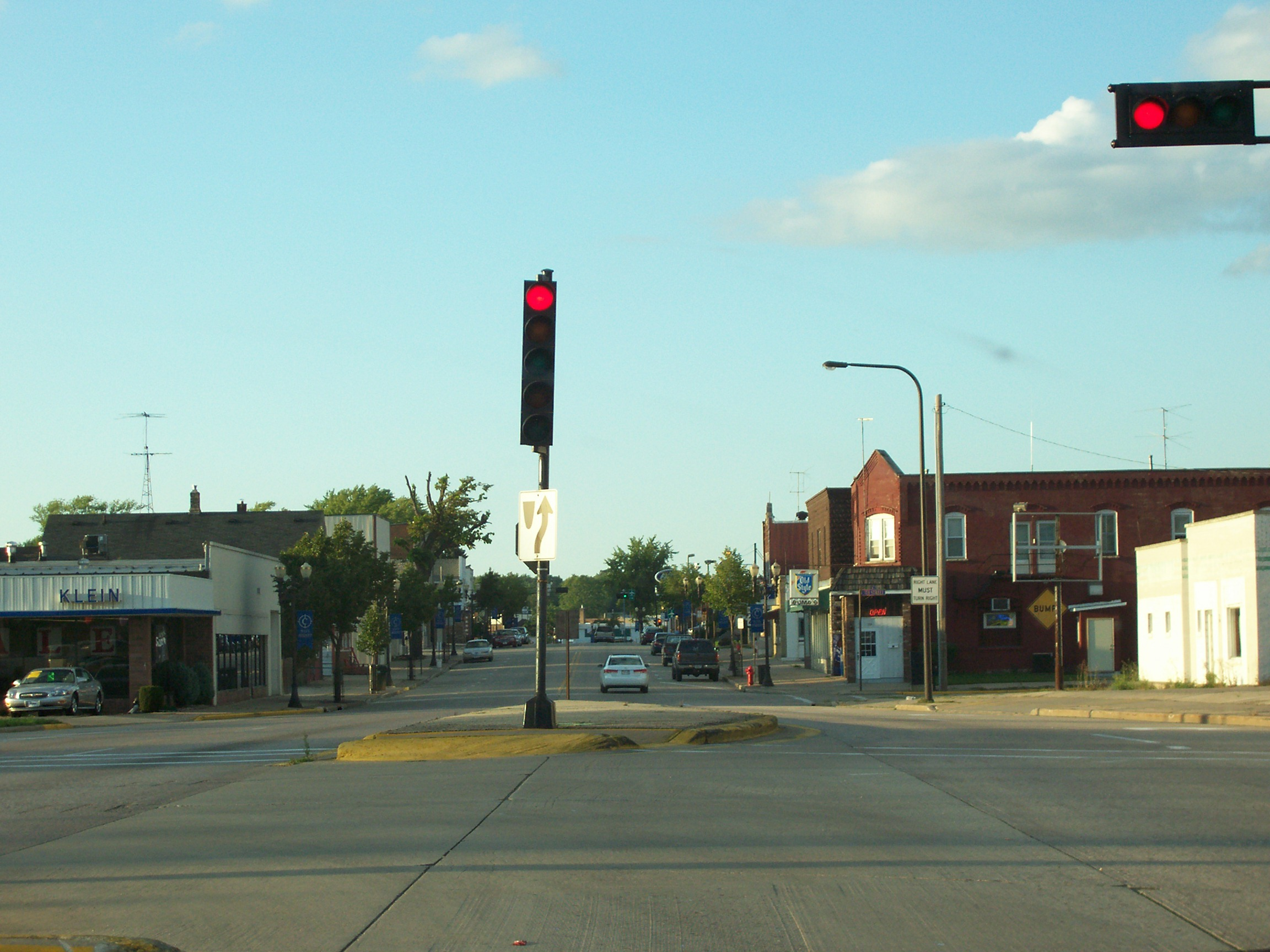
Clintonville

2020 census

As of the census of 2020, there were 4,591 people living in the city.

=== 2010 census ===
As of the census of 2010, there were 4,559 people, 2,002 households, and 1,154 families living in the city. The population density was 1,036.1 inhabitants per square mile (400.0/km^{2}). There were 2,227 housing units at an average density of 506.1 per square mile (195.4/km^{2}). The racial makeup of the city was 95.6% White, 0.3% African American, 1.1% Native American, 0.4% Asian, 0.9% from other races, and 1.7% from two or more races. Hispanic or Latino of any race were 3.3% of the population.

There were 2,002 households, of which 29.5% had children under the age of 18 living with them, 41.4% were married couples living together, 10.0% had a female householder with no husband present, 6.2% had a male householder with no wife present, and 42.4% were non-families. 36.9% of all households were made up of individuals, and 17.6% had someone living alone who was 65 years of age or older. The average household size was 2.24 and the average family size was 2.92.

The median age in the city was 39.3 years. 24.4% of residents were under the age of 18; 8.1% were between the ages of 18 and 24; 24.6% were from 25 to 44; 24% were from 45 to 64; and 18.9% were 65 years of age or older. The gender makeup of the city was 47.6% male and 52.4% female.

=== 2000 census ===
As of the census of 2000, there were 4,736 people, 2,010 households, and 1,228 families living in the city. The population density was 1,120.7 people per square mile (432.3/km^{2}). There were 2,147 housing units at an average density of 508.1 per square mile (196.0/km^{2}). The racial makeup of the city was 97.00% White, 0.23% African American, 0.53% Native American, 0.25% Asian, 0.00% Pacific Islander, 0.99% from other races, and 0.99% from two or more races. 2.15% of the population were Hispanic or Latino of any race.

There were 2,010 households, out of which 28.6% had children under the age of 18 living with them, 47.4% were married couples living together, 9.8% had a female householder with no husband present, and 38.9% were non-families. 34.2% of all households were made up of individuals, and 18.8% had someone living alone who was 65 years of age or older. The average household size was 2.30 and the average family size was 2.93.

In the city, the population was spread out, with 24.5% under the age of 18, 8.1% from 18 to 24, 26.4% from 25 to 44, 19.0% from 45 to 64, and 22.0% who were 65 years of age or older. The median age was 39 years. For every 100 females, there were 87.4 males. For every 100 females age 18 and over, there were 83.2 males.

The median income for a household in the city was $33,947, and the median income for a family was $40,602. Males had a median income of $32,260 versus $22,192 for females. The per capita income for the city was $16,353. 9.5% of the population and 7.4% of families were below the poverty line. Out of the total population, 11.5% of those under the age of 18 and 13.3% of those 65 and older were living below the poverty line.

== Economy ==
The Four Wheel Drive Auto Company was founded in 1909 in Clintonville as the Badger Four-Wheel Drive Auto Company.

The Seagrave Fire Apparatus plant is located in Clintonville.

Clintonville Municipal Airport is noted as the location where Wisconsin Central Airlines was founded in 1944. The company then became North Central Airlines and later Republic Airlines.

== Infrastructure ==
=== Transportation ===
==== Major highways ====
U.S. 45 Southbound, US 45 routes to New London. Northbound, US 45 routes to Wittenberg.
WIS 156 travels eastbound to WIS 29.
WIS 22 travels north to Shawano and runs south concurrent with US 45 to Waupaca.

==== Airport ====
- KCLI - Clintonville Municipal Airport

== Religion ==
St. Paul Lutheran Church is a church of the Wisconsin Evangelical Lutheran Synod in Clintonville.

Calvary Apostolic Church in Clintonville is one of the oldest Apostolic Pentecostal churches in the state of Wisconsin. It was founded in 1928.

== Notable people ==
- Dick Bennett, basketball coach
- Tony Bennett, Son of Dick Bennett and basketball coach
- Fred Hess, legislator
- Jean Hundertmark, legislator and 2006 Republican nominee for Lieutenant Governor
- Justin Jirschele, MLB coach, son of Mike Jirschele
- Mike Jirschele, MLB coach
- J. Elmer Lehr, legislator
- William Lorge, legislator
- George W. Meggers, legislator
- William Frederick Meggers, physicist
- Otto L. Olen, legislator
- Frank J. Olmsted, legislator
- Jeffrey B. Remmel, mathematician
- Daniel V. Speckhard, diplomat
- Julius Spearbraker, legislator
- Joanne Lagatta , 1991 Scripps National Spelling Bee Champion
