= Clay Township, Butler County, Pennsylvania =

Township in Pennsylvania, US

Coordinates: 40°59′36″N 79°55′22″W

- Township
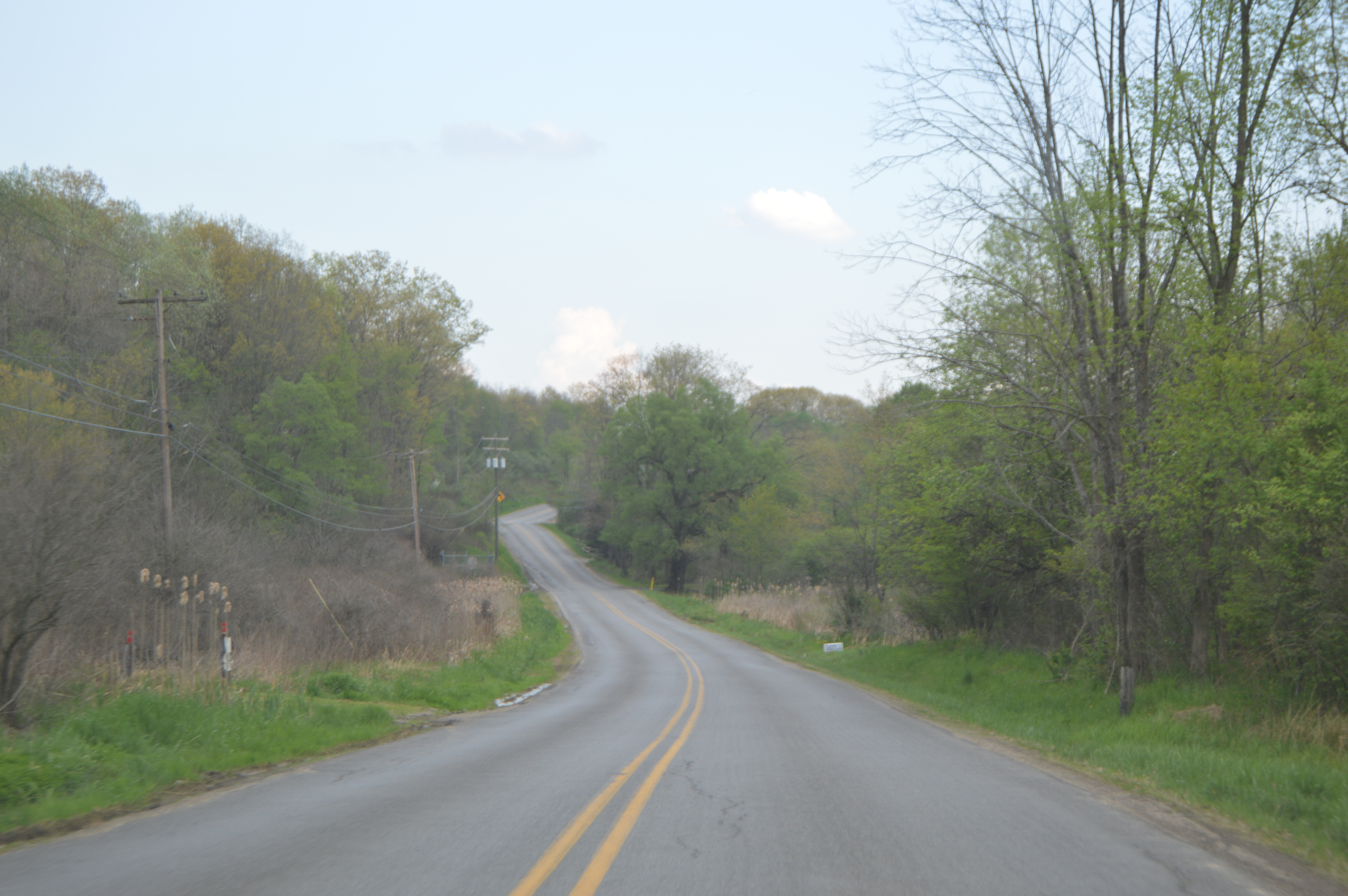
- Rural scene near West Sunbury

- Logo

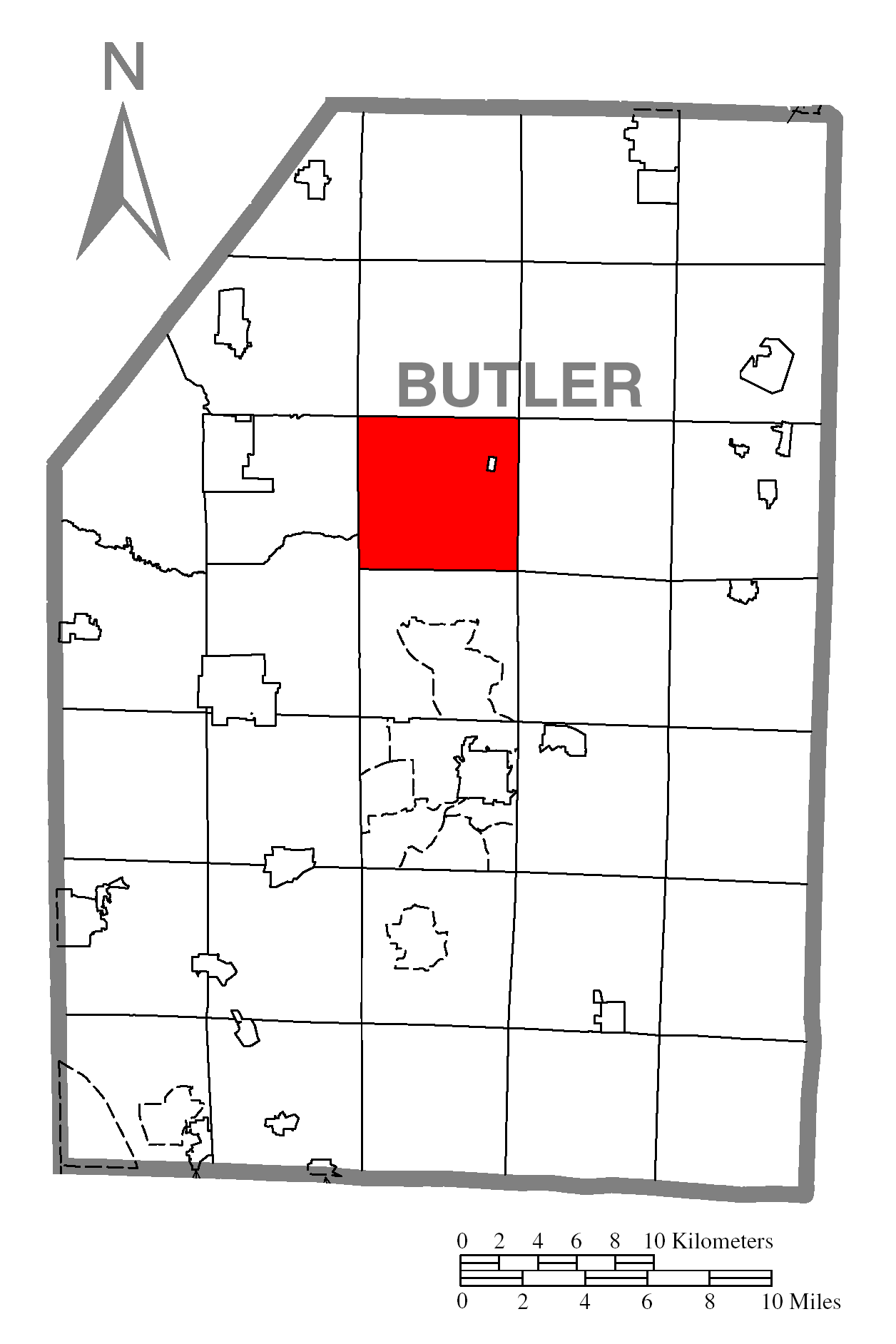
- Map of Butler County, Pennsylvania, highlighting Clay Township

- Map of Butler County, Pennsylvania
- Country: United States
- State: Pennsylvania
- County: Butler
- Settled: 1797
- Incorporated: 1854

Area
  - Total: 25.12 sq mi (65.05 km^{2})
  - Land: 25.12 sq mi (65.05 km^{2})
  - Water: 0 sq mi (0.00 km^{2})

Population (2020)
  - Total: 2,547 ▼
  - Estimate (2022): 2,498
  - Density: 104/sq mi (40.2/km^{2})
- Time zone: UTC-5 (Eastern (EST))
  - Summer (DST): UTC-4 (EDT)
- FIPS code: 42-019-13936
- Website: claytwpbutler.com

Clay Township is a township in Butler County, Pennsylvania, United States. The population was 2,547 at the 2020 census.

== Geography ==
Clay Township was formed in 1854 in north-central Butler County from portions of other townships.

Clay Township contains the unincorporated communities of Claytonia, Sherwin, Euclid, Muddy Creek, and Queen Junction. It surrounds the borough of West Sunbury but is a separate political entity.

According to the United States Census Bureau, the township has a total area of 25.1 square miles (65.0 km^{2}), all land.

== Demographics ==
Historical population
Census	Pop.	Note	%±
2010	2,703		—
2020	2,547		−5.8%
2022 (est.)	2,498		−1.9%
U.S. Decennial Census

As of the 2000 census, there were 2,628 people, 980 households, and 750 families living in the township. The population density was 104.5 inhabitants per square mile (40.3/km^{2}). There were 1,036 housing units at an average density of 41.2 per square mile (15.9/km^{2}). The racial makeup of the township was 99.5% White, 0.1% Asian, 0.2% from other races, and 0.1% from two or more races. Hispanic or Latino of any race were 0.2% of the population.

There were 980 households, out of which 37.6% had children under the age of 18 living with them, 62.3% were married couples living together, 9.6% had a female householder with no husband present, and 23.4% were non-families. 19.4% of all households were made up of individuals, and 6.7% had someone living alone who was 65 years of age or older. The average household size was 2.67 and the average family size was 3.04.

In the township the population was spread out, with 26.4% under the age of 18, 7.3% from 18 to 24, 32.5% from 25 to 44, 25.1% from 45 to 64, and 8.6% who were 65 years of age or older. The median age was 37 years. For every 100 females there were 100.9 males. For every 100 females age 18 and over, there were 97.4 males.

The median income for a household in the township was $33,688, and the median income for a family was $40,833. Males had a median income of $33,259 versus $22,414 for females. The per capita income for the township was $17,195. About 8.4% of families and 14.6% of the population were below the poverty line, including 16.5% of those under age 18 and 12.3% of those age 65 or over.
