= Concord Township, Butler County, Pennsylvania =

Township in Pennsylvania, US

Coordinates: 40°59′42″N 79°49′59″W

- Township
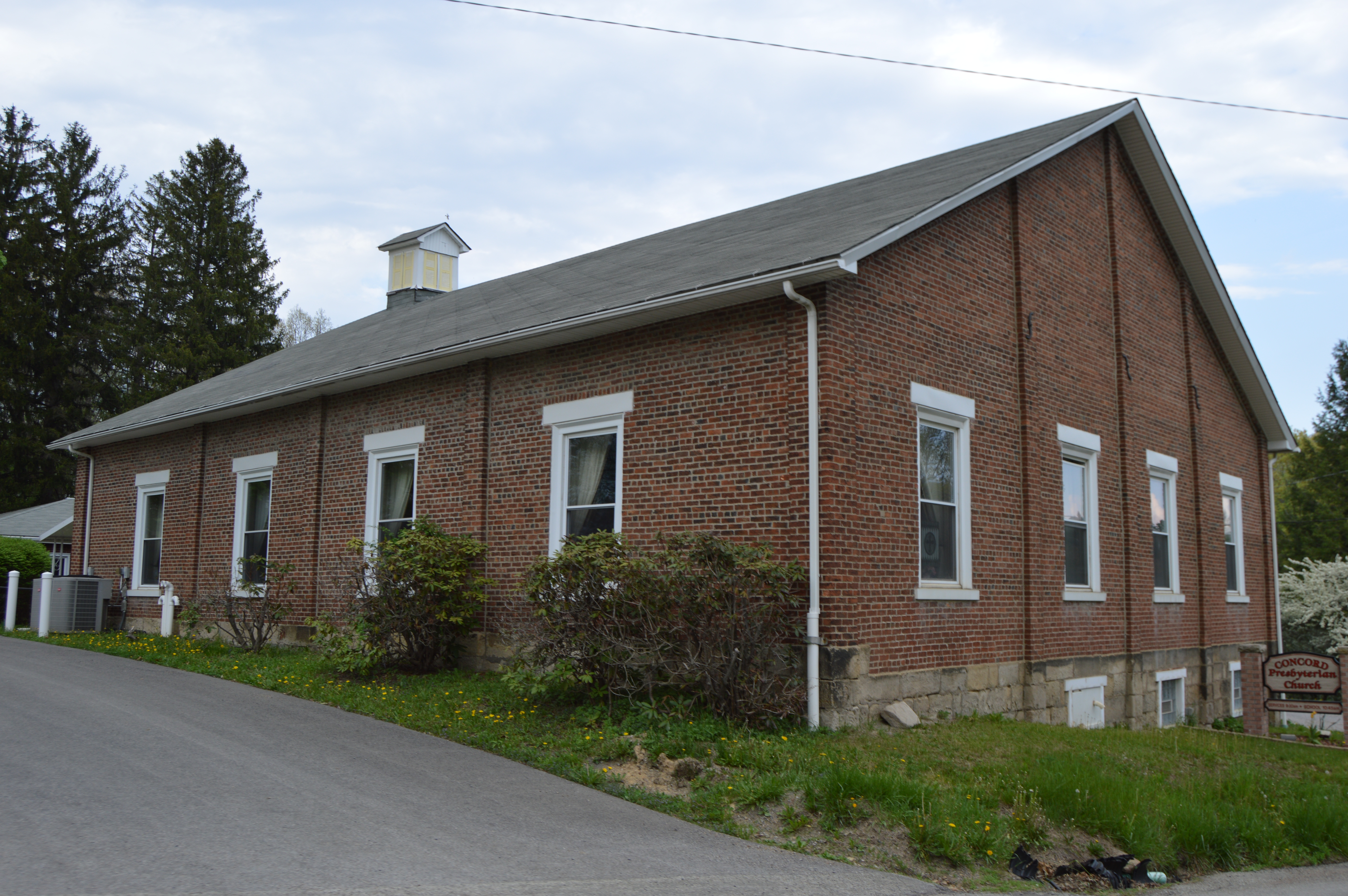
- Concord Presbyterian Church at Hooker

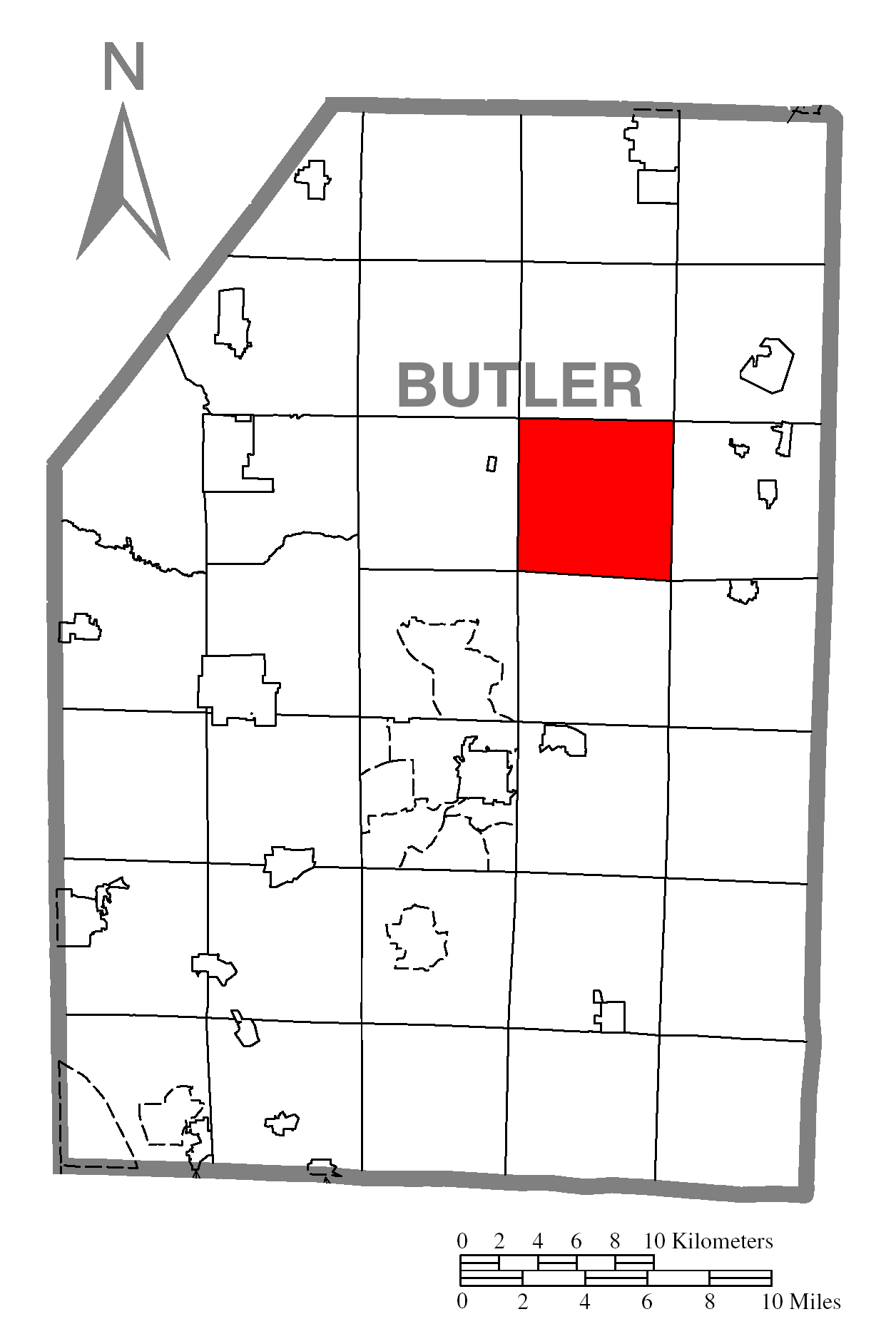
- Map of Butler County, Pennsylvania, highlighting Concord Township

- Map of Butler County, Pennsylvania
- Country: United States
- State: Pennsylvania
- County: Butler
- Settled: 1796
- Incorporated: 1854

Area
  - Total: 24.20 sq mi (62.67 km^{2})
  - Land: 24.19 sq mi (62.64 km^{2})
  - Water: 0.012 sq mi (0.03 km^{2})

Population (2020)
  - Total: 1,411 ▼
  - Estimate (2022): 1,383
  - Density: 60/sq mi (23.2/km^{2})
- Time zone: UTC-5 (Eastern (EST))
  - Summer (DST): UTC-4 (EDT)
- FIPS code: 42-019-15480

Concord Township is a township in Butler County, Pennsylvania, United States. The population was 1,411 at the 2020 census.

== Geography ==
Concord Township was formed in 1854 northeast of the center of Butler County from portions of other townships.

Concord Township contains the unincorporated communities of Hooker and Greece City.

According to the United States Census Bureau, the township has a total area of 24.2 square miles (62.7 km^{2}), of which 0.012 square miles (0.03 km^{2}), or 0.04%, is water.

== Demographics ==
Historical population
Census	Pop.	Note	%±
2010	1,505		—
2020	1,411		−6.2%
2022 (est.)	1,383		−2.0%
U.S. Decennial Census

As of the 2000 census, there were 1,493 people, 569 households, and 425 families living in the township. The population density was 60.0 inhabitants per square mile (23.2/km^{2}). There were 602 housing units at an average density of 24.2/sq mi (9.3/km^{2}). The racial makeup of the township was 99.3% White, 0.1% African American, and 0.6% from two or more races.

There were 569 households, out of which 32.7% had children under the age of 18 living with them, 62.9% were married couples living together, 7.7% had a female householder with no husband present, and 25.3% were non-families. 20.7% of all households were made up of individuals, and 7.0% had someone living alone who was 65 years of age or older. The average household size was 2.60 and the average family size was 3.03.

In the township the population was spread out, with 24.6% under the age of 18, 8.8% from 18 to 24, 31.2% from 25 to 44, 25.0% from 45 to 64, and 10.3% who were 65 years of age or older. The median age was 37 years. For every 100 females there were 97.0 males. For every 100 females age 18 and over, there were 99.1 males.

The median income for a household in the township was $40,134, and the median income for a family was $44,107. Males had a median income of $30,882 versus $23,250 for females. The per capita income for the township was $18,762. About 7.7% of families and 11.4% of the population were below the poverty line, including 16.3% of those under age 18 and 11.2% of those age 65 or over.
