= Pennsylvania's 21st Senate district =

American legislative district

Pennsylvania's 21st State Senate district
Senator
Scott Hutchinson; R–Oil City
- Population (2021): 258,167

Pennsylvania State Senate District 21 includes parts of Butler County and Erie County and all of Clarion County, Forest County, Venango County, and Warren County. It is currently represented by Republican Scott Hutchinson.

== District profile ==
The district includes the following areas:

Butler County

- Allegheny Township
- Brady Township
- Bruin
- Buffalo Township
- Butler
- Butler Township
- Center Township
- Cherry Township
- Cherry Valley
- Chicora
- Clay Township
- Clearfield Township
- Clinton Township
- Concord Township
- Connoquenessing
- Connoquenessing Township
- Donegal Township
- East Butler
- Eau Claire
- Fairview
- Fairview Township
- Franklin Township
- Harrisville
- Jefferson Township
- Karns City
- Marion Township
- Mercer Township
- Muddy Creek Township
- Oakland Township
- Parker Township
- Penn Township
- Petrolia
- Portersville
- Prospect
- Saxonburg
- Slippery Rock
- Slippery Rock Township
- Summit Township
- Venango Township
- Washington Township
- West Liberty
- West Sunbury
- Winfield Township
- Worth Township

All of Clarion County

Erie County

- Concord Township
- Corry
- Elgin
- Wayne Township

All of Forest county

All of Venango County

All of Warren County

== Senators ==
Representative	Party	Years	District home	Note
Samuel Power	Republican	1823 – 1828		Pennsylvania State Senator for the 19th district from 1815 to 1822
Moses Sullivan	Democratic	1825 – 1828		Pennsylvania State Senator for the 25th district from 1829 to 1832
William Hays	Anti-Masonic	1831 – 1834		
Cornelius Darragh	Anti-Masonic	1835 – 1836		Pennsylvania State Senator for the 19th district from 1837 to 1838. U.S. Representative for Pennsylvania's 21st congressional district from 1844 to 1847. 25th Attorney General of Pennsylvania from 1849 to 1851.
Joseph M. Sterrett	Whig	1837 – 1840		
John Wilson Farrelly	Whig	1841 – 1842		Pennsylvania State Representative in 1837. Pennsylvania State Senator for the 26th district from 1843 to 1844. U.S. Representative for Pennsylvania's 22nd congressional district from 1847 to 1849.
John Hill	Democratic	1845 – 1846		Pennsylvania State Senator for the 16th district from 1843 to 1844
Samuel Hill	Democratic	1845 – 1848		
Isaac Hugus	Democratic	1849 – 1850		
William Haslett	Whig	1851 – 1852		Pennsylvania State Senator for the 24th district from 1849 to 1850
Archibald Robertson	Republican	1851 – 1852		
John C. Ferguson	Whig	1853 – 1856		
John R. Harris	Republican	1857 – 1858		Pennsylvania State Senator for the 25th district from 1859 to 1860
Jonathan E. Meredith	Republican	1861 – 1862		
Henry Lloyd Wright	Republican	1863 – 1874		
Louis Williams Hall	Republican	1865 – 1868		Pennsylvania State Senator for the 20th district from 1861 to 1862
Kirk Haines	Whig	1865 – 1866		
Samuel Townsend Shugert	Democratic	1867 – 1868		
Charles J. T. McIntyre	Democratic	1867 – 1870		
John Kincaid Robison	Republican	1869 – 1870		
Hiram Findlay	Democratic	1871 – 1872		Pennsylvania State Senator for the 20th district from 1869 to 1870
Robert Bruce Petriken	Democratic	1871 – 1872		Pennsylvania State Senator for the 22nd district from 1873 to 1874
David McLean Crawford	Democratic	1871 – 1872		Pennsylvania State Senator for the 22nd district from 1873 to 1874 and the 31st district from 1877 to 1880
John A. Lemon	Republican	1873 – 1874		Pennsylvania State Senator for the 35th district from 1875 to 1896
Hubbard Bester Payne	Republican	1875 – 1876		
Elijah Catlin Wadhams	Republican	1877 – 1880		
Eckley Brinton Coxe	Democratic	1881 – 1884		
Morgan B. Williams	Republican	1885 – 1888		
William Henry Hines	Democratic	1889 – 1892		
Clarence W. Kline	Republican	1893 – 1896		
William J. Scott	Republican	1897 – 1900		
William Drury	Republican	1901 – 1904		
Sterling Ross Catlin	Republican	1905 – 1920		
Laning Harvey	Republican	1929 – 1936		
Leo C. Mundy	Democratic	1939 – 1944		
Peter M. Margie	Democratic	1945 – 1948		
Patrick J. Toole	Democratic	1949 – 1954		
William H. Davis	Democratic	1955 – 1956		
Titian James Coffey	Republican	1959 – 1960		Pennsylvania State Senator for the 25th district from 1957 to 1958
Donald O. Oesterling	Democratic	1965 – 1972	Butler	
W. Thomas Andrews	Republican	1973 – 1980	New Castle	
Tim Shaffer	Republican	1981 – 1996	Butler	
Mary Jo White	Republican	1997 – 2012	Franklin	
Scott Hutchinson	Republican	2012 –	Oil City	
