= Buffalo Creek (Allegheny River tributary) =

Location
- Country: United States

Physical characteristics
- Source
  - coordinates: 40.9461747°N 79.7886623°W
- Mouth
  - coordinates: 40.6697877°N 79.6928260°W
  - elevation: 745 ft (227 m)

Basin features
- River system: Allegheny River
- Tributaries
  - left: Patterson Creek, Marrowbone Run, Sipes Run, Pine Run
  - right: Little Buffalo Run, Rough Run, Cornplanter Run, Little Buffalo Creek

Buffalo Creek is a tributary of the Allegheny River in Armstrong and Butler counties, Pennsylvania in the United States.

Buffalo Creek joins the Allegheny River at the borough of Freeport.

== Tributaries ==
(Mouth at the Allegheny River)

- Little Buffalo Creek
  - Sarver Run
- Pine Run
- Cornplanter Run
- Rough Run
  - North Branch Rough Run
    - Sarver Run
- Marrowbone Run
- Patterson Creek
  - Long Run
- Little Buffalo Run

Tributaries of Buffalo Creek
Name	Number	Bank	Mouth	Political subdivision	Source	Political subdivision
Buffalo Creek	0	Right	40°40′11″N 79°41′34″W (elev. 745 feet (227 m))	Freeport	40°56′46″N 79°47′19″W	Oakland Township, Butler County
Little Buffalo Run	1	Right	40°51′55″N 79°42′06″W (elev. 1,079 feet (329 m))	Clearfield Township, Butler County	40°50′27″N 79°47′32″W	Summit Township, Butler County
Patterson Creek	2	Left	40°51′06″N 79°38′17″W (elev. 988 feet (301 m))	West Franklin Township, Armstrong County	40°57′11″N 79°40′51″W	Sugarcreek Township, Armstrong County
Long Run	2.1	Left	40°52′03″N 79°38′15″W (elev. 1,017 feet (310 m))	West Franklin Township, Armstrong County	40°54′31″N 79°35′33″W	Sugarcreek Township, Armstrong County
Marrowbone Run	3	Left	40°47′37″N 79°39′06″W (elev. 948 feet (289 m))	North Buffalo Township, Armstrong County	40°46′50″N 79°37′15″W	North Buffalo Township, Armstrong County
Rough Run	4	Right	40°47′05″N 79°41′16″W (elev. 873 feet (266 m))	North Buffalo Township, Armstrong County	40°49′13″N 79°48′14″W	Summit Township, Butler County
North Branch Rough Run	4.1	Right	40°48′18″N 79°43′44″W (elev. 1,043 feet (318 m))	Winfield Township, Butler County	40°50′19″N 79°45′19″W	Clearfield Township, Butler County
Sarver Run	4.1.1	Right	40°48′40″N 79°43′55″W (elev. 1,060 feet (320 m))	Winfield Township, Butler County	40°49′55″N 79°45′29″W	Clearfield Township, Butler County
Sipes Run	5	Left	40°46′09″N 79°40′22″W (elev. 856 feet (261 m))	South Buffalo Township, Armstrong County	40°47′09″N 79°40′28″W	North Buffalo Township, Armstrong County
Cornplanter Run	6	Right	40°45′16″N 79°40′21″W (elev. 846 feet (258 m))	South Buffalo Township, Armstrong County	40°46′19″N 79°44′06″W	Winfield Township, Butler County
Pine Run	7	Left	40°43′59″N 79°40′46″W (elev. 830 feet (250 m))	South Buffalo Township, Armstrong County	40°46′33″N 79°37′33″W	North Buffalo Township, Armstrong County
Little Buffalo Creek	8	Right	40°42′32″N 79°42′08″W (elev. 801 feet (244 m))	Buffalo Township, Butler County	40°47′43″N 79°47′46″W	Jefferson Township, Butler County
Sarver Run	8.1	Right	40°43′10″N 79°44′49″W (elev. 965 feet (294 m))	Buffalo Township, Butler County	40°46′32″N 79°47′50″W	Jefferson Township, Butler County

=== Cornplanter Run ===
Cornplanter Run is a stream located just 5.6 miles from Freeport in South Buffalo township. It was once known as Cornplanter's Run, named for Chief Cornplanter whose people once resided near its mouth where they raised corn.

== Political subdivisions ==
Buffalo Creek traverses the following political subdivisions, given in the order encountered traveling downstream.

- Oakland Township, Butler County
- Clearfield Township, Butler County
- West Franklin Township, Armstrong County
- North Buffalo Township, Armstrong County
- South Buffalo Township, Armstrong County
- Buffalo Township, Butler County
- Freeport

== See also ==
- Tributaries of the Allegheny River
- List of rivers of Pennsylvania
- List of tributaries of the Allegheny River
