= Bill Saul =

American football player (1940–2006)

No. 50, 51, 58
- Position: Linebacker

Personal information
- Born: November 19, 1940; Unionville, Pennsylvania, U.S.
- Died: September 12, 2006 (aged 65); Baltimore, Maryland, U.S.
- Listed height: 6 ft 4 in (1.93 m)
- Listed weight: 224 lb (102 kg)

Career information
- High school: Butler (Butler, Pennsylvania)
- College: Penn State
- NFL draft: 1962: 2nd round, 23rd overall pick
- AFL draft: 1962: 9th round, 68th overall pick

Career history
- Baltimore Colts (1962–1963); Pittsburgh Steelers (1964–1968); Dallas Cowboys (1969)*; New Orleans Saints (1969); Detroit Lions (1970)
- * Offseason or practice squad member only

Career NFL statistics
- Fumble recoveries: 2
- Interceptions: 4
- Sacks: 7
- Stats at Pro Football Reference

William Neal Saul (November 19, 1940 – September 12, 2006) was an American professional football linebacker in the National Football League (NFL) for the Baltimore Colts, Pittsburgh Steelers, New Orleans Saints, and Detroit Lions. He played college football at Penn State University. Saul was the first player to be outfitted with a wireless microphone worn during an NFL game by Jack Newman of NFL Films, the league's in-house filmmaking division.

== Early life ==
Saul attended Butler Senior High School, where he played football, basketball and baseball. He played as a two-way end in football.

He accepted a football scholarship from Penn State University. He was switched from end, to guard, to center. As a senior, he was a backup at center behind Jay Huffman.

He also practiced basketball. In the 1959-60 season, he appeared in 11 games, averaging 6.1 points and 4 rebounds per contest. In the 1960-61 season, he played in one game, posting 2 points and one rebound.

== Professional career ==
Saul was selected by the Baltimore Colts in the second round (23rd overall) of the 1962 NFL draft. He also was selected by the Buffalo Bills in the ninth round (68th overall) of the 1962 AFL draft. As a rookie, he was a backup at linebacker and defensive end. In 1963, he focused on the linebacker position and remained a backup as he gained experience.

On September 7, 1964, he was traded along with rookie halfback Marv Woodson to his hometown Pittsburgh Steelers, in exchange for placekicker Lou Michaels and a third round pick (#36-Glenn Ressler).

In 1964, the Steelers acquired Saul after starter Myron Pottios suffered a broken right arm in the last preseason game. He appeared in 13 games with 10 starts. In 1965, he was placed on the injured reserve list, with a kidney injury that he suffered in the preseason game against the Minnesota Vikings. In 1966, he was named the team's starter at middle linebacker. On December 10, 1967, in an game against the Washington Redskins, he became the first player to wear a wireless microphone during an NFL game.

As part of new head coach Chuck Noll's purging of the roster in his first year, on July 28, 1969, Saul was traded to the Dallas Cowboys, in exchange for an undisclosed future draft choice (not exercised). He was released on September 3. On September 4, the New Orleans Saints acquired his rights from the Cowboys, in exchange for an undisclosed amount of cash.

On September 1, 1970, he was released from the Saints roster. In September, he signed as a free agent with the Detroit Lions. He appeared in 13 games as a backup at middle linebacker.

== Personal life ==
Saul was the older brother of NFL players Rich Saul and Ron Saul. He died on September 12, 2006.
