= James Crockett =

James Crockett may refer to:

- James Crockett (soccer) (1910–1986), U.S. soccer center back
- James "Sonny" Crockett, a fictional character in NBC television series Miami Vice
- James Underwood Crockett (1915–1979), celebrity gardener and author
- Jim Crockett (1909–1973), American wrestling promoter
- Jim Crockett Jr. (1944–2021), American wrestling promoter
