= Homeacre-Lyndora, Pennsylvania =

Unincorporated community in Pennsylvania, US

- Census-designated place
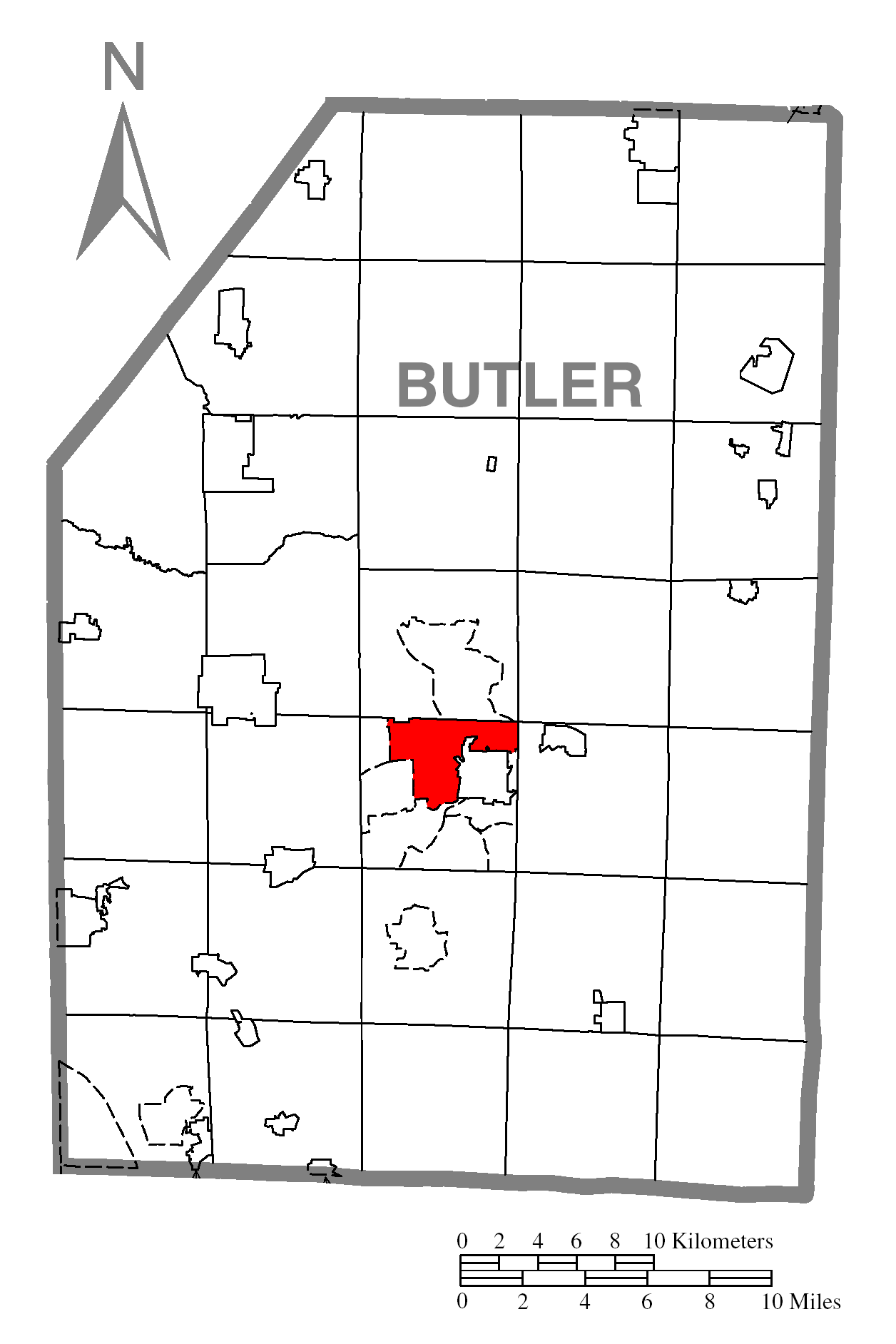
- Location within Butler County

- Location within the U.S. state of Pennsylvania Homeacre-Lyndora (the United States)
- Coordinates: 40°52′10″N 79°55′14″W
- Country: United States
- State: Pennsylvania
- County: Butler
- Township: Butler

Area
  - Total: 6.64 sq mi (17.20 km^{2})
  - Land: 6.64 sq mi (17.20 km^{2})
  - Water: 0 sq mi (0.00 km^{2})

Population (2020)
  - Total: 6,721
  - Density: 1,012/sq mi (390.7/km^{2})
- Time zone: UTC-5 (Eastern (EST))
  - Summer (DST): UTC-4 (EDT)
- FIPS code: 42-35364

Homeacre-Lyndora is a census-designated place (CDP) in Butler County, Pennsylvania, United States. The population was 6,906 at the 2010 census.

== History ==
Lyndora was linked to Butler, Evans City and Pittsburgh in 1908 by the Pittsburgh, Harmony, Butler and New Castle Railway, an interurban trolley line. The line closed on June 15, 1931, and the trolleys were replaced by buses.

== Geography ==
Homeacre-Lyndora occupies a broad portion of central and northern Butler Township, north and west of the city of Butler. The U.S. Census Bureau locates the CDP at 40°52′10″N 79°55′14″W (40.869461, −79.920460), but it consists of several developed areas separated by forested valleys. The Homeacre portion of the CDP is located on high ground west of Butler, while Lyndora is directly adjacent to Butler in the southeast corner of the CDP, in the valley of Connoquenessing Creek. The CDP is bordered by Meridian on the west and by Shanor-Northview in Center Township on the north.

U.S. Route 422, the Benjamin Franklin Highway, passes through the CDP, leading east 22 miles (35 km) to Kittanning and west 25 miles (40 km) to New Castle. Pennsylvania Route 356, New Castle Road, follows the old routing of US-422, leading east into downtown Butler, and joining 422 in the northwestern corner of the CDP. Pennsylvania Route 68 joins PA 356 in the Homeacre part of the CDP, leading east into Butler but traveling west to Connoquenessing, Evans City, and Zelienople. Pennsylvania Route 8 passes through the eastern part of the CDP, interchanging with US 422 and leading south into downtown Butler and north to Harrisville and Franklin.

According to the United States Census Bureau, the CDP has a total area of 6.6 square miles (17.2 km^{2}), all land.

== Demographics ==
Historical population
Census	Pop.	Note	%±
2020	6,721		—
U.S. Decennial Census

As of the 2000 census, there were 6,685 people, 3,077 households, and 1,867 families residing in the CDP. The population density was 1,001.2 inhabitants per square mile (386.6/km^{2}). There were 3,260 housing units at an average density of 488.3 per square mile (188.5/km^{2}). The racial makeup of the CDP was 97.77 percent White, 0.66 percent African American, 0.03 percent Native American, 0.69 percent Asian, 0.04 percent Pacific Islander, 0.13 percent from other races, and 0.67 percent from two or more races. Hispanic or Latino of any race were 0.42 percent of the population.

There were 3,077 households, out of which 21.0 percent had children under the age of 18 living with them, 48.7 percent were married couples living together, 8.5 percent had a female householder with no husband present, and 39.3 percent were non-families. 35.7 percent of all households were made up of individuals, and 19.5 percent had someone living alone who was 65 years of age or older. The average household size was 2.14 and the average family size was 2.77.

In the CDP, the population was spread out, with 18.0 percent under the age of 18, 6.3 percent from 18 to 24, 25.4 percent from 25 to 44, 25.1 percent from 45 to 64, and 25.2 percent who were 65 years of age or older. The median age was 45 years. For every 100 females, there were 92.5 males. For every 100 females age 18 and over, there were 89.8 males.

The median income for a household in the CDP was $32,819, and the median income for a family was $43,136. Males had a median income of $36,804 versus $23,537 for females. The per capita income for the CDP was $20,705. About 7.2 percent of families and 8.3 percent of the population were below the poverty line, including 9.5 percent of those under age 18 and 12.5 percent of those age 65 or over.

== Education ==
The school district is Butler Area School District. Butler Area Intermediate High School and Butler Area Senior High School are the district's comprehensive secondary schools.

== Notable person ==
- Bret Michaels of the heavy metal group Poison
