= Butler Area Senior High School =

Location
- 120 Campus Lane; Butler, Pennsylvania postal address United States
- 40.8641°N 79.9171°W

Information
- School type: Public, Senior high school
- Opened: 1908
- School district: Butler Area School District
- NCES District ID: 4204590
- CEEB code: 390500
- NCES School ID: 420459001147
- Principal: John Wyllie and Jason Huffman
- Faculty: 116.78 (on an FTE basis)
- Grades: 9th - 12th
- Enrollment: 1,968 (2023-2024)
- Student to teacher ratio: 16.85
- Campus type: Open
- Colors: Metallic Gold and White with Blue trims
- Athletics: Baseball, Cross Country, Football, Golf, Hockey, Lacrosse, Rifle, Soccer, Swimming and Diving, Tennis, Track and Field, Volleyball, Wrestling, Softball and marching band
- Athletics conference: Western Pennsylvania Interscholastic Athletic League (W.P.I.A.L.)
- Mascot: Golden Tornado
- Website: www.basdk12.org/1/home

Butler Area Senior High School is a coeducational public senior high school in Butler Township, Butler County, Pennsylvania, United States, serving grades 9–12. The school has a Butler, Pennsylvania post office address. It is the senior high school for the Butler Area School District. The school was founded in 1908, moved to a larger building on an adjacent site in 1917, and moved again to its current site in 1960.

== History ==
Butler Senior High School was originally opened in a yellow-brick building on a site bounded by McKean, East North, Cliff, and New Castle Streets in central Butler. In 1917 it moved to a three-story red-brick building across Cliff Street, the original building becoming the junior high school. In 1937 it was named John A. Gibson High School, in honor of the district superintendent who retired that year. In 1960 it moved again, to a new building on Campus Lane. The 1917 building later became the junior high school, with an annex built in 1994–95 occupying the site of the 1908 building.

Previously Butler Area Senior High had grades 11-12, while the Intermediate High School had grades 9-10, and the Junior High School 7-8. The junior high, later a middle school, closed in 2022. Since then the Intermediate High School took over for middle school/junior high school grades, and the senior high school now has the grade span 9-12.

== Attendance boundary ==
The district (of which this is the sole comprehensive high school) covers the City of Butler, the boroughs of Connoquenessing and East Butler, and the townships of Butler, Center, Clearfield, Connoquenessing, Oakland and Summit. Census-designated places in Butler Township include Homeacre-Lyndora, Meadowood, Meridian, and Oak Hills. CDPs in Center Township include Shanor-Northvue and Unionville.

== Extracurricular programs ==
The Senior High is home to the Butler Golden Tornado athletics teams and offers a variety of clubs, activities and sports.

=== Marching band ===
The Butler Golden Tornado Marching Band marches 175 students, who audition for their places.

=== Junior Reserve Officers Training Corps ===
Butler High School has an Army J.R.O.T.C. program battalion, the Tornado Battalion.

== Notable alumni ==
BSHS alumnus Carl Yankowski as he gives the Palm keynote at the CES

Sports

Major League Baseball

- Matt Clement, former MLB pitcher, All-Star, member of 2007 World Series champion Boston Red Sox
- Milt Graff (1930–2005), former MLB second baseman for the Kansas City Athletics (1957–1958)
- John Stuper, former MLB pitcher for the St. Louis Cardinals (1982–1985) and Cincinnati Reds (1985) and current coach of the Yale Bulldogs
- Ed Vargo (1928–2008), MLB umpire (1960s-1970s)

National Football League

- Rich Bartlewski, former NFL tight end for the Los Angeles Raiders (1990) and Atlanta Falcons (1991)
- Tom Brown (1921–2013), former NFL tight end for the Pittsburgh Steelers (1942)
- Terry Hanratty, former American football quarterback who played in college at Notre Dame and in the NFL during the 1960s and 1970s, earned two Super Bowl rings with the Pittsburgh Steelers
- Scott Milanovich, former NFL, NFL Europe, XFL, AFL, and CFL quarterback. Coached multiple CFL teams and is the head coach for the Edmonton Eskimos
- Bill Saul (1940–2006), former NFL linebacker for multiple teams (1962–1970). Older brother of Rich and Ron.
- Rich Saul (1948–2012), former NFL center lineman for the Los Angeles Rams (1970–1981). Six-time Pro Bowler. Younger brother of Bill, twin brother of Ron.
- Ron Saul, former NFL guard lineman for the Houston Oilers (1970–1975) and Washington Redskins (1976–1981). Younger brother of Bill, twin brother of Rich.
- Paul Uram (1927–2017), American former gymnastics and flexibility coach, member of the U.S. Gymanstics Hall of Fame, coached on four Super Bowl-winning teams with the Pittsburgh Steelers

Sports, other

- Jake Hildebrand, ECHL hockey player for the Kalamazoo Wings
- Harry Holiday, world record-setting swimmer and Armco CEO
- Brian Minto, former heavyweight boxer (2002–2016)
- John Minton (1948–1995), former professional wrestler known by the name Big John Studd. Winner of multiple championship titles. Inductee of the WCW and WWE Hall of fame.
- Eric Namesnik (1970–2006), two-time silver medalist Olympic swimmer for men's 400-meter individual relay (1992 & 1996)
- David Pichler, Olympic diver (1996 & 2000), dive team captain in 2000, did not place
- Meghan Schnur, is an NSCAA All-American for University of Connecticut (2007) and an American soccer midfielder currently playing for Sky Blue FC of Women's Professional Soccer and member of the United States U-23 women's national soccer team.

Film, Stage & Television

- Chester Aaron (1932–2019), author with over two dozen publications
- Marc Blucas, actor, best known by his portrayal of Riley Finn in Buffy the Vampire Slayer
- Joan Chandler (1923–1979), actress, best known for her roles in Alfred Hitchcock's Rope (1948) with James Stewart and Humoresque (1946) with Joan Crawford.
- Josie Carey (1930–2004), the host of The Children's Corner on WQED in Pittsburgh. Fred Rogers was a puppeteer and musician on her show for seven years before creating Mister Rogers' Neighborhood.
- Barbara Feldon, actress and model, best known for her portrayal of Agent 99 of the TV series Get Smart
- Joe Fishel (living), actor
- Grace Gealey, actress, portrayed 'Anika' on the Fox series Empire
- Fred McCarren (1951–2006), actor, best known for his roles in Amanda's (1983) and Hill Street Blues (1984).

Music

- Glenn Crytzer, band leader and composer
- Jim Pugh, jazz trombonist and composer. Distinguished Professor of Jazz Trombone at University of Illinois at Urbana–Champaign. Formerly played with Steely Dan's touring band.
- William Purvis, French horn player, conductor and Musical Instruments Director at Yale University

Public Office and Military

- Gibson E. Armstrong, former Republican PA State Representative for the 100th district (1977–1984) and PA State Senator for the 13th district (1984–2009)
- Judge William G. Bassler, former United States district judge of the United States District Court for the District of New Jersey (1991–2006)
- Brian Ellis, former Republican PA State Representative for the 11th House district (2005–2019)
- Admiral Jonathan W. Greenert, former Chief of Naval Operations for the U.S. Navy (2011–2015)
- Mike Kelly, local businessman and representative for Pennsylvania's 16th congressional district
- Donald Oesterling (1927–2013), former Democratic PA State Senator
- William J. Perry, American mathematician, engineer, businessman, and civil servant who was the United States Secretary of Defense under President Bill Clinton
- Rick Santorum, American politician, attorney, and political commentator, former United States Senator from Pennsylvania
- Peter Talleri, retired U.S. Marine Corps major general

Technology

- Jay Last, physicist, silicon pioneer, and member of the Traitorous Eight, founding father of Silicon Valley
- Carl Yankowski, businessman and former CEO of Palm, Inc. and Ambient Devices.

Other

- Daniel D'Aniello, billionaire businessman who co-founded and chaired The Carlyle Group
