= Butler Area School District =

School district in Pennsylvania, US

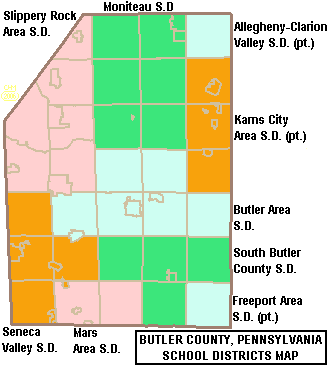

Address
- 110 Campus Lane North Eastern United States Butler, (Butler County), Pennsylvania, 16001; United States
- Coordinates: 40.8664°N 79.9204°W

District information
- Type: Public
- Grades: K–12
- NCES District ID: 4204590

Students and staff
- Enrollment: 6,058 (2022–23)
- Teachers: 428.60 (FTE)
- Student–teacher ratio: 14.13
- District mascot: Tuffy the Tornado
- Colors: White & Gold with Blue

Other information
- Website: www.basdk12.org

The Butler Area School District (BASD) is a school district in western Pennsylvania, headquartered in Butler Township, Butler County; the office has a Butler postal address. It encompasses approximately 150 square miles (390 km^{2}) and operates ten schools.

The 2006 enrollment for elementary students was 4,310 students and for secondary schools was 3,946 students.

== History ==
The first Butler area public school, "the Little Red Schoolhouse" opened in 1838 as a result of the Pennsylvania Free Public School Act of 1834. In 1854, a bill establishing a system of Superintendents in Pennsylvania was established which lead to the appointment of the county's first superintendent, Isaac Black. In an 1856 report, Superintendent Black reported that 84 of the county's 182 school-houses "were unfit to enter" while 57 "were tolerable". The Butler County Teacher's Institute, established in 1855, determined which resources were to be used in the classrooms. The first Butler area high school was originally built in 1908 and became a middle school in 1917 until the building was closed in 1985 and razed in 1987. By 1963, all of the county's one-room school-houses had closed. In 2015, the board of trustees voted to close five elementary schools. Six board members voted in favor, and three voted against.

== Boundary ==
The district covers the City of Butler, the boroughs of Connoquenessing and East Butler, and the townships of Butler, Center, Clearfield, Connoquenessing, Oakland and Summit. Census-designated places in Butler Township include Homeacre-Lyndora, Meadowood, Meridian, and Oak Hills. CDPs in Center Township include Shanor-Northvue and Unionville.

== Schools ==
Elementary Schools (K–5)

- Broad Street Elementary School – Butler City
  - It closed in 2015. In 2017 Summit Township Elementary School used the Broad Street facility on a temporary basis. However, in 2021 the board of trustees voted to begin using Broad Street as a school again.
- Center Township Elementary School – Center Township
- Connoquenessing Elementary School – Connoquenessing Township
- Emily Brittain Elementary School – Butler City
- McQuistion Elementary School – Butler Township
- Northwest Elementary School – Butler Township
- Summit Elementary School – Summit Township

Secondary schools

- Butler Intermediate High School (6-8) – Butler Township
- Butler Area Senior High School (9-12) – Butler Township

Special school

- Center Avenue Community School (grades K–12) – Butler City. It is for students who are disabled; it was a traditional elementary school prior to 2015.

=== Former schools ===
The district chose to close the following schools in 2015:

- Center Avenue Elementary School – Butler City
- Clearfield Township Elementary School – Clearfield Township
- Meridian Elementary School – Meridian in Butler Township
- Oakland Township Elementary School – Oakland Township

Another former school:

- Butler Area Junior High School, later Butler Middle School, closed in 2022 – Butler City
