= Tom Brown (end) =

American football player (1921–2013)

No. 32
- Position: End

Personal information
- Born: May 22, 1921; Pittsburgh, Pennsylvania, U.S.
- Died: June 4, 2013 (aged 92); Brecksville, Ohio, U.S.
- Listed height: 6 ft 2 in (1.88 m)
- Listed weight: 216 lb (98 kg)

Career information
- High school: Butler (PA)
- College: William & Mary

Career history
- Pittsburgh Steelers (1942)

Career statistics
- Games played: 9
- Receptions: 4
- Receiving yards: 69
- Stats at Pro Football Reference

Thomas McClaren Brown (May 22, 1921 – June 4, 2013) was an American professional football player for the National Football League's Pittsburgh Steelers. His position was end. He played in nine games in the 1942 season after his collegiate career at William & Mary.
