= Ron Saul =

American football player (1948–2021)

No. 64
- Position: Guard

Personal information
- Born: February 5, 1948; Butler, Pennsylvania, U.S.
- Died: June 16, 2021 (aged 73)
- Listed height: 6 ft 2 in (1.88 m)
- Listed weight: 255 lb (116 kg)

Career information
- High school: Butler (PA)
- College: Michigan State
- NFL draft: 1970: 5th round, 110th overall pick

Career history
- Houston Oilers (1970–1975); Washington Redskins (1976–1981)

Awards and highlights
- Super Bowl champion (XVII); First-team All-American (1969); First-team All-Big Ten (1969); Second-team All-Big Ten (1968)

Career NFL statistics
- Games played: 142
- Games started: 91
- Fumble recoveries: 4
- Stats at Pro Football Reference

Ronald Reed Saul (February 5, 1948 – June 16, 2021) was an American professional football player who was an offensive lineman in the National Football League (NFL) for the Houston Oilers and the Washington Redskins. He played college football at Michigan State University and was drafted 110th overall in the fifth round of the 1970 NFL draft.

Ron had two brothers that also played in the NFL; his older brother Bill Saul, and his twin brother Rich Saul, who also played for Michigan State.
