= Herman, Pennsylvania =

Unincorporated community in Pennsylvania, US

- Unincorporated community
- Location within Pennsylvania
- Coordinates: 40°49′48″N 79°48′40″W
- Country: United States
- State: Pennsylvania
- County: Butler
- Township: Summit
- Elevation: 1,276 ft (389 m)
- Time zone: UTC-5 (Eastern (EST))
  - Summer (DST): UTC-4 (EDT)
- ZIP code: 16039
- Area code: 724
- GNIS feature ID: 1176869

Herman is an unincorporated community in Summit Township, Butler County, Pennsylvania, United States. Its ZIP code is 16039 (PO Box).
