= Laning Harvey =

American politician (1882–1942)

Member of the Pennsylvania Senate from the 21st district
- In office 1929–1936
- Preceded by: Sterling Ross Catlin
- Succeeded by: Leo C. Mundy

Personal details
- Born: February 17, 1882 Wilkes-Barre, Pennsylvania, U.S.
- Died: August 4, 1942 (aged 60) Wilkes-Barre, Pennsylvania, U.S.
- Party: Republican

Laning Harvey (February 17, 1882 – August 4, 1942) was an American politician from Pennsylvania who served as a Republican member of the Pennsylvania Senate for the 21st district from 1929 to 1936.

== Early life and education ==
He was born on February 17, 1882, in Wilkes-Barre, Pennsylvania, to William Jameson and Amanda (Laning) Harvey. He was educated at Wilkes-Barre Academy and graduated from The Hill School in 1903.

== Business career ==
Harvey was a director at the Miners Savings Bank and was the founder and vice president of the Henry German Company.

== Political career ==
He was appointed to the Pennsylvania State Game Commission under Governors Edwin Stuart and John K. Tener. He served on the State Board of Public Charities under Governor Martin Brumbaugh and on the Public Welfare Board under Governor William Sproul. He was a member of the Wilkes-Barre City Council for four years.

He was elected to the Pennsylvania Senate for the 21st district and served from 1929 to 1936.

He died on August 4, 1942, and is interred at the Hollenback Cemetery in Wilkes-Barre, Pennsylvania.
