= Unionville, Butler County, Pennsylvania =

Unincorporated community in Pennsylvania, US

Unionville
- Unincorporated community Census designated place
- Location within Pennsylvania Location within the United States
- Coordinates: 40°56′29″N 79°57′43″W
- Country: United States
- State: Pennsylvania
- County: Butler
- Township: Center

Area
  - Total: 2.6 sq mi (6.7 km^{2})
  - Land: 2.6 sq mi (6.7 km^{2})
  - Water: 0 sq mi (0.0 km^{2})
- Elevation: 1,283 ft (391 m)

Population (2010)
  - Total: 962
  - Density: 375/sq mi (144.6/km^{2})
- Time zone: UTC-5 (Eastern (EST))
  - Summer (DST): UTC-4 (EDT)
- FIPS code: 4278608
- GNIS feature ID: 2633671

Unionville is a census-designated place located in Center Township, Butler County, in the U.S. state of Pennsylvania. As of the 2010 census, the population was 962.

Unionville is located in the northwestern corner of Center Township and is bordered to the southwest by the Shanor-Northvue CDP, to the north by Clay Township and to the west by Franklin Township. Pennsylvania Route 8 passes through the community, leading south 6 miles (10 km) to Butler, the county seat, and north 14 miles (23 km) to Harrisville.

== Demographics ==
Historical population
Census	Pop.	Note	%±
2010	962		—
U.S. Decennial Census

== Education ==
It is in the Butler Area School District. Butler Area Intermediate High School and Butler Area Senior High School are the district's comprehensive secondary schools.
