= Shanor-Northvue, Pennsylvania =

Unincorporated community in Pennsylvania, US

- Census-designated place
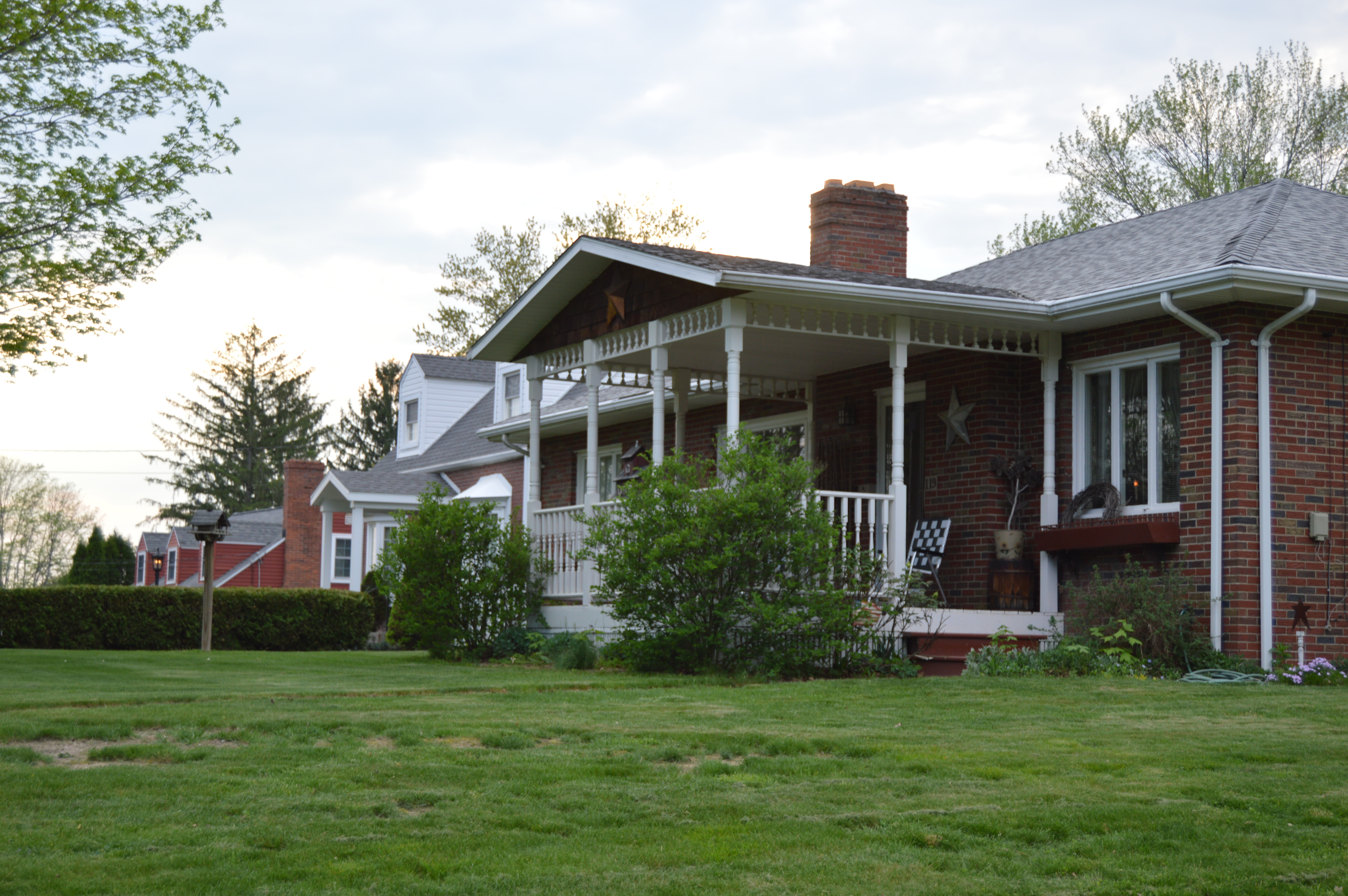
- Houses on Mayfield Drive

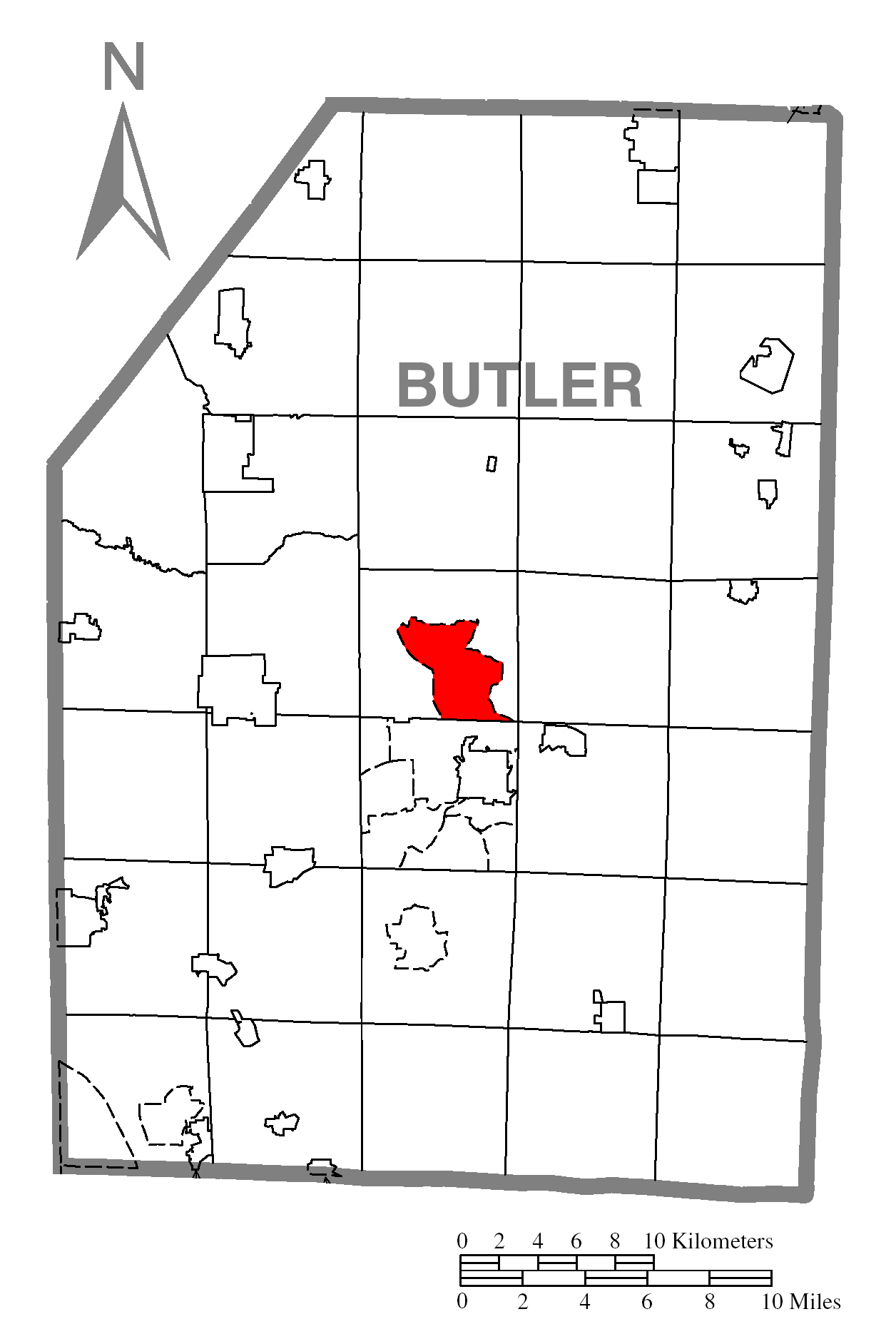
- Location within Butler County

- Location within the U.S. state of Pennsylvania Shanor-Northvue (the United States)
- Coordinates: 40°54′13″N 79°54′30″W
- Country: United States
- State: Pennsylvania
- County: Butler
- Township: Center

Area
  - Total: 6.78 sq mi (17.55 km^{2})
  - Land: 6.75 sq mi (17.49 km^{2})
  - Water: 0.023 sq mi (0.06 km^{2})
- Elevation: 1,340 ft (410 m)

Population (2010)
  - Total: 5,051
  - Density: 288.8/sq mi (111.5/km^{2})
- Time zone: UTC-5 (Eastern (EST))
  - Summer (DST): UTC-4 (EDT)
- ZIP code: 16001

Shanor-Northvue is a census-designated place (CDP) in Butler County, Pennsylvania, United States. The population was 5,051 at the 2010 census.

== Geography ==
Shanor-Northvue occupies the central and south-central portions of Center Township in Butler County and is located at 40°54′13″N 79°54′30″W (40.903647, −79.908405). It consists of residential areas outside the city of Butler that include Shanor Heights, Windward Heights, Timberly Heights, Northvue, and part of Fisher Heights. The Clearview Mall is located in Shanor Heights. Shanor-Northvue is bordered to the south by the Homeacre-Lyndora CDP in Butler Township.

Pennsylvania Route 8 is the main road through the CDP, leading south 3 miles (5 km) to downtown Butler and north 18 miles (29 km) to Harrisville.

According to the United States Census Bureau, Shanor-Northview has a total area of 6.8 square miles (17.5 km^{2}), of which 0.023 square miles (0.06 km^{2}), or 0.33%, is water.

== Demographics ==
As of the 2000 census, there were 4,825 people, 1,997 households, and 1,373 families living in the CDP. The population density was 718.1 people per square mile (277.3 people/km^{2}). There were 2,093 housing units at an average density of 311.5 per square mile (120.3/km^{2}). The racial makeup of the CDP was 98.18% White, 0.39% African American, 0.02% Native American, 0.66% Asian, 0.02% Pacific Islander, 0.25% from other races, and 0.48% from two or more races. Hispanic or Latino of any race were 0.44% of the population.

There were 1,997 households, out of which 28.1% had children under the age of 18 living with them, 60.5% were married couples living together, 6.4% had a female householder with no husband present, and 31.2% were non-families. 28.3% of all households were made up of individuals, and 16.5% had someone living alone who was 65 years of age or older. The average household size was 2.36 and the average family size was 2.91.

In the CDP the population was spread out, with 21.7% under the age of 18, 5.8% from 18 to 24, 25.1% from 25 to 44, 26.0% from 45 to 64, and 21.4% who were 65 years of age or older. The median age was 43 years. For every 100 females there were 86.7 males. For every 100 females age 18 and over, there were 81.9 males.

The median income for a household in the CDP was $43,158, and the median income for a family was $53,426. Males had a median income of $45,000 versus $27,067 for females. The per capita income for the CDP was $23,852. About 2.0% of families and 5.1% of the population were below the poverty line, including 4.8% of those under age 18 and 5.8% of those age 65 or over.

== Education ==
It is in the Butler Area School District.

The CDP is home to Center Township Elementary School (which has a Butler postal address). Butler Area Intermediate High School and Butler Area Senior High School are the district's comprehensive secondary schools.
