= James Crockett (soccer) =

American soccer player

Personal information
- Date of birth: February 17, 1910
- Date of death: July 30, 1986 (aged 76)
- Place of death: Meadowood, Pennsylvania, United States
- Position: Center back

Senior career*
Years	Team	Apps	(Gls)
- Philadelphia German-Americans

International career
1936	United States	1	(0)
- * Club domestic league appearances and goals

James Crockett (February 17, 1910 – July 30, 1986) was a U.S. soccer center back who was a member of the U.S. soccer team at the 1936 Summer Olympics.

Crockett was selected as a member of the U.S. soccer team at the 1936 Olympic Games. He played in the only U.S. game of the tournament, a 1–0 loss to Italy. At the time, he played for the Philadelphia German-Americans of the American Soccer League. In 1936, Crockett and his teammates defeated the St. Louis Shamrocks in the National Challenge Cup.

He died in Meadowood, Pennsylvania.
