= Wilkes-Barre Academy =

Defunct school in Pennsylvania, United States

Information
- Established: 1807
- Closed: 1838 (became Wyoming Academy)

Wilkes-Barre Academy was a private school in Wilkes-Barre, Pennsylvania, established in 1807. The school had numerous prominent alumni, including several politicians.

== History ==
An old courthouse building was used before it became the Wyoming Academy, and a new brick building was constructed. Female students occupied two rooms in the school's building before the Girls' Institute was established.

In 1838, the school became Wyoming Academy.

Miner-Hillard Milling Company was a major business in the area. Many students came to the school from outside the immediate area.

== Alumni ==
- Benjamin A. Bidlack (1804–1849), politician
- George Catlin (1796–1872), artist
- George Denison (1790–1831), U.S. Representative
- Laning Harvey (1882–1942), Pennsylvania state senator
- Ovid F. Johnson (1807–1854), attorney general
- Charles Abbott Miner (1830–1903), state representative
- George Washington Woodward (1809–1875), U.S. Congressman
- Hendrick B. Wright (1808–1881), state politician
