= W. Thomas Andrews =

American politician (1941–2009)

Member of the Pennsylvania Senate from the 21st district
- In office January 4, 1973 – November 30, 1980
- Preceded by: Donald Oesterling
- Succeeded by: Tim Shaffer

Personal details
- Born: November 8, 1941 New Castle, Pennsylvania, United States
- Died: September 14, 2009 (aged 67) New Castle, Pennsylvania, United States

W. Thomas Andrews (November 8, 1941 - September 14, 2009) was an American politician from Pennsylvania who served as a Republican member of the Pennsylvania State Senate for the 21st district from 1973 to 1980.

== Early life and education ==
Andrews was born November 8, 1941, in New Castle, Pennsylvania, to Ralph and Mary Andrews. He graduated from Mohawk High School in 1959 and received a B.A. degree from the College of Wooster in 1963 and a L.L.B from the University of Pittsburgh School of Law in 1966.

== Career ==
He was admitted to the state bar association in 1966 and began private law practice. He served as district attorney for Lawrence County from 1970 to 1972. He served in the Pennsylvania Senate for the 21st district from 1973 to 1980.

After his service in the state Senate, he returned to private practice and became a certified financial planner.
