= Tim Shaffer =

American politician (1945–2022)

Member of the Pennsylvania Senate from the 21st district
- In office January 6, 1981 – November 30, 1996
- Preceded by: Thomas Andrews
- Succeeded by: Mary Jo White

Personal details
- Born: October 2, 1945 Butler, Pennsylvania, United States
- Died: May 3, 2022 (aged 76) Prospect, Pennsylvania, United States

Charles Timothy Shaffer (October 2, 1945 – May 3, 2022) was an American judge and politician from Pennsylvania who served as a Republican member of the Pennsylvania State Senate for the 21st district from 1981 to 1996.

== Formative years ==
Born on October 2, 1945, in Butler, Pennsylvania, Shaffer served as a lieutenant in the U.S. Army during the Vietnam War.

== Public service career ==
Elected as a Republican to the Pennsylvania State Senate for the 21st district, he served in that legislative body from 1981 to 1996.

In May 2010, Shaffer was nominated by Governor Ed Rendell to serve as a judge for the Butler County Magisterial District. He was confirmed by the Pennsylvania Senate and served until his retirement in December 2015.

== Final years and death ==
Shaffer owned an historic farmhouse, where he spent a significant portion of his time during his later years. Built in 1830, it was located in Prospect, Pennsylvania. He died there on May 3, 2022, at the age of seventy-six.

== Legacy ==
In 2018, Butler County Community College created The Shaffer School of Nursing and Allied Health after Shaffer donated $1 million to the school.

He was also a vital part in the founding of the Prospect Area Preservation Society which now houses many artifacts from his life that he personally donated through his time with the organization.
