= Mary Jo White (Pennsylvania politician) =

American politician (1941–2025)

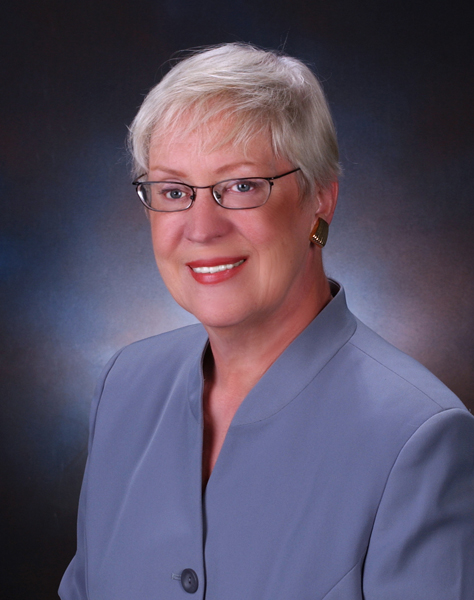

Member of the Pennsylvania Senate from the 21st district
- In office January 7, 1997 – January 1, 2013
- Preceded by: Tim Shaffer
- Succeeded by: Scott Hutchinson

Personal details
- Born: December 27, 1941 Chicago, Illinois, U.S.
- Died: February 21, 2025 (aged 83)
- Party: Republican
- Spouse: H. William White Jr. (m. 1967)
- Children: 3
- Education: Quincy University, University of Pittsburgh School of Law

Mary Jo White (née Ransford; December 27, 1941 – February 21, 2025) was an American politician who served as a Republican member of the Pennsylvania State Senate for the 21st District from 1997 to 2013.

== Background ==
White was born in Chicago, Illinois, on December 27, 1941, one of five children born to Joseph and Patricia Ransford. She graduated from Aquinas High School in 1959 and received a B.A. degree from Quincy University in 1963 and a J.D. from the University of Pittsburgh School of Law in 1967.

== Career ==
White served as a public defender for Venango County, Pennsylvania from 1974 to 1976. From 1977 to 2007 she was the Corporate Secretary and Vice-President for Environmental/Government Affairs for Quaker State Oil Corp.

She was elected to the Pennsylvania Senate for the 21st district and served from 1997 to 2013. She chaired the Senate Environmental Committee for 12 years and was the first woman elected to the Republican Leadership in 2011. She was considered an expert on issues involving the environment and land use." She worked as Trustee Emerita for the Board of Trustees for the University of Pittsburgh and as a member of the Pitt Public Health Board of Visitors from 2007 to 2020.

== Death ==
White died on February 21, 2025, at the age of 83. She was survived by her husband, H. William White Jr., a Venango County judge, and their three children.
