= Peter Talleri =

United States Marine Corps general

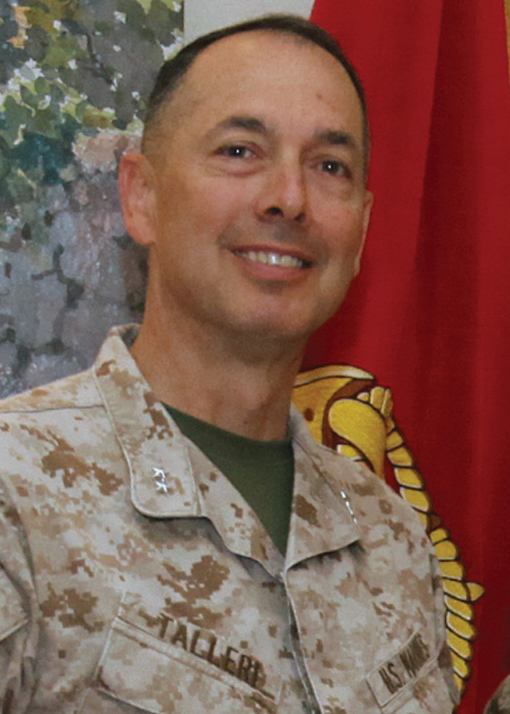
Peter Talleri in May 2011

Major General Peter John Talleri retired in September, 2013, after serving 34 years in the United States Marine Corps. At retirement, Maj. Gen. Talleri was the U. S. Marine Corps senior logistics professional in the Pacific.

In 2008, Maj. Gen. Talleri was awarded the Distinguished Achievement award at Clarion University of Pennsylvania. Other recipients include Kurt Angle (Professional Wrestler), John Calipari (Basketball Coach), Pete Vuckovich (MLB) and Reggie Wells Jr (NFL).

In 2013, Maj. Gen. Talleri was a recipient of the National Safety Council's “CEOs Who Get It” award along with David Seaton, Chairman and CEO of Fluor.

In 2022, Maj. Gen. Talleri received the Butler, PA “Hometown Football Hero Award.” Other receipts include NFL players Terry Hanratty and brothers Rich and Ron Saul. His hometown of Butler also honored him with “Major General Peter Talleri” day on Aug 25, 2022.

== Early life ==
Maj. Gen. Talleri was born in Butler, Pennsylvania in 1957. He is the oldest of four children to native Pennsylvania parents. His father retired from the United States Air Force.

== Marine Corps Career ==
Maj. Gen. Talleri entered the United States Marine Corps in 1979 as a Second Lieutenant. During his military career, he commanded and led logistics units from the platoon to national level; across the full range of combat and joint operational capabilities. He also held critical staff positions at the U. S. Central Command (CENTCOM) and the United States Marine Forces Central Command. While at CENTCOM, he was responsible for the information technology logistical planning efforts during Operation Iraqi Freedom and Operation Enduring Freedom. This included providing operational plans to ensure that total asset visibility was accomplished during the war. Operation Iraqi Freedom was the first time "Active RFID" was used on a strategic scale.

== Private Sector Career ==
Maj. Gen. Talleri is currently President at Peter J. Talleri & Associates, and a strategic advisor with Stellar Solutions and HDT Global. He is also on boards at the Clarion University Foundation, Airborne Motorworks, The Jandor Group, Soldiers to Civilians and DiviUp. He is also the Honorary Chairman of the Steel-City Marine Corps Scholarship Foundation.

== Education ==
Maj. Gen. Talleri is a 1975 graduate of Butler Area Senior High School. He received his bachelor's degree in business management from Clarion State College in Clarion, PA in 1979 and is currently a member of the Clarion University Foundation Board. Talleri earned his first master's degree in business management from Florida Institute of Technology in Melbourne, Florida in 1994. He earned another master's degree in national resource strategy from the Industrial College of the Armed Forces in Washington D.C. in 2001.

== Military Awards ==
Maj. Gen. Talleri has earned the Navy Distinguished Service Medal, the Defense Superior Service Medal (two awards), the Legion of Merit (two awards), the Defense Meritorious Service Medal, the Meritorious Service Medal (three awards), the Navy and Marine Corps Commendation Medal (three awards), the Joint Service Achievement Medal, the Navy and Marine Corps Achievement Medal, the Iraq Campaign Medal, the Armed Forces Expeditionary Medal, the Humanitarian Service Medal, the Afghanistan Campaign Medal, the National Defense Service Medal with bronze star, the Global War on Terrorism Expeditionary Medal with bronze star, the Global War on Terrorism Service Medal, the Joint Meritorious Unit Award, the Navy Meritorious Unit Commendation, the Navy Unit Commendation, the Sea Service Deployment Ribbon, the Navy and Marine Corps Overseas Service Ribbon, the Korean Defense Service Medal, and the Marine Corps Recruiting Service Ribbon. In 2008, the Clarion University Alumni Association presented him with the Distinguished Achievement Award.

- Navy Distinguished Service Medal
- Defense Superior Service Medal with Gold Star
- Legion of Merit with Gold Star
- Defense Meritorious Service Medal
- Meritorious Service Medal with two Gold Stars
- Navy and Marine Corps Commendation Medal with two Gold Stars
- Joint Service Achievement Medal
- Navy and Marine Corps Achievement Medal
- National Defense Service Medal with bronze star
- Iraq Campaign Medal
- | Armed Forces Expeditionary Medal
- Humanitarian Service Medal
- Afghanistan Campaign Medal
- Global War on Terrorism Expeditionary Medal
- Global War on Terrorism Service Medal
- Joint Meritorious Unit Award
- Navy Unit Commendation
- Navy Sea Service Deployment Ribbon with eight stars
- Navy and Marine Corps Overseas Service Ribbon
- Marine Corps Recruiting Ribbon
- Korea Defense Service Medal
- Navy Meritorious Unit Commendation
