= Carl Yankowski =

American businessman (1948–2023)

- Yankowski at CES in 2010
- Born: July 22, 1948; Butler, Pennsylvania, U.S.
- Died: May 13, 2023 (aged 74); Butler, Pennsylvania, U.S.
- Education: Massachusetts Institute of Technology (SB); MIT Sloan School of Management (SB)
- Occupations: Former CEO, Palm, Inc., Ambient Devices

Carl J. Yankowski (July 22, 1948 – May 13, 2023) was an American businessman who was the CEO of Palm, Inc. and Ambient Devices.

== Early life ==
Yankowski was born on July 22, 1948, in Butler, Pennsylvania, the son of Helen Margaret (Miseyka) and Mitchel Carl Yankowski. Yankowski attended Butler Senior High School in Butler, Pennsylvania, graduating in 1966. He gained simultaneous degrees in electrical engineering from the Massachusetts Institute of Technology and management from the MIT Sloan School of Management. He also took a humanities minor in Art History at Wellesley College, as one of the first men to attend.

== Career ==
=== Early career ===
Upon graduation he worked as a systems analyst for Procter & Gamble but discovered that he enjoyed leveraging both marketing and technology. He developed new products and promotional campaigns for Pringles and Duncan Hines mixes. He then moved to Memorex where he helped develop the first high-performance cassette tapes, and with Ella Fitzgerald worked on the "Is It Live Or Is It Memorex" campaign before joining Pepsi, expanding Mountain Dew, launching 2L plastic bottles and back-lit vending machines, and working on the three-year Pepsi Challenge campaign for PepsiCo, beating Coke in market share for the first consistent time.

At General Electric, he helped develop the Spacemaker range with its "We Bring Good Things to Life" campaign. He then worked in the U.S. and London as divisional CEO of Cadbury Schweppes, focused on new soft drink delivery systems.

=== Polaroid ===
Yankowski joined Polaroid Corporation in 1988 as a corporate vice president with initial responsibility for all business imaging, U.S. consumer and industrial marketing before moving to Hong Kong as group vice president for the corporation's Asia/Pacific region. He then returned to the United States to become the president and CEO of Sony Electronics in November 1993, almost doubling the U.S. businesses by $5 billion, and launching PlayStation, VAIO, CDMA phones, and DVD, as well as DirectTV, Web TV, and others. Yankowski left Sony in January 1998 "to address immediate family health issues" (his father was dying). He became president and chief executive officer of the Reebok Brand in September 1998, initiating cost-cutting and a turnaround, as well as a re-focus on women and fitness.

=== Palm ===
Yankowski joined 3Com to head its Palm division on 13 December 1999. In his first year at Palm, he became chief executive officer, transforming the division of 3Com into a public company with a billion-dollar+ IPO and market capitalization of US$30 billion.

Yankowski gained notoriety for his appearance on a CNBC interview on the day of the Palm IPO, during which he wore a bespoke suit embroidered with gold pinstripes. Profitable revenue increased five consecutive quarters to over $1 billion as the dot-com bubble collapsed. He left Palm on 8 November 2001 when the OS Group was spun out by the board (leaving Palm a commodity hardware player), and most technology companies were caught up in the dot-com crash, and set up a management consultancy under the name 'Westerham Group'. He led Majesco (a gaming company) for a ten-month period until he discovered the recent sales forecasts for Psychonauts and Advent Rising were dramatically missed in this essentially family-owned business. From June 2001 until February 2003 he was a director of Novell and chairman of the board for CRF Health, then a start-up company focusing on electronic patient diaries for clinical trials. From July 2003 he was a non-executive director of Informatica and Chase Corporation.

=== Ambient Devices ===
After Palm, he took up positions on the boards of the Boston College business school and the MIT Sloan School of Management and several technology and consumer product-oriented companies. In 2007, he was appointed CEO of Ambient Devices, a small consumer electronics company based in Cambridge, Massachusetts, raising funding, developing more contemporary new products, distribution, and marketing. He was asked to remove himself from the company.

=== Other companies ===
Yankowski was a board member of flat-panel color display pioneer Uni-Pixel, Inc. (UNXL), which has developed a potentially more efficient display method called TMOS, as well as non-fingerprint films, and unique embossing technology for touch screens and similar applications. He also represented Intel Capital on the board of Telligent in Dallas, a leading corporate social networking and analytics company.

== Death ==
Yankowski died in Butler, Pennsylvania, on May 13, 2023, aged 74.

== In media ==
Yankowski is portrayed by English actor Cary Elwes in the 2023 biopic BlackBerry, directed by Matt Johnson.
