= Oak Hills, Pennsylvania =

Unincorporated community in Pennsylvania, US

- Census-designated place
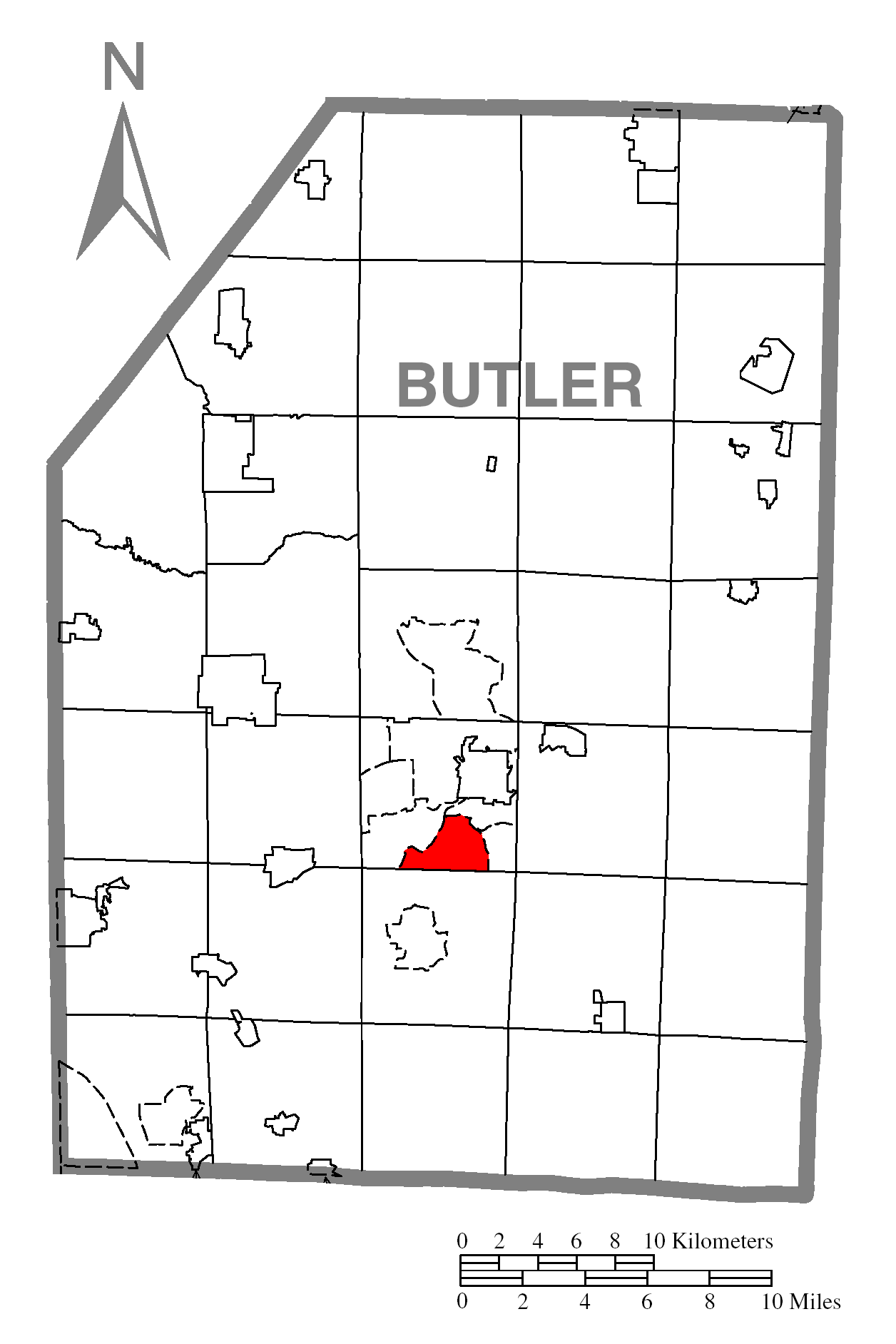
- Location within Butler County

- Location within the U.S. state of Pennsylvania Oak Hills (the United States)
- Coordinates: 40°49′30″N 79°55′8″W
- Country: United States
- State: Pennsylvania
- County: Butler
- Township: Butler

Area
  - Total: 3.37 sq mi (8.72 km^{2})
  - Land: 3.37 sq mi (8.72 km^{2})
  - Water: 0 sq mi (0.00 km^{2})
- Elevation: 1,230 ft (370 m)

Population (2020)
  - Total: 2,382
  - Density: 707.1/sq mi (273.02/km^{2})
- Time zone: UTC-5 (Eastern (EST))
  - Summer (DST): UTC-4 (EDT)
- FIPS code: 42-55969

Oak Hills is a census-designated place (CDP) in Butler County, Pennsylvania, United States. The population was 2,333 at the 2010 census.

== Geography ==
Oak Hills is located in the southern part of Butler Township at 40°49′30″N 79°55′8″W (40.825041, −79.918853). It is bordered to the northeast by Meadowood. The northwestern boundary of the CDP follows Connoquenessing Creek. Pennsylvania Route 8 passes through the CDP, leading north 4 miles (6 km) to downtown Butler and south 29 miles (47 km) to downtown Pittsburgh.

Butler County Community College is located in Oak Hills.

According to the United States Census Bureau, the CDP has a total area of 3.4 square miles (8.7 km^{2}), all land.

== Demographics ==
Historical population
Census	Pop.	Note	%±
2020	2,382		—
U.S. Decennial Census

As of the 2000 census, there were 2,335 people, 948 households, and 663 families living in the CDP. The population density was 723.4 inhabitants per square mile (279.3/km^{2}). There were 973 housing units at an average density of 301.5 per square mile (116.4/km^{2}). The racial makeup of the CDP was 98.46% White, 0.47% African American (roughly 11 individuals), 0.04% Native American (roughly 1 individual), 0.43% Asian, 0.09% Pacific Islander, 0.09% from other races, and 0.43% from two or more races. Hispanic or Latino of any race were 0.73% of the population.

There were 948 households, out of which 33.2% had children under the age of 18 living with them, 57.0% were married couples living together, 10.0% had a female householder with no husband present, and 30.0% were non-families. 26.2% of all households were made up of individuals, and 9.2% had someone living alone who was 65 years of age or older. The average household size was 2.46 individuals and the average family size was 2.98 individuals.

In the CDP, the population was spread out, with 25.0% under the age of 18, 7.2% from 18 to 24, 26.1% from 25 to 44, 27.2% from 45 to 64, and 14.6% who were 65 years of age or older. The median age was 40 years. For every 100 females, there were 90.6 males. For every 100 females age 18 and over, there were 88.0 males.

The median income for a household in the CDP was $46,078, and the median income for a family was $56,447. Males had a median income of $52,500 versus $32,083 for females. The per capita income for the CDP was $22,106. About 6.3% of families and 10.0% of the population were below the poverty line, including 14.3% of those under age 18 and 7.4% of those age 65 or over.

== Education ==
The school district is Butler Area School District. Butler Area Intermediate High School and Butler Area Senior High School are the district's comprehensive secondary schools.
