= Rich Saul =

American football player (1948–2012)

No. 61
- Positions: Center, long snapper

Personal information
- Born: February 5, 1948; Butler, Pennsylvania, U.S.
- Died: April 15, 2012 (aged 64); Newport Beach, California, U.S.
- Listed height: 6 ft 3 in (1.91 m)
- Listed weight: 241 lb (109 kg)

Career information
- High school: Butler
- College: Michigan State
- NFL draft: 1970: 8th round, 204th overall pick

Career history
- Los Angeles Rams (1970–1981)

Awards and highlights
- Second-team All-Pro (1980); 6× Pro Bowl (1976–1981); First-team All-Big Ten (1969); Second-team All-Big Ten (1968)

Career NFL statistics
- Games played: 176
- Games started: 106
- Fumble recoveries: 6
- Stats at Pro Football Reference

Richard Robert Saul (February 5, 1948 – April 15, 2012) was an American professional football center and long snapper who played from 1970 through 1981 for the Los Angeles Rams of the National Football League (NFL). He played college football for the Michigan State Spartans.

== Professional career ==
After playing the role of reserve lineman from 1970 to 1974, Saul replaced Ken Iman as the starting center with the Rams in 1975. That year, the Rams beat the St. Louis Cardinals in the divisional round of the 1975–76 NFL playoffs, rushing for 237 yards. However, the team lost to the Dallas Cowboys in the NFC championship game. In 1976, the Rams beat the Cowboys in the divisional round of the 1976–77 NFL playoffs, rushing for 120 yards. But they lost the NFC championship game to the Minnesota Vikings, and the following year, lost the divisional round of the 1977–78 NFL playoffs to the same team. They finally beat the Vikings in the 1978–79 NFL playoffs. However, they lost again to the Cowboys in the NFC championship game. In the 1979–80 NFL playoffs the Rams defeated the Cowboys and the Tampa Bay Buccaneers to win the NFC title, rushing for 159 and 216 yards, respectively. But they had a more difficult time running against the Pittsburgh Steelers, only 107 yards, losing Super Bowl XIV. In the 1980–81 NFL playoffs, the Rams lost to the Cowboys again, this time in a wild card game. In Saul's final year, 1981, the Rams deteriorated to a won-lost record of 6–10, his final game being a 30–7 loss to the Washington Redskins.

Saul was selected to six Pro Bowls (1976 to 1981) during his career.

== Personal life ==
He had two brothers that played in the NFL. His older brother Bill Saul and his twin brother Ron Saul, who also played with the Spartans.

== Death ==
Saul died on April 15, 2012, at the age of 64 after having suffered with leukemia for nine years.
