= William H. Davis (Pennsylvania state senator) =

American politician

William H. Davis (1 August 1900 – 5 December 1955) was an American politician.

William H. Davis was born in Wilkes-Barre, Pennsylvania on 1 August 1900 to parents John Davis and Janet Owen. Upon graduating from James M. Coughlin High School, Davis enrolled at La Salle Extension University to study accounting. He later attended the Temple University School of Commerce. He served in the World War I. Davis was secretary and treasurer of the Merchants Warehousing Company, as well as president of the Wilkes-Barre Motor Car Company. He served as deputy Luzerne County controller for a decade before taking office as a member of the Pennsylvania Senate in 1955. Davis held the District 21 seat as a Democrat until 5 December 1955, when he died in office. He was married to Edna Morrissey, a fellow Wilkes-Barre native.
