= Center Township, Butler County, Pennsylvania =

Township in Pennsylvania, US

Coordinates: 40°55′06″N 79°55′21″W

- Township
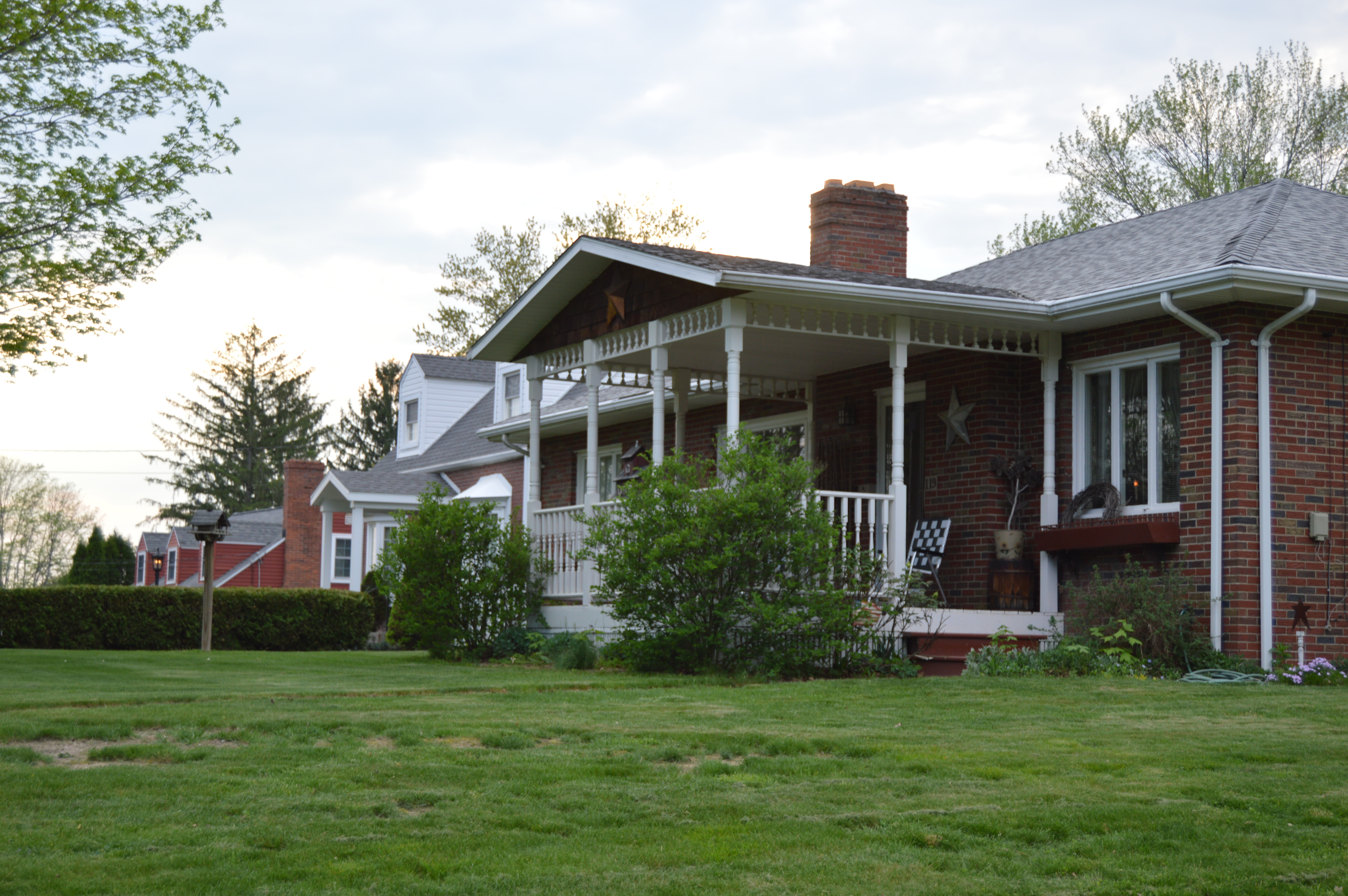
- Houses on Mayfield Drive in Shanor-Northvue

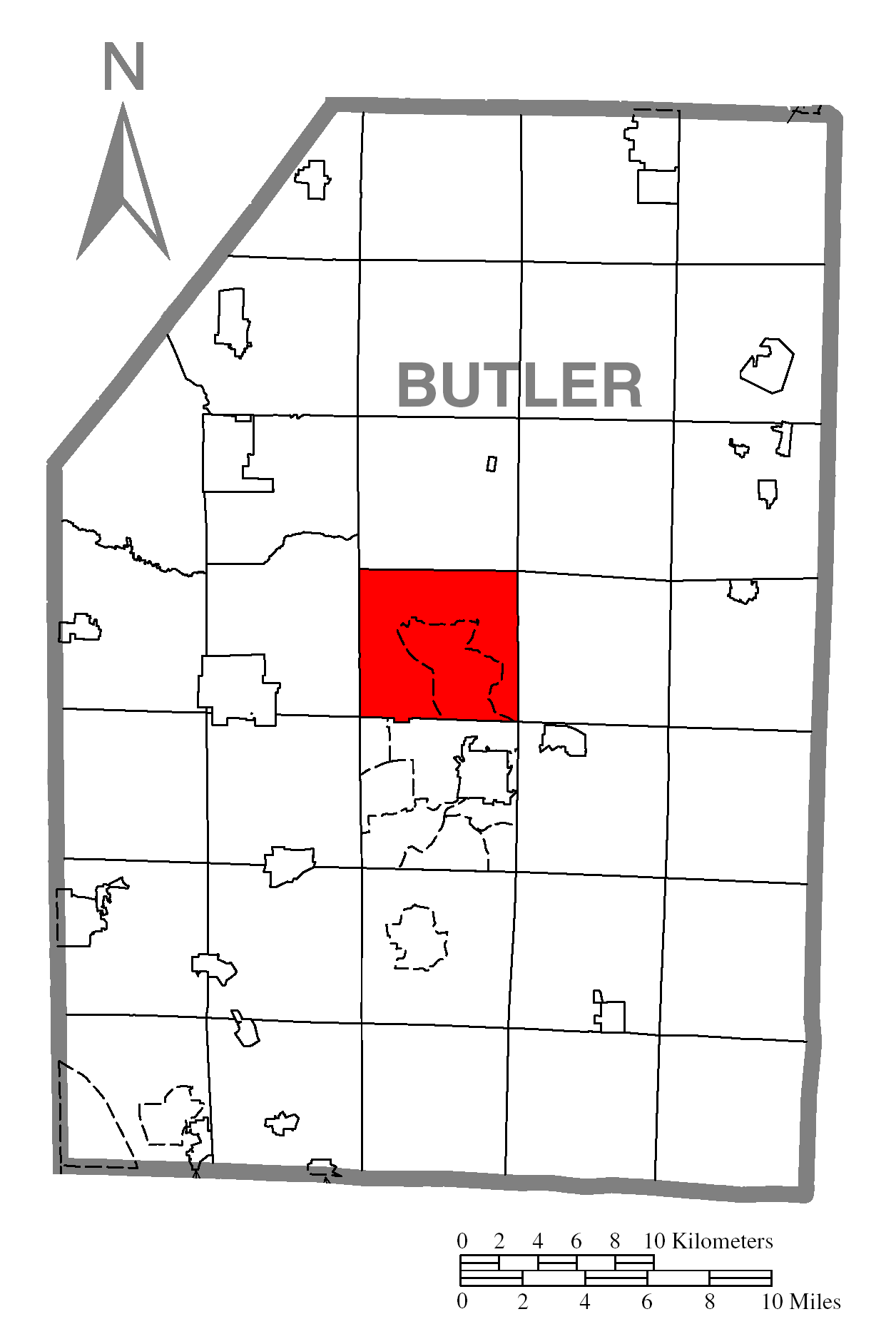
- Map of Butler County, Pennsylvania, highlighting Center Township

- Map of Butler County, Pennsylvania
- Country: United States
- State: Pennsylvania
- County: Butler
- Incorporated: 1804

Area
  - Total: 24.44 sq mi (63.30 km^{2})
  - Land: 24.40 sq mi (63.19 km^{2})
  - Water: 0.042 sq mi (0.11 km^{2})

Population (2020)
  - Total: 7,900 ▲
  - Estimate (2022): 7,811
  - Density: 317.6/sq mi (122.62/km^{2})
- Time zone: UTC-5 (Eastern (EST))
  - Summer (DST): UTC-4 (EDT)
- FIPS code: 42-019-12024
- Website: centertownship.net

Center Township is a township in Butler County, Pennsylvania, United States. The population was 7,900 at the 2020 census.

== History ==
Formed from the upper third of Middlesex Township as Centre Township in 1804, when the four original 1800 townships of the county were partitioned into thirteen townships. Centre remained eight miles square, until the 1854 reorganization into townships approximately five miles square, when a portion of North Butler (renamed Butler) Township moved the southern boundary of Centre about a mile south, while the northern boundary moved over three miles south to its current location when sections were removed to become the southern part of Clay Township. while western sections were transferred to Franklin Township. Centre's eastern sections contributed to portions of Concord Township and Oakland Township. There is no specific date when the spelling of Centre Township was officially changed to Center Township. The transition from "Centre" to "Center" occurred gradually over time due to the evolution of American English. Local histories from the late 19th century (such as the 1883 and 1895 History of Butler County volumes) still extensively utilized the traditional "Centre" spelling. However, over the course of the late 19th and 20th centuries, federal, state, and local entities gradually adopted the standardized American "Center" variant.

== Geography ==
Center Township is located at the geographic center of Butler County, just north of Butler Township and the city of Butler, the county seat. It contains the unincorporated communities of Unionville and Shanor-Northvue, both census-designated places.

Pennsylvania Route 8 is the main road through the township, leading south into Butler and north to Franklin. Connoquenessing Creek flows through the southeastern part of the township.

According to the United States Census Bureau, the township has a total area of 24.4 square miles (63.3 km^{2}), of which 24.4 square miles (63.2 km^{2}) is land and 0.04 square miles (0.1 km^{2}), or 0.17%, is water.

== Demographics ==
Historical population
Census	Pop.	Note	%±
2010	7,898		—
2020	7,900		0.0%
2022 (est.)	7,811		−1.1%
U.S. Decennial Census

As of the 2000 census, there were 8,182 people, 3,333 households, and 2,346 families residing in the township. The population density was 334.7 inhabitants per square mile (129.2/km^{2}). There were 3,482 housing units at an average density of 142.4 per square mile (55.0/km^{2}). The racial makeup of the township was 98.1% White, 0.4% African American, 0.6% Asian, 0.1% from other races, and 0.4% from two or more races. Hispanic or Latino of any race were 0.3% of the population.

There were 3,333 households, out of which 28.6% had children under the age of 18 living with them, 60.7% were married couples living together, 7.2% had a female householder with no husband present, and 29.6% were non-families. 26.3% of all households were made up of individuals, and 13.0% had someone living alone who was 65 years of age or older. The average household size was 2.42 and the average family size was 2.93.

In the township the population was spread out, with 22.0% under the age of 18, 6.6% from 18 to 24, 26.7% from 25 to 44, 26.8% from 45 to 64, and 17.9% who were 65 years of age or older. The median age was 42 years. For every 100 females there were 93.1 males. For every 100 females age 18 and over, there were 88.9 males.

The median income for a household in the township was $42,406, and the median income for a family was $50,731. Males had a median income of $42,443 versus $25,473 for females. The per capita income for the township was $21,790. About 2.9% of families and 5.8% of the population were below the poverty line, including 6.8% of those under age 18 and 6.2% of those age 65 or over.

== Economy ==
Center Township is served by the Clearview Mall, featuring 70+ stores and anchored by Boscov's, Dunham Sports, Rural King, and Altitude Trampoline Park.

== Education ==
The school district is Butler Area School District. The district operates Center Township Elementary School, in the township. Butler Area Intermediate High School and Butler Area Senior High School are the district's comprehensive secondary schools.
