= Summit Township, Butler County, Pennsylvania =

Township in Pennsylvania, US

Coordinates: 40°53′00″N 79°51′59″W

- Township
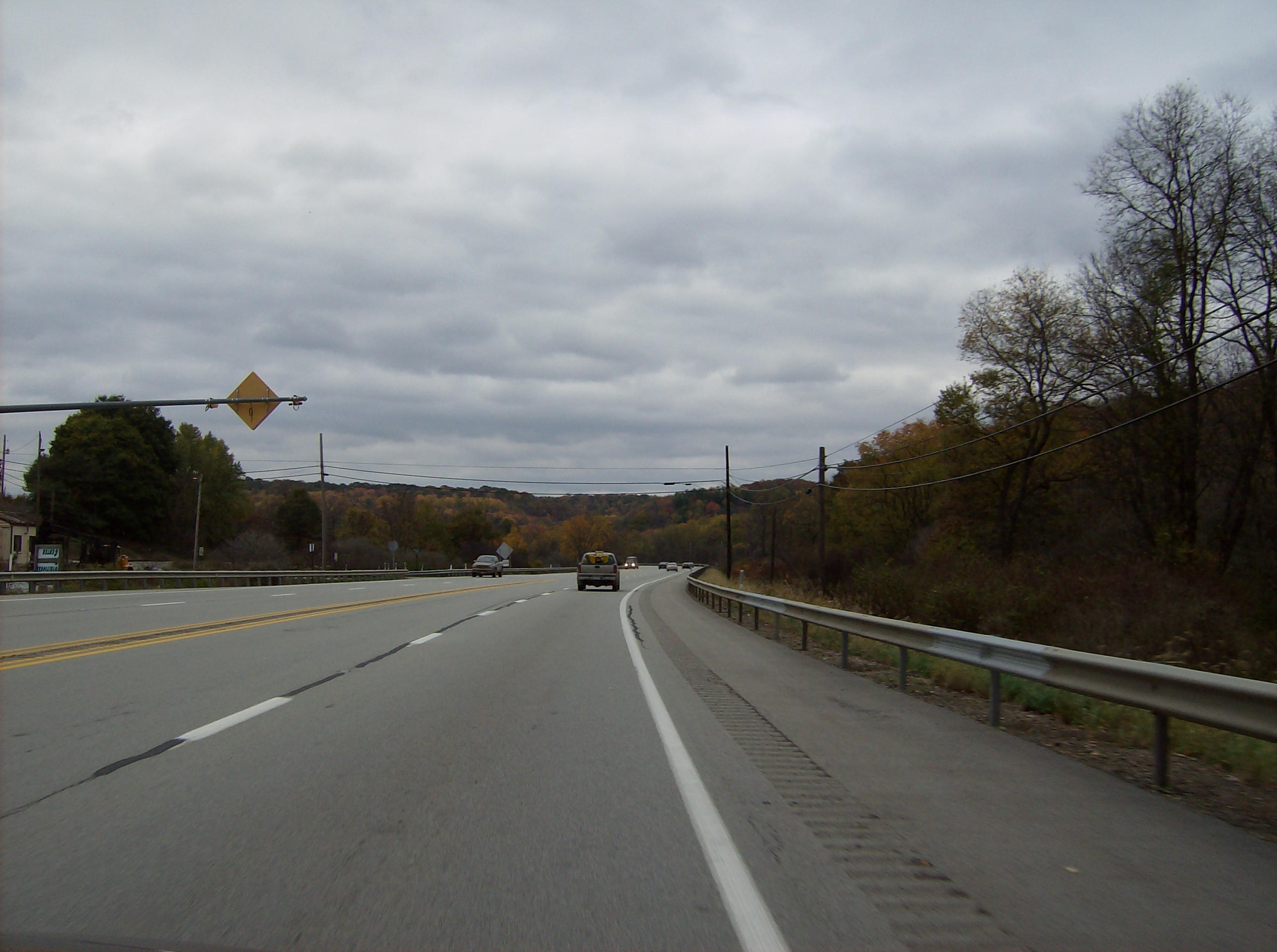
- Along U.S. Route 422 in Summit Township

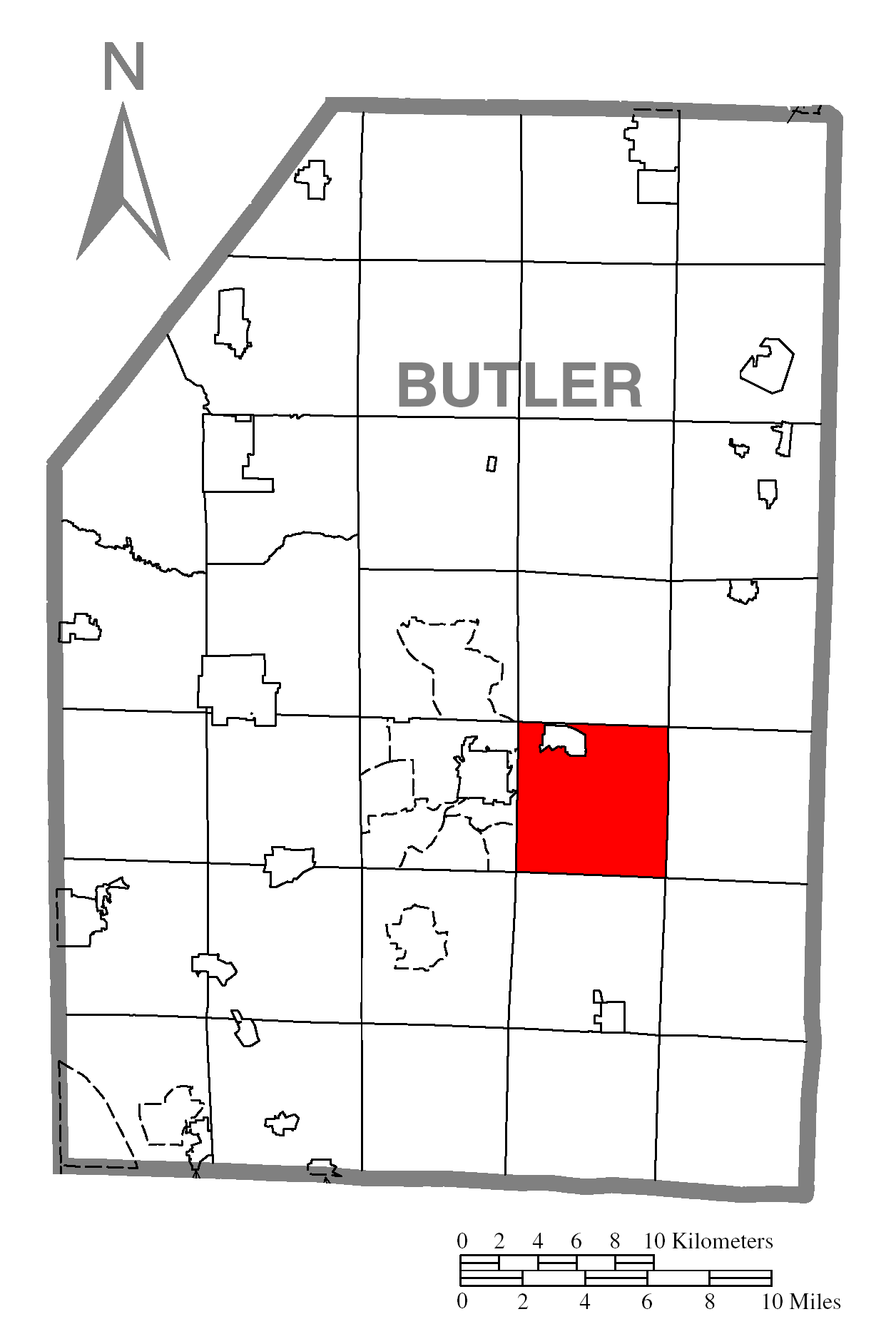
- Map of Butler County, Pennsylvania, highlighting Summit Township

- Map of Butler County, Pennsylvania
- Country: United States
- State: Pennsylvania
- County: Butler
- Settled: 1796
- Incorporated: 1854

Area
  - Total: 22.54 sq mi (58.37 km^{2})
  - Land: 22.49 sq mi (58.26 km^{2})
  - Water: 0.042 sq mi (0.11 km^{2})

Population (2020)
  - Total: 4,503 ▼
  - Estimate (2022): 4,420
  - Density: 209.3/sq mi (80.83/km^{2})
- Time zone: UTC-5 (Eastern (EST))
  - Summer (DST): UTC-4 (EDT)
- FIPS code: 42-019-75184
- Website: summittwp.org

Summit Township is a township that is located in Butler County, Pennsylvania, United States. The population was 4,503 at the time of the 2020 census.

== Geography ==
Summit Township is located in east-central Butler County, just east of the city of Butler, the county seat. The township surrounds the borough of East Butler but is a separate entity.

The unincorporated communities of Herman, Brinker, Vogleyville, Bonnie Brook, Wadsworth, and Carbon Center are located in the township.

U.S. Route 422, the Benjamin Franklin Highway, crosses the township, connecting Butler to the west with Kittanning to the east.

According to the United States Census Bureau, the township has a total area of 22.5 square miles (58.4 km^{2}), of which 22.5 square miles (58.3 km^{2}) is land and 0.04 square miles (0.1 km^{2}), or 0.18%, is water.

== Demographics ==
Historical population
Census	Pop.	Note	%±
2010	4,884		—
2020	4,503		−7.8%
2022 (est.)	4,420		−1.8%
U.S. Decennial Census

As of the 2000 census, there were 4,728 people, 1,682 households, and 1,269 families residing in the township.

The population density was 212.1 inhabitants per square mile (81.9/km^{2}). There were 1,755 housing units at an average density of 78.7 per square mile (30.4/km^{2}).

The racial makeup of the township was 95.43% White, 3.98% African American, 0.02% Native American, 0.21% Asian, 0.02% from other races, and 0.34% from two or more races. Hispanic or Latino of any race were 0.78% of the population.

There were 1,682 households, out of which 32.0% had children under the age of eighteen living with them; 63.4% were married couples living together, 8.0% had a female householder with no husband present, and 24.5% were non-families. 20.7% of all households were made up of individuals, and 8.0% had someone living alone who was sixty-five years of age or older.

The average household size was 2.62 and the average family size was 3.04.

Within the township, the population was spread out, with 28.3% of residents who were under the age of eighteen, 7.5% who were aged eighteen to twenty-four, 28.9% who were aged twenty-five to forty-four, 22.7% who were aged forty-five to sixty-four, and 12.6% who were sixty-five years of age or older. The median age was thirty-six years.

For every one hundred females, there were 115.6 males. For every one hundred females who were aged eighteen or older, there were 100.8 males.

The median income for a household in the township was $39,385, and the median income for a family was $45,696. Males had a median income of $31,502 compared with that of $19,597 for females.

The per capita income for the township was $14,996.

Approximately 10.5% of families and 14.5% of the population were living below the poverty line, including 21.9% of those who were under the age of eighteen and 12.2% of those who were aged sixty-five or older.

== Education ==
It is in the Butler Area School District. The district operates Summit Township Elementary School. Butler Area Intermediate High School and Butler Area Senior High School are the district's comprehensive secondary schools.
