= Donald Oesterling =

American politician (1927–2013)

Donald O. Oesterling

Member of the Pennsylvania Senate from the 21st district
- In office January 5, 1965 – November 30, 1972
- Preceded by: Titian James Coffey
- Succeeded by: Thomas Andrews

Personal details
- Born: June 2, 1927 Butler, Pennsylvania, US
- Died: January 20, 2013 (aged 85) Bedford, Virginia, US

Donald Oswald Oesterling (June 2, 1927 – January 20, 2013) was an American politician from Pennsylvania who served as a Democratic member of the Pennsylvania State Senate for the 21st district from 1965 to 1972.

== Early life ==
Donald O. Oesterling was born in Butler, Pennsylvania to Victor K. and Margorie (Oswald) Oesterling. He attended local schools and during World War II, enlisted in the U.S. Navy Reserve and served in the Atlantic Theater.

He received an undergraduate degree from Capitol University and worked for a while as a radio commentator.

== Career ==
He was elected to the Pennsylvania Senate for the 21st district and served from 1965 to 1972. In 1971, he sponsored the Oesterling amendment which legalized abortion in cases of rape and incest.

He was the state president of PA Elks, the Exalter Ruler of Butler Elks 170, a member of the American Legion, and the Veterans of Foreign Wars.

He died at a retirement community at Bedford, Virginia in 2013.
