= Meadowood, Pennsylvania =

Unincorporated community in Pennsylvania, US

- Census-designated place
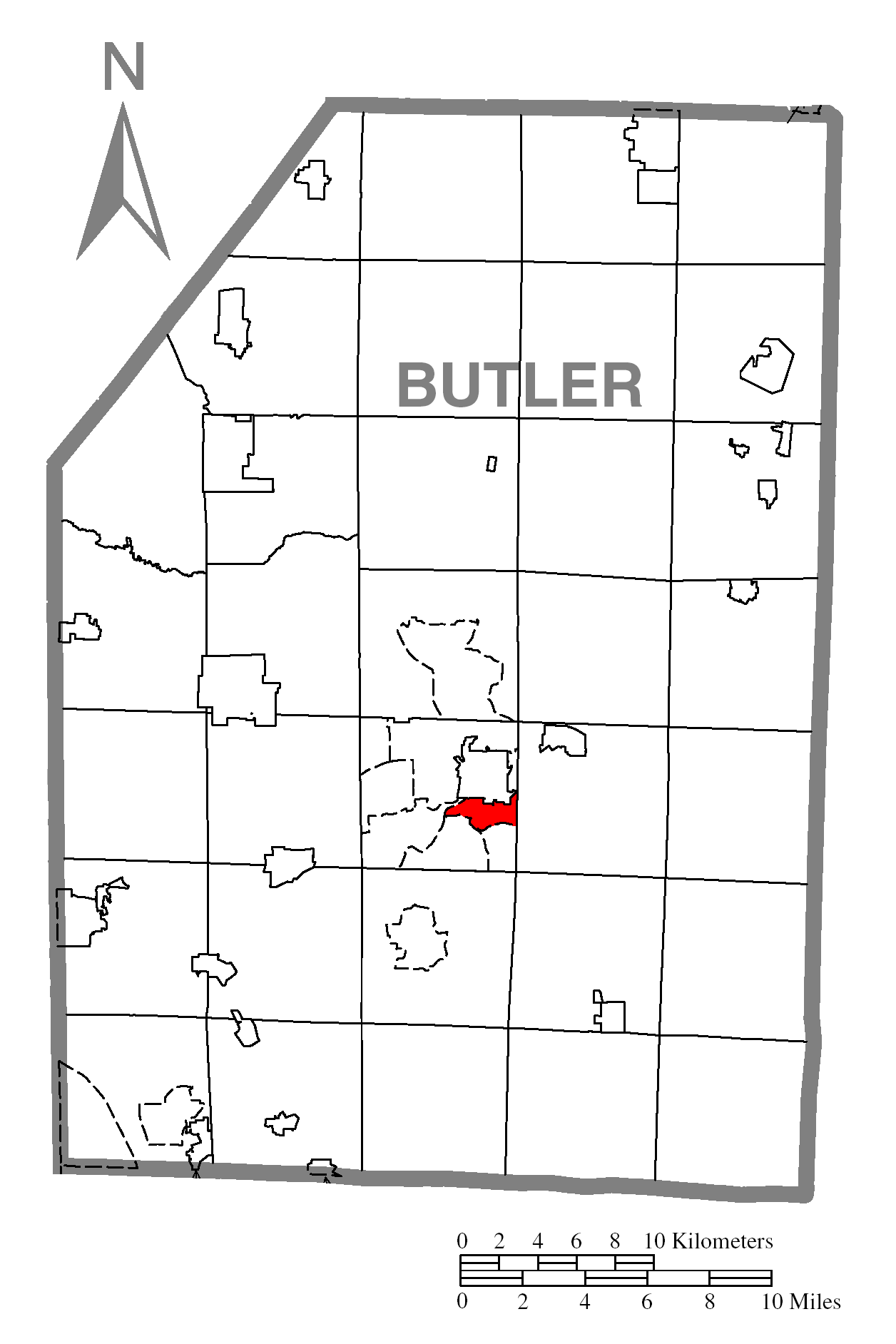
- Location within Butler County

- Location within the U.S. state of Pennsylvania Meadowood (the United States)
- Coordinates: 40°50′49″N 79°53′40″W
- Country: United States
- State: Pennsylvania
- County: Butler
- Township: Butler

Area
  - Total: 1.58 sq mi (4.09 km^{2})
  - Land: 1.57 sq mi (4.06 km^{2})
  - Water: 0.012 sq mi (0.03 km^{2})
- Elevation: 1,300 ft (400 m)

Population (2020)
  - Total: 2,729
  - Density: 1,742.3/sq mi (672.69/km^{2})
- Time zone: UTC-5 (Eastern (EST))
  - Summer (DST): UTC-4 (EDT)
- FIPS code: 42-48336

Meadowood is a census-designated place (CDP) in Butler County, Pennsylvania, United States. The population was 2,693 at the 2010 census.

== Geography ==
Meadowood is located on heights south of the city of Butler at 40°50′49″N 79°53′40″W (40.846949, −79.894440), within Butler Township. It is bordered to the southwest by the CDP of Oak Hills. The northwest edge of the CDP is formed by Connoquenessing Creek, flowing out of Butler on its way to the Beaver River.

Pennsylvania Route 356 passes through the CDP, leading north into downtown Butler and southeast 16 miles (26 km) to Freeport on the Allegheny River.

According to the United States Census Bureau, the CDP has a total area of 1.6 square miles (4.1 km^{2}), of which 0.012 square miles (0.03 km^{2}), or 0.82%, is water.

== Demographics ==
Historical population
Census	Pop.	Note	%±
2020	2,729		—
U.S. Decennial Census

As of the 2000 census, there were 2,912 people, 1,100 households, and 799 families residing in the CDP. The population density was 1,881.2 inhabitants per square mile (726.3/km^{2}). There were 1,130 housing units at an average density of 730.0 per square mile (281.9/km^{2}). The racial makeup of the CDP was 98.73% White, 0.72% African American, 0.03% Native American, 0.21% Asian, and 0.31% from two or more races. Hispanic or Latino of any race were 0.14% of the population.

There were 1,100 households, out of which 28.5% had children under the age of 18 living with them, 63.2% were married couples living together, 6.1% had a female householder with no husband present, and 27.3% were non-families. 24.1% of all households were made up of individuals, and 12.3% had someone living alone who was 65 years of age or older. The average household size was 2.43 and the average family size was 2.89.

In the CDP, the population was spread out, with 20.4% under the age of 18, 4.7% from 18 to 24, 24.0% from 25 to 44, 27.1% from 45 to 64, and 23.8% who were 65 years of age or older. The median age was 46 years. For every 100 females, there were 90.0 males. For every 100 females age 18 and over, there were 86.3 males.

The median income for a household in the CDP was $48,004, and the median income for a family was $53,536. Males had a median income of $42,422 versus $23,387 for females. The per capita income for the CDP was $19,616. About 2.2% of families and 3.1% of the population were below the poverty line, including 3.5% of those under age 18 and 3.9% of those age 65 or over.

== Education ==
The school district is Butler Area School District. Butler Area Intermediate High School and Butler Area Senior High School are the district's comprehensive secondary schools.
