= Butler Township, Butler County, Pennsylvania =

Township in Pennsylvania, US

Coordinates: 40°51′15″N 79°55′39″W

Butler Township
- Township
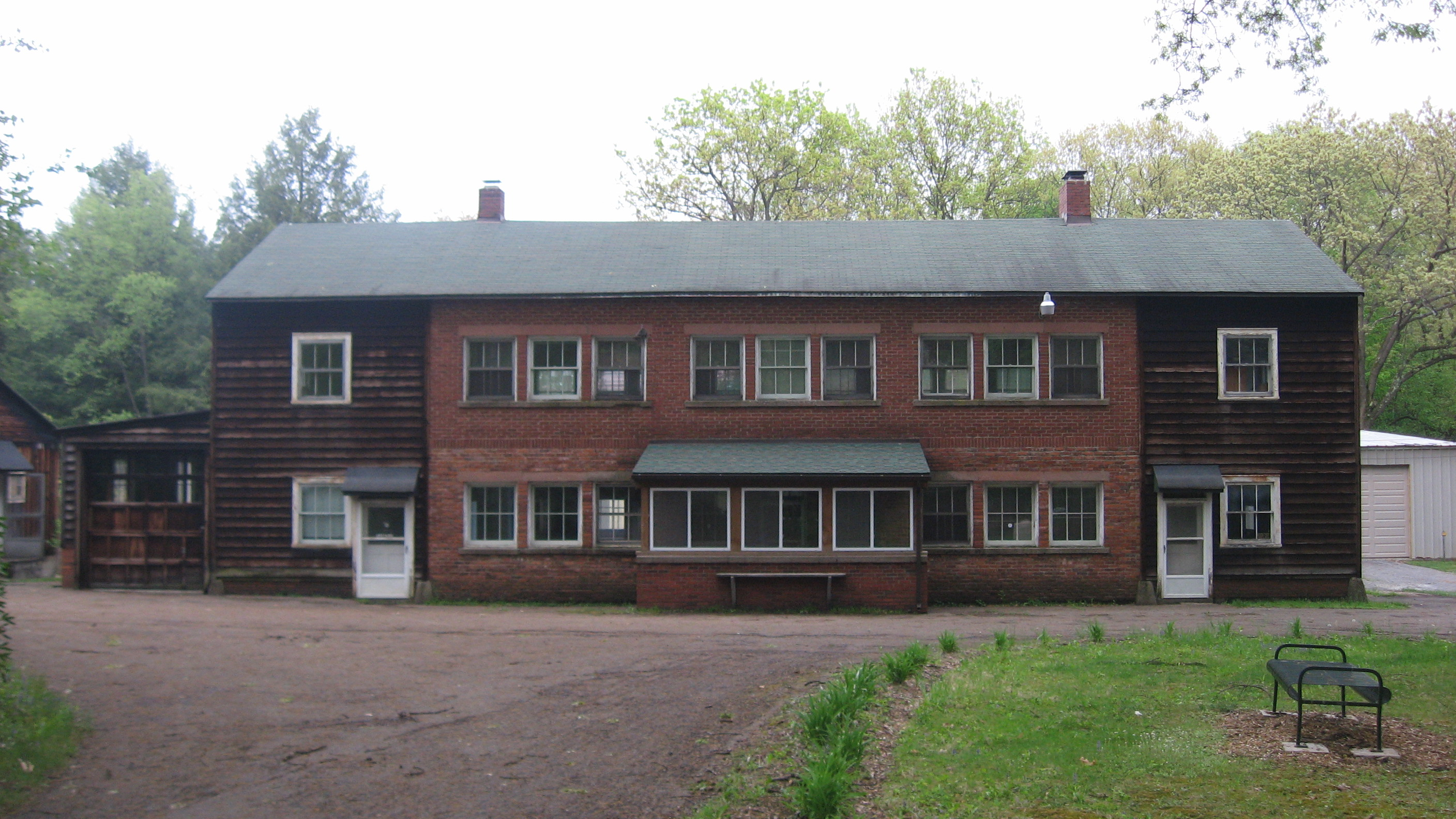
- Building at Preston Park, formerly Preston Laboratories, in Butler Township

- Logo

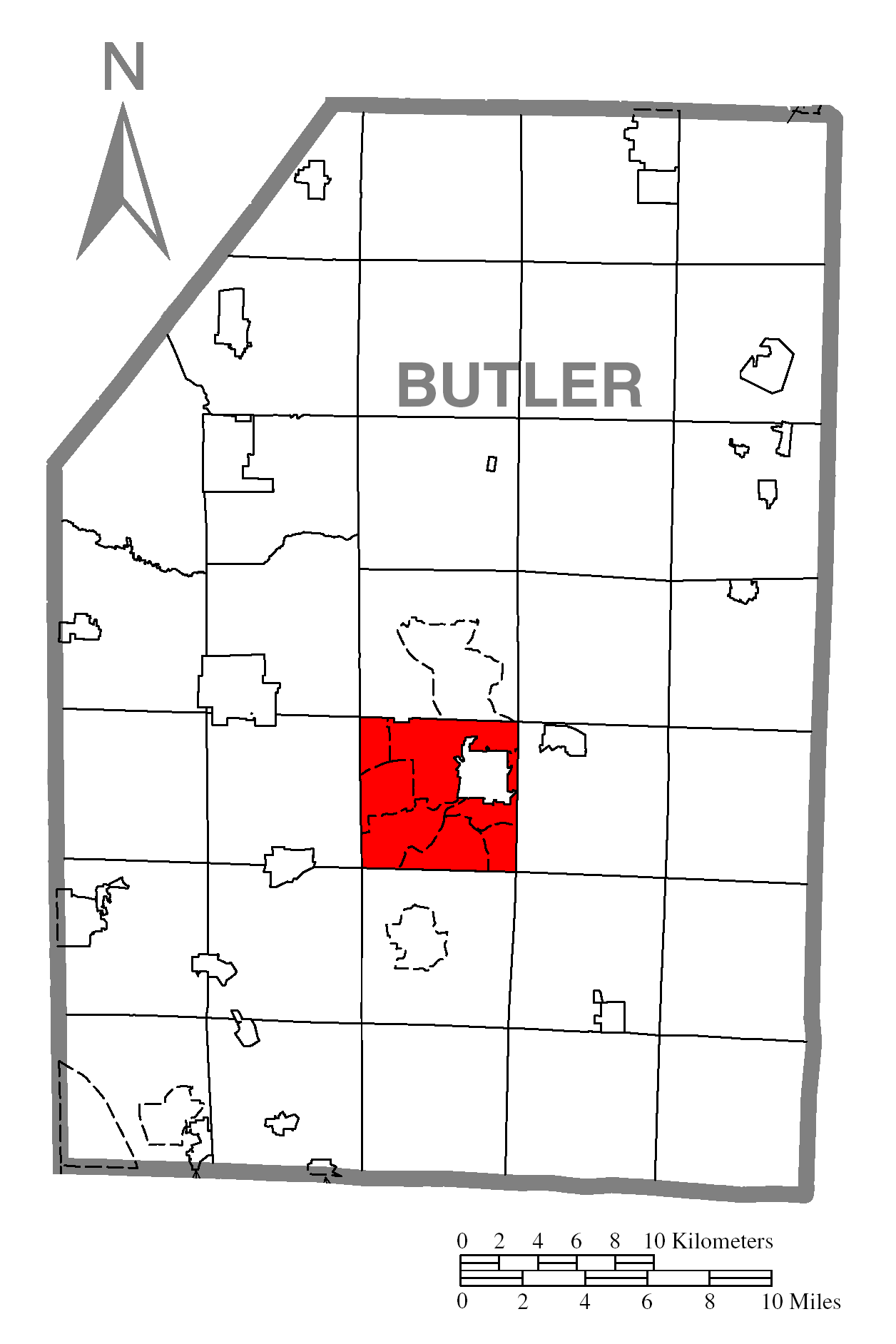
- Map of Butler County, Pennsylvania highlighting Butler Township

- Map of Butler County, Pennsylvania
- Country: United States
- State: Pennsylvania
- County: Butler
- Settled: 1795
- Incorporated: 1804

Government
  - Type: Five-member Board of Commissioners
  - Board President: Edward Natali
  - Township Manager: Tom Knights
  - Mailing Address: 290 South Duffy Road, Butler, PA 16001

Area
  - Total: 21.75 sq mi (56.33 km^{2})
  - Land: 21.62 sq mi (56.00 km^{2})
  - Water: 0.13 sq mi (0.33 km^{2})

Population (2020)
  - Total: 17,230 ▼
  - Estimate (2022): 16,854
  - Density: 775.6/sq mi (299.46/km^{2})
- Time zone: UTC-5 (Eastern (EST))
  - Summer (DST): UTC-4 (EDT)
- Postal codes: 16001, 16002, 16045, 16053
- Area code: 724
- FIPS code: 42-019-10472
- Website: www.butlertwp.org
- Butler Area School District

Butler Township is a township in Butler County, Pennsylvania, United States. The population was 17,230 at the 2020 census. The township was first settled by Europeans in 1795. It was established as a township in 1804 and as a first class township in 1922.

== History ==
In 1795 William Kearns was an early settler of the township. He was originally from Ireland and owned around 1,000 acres of land in both Butler township and Summit township. A revolutionary war soldier by the name of Thomas McKee also owned land in Butler township at the same time. Butler Township was incorporated in 1804 when Butler County was divided into 13 different townships, granted at this time Butler township was split into North and South Butler until 1854 when it gained its current day boundaries.

On July 13, 2024, the attempted assassination of Donald Trump took place in Butler Township, in the Butler Farm Show Grounds. At the event, Butler Township police primarily did traffic duties. The majority of the venue is in adjacent Connoquenessing Township, and that township uses the Pennsylvania State Police as its local law enforcement. Therefore the state police agency filled several law enforcement duties during the event instead of the Butler Township police.

== Geography ==
Butler Township is located near the center of Butler County and surrounds the city of Butler, the county seat. The township contains the unincorporated communities of Homeacre-Lyndora, Meridian, Meadowood, and Oak Hills, all of which are census-designated places. The unincorporated town of Lyndora, which has its own post office (zip code 16045), is located within Butler Township.

According to the United States Census Bureau, the township has a total area of 21.7 square miles (56.3 km^{2}), of which 21.6 square miles (56.0 km^{2}) is land and 0.12 square miles (0.3 km^{2}), or 0.58%, is water.

Connoquenessing Creek, a tributary of the Beaver River, flows to the southwest out of Butler city and crosses the southern part of the township. In 2000, a scientific study was conducted to determine the health of the creek. Researchers discovered that only the Mississippi River received more toxic materials than the Connoquenessing, making the small river the second most polluted waterway in the United States. At the time, the Armco Inc. steel facility in Butler ranked first nationally for the amount of pollutant discharges. However, by 2010, due to reduced industry and clean up efforts, the creek's health has significantly recovered and has become popular for water-sport activities.

== Demographics ==
Historical population
Census	Pop.	Note	%±
1940	9,248		—
1950	12,069		30.5%
1960	15,219		26.1%
1970	17,422		14.5%
1980	18,651		7.1%
1990	17,625		−5.5%
2000	17,185		−2.5%
2010	17,248		0.4%
2020	17,230		−0.1%
2022 (est.)	16,854		−2.2%
U.S. Decennial Census

As of the census of 2010, there were 17,248 people, 7,409 households, and 4,880 families residing in the township. The population density was 799.2 inhabitants per square mile (308.6/km^{2}). There were 7,500 housing units at an average density of 348.8 per square mile (134.7/km^{2}). The racial makeup of the township was 98.1% White, 0.5% African American, 0.5% Asian, 0.1% Pacific Islander, and 0.4% from two or more races. Hispanic or Latino of any race were 0.4% of the population.

There were 7,201 households, out of which 26.0% had children under the age of 18 living with them, 57.0% were married couples living together, 7.8% had a female householder with no husband present, and 32.1% were non-families. 28.8% of all households were made up of individuals, and 14.5% had someone living alone who was 65 years of age or older. The average household size was 2.33 and the average family size was 2.87.

In the township the population was spread out, with 20.7% under the age of 18, 5.9% from 18 to 24, 25.4% from 25 to 44, 26.9% from 45 to 64, and 21.1% who were 65 years of age or older. The median age was 44 years. For every 100 females, there were 93.3 males. For every 100 females age 18 and over, there were 90.3 males.

The median income for a household in the township was $41,274, and the median income for a family was $51,824. Males had a median income of $41,486 versus $24,818 for females. The per capita income for the township was $21,218. About 5.0% of families and 6.9% of the population were below the poverty line, including 6.7% of those under age 18 and 10.4% of those age 65 or over.

== Neighborhoods ==
- Bon Aire
- The Boulevard
- Bredinville
- Castle Heights
- Grandview
- Greenwood Village
- Highfield
- Homeacre
- Lyndora
- Meadowood
- Meridian
- North Butler
- Oak Hills
- Stirling Glen
- Westwood Manor

== Government ==
The Butler Township Police Department is the local law enforcement agency.

The township houses Pennsylvania State Police Troop D, which provides local law enforcement to adjacent Connoquenessing Township.

== Education ==
- Butler Area School District All of the following schools are in the township limits:

- Butler Senior High School
- Butler Intermediate High School
- McQuistion Elementary
- Northwest Elementary

- Butler County Area Vocational-Technical School
- Butler County Community College (BC3)

Previously the school district operated Meridian Elementary School. In 2015, the district decided to close the school.

== Economy ==
The AK Steel Butler Works plant is located entirely in the township on approximately 1,000 acres (400 ha).

The main shopping corridor is on New Castle Road and features an array of strip malls and shops. Below is a list of the shopping areas within the township:

- Alameda Plaza
- Bon Aire Plaza
- Butler Commons, formally the Butler Mall
- Butler Crossing
- Greater Butler Mart
- Greenwood Plaza
- Moraine Pointe Plaza
- Point Plaza

== Health ==
- Butler Memorial Hospital
- The Veterans Affairs Medical Center (VA Butler Healthcare). The new VA Healthcare Center is on 46 acres (19 ha) just over the line in Center Township.

== Parks and recreation ==
- Alameda Park, owned and operated by Butler County is entirely within Butler Township. It was once an early amusement park with a small lake. All but the shell of the carousel remains, which has been converted into a pavilion. The lake is also gone. The park is heavily forested and features several hiking trails. The lower portion of Alameda Park Road has been closed to automotive traffic since 2007, but is still open to walking, biking, and running. The park also features a public swimming pool, several picnic shelters, a carousel shelter, two playgrounds, sand volleyball courts, and a bocce court.
- Butler Township Park, owned and operated by the township, there are walking trails, a playground, a dek hockey rink and a large hall that is available for rental.
- Highfield Park, has several baseball fields, playground and a hall that can be rented.
- Preston Park, was the private estate of scientist Dr. Frank W. Preston, a prominent local figure. Upon the death of his wife Jane in 2008, the property was left to the township. The heavily forested park consists of over 90 acres (36 ha) with various walking trails. The park includes a large pond, the Preston's house and laboratory, an arboretum of several dozen coniferous tree species, a prairie, and the largest examples of several coniferous tree species in Pennsylvania. Listed on the National Register of Historic Places.
- Krendale Golf Course, a 27-hole public golf course
- Aubrey's Golf Course, an 18-hole public golf course

== Transportation ==
Pennsylvania Route 68 (Evans City Road/East Jefferson Street) and PA Route 356 (New Castle Road/Center Avenue/Freeport Road) are major roads in the township. PA Route 8 (Pittsburgh Road and North Main Street Extension) passes through the township in a north–south direction on either side of the city limits of Butler. U.S. Route 422, a limited-access highway, runs through the township near its northern edge as it bypasses the city.

The township is also served by The Bus, operated by the Butler Transit Authority.

== Sports ==
See Sports of Butler, Pennsylvania (City)

== Media ==
See Media of Butler, Pennsylvania (City)

== Notable people ==
See Notable People of Butler, Pennsylvania (City)

== See also ==
- Butler, Pennsylvania (City)
- Butler County, Pennsylvania
- National Register of Historic Places listings in Butler County
