= East Butler, Pennsylvania =

Borough in Pennsylvania, US

- Borough
- Borough of East Butler
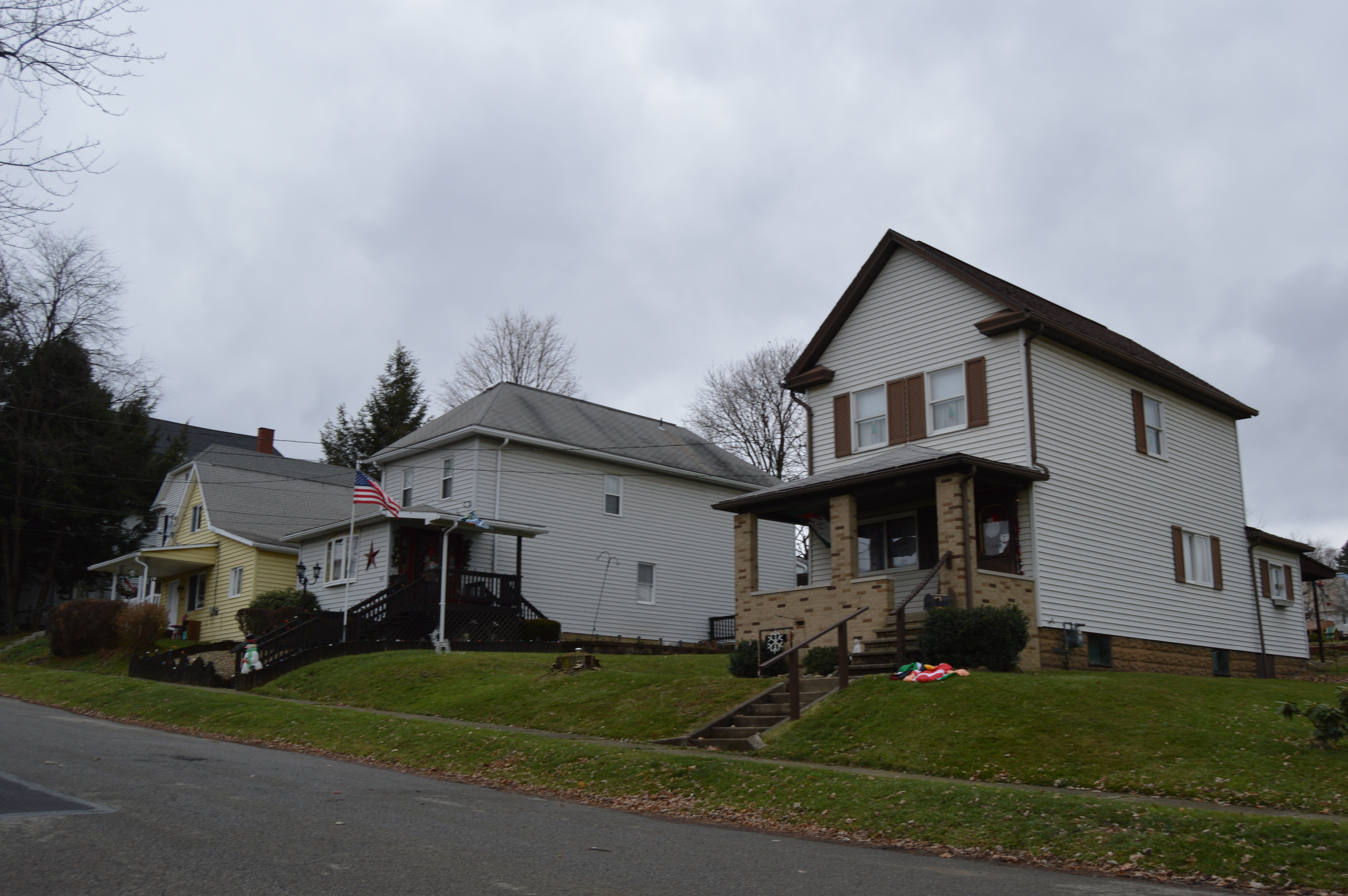
- Houses on Broadway

- Location of East Butler in Butler County, Pennsylvania.

- Location of Pennsylvania in the United States
- Coordinates: 40°52′40″N 79°50′38″W
- Country: United States
- State: Pennsylvania
- County: Butler County
- Settled: 1927

Area
  - Total: 1.04 sq mi (2.70 km^{2})
  - Land: 1.04 sq mi (2.70 km^{2})
  - Water: 0 sq mi (0.00 km^{2})

Population (2020)
  - Total: 764
  - Density: 732.7/sq mi (282.88/km^{2})
- Time zone: UTC-5 (EST)
  - Summer (DST): UTC-4 (EDT)
- ZIP code: 16029
- Area code: 724
- FIPS code: 42-20904
- School district: Butler Area School District
- Website: https://www.eastbutlerborough.org/

East Butler is a borough in Butler County, Pennsylvania, United States. As of the 2020 census, East Butler had a population of 764.

== Geography ==
East Butler is located east of the center of Butler County at 40°52′40″N 79°50′38″W (40.877703, −79.843921), in the valley of Bonnie Brook, a tributary of Connoquenessing Creek. It is 3 miles (5 km) east of downtown Butler, the county seat.

According to the United States Census Bureau, the borough of East Butler has a total area of 1.0 square mile (2.7 km^{2}), all land.

== Demographics ==
Historical population
Census	Pop.	Note	%±
1930	521		—
1940	559		7.3%
1950	758		35.6%
1960	1,007		32.8%
1970	919		−8.7%
1980	799		−13.1%
1990	725		−9.3%
2000	679		−6.3%
2010	732		7.8%
2020	764		4.4%

As of the 2000 census, there were 679 people, 295 households, and 184 families residing in the borough. The population density was 650.4 inhabitants per square mile (251.1/km^{2}). There were 302 housing units at an average density of 289.3 per square mile (111.7/km^{2}). The racial makeup of the borough was 99.71% White, 0.15% Asian, and 0.15% Pacific Islander. Hispanic or Latino of any race were 0.15% of the population.

There were 295 households, out of which 26.8% had children under the age of 18 living with them, 53.2% were married couples living together, 6.8% had a female householder with no husband present, and 37.6% were non-families. 33.2% of all households were made up of individuals, and 14.2% had someone living alone who was 65 years of age or older. The average household size was 2.30 and the average family size was 2.97.

In the borough the population was spread out, with 20.9% under the age of 18, 8.0% from 18 to 24, 29.2% from 25 to 44, 24.9% from 45 to 64, and 17.1% who were 65 years of age or older. The median age was 40 years. For every 100 females there were 98.0 males. For every 100 females age 18 and over, there were 92.5 males.

The median income for a household in the borough was $34,821, and the median income for a family was $41,375. Males had a median income of $32,917 versus $24,375 for females. The per capita income for the borough was $20,242. About 6.2% of families and 8.4% of the population were below the poverty line, including 10.6% of those under age 18 and 1.6% of those age 65 or over.

== Education ==
It is in the Butler Area School District. Butler Area Intermediate High School and Butler Area Senior High School are the district's comprehensive secondary schools.
