= Clearfield Township, Butler County, Pennsylvania =

Township in Pennsylvania, US

Coordinates: 40°50′00″N 79°45′59″W

- Township
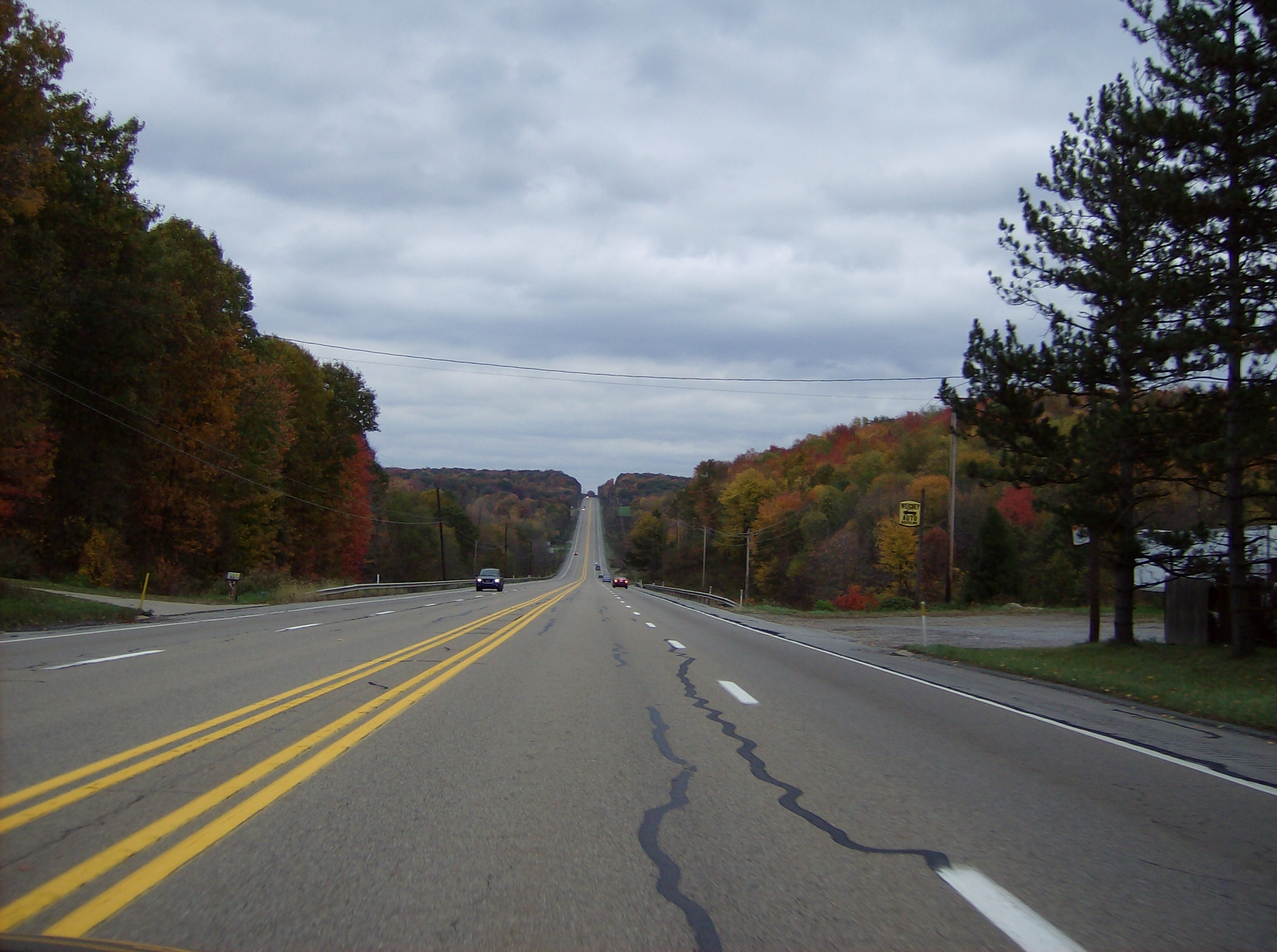
- U.S. Route 422 in the wooded hills of Clearfield Township

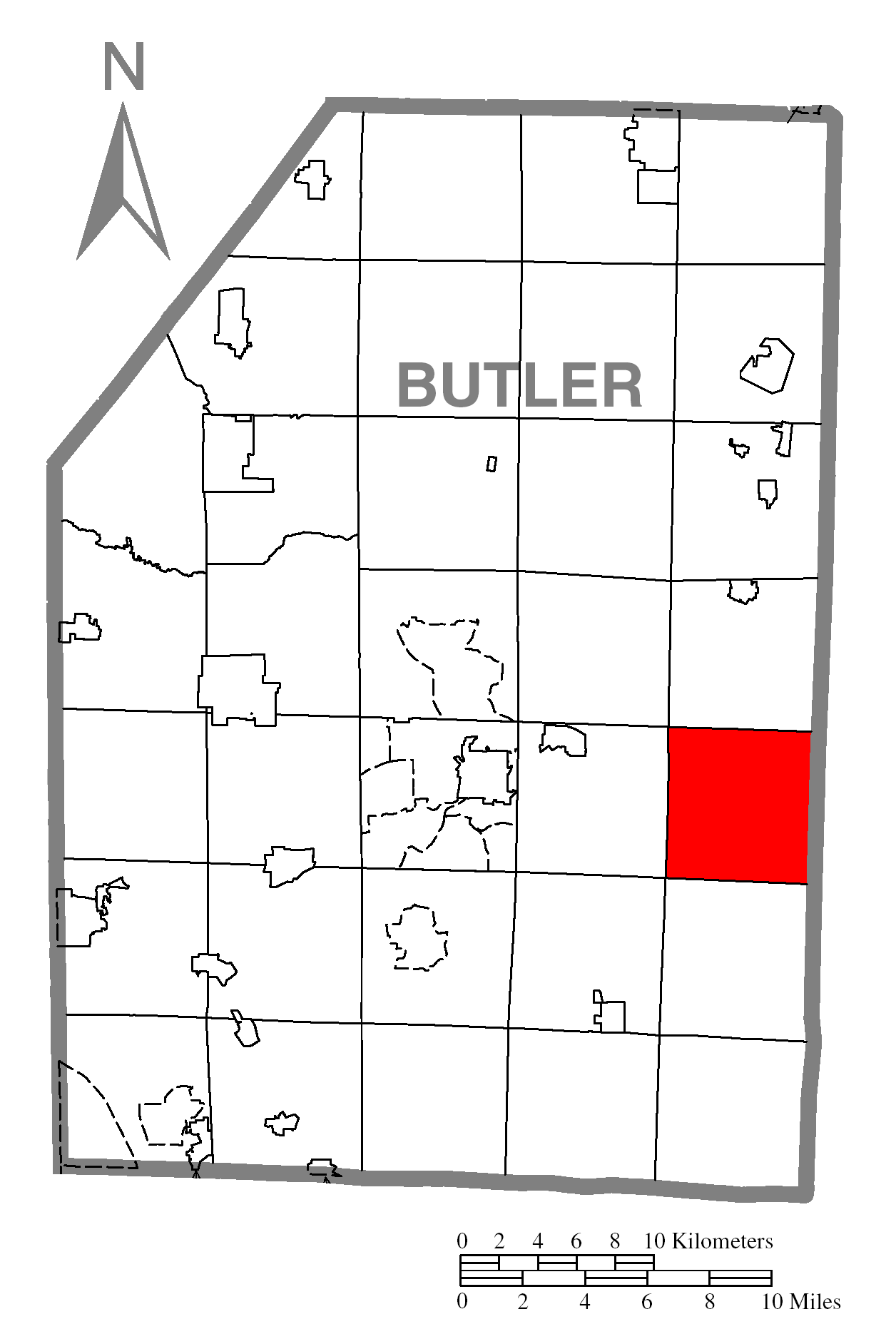
- Map of Butler County, Pennsylvania, highlighting Clearfield Township

- Map of Butler County, Pennsylvania
- Country: United States
- State: Pennsylvania
- County: Butler
- Settled: 1798
- Incorporated: 1804

Area
  - Total: 23.64 sq mi (61.23 km^{2})
  - Land: 23.64 sq mi (61.23 km^{2})
  - Water: 0.0039 sq mi (0.01 km^{2})

Population (2020)
  - Total: 2,430 ▼
  - Estimate (2022): 2,379
  - Density: 109.0/sq mi (42.09/km^{2})
- Time zone: UTC-5 (Eastern (EST))
  - Summer (DST): UTC-4 (EDT)
- FIPS code: 42-019-14048
- Website: clearfieldtwpbutlerpa.com

Clearfield Township is a township in Butler County, Pennsylvania, United States. The population was 2,430 at the 2020 census.

== Geography ==
Clearfield Township is located in eastern Butler County, along the Armstrong County border. It contains the unincorporated communities of Coyleville and Fenelton. U.S. Route 422 passes through the township, leading east to Kittanning and west to Butler.

According to the United States Census Bureau, the township has a total area of 23.6 square miles (61.2 km^{2}), all land.

== Demographics ==
Historical population
Census	Pop.	Note	%±
2010	2,645		—
2020	2,430		−8.1%
2022 (est.)	2,379		−2.1%
U.S. Decennial Census

As of the 2000 census, there were 2,705 people, 917 households, and 697 families residing in the township. The population density was 115.8 inhabitants per square mile (44.7/km^{2}). There were 958 housing units at an average density of 41.0 per square mile (15.8/km^{2}). The racial makeup of the township was 98.82% White, 0.22% African American, 0.18% Native American, 0.07% Asian, 0.18% from other races, and 0.52% from two or more races. Hispanic or Latino of any race were 0.52% of the population.

There were 917 households, out of which 37.0% had children under the age of 18 living with them, 62.7% were married couples living together, 8.6% had a female householder with no husband present, and 23.9% were non-families. 19.8% of all households were made up of individuals, and 5.9% had someone living alone who was 65 years of age or older. The average household size was 2.77 and the average family size was 3.15.

In the township the population was spread out, with 25.2% under the age of 18, 7.7% from 18 to 24, 31.1% from 25 to 44, 23.4% from 45 to 64, and 12.5% who were 65 years of age or older. The median age was 38 years. For every 100 females, there were 98.9 males. For every 100 females age 18 and over, there were 99.4 males.

The median income for a household in the township was $35,208, and the median income for a family was $42,375. Males had a median income of $30,682 versus $20,714 for females. The per capita income for the township was $14,952. About 5.9% of families and 10.8% of the population were below the poverty line, including 9.5% of those under age 18 and 11.9% of those age 65 or over.

== Education ==
It is in the Butler Area School District. Butler Area Intermediate High School and Butler Area Senior High School are the district's comprehensive secondary schools.

The district formerly operated Clearfield Township Elementary School, which closed in 2015.
