= Oakland Township, Butler County, Pennsylvania =

Township in Pennsylvania, US

Coordinates: 40°54′55″N 79°49′42″W

- Township
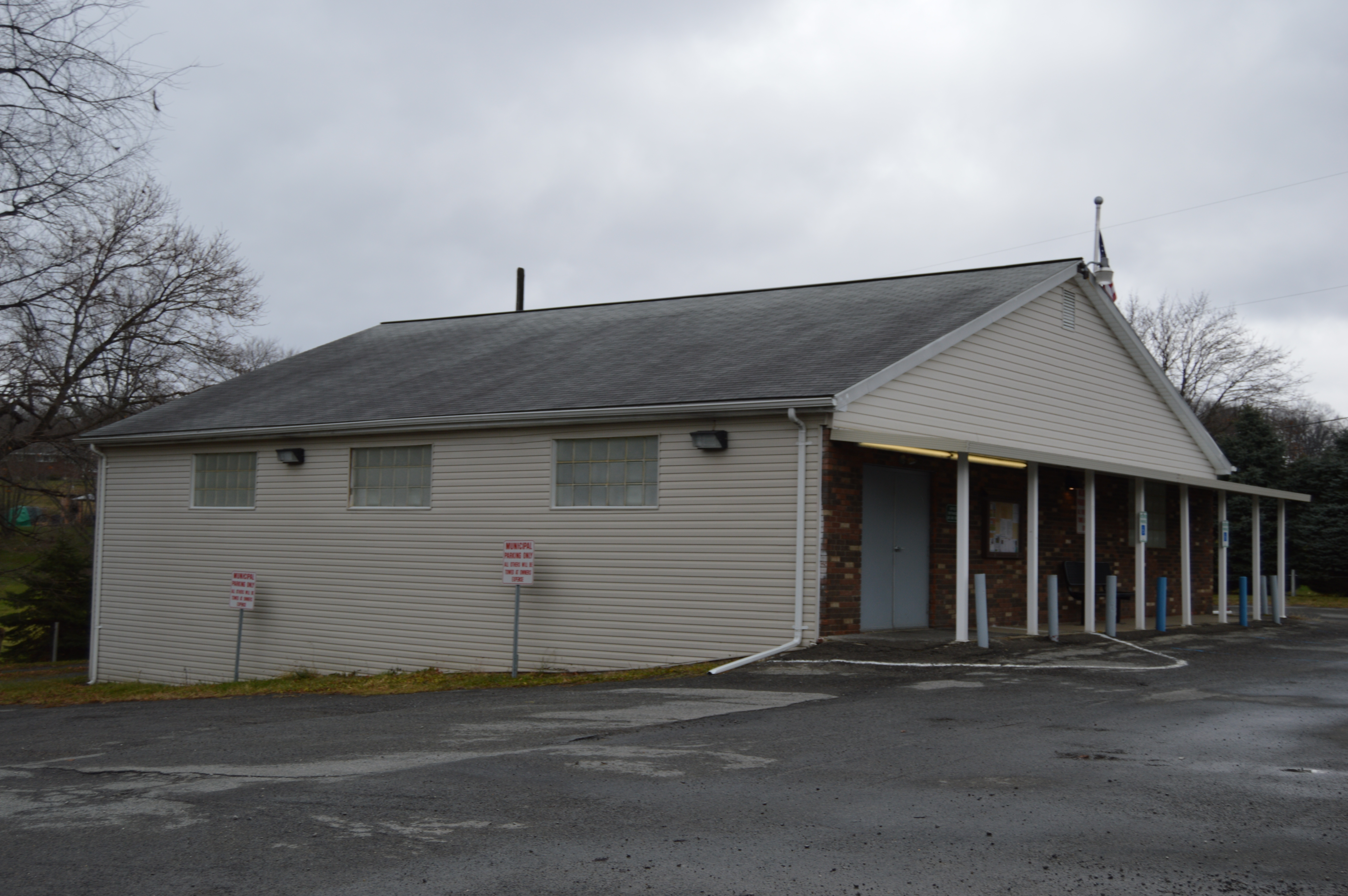
- Township hall at Woodbine

- Logo

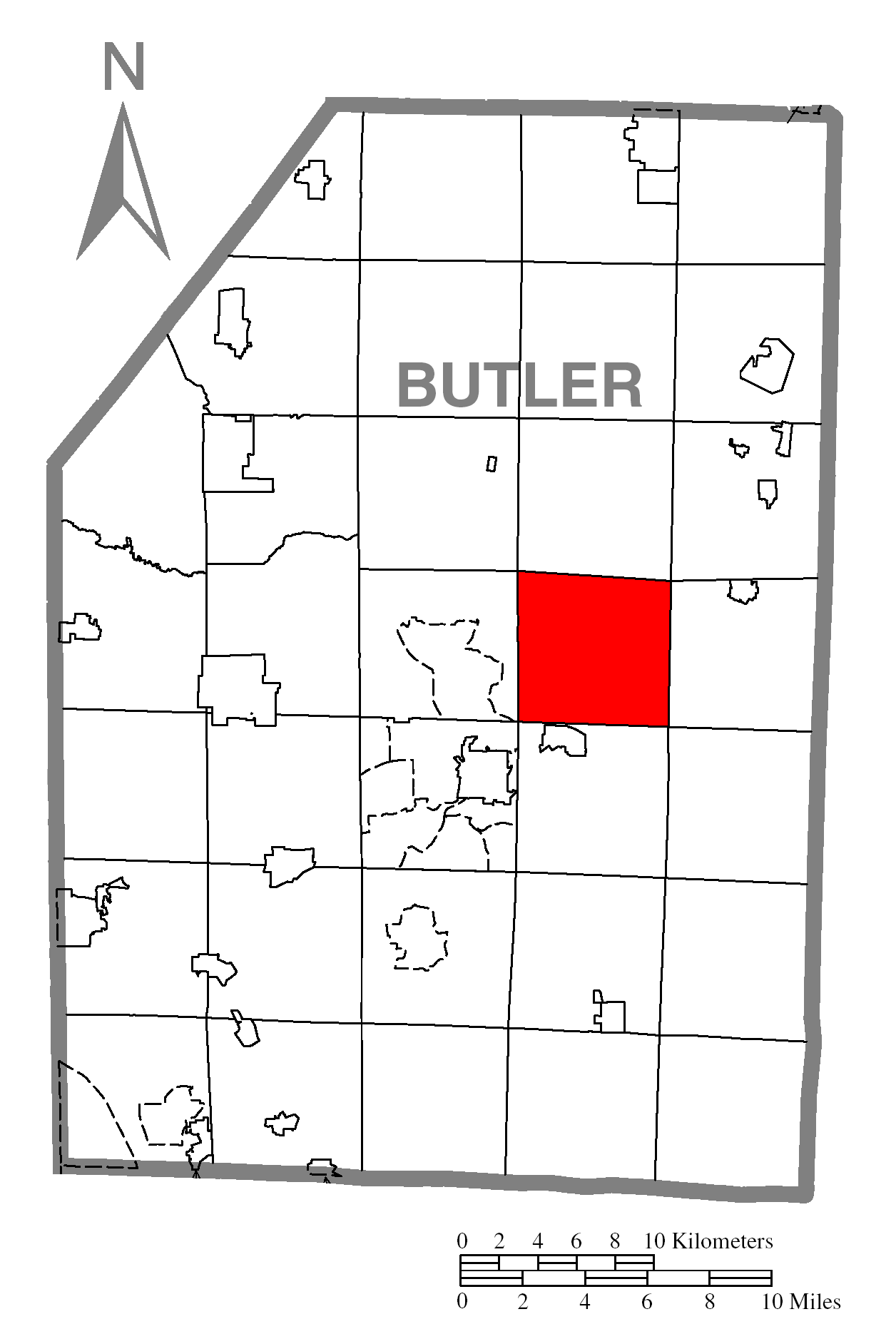
- Map of Butler County, Pennsylvania, highlighting Oakland Township

- Map of Butler County, Pennsylvania
- Country: United States
- State: Pennsylvania
- County: Butler
- Settled: 1798
- Incorporated: 1854

Area
  - Total: 24.01 sq mi (62.19 km^{2})
  - Land: 23.68 sq mi (61.34 km^{2})
  - Water: 0.33 sq mi (0.85 km^{2})

Population (2020)
  - Total: 2,772 ▼
  - Estimate (2022): 2,731
  - Density: 122.4/sq mi (47.26/km^{2})
- Time zone: UTC-5 (Eastern (EST))
  - Summer (DST): UTC-4 (EDT)
- FIPS code: 42-019-55992
- Website: oaklandtownship.us

Oakland Township is a township that is located in Butler County, Pennsylvania, United States. The population was 2,772 at the time of the 2020 census.

== Geography ==
Oakland Township was formed in 1854 in east-central Butler County from portions of other townships.

Oakland Township contains the unincorporated communities of Woodbine, North Oakland, and Boydstown. Connoquenessing Creek flows through the northwestern part of the township, impounded as Lake Oneida for a portion of its course.

According to the United States Census Bureau, the township has a total area of 24.0 square miles (62.2 km^{2}), of which 23.7 square miles (61.3 km^{2}) is land and 0.31 square miles (0.8 km^{2}), or 1.37%, is water.

== Demographics ==
Historical population
| Census | Pop. | Note | %± |
|---|---|---|---|
| 2010 | 2,987 | | — |
| 2020 | 2,772 | | −7.2% |
| 2022 (est.) | 2,731 | | −1.5% |
U.S. Decennial Census

As of the 2000 census, there were 3,074 people, 1,112 households, and 876 families living in the township.

The population density was 134.1 inhabitants per square mile (51.8/km^{2}). There were 1,168 housing units at an average density of 50.9 per square mile (19.7/km^{2}).

The racial makeup of the township was 99.54% White, 0.10% African American, 0.16% Native American, 0.10% Asian, and 0.10% from two or more races. Hispanic or Latino of any race were 0.07% of the population.

There were 1,112 households, out of which 35.2% had children under the age of eighteen living with them; 67.6% were married couples living together, 7.3% had a female householder with no husband present, and 21.2% were non-families. 18.4% of all households were made up of individuals, and 7.8% had someone living alone who was sixty-five years of age or older.

The average household size was 2.76 and the average family size was 3.15.

Within the township, the population was spread out, with 25.9% of residents who were under the age of eighteen, 7.4% who were aged eighteen to twenty-four, 30.1% who were aged twenty-five to forty-four, 24.6% who were aged forty-five to sixty-four, and 12.0% who were sixty-five years of age or older. The median age was thirty-eight years.

For every one hundred females there were 103.2 males. For every one hundred females who were aged eighteen or older, there were 97.4 males.

The median income for a household in the township was $41,025, and the median income for a family was $49,395. Males had a median income of $32,285 compared with that of $22,854 for females.

The per capita income for the township was $17,313.

Approximately 6.9% of families and 6.0% of the population were living below the poverty line, including 3.6% of those who were under the age of eighteen and 19.2% of those who were aged sixty-five or older.

== Education ==
It is in the Butler Area School District. Butler Area Intermediate High School and Butler Area Senior High School are the district's comprehensive secondary schools.

The district formerly operated Oakland Township Elementary School, which closed in 2015.
