= National Register of Historic Places listings in Butler County, Pennsylvania =

Location of Butler County in Pennsylvania

This is a list of the National Register of Historic Places listings in Butler County, Pennsylvania.

This is intended to be a complete list of the properties and districts on the National Register of Historic Places in Butler County, Pennsylvania, United States. The locations of National Register properties and districts for which the latitude and longitude coordinates are included below, may be seen in a map.

There are 13 properties and districts listed on the National Register in the county. One site is further designated as a National Historic Landmark District.

This National Park Service list is complete through NPS recent listings posted January 23, 2026.

== Current listings ==
	Name on the Register	Image	Date listed	Location	City or town	Description
1	Butler Armory	Butler Armory	July 12, 1991 (#91000903)	216 North Washington Street; 40°51′47″N 79°53′50″W	Butler	
2	Butler County Courthouse	Butler County Courthouse	September 15, 1977 (#77001132)	South Main and Diamond Streets; 40°51′30″N 79°53′46″W	Butler	
3	Butler County National Bank	Butler County National Bank	November 7, 1995 (#95001251)	302 South Main Street; 40°51′29″N 79°53′43″W	Butler	
4	Butler Historic District	Butler Historic District	May 29, 2003 (#03000490)	Roughly bounded by North Church Street, Walnut Street, Franklin Street, and Wayne Street; 40°51′39″N 79°53′40″W	Butler	
5	Butler Veterans Administration Hospital Historic District		May 27, 2022 (#100007743)	325 New Castle Rd. 40°52′29″N 79°56′39″W	Butler Township	
6	Elm Court	Elm Court	December 6, 1979 (#79002176)	Between Polk and Elm Streets; 40°52′07″N 79°53′31″W	Butler	
7	Harmony Historic District	Harmony Historic District	March 21, 1973 (#73002139)	Pennsylvania Route 68; 40°48′11″N 80°07′42″W	Harmony	
8	Harmony Mennonite Meetinghouse and Cemetery	Harmony Mennonite Meetinghouse and Cemetery	October 4, 2016 (#16000697)	114 Wise Rd. 40°48′33″N 80°07′41″W	Jackson Township	
9	Sen. Walter Lowrie House	Sen. Walter Lowrie House	May 1, 1979 (#79002177)	West Diamond and South Jackson Streets; 40°51′30″N 79°53′47″W	Butler	
10	Passavant House	Passavant House	April 11, 1977 (#77001133)	243 South Main Street; 40°47′35″N 80°08′13″W	Zelienople	
11	Preston Laboratories	Preston Laboratories	December 26, 2012 (#12001095)	415 S. Eberhart Road, west of Butler; 40°51′12″N 79°57′00″W	Butler Township	Site plan
12	John Roebling House	John Roebling House	November 13, 1976 (#76001610)	Roebling Park, along Rebecca Street; 40°45′03″N 79°48′39″W	Saxonburg	Home of John Roebling
13	Saxonburg Historic District	Saxonburg Historic District	February 14, 2003 (#03000035)	Portions of East and West Main, North and South Rebecca, North and South Isabella, Pittsburgh, Butler, and State Streets; 40°45′00″N 79°49′08″W	Saxonburg	

== See also ==
- List of Pennsylvania state historical markers in Butler County
