= Butler Historic District =

Historic district in Pennsylvania, United States

- U.S. National Register of Historic Places
- U.S. Historic district
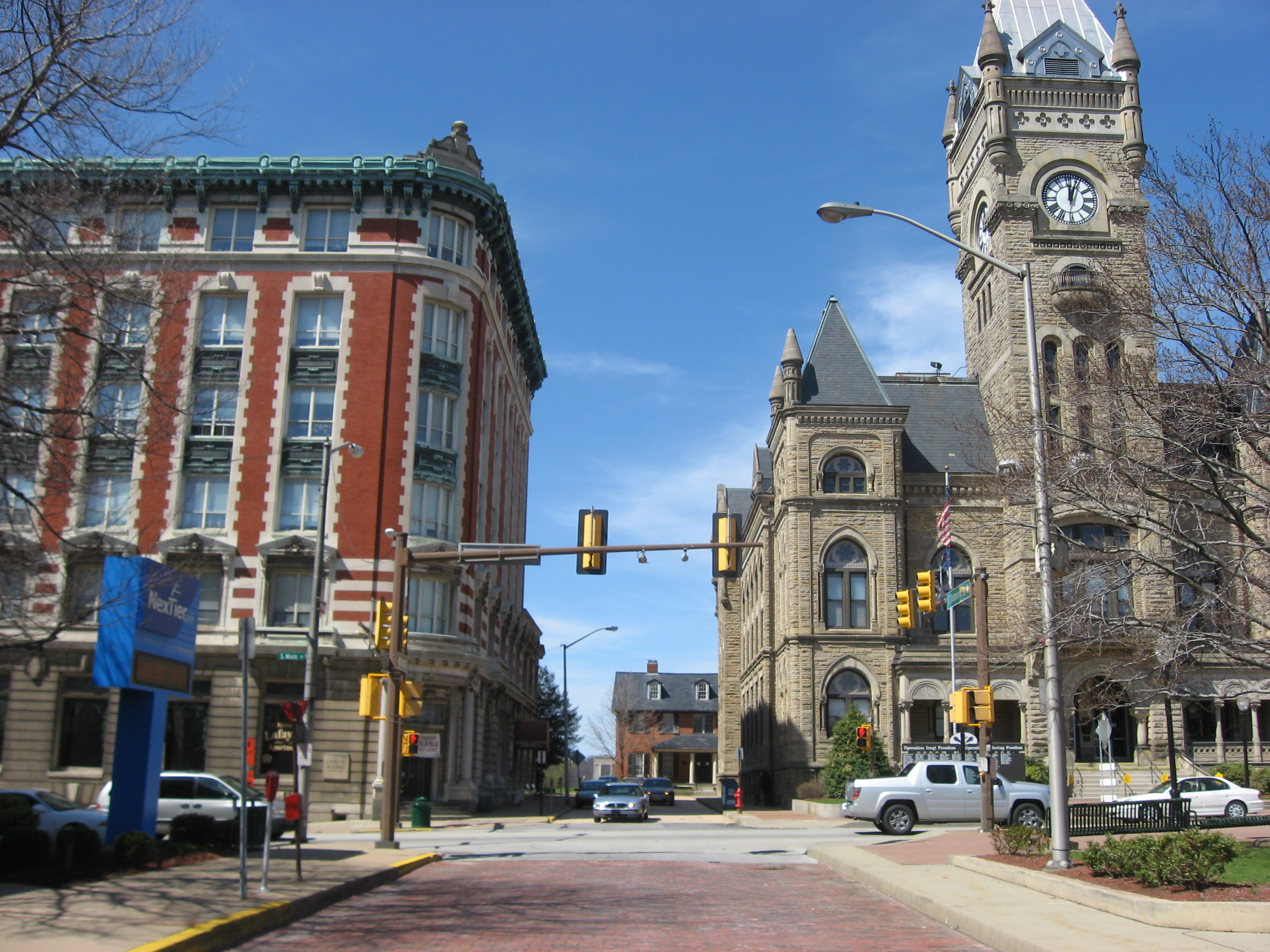
- Butler Historic District, April 2009

- Location within Pennsylvania Location within the United States
- Location: Roughly bounded by N. Church St., Walnut St., Franklin St. and Wayne St., Butler, Pennsylvania
- Coordinates: 40°51′34″N 79°53′40″W
- Area: 46 acres (19 ha)
- Built: 1828
- Architect: Cram and Ferguson; et al.
- Architectural style: Mid 19th Century Revival, Late Victorian
- MPS: Oil Industry Resources in Western Pennsylvania MPS
- NRHP reference No.: 03000490
- Added to NRHP: May 29, 2003

The Butler Historic District is a national historic district which is located in Butler, Butler County, Pennsylvania.

It was listed on the National Register of Historic Places in 1976.

== History and architectural features ==
This district includes one hundred and twenty-eight contributing buildings, one contributing site and four contributing objects which are located in the central business district of Butler. It includes primarily commercial and institutional buildings, with some residential buildings, that were designed in a number of popular architectural styles, including Late Victorian, and built between about 1828 and 1952.

Notable buildings include the City Hall, the former U.S. Post Office which was built in 1912, the Koch Building, which was erected circa 1910, the T.W. Phillips Co. Office Building, the Masonic Temple, which was built in 1910, Butler High School, which was erected in 1917, the Butler YMCA, St. Peter's Anglican Church, which was completed in 1896, the First Evangelical Lutheran Church, which was built in 1897, St. Andrews United Presbyterian Church, which was erected circa 1900, the John Quincy Adams Kennedy House, which was built circa 1884, St. Mark's Evangelical Lutheran Church and School, which were built, respectively, in 1952 and 1925, First Baptist Church, which was erected in 1914, St. Paul's Roman Catholic Church, which was built in 1909, and Butler Savings and Trust, which was erected in 1925.

The contributing site is the Diamond, which contains contributing objects, including the Soldiers and Sailors Monument, which was erected in 1894. Located in the district and listed separately are the Butler County National Bank, the Sen. Walter Lowrie House, and the Butler County Courthouse.
