= Adult Care =

Adult Care could refer to:

- Residential care for adults
- Adult daycare center
- Elderly care
- The Child and Adult Care Food Program in the United States

== See also ==
- Wartburg Adult Care Community
