= Old Main (Geneva College) =

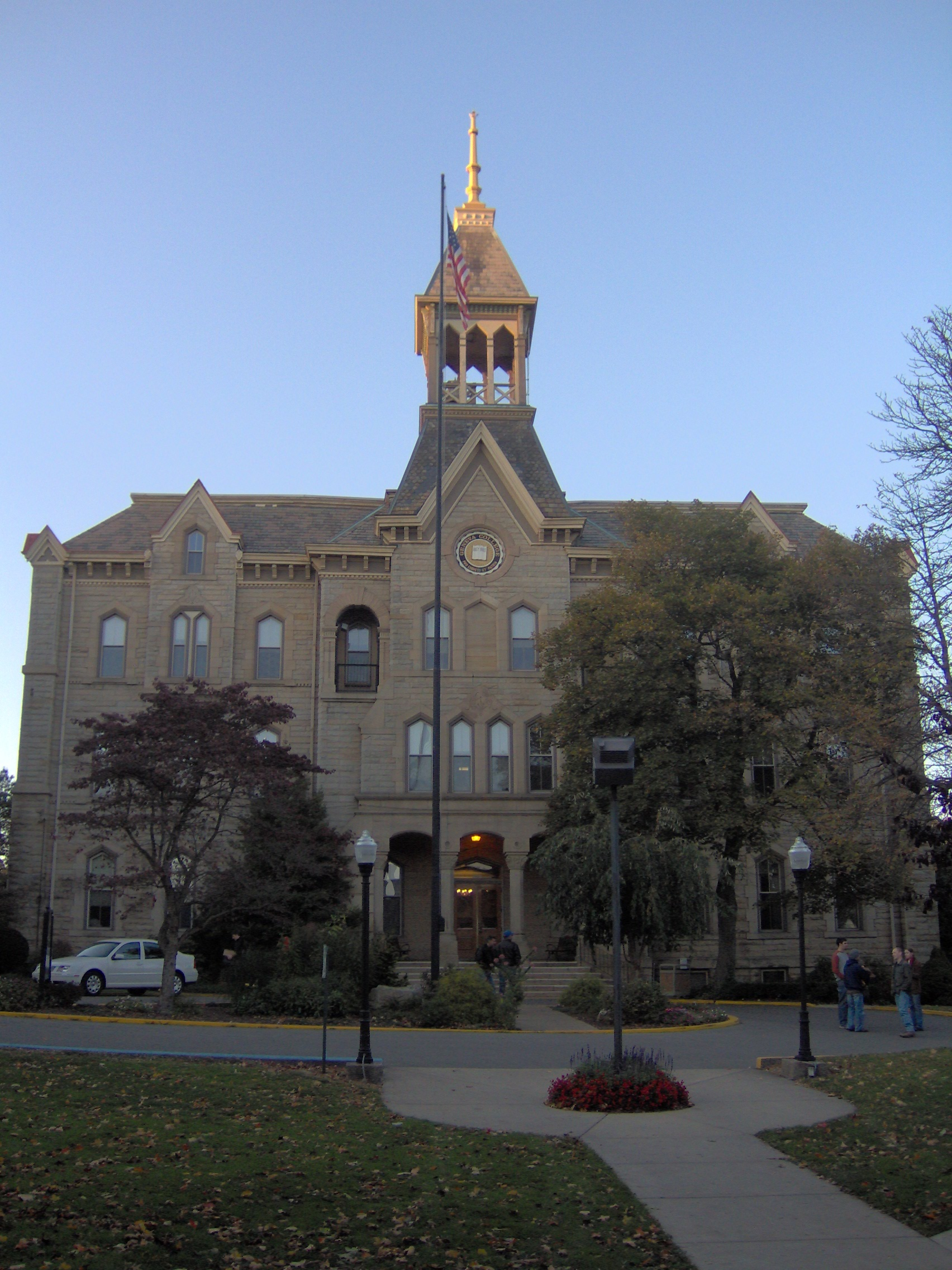
- Old Main's south façade
- Interactive map of the Old Main area

General information
- Type: academic building
- Location: 3200 College Avenue; Beaver Falls, PA 15010; United States
- Coordinates: 40.7724°N 80.3217°W
- Completed: 1880
- Opening: 1881
- Owner: Geneva College
- Management: Geneva College

Technical details
- Floor count: 3
- Lifts/elevators: 0

Design and construction
- Architect: James P. Bailey

Old Main is an academic building on the campus of Geneva College in Beaver Falls, Pennsylvania, United States. The structure was also the first building constructed on the campus, after the college left its original location in Northwood, Ohio. It was designed by Pittsburgh architect James P. Bailey.

== History ==
Old Main was constructed in 1880 by the local Pittsburgh architect, James P. Bailey, who later designed the Butler County Courthouse in Butler, Pennsylvania, and the First Presbyterian Church in Beaver, Pennsylvania.

The building opened its doors in the fall of 1881 as the first structure to be built on the new campus. Today, Old Main serves as a classroom building, and also houses the college's faculty, and administration offices.
