= Walter Lowrie House =

Walter Lowrie House may refer to:

- Walter Lowrie House (Princeton, New Jersey), the official residence of the president of Princeton University
- Sen. Walter Lowrie House, a historic home in Butler, Butler County, Pennsylvania
