= David Gentner =

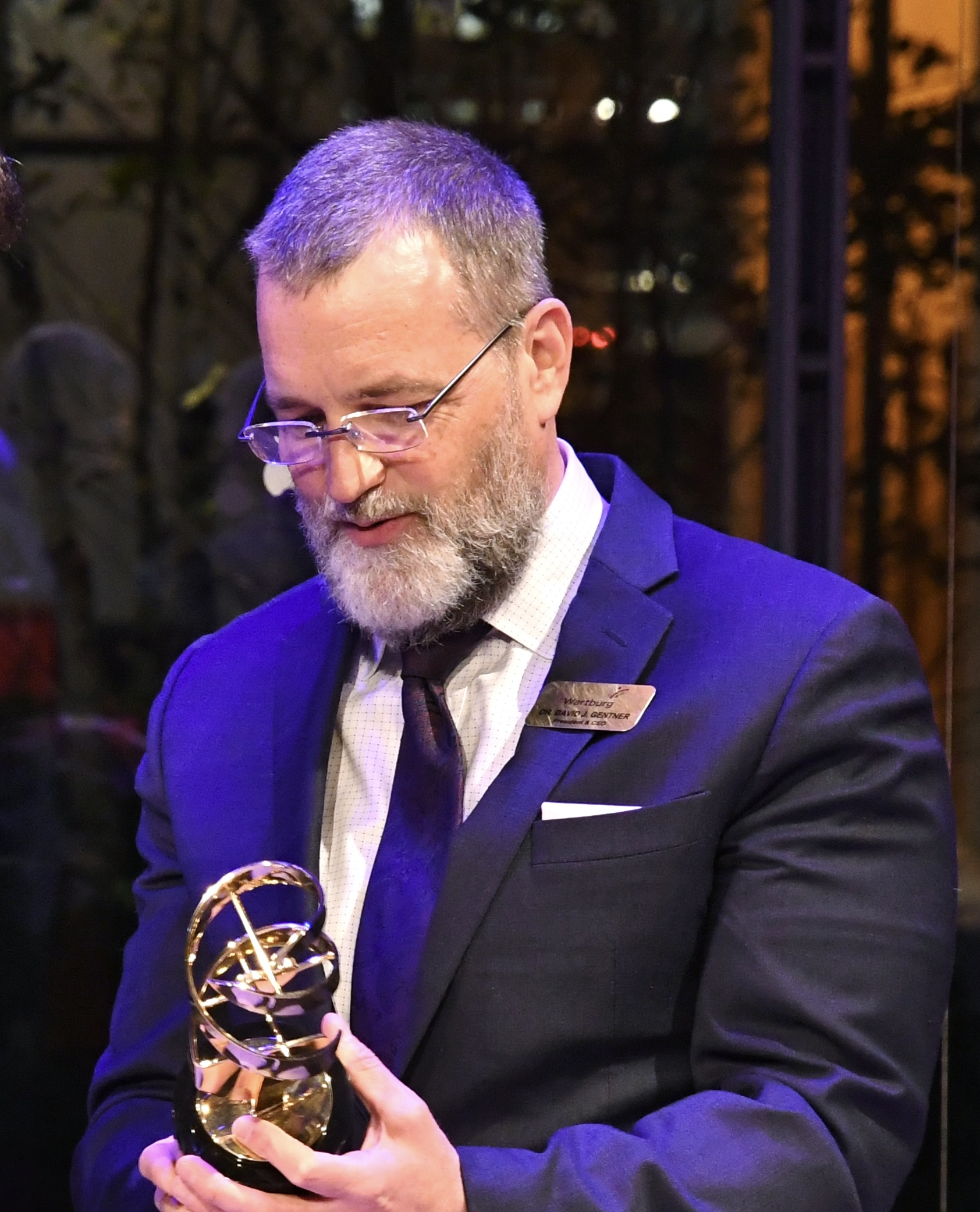
- Born: April 29, 1965
- Education: St. John Fisher University
- Known for: Research includes the areas of music, dementia, and quality of life in assisted living environments.
- Spouse: Jacqueline Gentner
- Website: wartburg.org

David Gentner is an American academic and healthcare administrator who serves as the 10th President of Wartburg organizations including IMNF in Mount Vernon, New York. He is the first individual to hold the shared office of President for both Wartburg and Wartburg Foundation.

== Career ==
He joined Wartburg (retirement community) in 2004 as the Vice President of Health Services. Before his tenure at Wartburg, he was president and CEO of Grace Manor Health Care Facility Inc. in Buffalo, New York.

In 2009, Gentner established the Council for Creative Aging and Lifelong Learning at Wartburg, offering arts-based activities. In 2017, Gentner and Wartburg partnered with the Institute for Music and Neurologic Function to help treat patients with dementia, stroke and Parkinson's disease.

== Awards and affiliations ==
Gentner has been recognized for his humanitarian efforts in the community. In 2005, he received the New York Association of Homes & Services for the Aging Thomas Clarke Memorial Award for his work as an administrator under the age of 40. In the same year, Gentner was named the American College of Health Care Administrator's New Administrator of the Year.

In 2016, Gentner and Wartburg received a 37th annual Telly Award in the Excellence Documentary category for a PBS documentary series. He received the Humanitarian Award from The Grace-Ujamaa Development Corporations in 2017. In 2019, he was presented with the Community Visionary Award by the Youth Shelter of Westchester for his efforts in providing care for older community members.

Gentner received a degree from St. John Fisher University, and his research includes music, dementia, and quality of life in assisted living environments. In 2017 Gentner presented his dissertation research at the 5th Annual World Congress of Geriatrics and Gerontology conference in Fukuoka, Japan. Gentner is on the board of directors of Music and Memory, a non-profit organization that helps individuals with a wide range of cognitive and physical conditions to engage with the world through the use of personalized music.
