= James P. Bailey =

American architect

James P. Bailey was an architect based in Pittsburgh, Pennsylvania. He is known for his churches and public buildings. He designed several buildings listed on the National Register of Historic Places.

Samuel Thornburg McClarren was a draftsman for him before establishing his own practice in Carnegie, Pennsylvania.

== Work ==
- Old Main (1880) at Geneva College in Beaver Falls, Pennsylvania
- Butler County Courthouse (1885) in Butler, Pennsylvania (NRHP)
- Former First Presbyterian Church (1888) at 101 S. Lafayette in South Bend, Indiana (NRHP)
- Monongalia County Courthouse (1891) in Morgantown, West Virginia (NRHP)
- First Methodist Episcopal Church (1895) at 301 Lincoln Way East in Massillon, Ohio (NRHP)
- West End Methodist Episcopal Church

== See also ==
- H. H. Richardson
