= Hobnob =

Hobnob, or similar terms may refer to:

- Hobnob biscuit, a brand of oat biscuit made by McVitie's
- Hobnob Theatre Company, a theater company in Butler, Pennsylvania

== See also ==
- Hob Nob Anyone?, a website for fans of Reading Football Club
- Hob (disambiguation)
- Hobby horse#Salisbury Giant and Hob-Nob
