= Institute for Music and Neurologic Function =

US nonprofit organization

Coordinates: 40°55′13″N 73°48′54″W

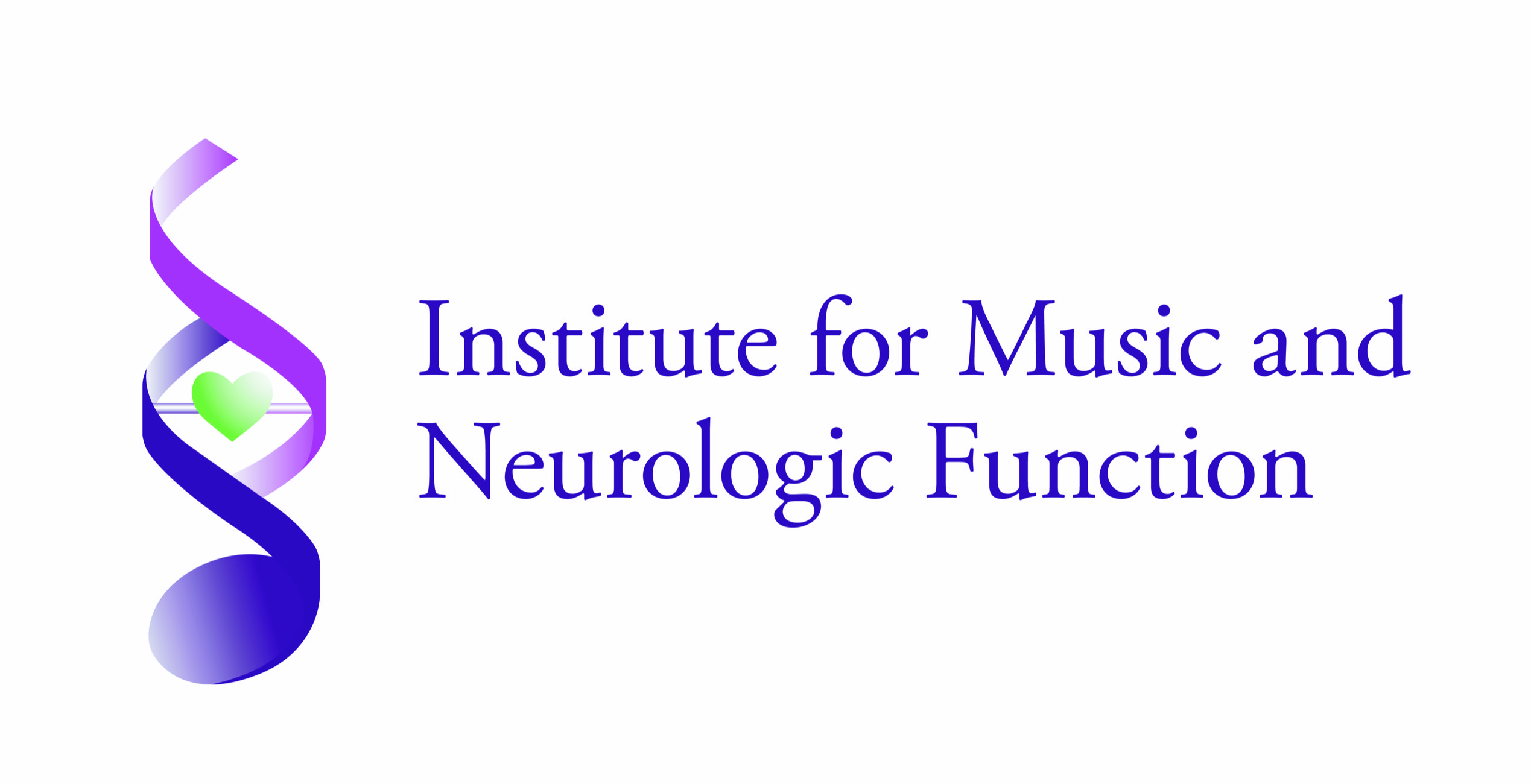
- Company type: Nonprofit
- Industry: Healthcare
- Founded: 1995, Mount Vernon, New York
- Founder: Concetta M. Tomaino
- Headquarters: New York, United States
- Key people: David Gentner (president); Harry Ballan (chairman); Concetta Tomaino (executive director)
- Website: imnf.org

The Institute for Music and Neurologic Function (IMNF) is a US nonprofit organization conducting research into and applying music therapy. It is located in Mount Vernon, New York.

== Mission ==
The mission of the institute is to develop and apply music-based therapies emanating from new discoveries and educational collaborations within the international research and treatment communities. Its aim is to restore, maintain and improve the physical, emotional and neurologic functioning in people who have been debilitated through stroke, trauma, dementia, Alzheimer's disease, Parkinson's and other processes through the systematic use of music. The director of the institute Dr. Concetta M. Tomaino states that "If you're stimulating almost every key component of our brain at one time, you have a way of reaching areas of the brain that are still functioning."

The institute claims results of their treatment such as regaining memory loss, rebuilding motor skills, calming and counteracting apprehension or fear, promoting movement for physical rehabilitation, and recovering language skills.

== History ==
The institute was formerly a member of the CenterLight Health System (formerly Beth Abraham Family of Health Services)—has for 35 years conducted clinical research studies on the effects of music on the human condition. The tax-exempt private foundation was founded in 1995. It is directed by music therapist Dr. Concetta M. Tomaino and was provided scientific guidance by neurologist Oliver Sacks, now deceased.

In 2017, the organization partnered with Wartburg (retirement community) to bring music to those with brain injuries, diseases, and other ailments.

In July 2022, The IMNF received a $13,000 grant from the Parkinson's Foundation for "Music Has Power® For Parkinson's." In January, 2023 research continues on modified music and synchronized light to treat Alzheimer's disease. Oscillo founder and Chief Science Officer (CSO) Edward Large, Ph.D., a professor at the University of Connecticut, states that despite $42.5 billion spent on research since 1995, there is still no cure for Alzheimer's: "This disease is growing at an alarming rate, and time is of the essence. We scientists need to look at new ways to treat the problem. Digital therapeutics such as ours are a growing category recognized by the FDA (Food & Drug Administration). Our treatment is showing very encouraging results, and we're excited that it is noninvasive, drug-free, well-tolerated and even enjoyable for patients to use."
