= St. Peter's Anglican Church (Butler, Pennsylvania) =

Historic Anglican church in Butler, Pennsylvania, United States

Coordinates: 40°51′41″N 79°53′34″W

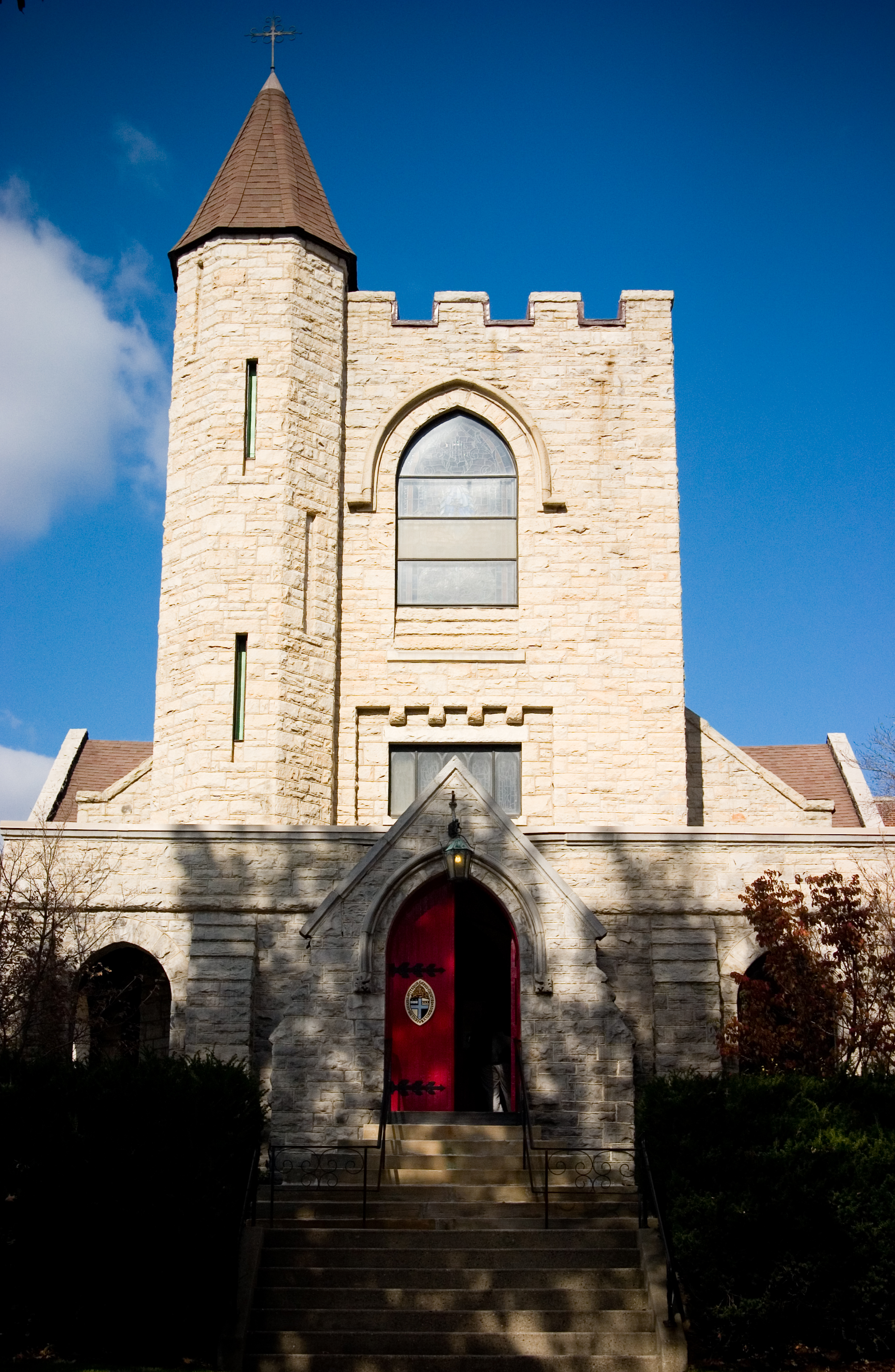
- St. Peter's Anglican Church
- Location: 218 East Jefferson Street, Butler, Pennsylvania
- Country: United States
- Denomination: Anglican Church in North America
- Website: butleranglicans.org

History
- Founded: 1824

Architecture
- Architect: William Halsey Wood
- Style: Gothic Revival
- Years built: 1895-96

Administration
- Diocese: Pittsburgh

Clergy
- Rector: The Rt. Rev. David L. Hicks
- St. Peter's Episcopal Church
- U.S. Historic district – Contributing property
- Part of: Butler Historic District (ID71992482)
- Added to NRHP: May 29, 2003

St. Peter's Anglican Church is a historic Anglican church in Butler, Pennsylvania. Completed in 1896, the church is a contributing property to the Butler Historic District. The church was designed by noted church architect William Halsey Wood.
