= Butler Transit Authority =

- Founded: 1989
- Headquarters: 130 Hollywood Drive; Butler, Pennsylvania
- Service area: Butler County, Pennsylvania
- Service type: Bus
- Routes: 8
- Fleet: 12 Buses
- Fuel type: CNG
- Website: www.butlertransitauthority.com

Butler Transit Authority, also known as theBus or the BTA, is a public transportation service in Butler, Pennsylvania. The service provides local transit in central Butler County and commuter routes from Butler to Pittsburgh. The BTA operates a fleet of 12 buses. The service transports nearly a quarter million passengers annually.

== History ==
The Butler Transit Authority traces its roots to the early 1980s, when the City of Butler Renaissance Commission started a local bus service to revitalize downtown. This service became the Butler Township-City Joint Municipal Transit Authority (BTCJMTA) in 1989. The BTCJMTA changed its name to the Butler Transit Authority in 2006. Since its founding, the Butler Transit Authority has expanded beyond its 4 original routes. An express route was added in the mid-1990s, which would become route 5 in 2011. In 2017, 4 commuter routes running from Butler to Pittsburgh were created. Along with the expansion of service, facilities and equipment have been upgraded over the years. A transit center consisting of an administrative office and bus garage was completed in 2010. The BTA started purchasing buses fueled with Compressed Natural Gas (CNG) in 2017 and in 2019 a new CNG fueling station was completed at the bus garage. In 2022, the addition of a training room, commuter waiting room, and Park n' Ride lot was completed at the transit center. In 2023, the last diesel fueled bus was sold.

== Local Service ==
Local service consists of 4 routes. These routes provide transportation in Butler Township, the City of Butler, Center Township, and Summit Township. All local routes offer weekday service and 3 offer a modified Saturday schedule. Free local service is offered to citizens over 65 years of age who have a PA State Senior Citizens Pass.

Weekday Routes and Major Destinations:

- Local 1 - Butler City/Pullman Square/Moraine Point/VA Hospital/Butler Commons/Terminal.
- Local 2/4 - Butler City/Butler Arbors/Sunnyview/BC3/Center Avenue/Terminal.
- Local 3 - Butler City/Clearview Mall/BHS/Care Center/Terminal.
- Local 5 - Butler City/Duffy RD. VA Health Center/Butler Commons/Butler Crossings/Terminal.

Saturday Routes and Major Destinations:

- Local 1 - Butler City/Pullman Square/Moraine Point/VA Hospital/Butler Commons/Terminal.
- Local 2/4 - Butler City/Butler Arbors/Sunnyview/BC3/Center Avenue/Terminal.
- Local 3 - Butler City/Clearview Mall/BHS/Care Center/Terminal.

== Commuter Service ==
Commuter service consists of 4 routes running from Butler to Pittsburgh. Commuter routes 1 and 2 operate via PA Route 8 and PA Route 28. Commuter routes 3 and 4 operate via PA Route 68, I-79, and I-279. Park N' Rides along the route provide a place for riders to park their vehicles and board the bus. Commuter service is only offered on weekdays. Free commuter service is offered to citizens over 65 years of age who have a PA State Senior Citizens Pass.

Commuter Routes and Number of Daily Trips:

- Commuter Route 1 - 1 Southbound Trip, 1 Northbound Trip.
- Commuter Route 2 - 2 Round Trips.
- Commuter Route 3 - 2 Round Trips.
- Commuter Route 4 - 1 Southbound Trip, 1 Northbound Trip.

Park N' Ride Lots:

- Commuter Routes 1 and 2 - Pullman Square Park N' Ride, Glade Run Church, and Duncan Avenue.
- Commuter Routes 3 and 4 - Pullman Square Park N' Ride, Edco Park (unavailable between Memorial Day and Labor Day weekend), Route 528 Park N' Ride.

== Fleet ==
The Butler Transit Authority maintains a fleet of 12 buses. All 12 buses in regular service are fueled with compressed natural gas (CNG). All buses are handicap accessible. Combined, Butler Transit Authority buses travel nearly 200,000 miles annually.

Current Buses:

- 1 2022 45-Foot MCI D4500 Commuter Bus (CNG).
- 3 2019 29-Foot Gillig Local Buses (CNG).
- 3 2017 29-Foot Gillig Local Buses (CNG).
- 5 2017 45-Foot MCI D4500 Commuter Buses (CNG).

Former Buses:

- 1 2007 30-Foot Gillig Phantom Trolley Bus (Diesel).
