= Preston Laboratories =

- U.S. National Register of Historic Places
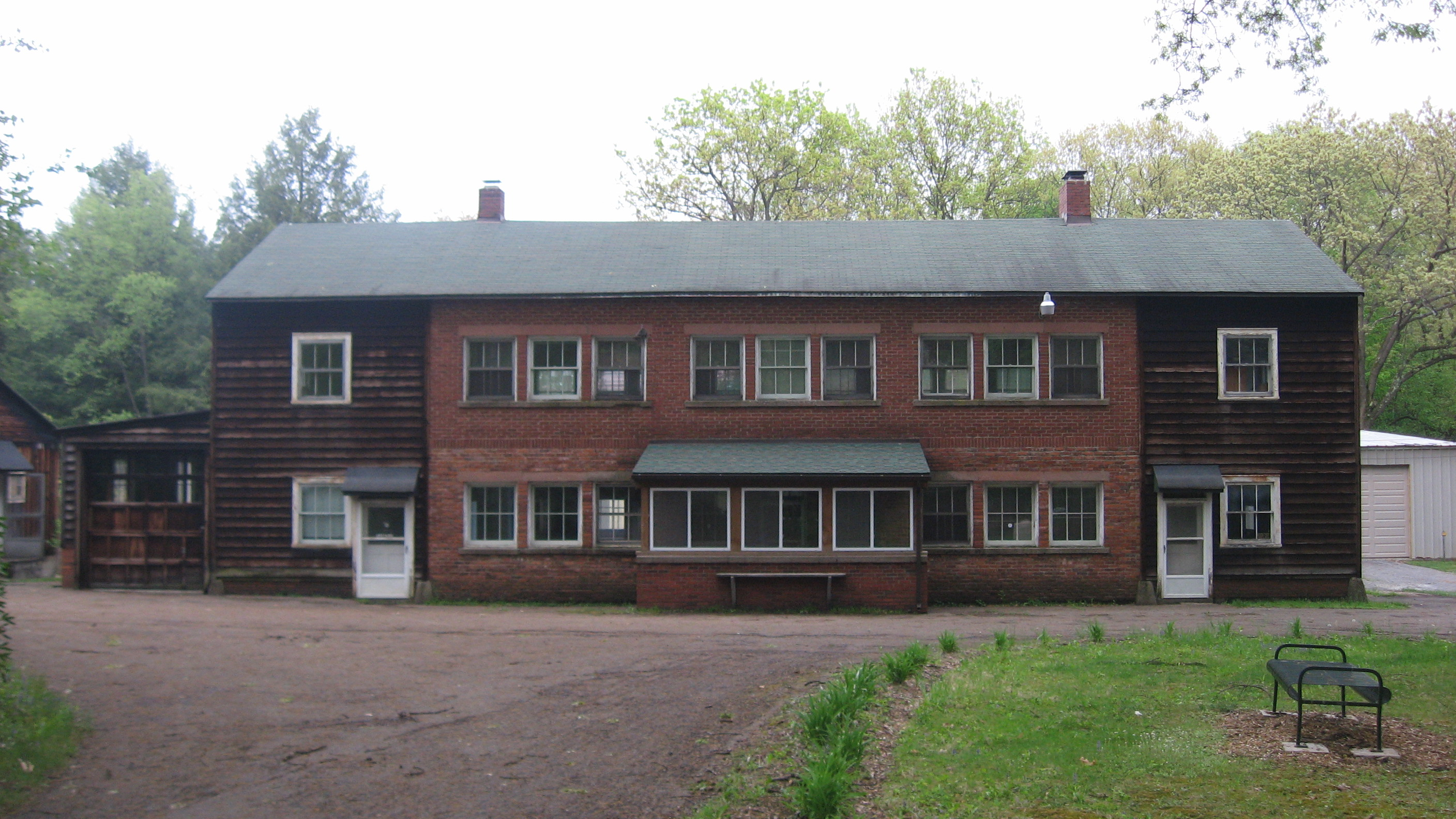
- Preston Laboratories building, May 2013

- Location within Pennsylvania Location within the United States
- Location: 415 S. Eberhart Road, west of Butler, Butler, Pennsylvania
- Coordinates: 40°51′12″N 79°57′00″W
- Area: 87.5 acres (35.4 ha)
- Built: 1936
- Architect: Edwin Howard
- NRHP reference No.: 12001095
- Added to NRHP: December 26, 2012

Preston Laboratories is a historic glass science research facility located near Butler, Pennsylvania. The 87.5 acre site encompasses 7 contributing buildings, 2 contributing sites, 2 contributing structures, and 2 contributing objects. The main laboratory building construction began in 1936, with minor buildings added in the 1950s. The property was abandoned in 1959, following the death of the laboratory's founder, Dr. Frank Preston. The property is now used as a township park.

It was listed on the National Register of Historic Places in 2012.
