= Saxonburg Historic District =

Historic district in Pennsylvania, United States

- U.S. National Register of Historic Places
- U.S. Historic district
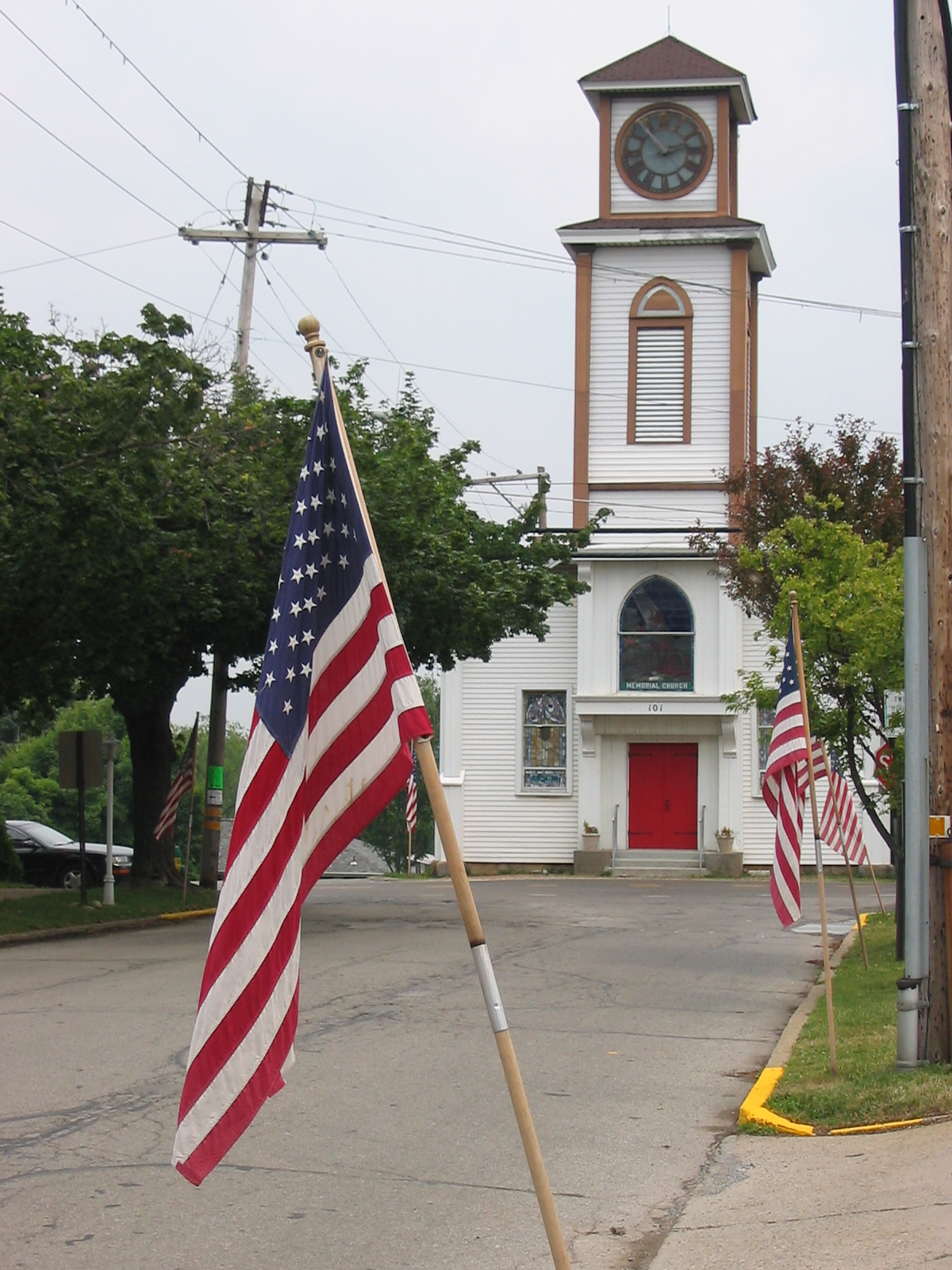
- Memorial United Presbyterian Church, Saxonburg Historic District, July 2005

- Location within Pennsylvania Location within the United States
- Location: Portions of E. and W. Main, N. and S. Rebecca, N. and S. Isabella, Pittsburgh, Butler, and State Sts., Saxonburg, Pennsylvania
- Coordinates: 40°45′00″N 79°49′08″W
- Area: 9 acres (3.6 ha)
- Built: 1831-1952
- Architectural style: Greek Revival, Gothic Revival, et al.
- NRHP reference No.: 03000035
- Added to NRHP: February 14, 2003

The Saxonburg Historic District is a national historic district that is located in Saxonburg, Butler County, Pennsylvania.

It was listed on the National Register of Historic Places in 1976.

== History and architectural features ==
This district includes fifty-four contributing buildings and two contributing objects that are located in the central business district and surrounding residential area of Saxonburg. It includes residential, commercial, and institutional buildings built between 1831 and 1952 in a number of popular architectural styles, including Greek Revival and Gothic Revival.

The original town was laid out in 1831 by prominent civil engineer John A. Roebling. Notable buildings include the Helmbold House, the Hotel Saxonburg, the Kuntz-Steubgen House, the Maurhoff Building, the Kohnfelder Building, St. Luke's Lutheran Church, and the Memorial United Presbyterian Church. Also located in the district but listed separately is the John Roebling House. Approximately seventy percent of the resources in the district pre-date 1900, twenty percent were constructed between 1900 and 1930, and the remaining ten percent post-date 1930. Approximately eighty percent of the buildings are of a residential character; the balance are of a commercial or institutional character.
