= List of Pennsylvania state historical markers in Butler County =

Location of Butler County in Pennsylvania

This is a list of the Pennsylvania state historical markers in Butler County.

This is intended to be a complete list of the official state historical markers placed in Butler County, Pennsylvania by the Pennsylvania Historical and Museum Commission (PHMC). The locations of the historical markers, as well as the latitude and longitude coordinates as provided by the PHMC's database, are included below when available. There are 15 historical markers located in Butler County.

== Historical markers ==
Marker title	Image	Date dedicated	Location	Marker type	Topics
Butler County		June 11, 1982	County Courthouse, Main Street (PA 8), Butler; 40.85857°N 79.89545°W	City	George Washington, Government & Politics, Government & Politics 19th Century, Religion
General Richard Butler - PLAQUE		May 1, 1917	County Courthouse, Butler; 40.85857°N 79.89545°W	Plaque	American Revolution, Ethnic & Immigration, Military
George Edward Waddell		July 26, 2003	Main Street (PA 488) at Moraine Elementary School, Prospect; 40.904624°N 80.042599°W	Roadside	Baseball, Sports
George Washington		February 15, 1970	PA 68, 1.8 miles northeast of Evans City (MISSING)	Roadside	Forts, French & Indian War, George Washington, Military, Native American
Harmonist Cemetery		October 3, 1947	Evans City Road (PA 68) & Edmonds Road, Harmony; 40.80177°N 80.1237°W	Roadside	Religion
Harmony		October 3, 1947	Main Street at Mercer Street in Harmony; 40.80267°N 80.12785°W	Roadside	Religion
Harmony Mennonites		October 3, 1947	Perry Highway (US 19) & Mennonite Lane, north of Zelienople; 40.80927°N 80.12942°W	Roadside	Religion
Invention of the Jeep		October 17, 1993	Hansen Avenue and Renaissance Avenue, Butler; 40.85713°N 79.9116°W	Roadside	Business & Industry, Military, Military Post-Civil War, Transportation
Old Stone House		1968	At site, PA 8 & PA 173, Stone House; 41.012617°N 80.002126°W	Roadside	Buildings, Business & Industry, Houses & Homesteads
Old Stone House		1968	At site, PA 8 & PA 173, Stone House (MISSING)	Roadside	Buildings, Business & Industry, Houses & Homesteads
Rev. Richard C. Christy		2004	At church, 455 Clearfield Road, Fenelton; 40.842750°N 79.742983°W	Roadside	Civil War, Religion
Roeblings, The		October 6, 1947	Butler Street near High Street, Saxonburg; 40.755155°N 79.818095°W	Roadside	Bridges, Business & Industry, Invention, Professions & Vocations, Transportation
Venango Path		February 18, 1995	Franklin Road at Mars Crider Road (PA 228), Cranberry Township; 40.6856°N 80.07512°W	Roadside	Forts, George Washington, Military, Native American, Paths & Trails, Roads, Transportation
William A. Smith		January 1, 1955	North Pike Road (PA 356) & Cooper Road, Cabot; 40.7684°N 79.78732°W	Roadside	Business & Industry, Oil & Gas, Professions & Vocations
Zelienople		October 3, 1947	North Main Street/ Perry Highway (US 19) at Connoquenessing Creek, Zelienople; 40.8°N 80.13795°W	Roadside	Buildings, Cities & Towns

== See also ==
- List of Pennsylvania state historical markers
- National Register of Historic Places listings in Butler County, Pennsylvania
