= VA Butler Healthcare =

Agency overview
- Formed: April 1946
- Jurisdiction: Federal government of the United States
- Headquarters: 325 New Castle Rd Butler, Pennsylvania United States
- Employees: Over 600

VA Butler Healthcare is a Health Care Center operated by the Department of Veteran Affairs. Serving over 22,000 veterans in Western Pennsylvania and Eastern Ohio. The hospital is located on a 90-acre campus on New Castle Road (PA Route 356) in Butler Township, Butler County, Pennsylvania.

The medical center is part of the VISN 4. It consists of a central facility and five Community Based Outpatient Clinics, providing primary care, behavioral health, specialized extended care, physical rehabilitation medicine, and residential substance abuse treatment.

The outpatient programs generate approximately 175,000 visits per year. Specialized care is available through the following programs: respite care, homeless veterans program, mental hygiene clinic, home based primary care, community health care, hospice, adult day health care, Women Veteran Health and Returning Veteran Transition.

VA Butler completed a $16 million project to build a new 60-bed Community Living Center (CLC) on June 11, 2014. The CLC is located next to the current main facility.

VA Butler's 56-bed Domiciliary will provides residential rehabilitation for Veterans suffering from substance abuse, homelessness and behavioral health issues. The program currently offers 56 domiciliary beds and 10 compensated work (CWT) therapy beds.

VA Butler Healthcare also operates five Community Based Outpatient Clinics that provide veterans with access to care in their community.

On December 31, 2014, the VA announced that a new VA Butler Health Care Center will be built on 45-acre (18 ha) of farmland in neighboring Center Township, at 353 North Duffy Road. The facility will be built by Cambridge Healthcare Solutions PA, LP of Vienna, Virginia. The facility will be a two-story, 168,000 square foot building that will replace most of the services at the current main building at the New Castle Road campus built in the 1930s.The new Health Care Center will open for business on September 5, 2017.

== History ==
VA Butler Healthcare's history began in 1937 when the Pennsylvania Department of Health chose Butler as the site for a Tuberculosis Sanitarium. During World War II, the hospital served as a Soldier's hospital and in 1942, the U.S. Army Medical Department leased the property. In April 1946, the Veteran Administration started its operation and purchased the facility in 1948.
