= William Passavant =

Pennsylvania Lutheran minister (1821–1894)

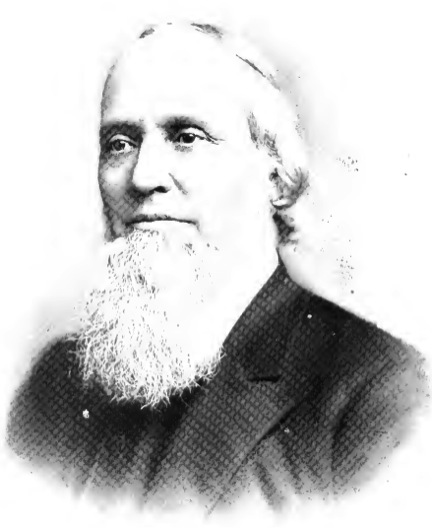
- Rev. William A. Passavant

Prophetic Witness
- Born: October 9, 1821; Zelienople, Pennsylvania, US
- Died: June 3, 1894; Pittsburgh, Pennsylvania, US
- Venerated in: Lutheran Church
- Feast: 3 January

William Alfred Passavant (October 9, 1821 – June 3, 1894) was a Lutheran minister who brought the Lutheran Deaconess movement to the United States. He is commemorated in the Calendar of Saints of the Lutheran Church on November 24 with Justus Falckner and Jehu Jones.

== Early life ==
William Alfred Passavant was born in 1821 in Zelienople, Pennsylvania, the third and youngest son of Phillipe Louis Passavant and Fredericka Wilhelmina Basse (nicknamed "Zelie," hence the town's name). His grandfather, Baron Dettmar Basse, born in Iserlohn in the Ruhr Valley in what was then the Grand Duchy of Hesse and later became Germany, spent a decade in Paris as a diplomat and merchant before fleeing the Napoleonic Wars and emigrating to Philadelphia and then Pittsburgh in 1801. Drawn by the prospect of religious freedom and economic opportunity, the widower Baron bought 10,000 acres along Connoquenessing Creek in Butler County, Pennsylvania, began building a stone, brick, and wood framed castle, and founded (with Christian Buhl) a new town complete with sawmill, brickyard, and an iron furnace. He also traveled and sent glowing letters back to Germany, persuading his daughter and her new husband (a French Huguenot who fled after repeal of the Edict of Nantes) to emigrate in 1807 from Frankfurt.

Phillipe Passavant built a store and became the new town's first merchant. The Baron experienced financial reverses at the war's end, and eventually sold Bassenheim to Daniel Beltzhoover and headed back to Germany in 1818, dying in Mannheim in 1836. It was resold to a Mr. Saunders, who ran a Presbyterian school on the site (attended by young William Passavant as well as his lifelong friend the future Rev. George Wenzel) until it was hit by lightning and burned down on July 29, 1841. Meanwhile, the Baron had also sold half his land to the Harmonites, a pietist sect led by Johann Georg Rapp and his brother Frederick, who then founded Harmony, Pennsylvania, but eventually sold their colony to Abraham Zeigler who moved it further west, to New Harmony, Indiana.

Young Passavant and Wenzel crossed the Allegheny Mountains to attend Jefferson College in Canonsburg, Pennsylvania. In addition to his studies, Passavant taught Sunday school and sold subscriptions to the Lutherische Kirchenzeitung (published in Philadelphia beginning in 1838), as well as an English-language Reform magazine, the Observer. Realizing that he needed Wenzel's tutoring in German, and that other American-born Lutherans faced similar problems, Passavant tried unsuccessfully to persuade the Philadelphia publisher to publish a Lutheran almanac in English. While at college, where Passavant attended the Presbyterian services offered, he learned his sister Emma had married an amiable Presbyterian minister, Sidney Jennings.

After taking a year off from his studies due to the unexpected death of his eldest brother, Detmar, in Pittsburgh, Passavant entered the Gettysburg Seminary under Samuel Schmucker to prepare for a pastoral career. Among his classmates was Charles Porterfield Krauth, son of the President of Gettysburg College and who later led the neo-Lutheran movement Passavant ultimately joined. There, Passavant continued his Sunday School work, and also canvassed for the Pennsylvania Bible Society, sought funds for the Protestant mission in Cincinnati, Ohio, and attended revival meetings that his father considered too Methodistic.

== Career ==
Passavant received his license and began his ministry as well as his publishing career in Baltimore, Maryland, in 1842. Ordained in 1843, he published the Lutheran Almanac for its first two years, before passing that project to others. Another project was a Sunday School hymn book. Passavant also met his future wife, Eliza Walter, although he felt his finances were not secure enough to support a family. In 1844, Passavant accepted the repeated calls of a struggling Pittsburgh congregation: First English Evangelical Lutheran Church. During his time as their fifth pastor (1844-1855), he helped to increase the overall membership and steered the congregation towards public outreach. After moving to that city, Passavant organized the Pittsburgh Synod. By its second meeting, he had already established six Sunday schools, some with the help of other Protestant clergy.

Passavant married Eliza Walter on May 1, 1845, shortly after his friend Krauth married, despite a fire in Pittsburgh's business district three weeks earlier that had devastated many of his parishioners. The newlyweds spent their honeymoon with the meeting of the Evangelical Lutheran General Synod of the United States America in Philadelphia, as well as visited friends and relatives in Baltimore.

The following year, Passavant traveled to Europe as the region's delegate to the Christian Alliance in London in August 1846. He also toured historic sites in England, France, and Germany, and managed to secure promises of Lutheran missionaries from Basel, Switzerland. While in Germany, Passavant met Pastor Theodore Fliedner who had opened a hospital and training school for deaconesses in Kaiserswerth, near Düsseldorf and the Basse family's traditional estates. At Passavant's request, in 1849, Fliedner brought four German deaconesses to Pittsburgh to work in the Pittsburgh Infirmary (later Passavant Hospital until merging with the University of Pittsburgh Medical Center).

Especially after his Continental tour, Passavant became known for addressing important social issues, including slavery before the American Civil War (in which he served as a chaplain) and the needs of German and Scandinavian immigrants and freed blacks. Passavant founded and administered a variety of benevolent institutions, particularly in his native country's industrializing cities. He noted the comparable apostolic deaconesses, as well as the Sisters of Charity (a Roman Catholic order founded by St. Vincent DePaul), the Mennonite nursing deaconesses in the Netherlands, and Elizabeth Fry's work in England.

The sabbatical also convinced Passavant of the importance of the Augsburg Confession in Lutheran doctrine. Although Presbyterians and Episcopalians joined in welcoming the Protestant deaconesses, the Pittsburgh hospital refused to allow proselytizing or discrimination on the basis of color or creed, and Passavant brought his Protestant deaconesses to work with Dorothea Dix in Civil War hospitals treating both Union and Confederate wounded, Passavant broke with the pan-Protestant ethos of his former mentors Schmucker and Kurtz. The Pittsburgh Synod, following his lead, did not fully join the General Synod in 1853, despite discussions during several sessions, but reserved the right to withdraw, which it exercised in 1864. Moreover, in 1848 Passavant began publishing the monthly Missionary, to compete with the increasingly controversial Lutheran Observer, and in 1861 merged his periodical into Krauth's The Lutheran of Philadelphia, with Passavant continuing as co-editor of the Lutheran and Missionary. After the war, in 1867, Passavant assisted Krauth in organizing the rival General Council.

After his father's death in 1858, Passavant accepted a position as pastor of Christ Lutheran Church in Baden, Pennsylvania, along the Ohio River, where he served for 21 years (until 1879), while also traveling, publishing, and corresponding both within the United States and abroad. In 1863, he established an orphanage for girls in Rochester, Pennsylvania, in addition to the one in Zelienople, which he had established in 1854, using a small inheritance after his sister Victoria's death and to honor their still-living mother (with whom Passavant remained close until she died in 1870). The deaconesses also taught and worked with female prisoners in Allegheny County.

Passavant founded many missions, as well as hospitals in Pittsburgh, Milwaukee, and Chicago, homes for epileptics at Jacksonville, Illinois, and Rochester, Pennsylvania, and an orphanage as well as an old peoples' home in Mt. Vernon, New York. Beginning in 1866, Passavant and Louis Thiel worked to establish Thiel College, which the Pittsburgh Synod's 1869 convention in Greensburg, Pennsylvania, approved to serve western Pennsylvania, and which formally incorporated on September 1, 1870. One of the last institutions Passavant founded was the Chicago Lutheran Theological Seminary. Many of the social welfare institutions Passavant founded would later join as the Lutheran Services in America, the largest church social program in the United States.

== Death and legacy ==
From 1881, two years before Knauth's death, to his own death in 1894, Passavant edited The Workman. His son and namesake, William Passavant Jr., turned down an invitation to lead a Philadelphia congregation to continue his father's work as a pastor and editor of the Workman during his lifetime. The elder Passavant died in his Pittsburgh home after falling ill attending a fellow pastor's funeral.

His son resigned his position heading the General Council's Home Missions effort to assume further duties with the deaconesses and other charities his father fostered, but he himself died in 1901. The house in which Passavant was born, Passavant House, is now Zelienople's local history museum and listed on the National Register of Historic Places.

== Notable institutions organized ==
- The Orphans' Home and Farm School in Zelienople, Pennsylvania (now Glade Run Lutheran Services)
- The Passavant Epileptic Home in Rochester, Pennsylvania (now Passavant Memorial Homes)
- Passavant Hospital in Pittsburgh, Pennsylvania (now UPMC Passavant Hospital)
- Passavant Hospital in Chicago, Illinois (now Passavant Memorial Hospital)
- Passavant Hospital in Jacksonville, Illinois (now Passavant Area Hospital)
- Passavant Hospital in Milwaukee, Wisconsin (now Aurora Sinai Medical Center). The building that once housed the hospital is also listed on the National Register of Historic Places.
- The Wartburg Orphans' Farm School in Mount Vernon, New York (now The Wartburg Adult Care Community)

== Other sources ==
- Gerberding, G.H., LIFE AND LETTERS OF W. A. Passavant, D. D., Illinois Historical Society, 1909 at https://archive.org/stream/lifelettersofwap00gerb/lifelettersofwap00gerb_djvu.txt
- Jennings, Zelie Some account of Dettmar Basse, the Passavant family and their arrival in America (Zelienople Historical Society. 1988)
- Solberg, Carl. "Passavant Revisited," Concordia Historical Institute Quarterly (2002) 75#4 pp 194–202. short scholarly biography
