= Concetta M. Tomaino =

American music therapist

- Born: July 30, 1954 (age 72); Bronx, New York, U.S.
- Employer(s): Institute for Music and Neurologic Function (IMNF)
- Known for: Music Therapy
- Spouse: Walter Barrett

Concetta Tomaino (born July 30, 1954), is the executive director and co-founder of the Institute for Music and Neurologic Function (IMNF). Tomaino is internationally known for her research in the clinical applications of music and neurologic rehabilitation.

== Biography ==
Born and raised in New York City (the daughter of a green-grocer and what was then called a 'stay-at-home' mom), Concetta Tomaino made her connection to music early, adopting the trumpet as her instrument of choice (as it remains to this day, though it is joined by the piano and accordion, her main choice for therapy). The first woman in her family to attend college, Concetta enrolled at Long Island's Stony Brook University in 1972 as a biology major, but, by her junior year, a continuing passion for music moved her to change her major to music.

Forming a synaptic-like connection between music and medicine, Concetta turned her energies to music therapy, creating independent study courses because there was no music therapy program at Stony Brook. Tomaino graduated from Stony Brook University in 1976 with a Bachelor of Arts in Music Performance and minors in psychology and sciences.

By 1980, Tomaino had joined Beth Abraham as the only music therapist (then part of the facilities department of recreation) and began to notice patients in the dementia unit responding positively and in some cases with remarkable speed, to music. She delved deeper into the neurological underpinnings as it became clear that music therapy had more to offer patients than a mere diversion from their everyday existence.

It was at Beth Abraham in 1980 that she became acquainted with the acclaimed visiting neurologist in long-term care, Oliver Sacks. The author of a breakthrough book called Awakenings (later made into a movieI), Tomaino found a valuable ally in Sacks when it came to championing the benefits of music therapy. In his 2007 book, Musicophilia: Tales of Music and the Brain which is dedicated to Tomaino, (Knopf, 2007) Sacks recounts case-examples of their long collaboration, adding that Connie Tomaino "has been my co-worker and adviser in all matters musical for more than twenty-five years."

In addition to her contributions with Sacks (including his 1995 volume An Anthropologist on Mars), Tomaino's work has been featured in such other books as A Matter of Dignity by Andrew Potok, The Mozart Effect by Don Campbell, Sounds of Healing by Mitchell Gaynor, M.D. and Age Protectors (Rodale Press), and covered by television programs and networks including 60 Minutes and 48 Hours.

Tomaino earned a master's degree and Doctor of Arts in Music Therapy from New York University in 1998.

== Awards and affiliations ==
A past president of the American Association for Music Therapy, Tomaino is the recipient of multiple honors and awards, most notably the Award of Accomplishment from Music Therapists for Peace at the United Nations; the Touchstone Award from the organization Women In Music, and the Zella Bronfman Butler Award (from the UJA-Federation of New York and the J.E. and Z.B. Butler Foundation) for “outstanding work on behalf of individuals with physical, developmental or learning disabilities." She was honored with the Music Has Power Award in 2004 for her contributions to the field of music therapy and for her vision, leadership, research, and service to the Institute for Music and Neurologic Function. In February 2008 America.gov, the website of the U.S. Department of State’s Bureau of International Information Programs, listed Tomaino as one of the innovators that help reshape reality.

In addition to her responsibilities as executive director of the Institute for Music and Neurologic Function, Tomaino is a member of the faculty of the Albert Einstein College of Medicine and Lehman College, CUNY.

Previously, she sat on the Certification Board of Music Therapists, the Journal of Music Therapy, and was a member of the advisory boards for the Center for Alternative Research at the Kessler Institute, and the International Journal of the Arts. She was a Super Panelist participant in the GRAMMY in the Schools program and worked as an adjunct clinical supervisor for several music therapy programs in the New York area.
