= Butler County National Bank =

- U.S. National Register of Historic Places
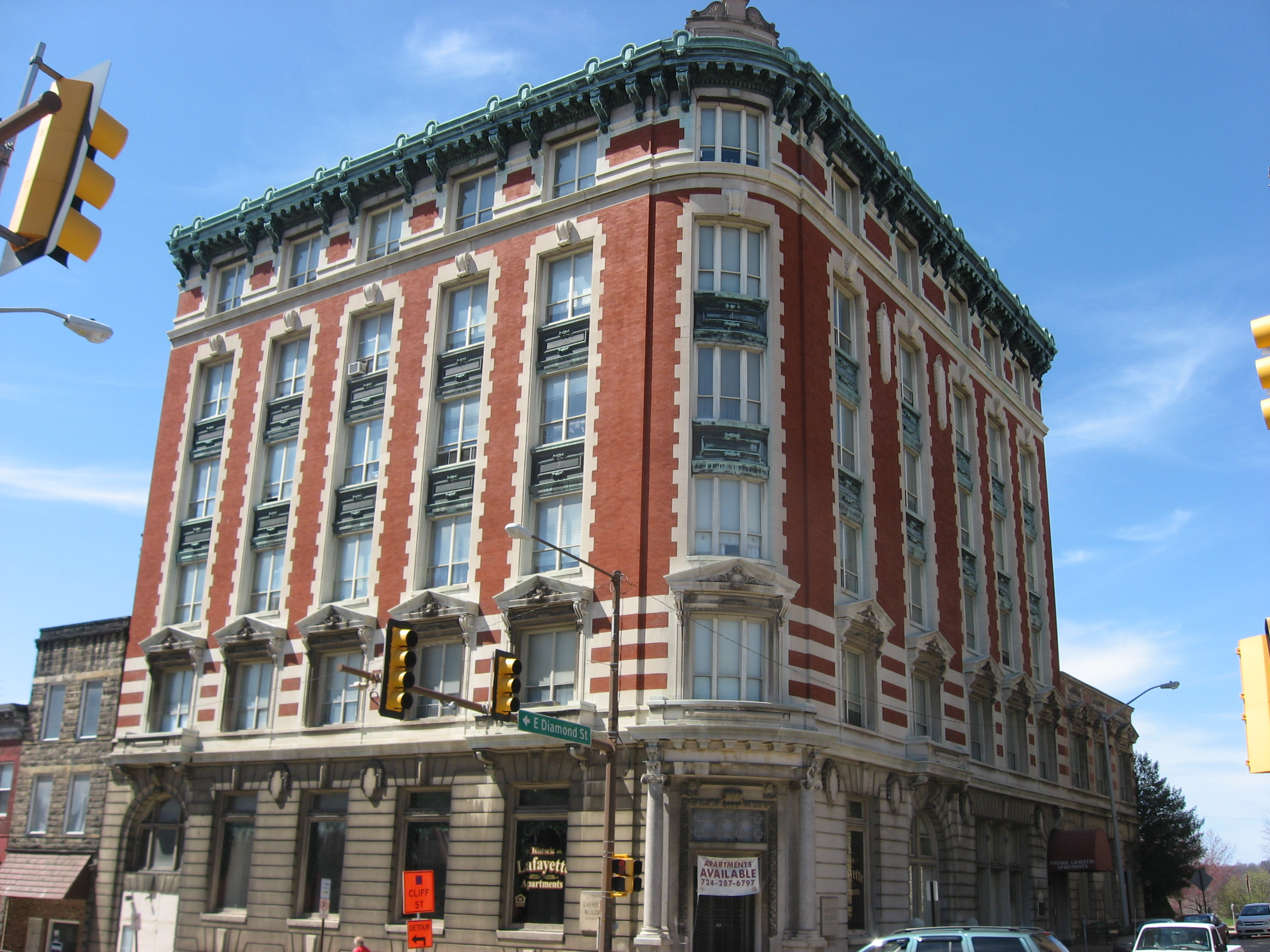
- Butler County National Bank, April 2009

- Location within Pennsylvania Location within the United States
- Location: 302 S. Main St., Butler, Pennsylvania
- Coordinates: 40°51′29″N 79°53′43″W
- Area: less than one acre
- Built: 1903
- Built by: Shenk, H. L., Company
- Architect: Mowbray and Uffinger
- Architectural style: Renaissance
- NRHP reference No.: 95001251
- Added to NRHP: November 7, 1995

The Butler County National Bank, also known as the Lafayette Building and Butler Branch Mellon Bank, is an historic bank building which is located in Butler, Butler County, Pennsylvania. Situated next to the Butler County Courthouse, it is considered the first "skyscraper" to have been erected in Butler.

It was listed on the National Register of Historic Places in 1991.

== History and architectural features ==
Built between 1902 and 1903, this historic structure is a six-story, five-bay-by-five-bay, brick and stone building, which was designed in the French Renaissance Revival style. A two-story addition was erected in 1929. The front entrance is placed within a curved section at the ninety-degree corner facing Diamond Park. The building housed Butler's post office from 1903 to 1913. Between 1992 and 1993, the building was renovated and converted into an apartment building.
