= Hobnob Theatre Company =

American theater company

- Address: Butler, Pennsylvania; United States

Construction
- Opened: 2012

Website
- http://www.hobnobtheatre.com

Hobnob Theatre Company is a theater company located in Butler, Pennsylvania. It was established in 2012, and opened with a production of Charles Dickens' A Christmas Carol in December of that year.

In June 2013, Hobnob staged a production of William Shakespeare's The Tempest. In December, Hobnob again produced A Christmas Carol. The company, along with the actor playing Scrooge (Jeff Carey), was featured in an interactive article on the New York Times' website.
