= Passavant House =

Historic house in Pennsylvania, United States

- U.S. National Register of Historic Places
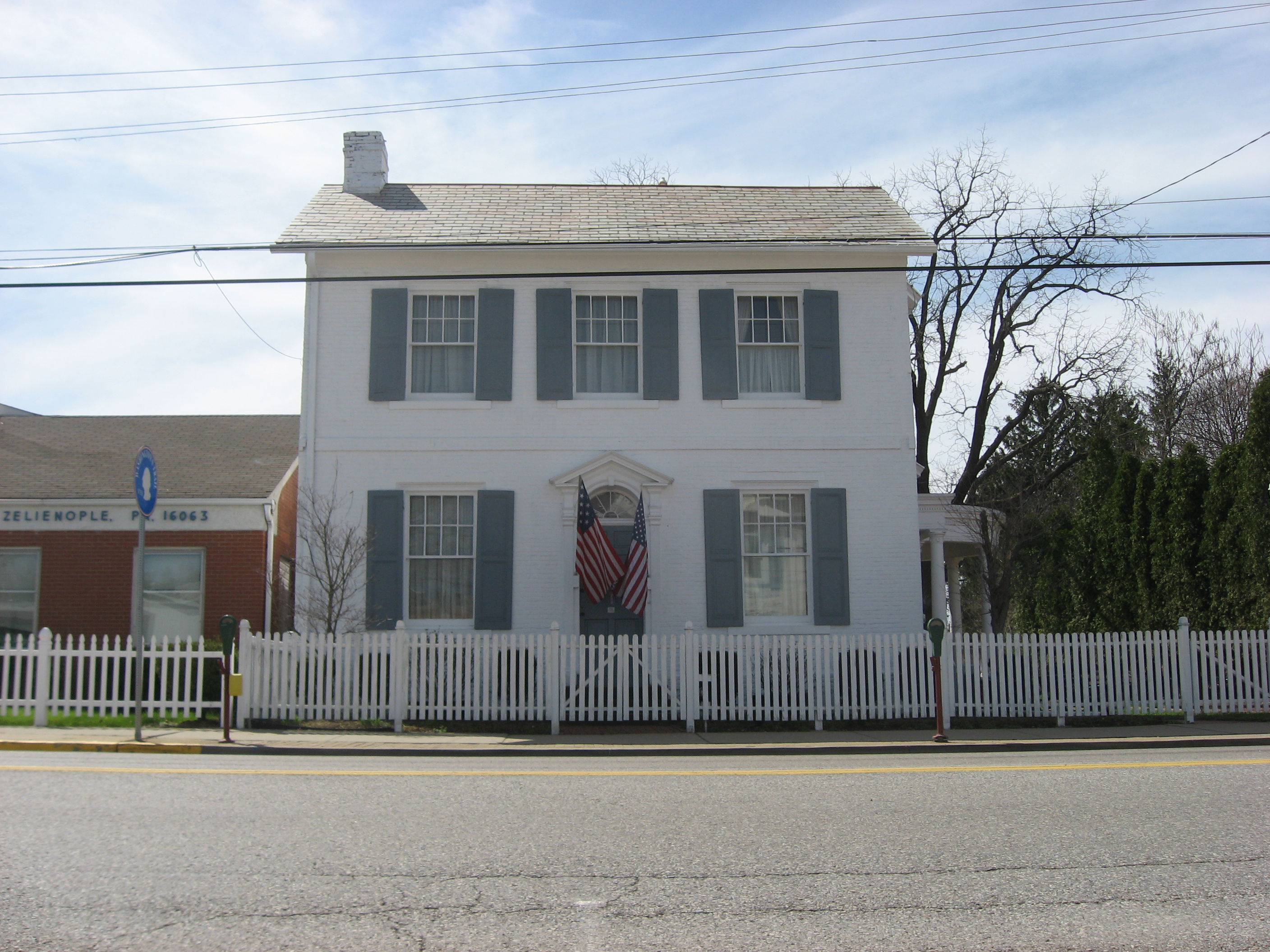
- Passavant House, April 2009

- Location within Pennsylvania Location within the United States
- Interactive map showing the location of Passavant House
- Location: 243 S. Main St., Zelienople, Pennsylvania
- Coordinates: 40°47′35″N 80°8′13″W
- Area: less than one acre
- Built: 1808, c. 1820
- Built by: Passavant, Phillip Louis
- NRHP reference No.: 77001133
- Added to NRHP: April 11, 1977

The Passavant House is an historic home that is located at 243 S. Main St. in Zelienople, Butler County, Pennsylvania, United States.

Built in 1808, it was listed on the National Register of Historic Places in 1977 because it was the boyhood home of Rev. William Passavant.

== History and architectural features ==
The oldest structure in Zelienople, the Passavant House now serves as a museum, library, and headquarters for the Zelienople Historical Society, which offers tours upon request. The interior features a large collection of furniture, clothing, personal and household items, particularly of the Passavant family, dating back to the early 1800s.

The building's name reflects the Passavant family, the most famous of whom was Rev. William A. Passavant (1821–1894), who was born in the house and became nationally known for his charitable works on behalf of the Lutheran community in the United States.

The simple 2 1/2-story, three-bay by two-bay, brick dwelling sits on a sandstone foundation. Built in 1808, a two-story frame addition was added to the rear circa 1820. A two-story bay window and porch were added in 1915.
