= Sen. Walter Lowrie House =

Historic house in Pennsylvania, United States

- U.S. National Register of Historic Places
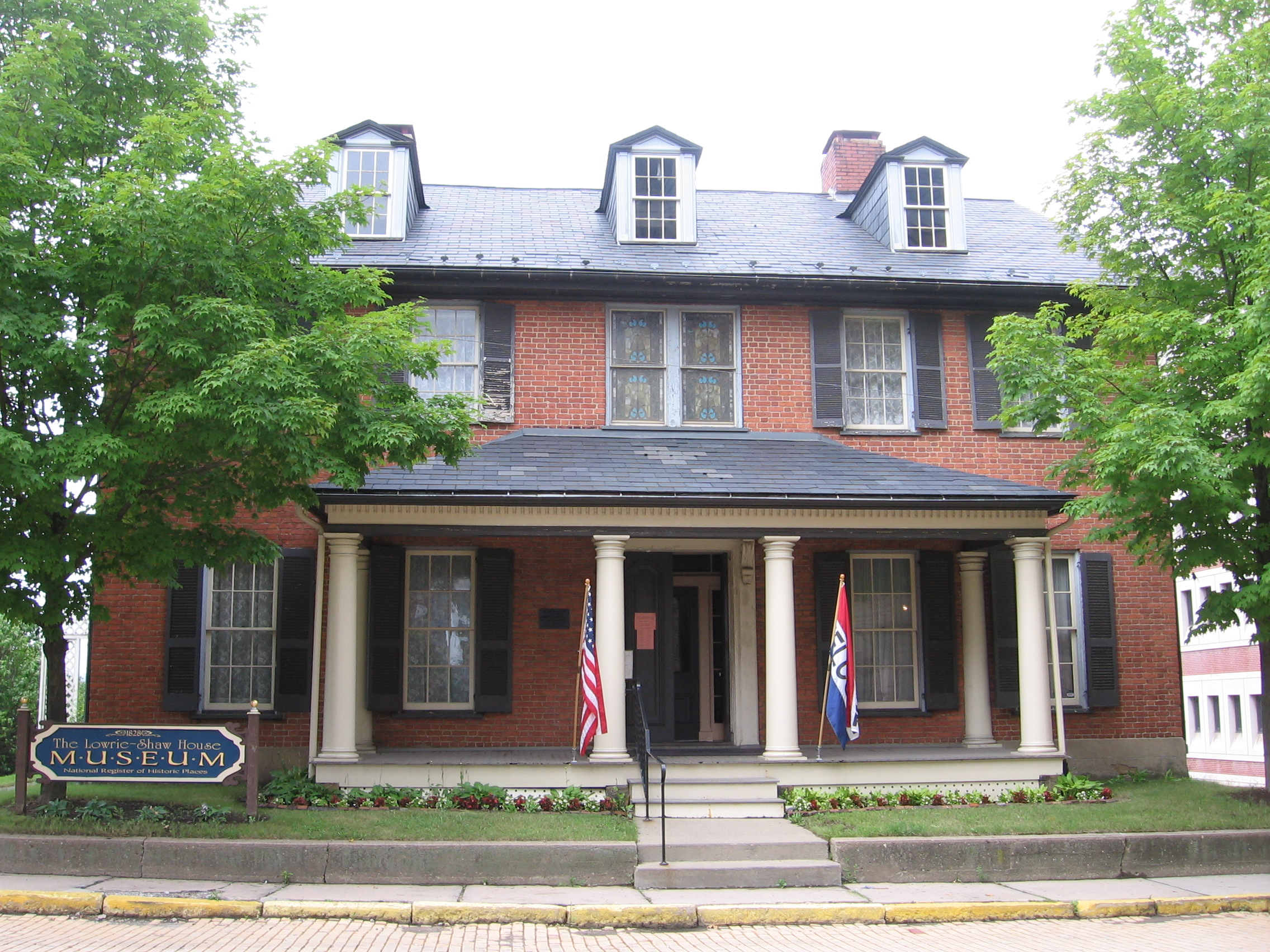
- Sen. Walter Lowrie House

- Location within Pennsylvania Location within the United States
- Location: W. Diamond and S. Jackson Sts., Butler, Pennsylvania
- Coordinates: 40°51′30″N 79°53′47″W
- Built: 1828
- NRHP reference No.: 79002177
- Added to NRHP: May 1, 1979

The Senator Walter Lowrie Shaw House is an historic home located in downtown Butler, Butler County, Pennsylvania, United States. Considered the last of its kind in the city of Butler, it is known in the area for being the home of Butler's only United States Senator, Walter Lowrie.

Situated behind the Butler County Courthouse, it houses the Butler County Historical Society's office, and is maintained as a museum by the Society.

It was listed on the National Register of Historic Places in 1979.

== History and architectural features ==
The last house of its kind in the city of Butler, it was built in 1828, and is situated behind the Butler County Courthouse. It is a two-and-one-half-story, brick dwelling on a cut stone foundation, and has a slate covered gable roof. The front section measures forty-eight feet by thirty-eight feet and has a two-story, shed-roofed rear wing. A front porch was added between 1870 and 1880.

=== Present day ===
The house is currently home to the Butler County Historical Society's office, and is maintained as a museum by the Society.
