= John Roebling House =

Historic home located at Saxonburg, Butler County, Pennsylvania

- John Roebling Shop
- U.S. National Register of Historic Places
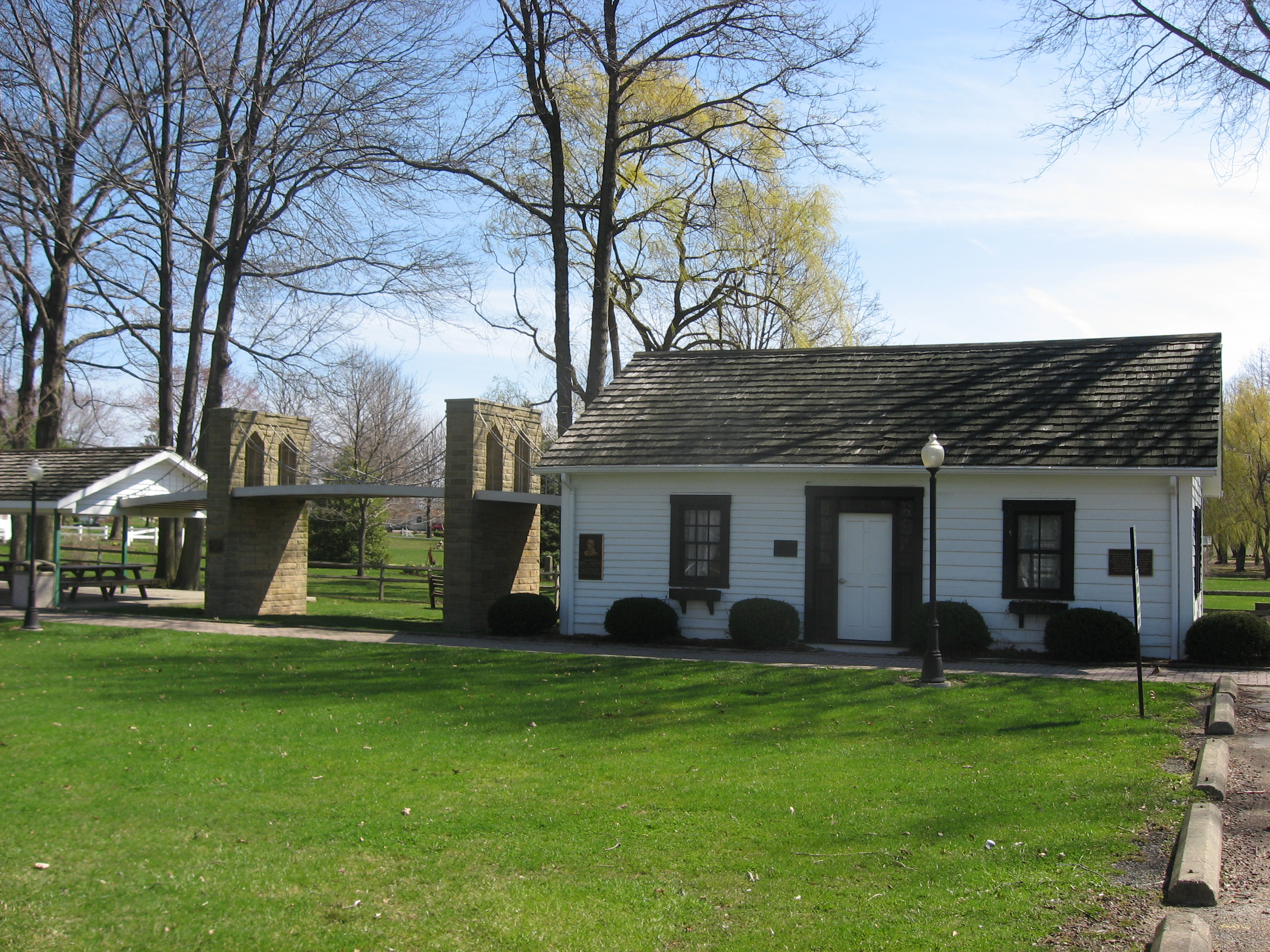
- Roebling Shop in April 2009

- Location within Pennsylvania Location within the United States
- Location: Roebling Park, along Rebecca Street, Saxonburg, Pennsylvania
- Coordinates: 40°45′3″N 79°48′39″W
- Area: 1.3 acres (0.53 ha)
- Built: 1832-1835, 1841
- NRHP reference No.: 76001610
- Added to NRHP: November 13, 1976

The John Roebling House is an historic home that is located in Saxonburg, Butler County, Pennsylvania, United States.

It was listed on the National Register of Historic Places in 1976.

== History and architectural features ==
Built between 1832 and 1835, this historic structure is a two-story, brick and frame dwelling that sits on a partially exposed basement. A two-story rear addition was built circa 1904. Included in the listing is the Roebling Shop, which was built in 1841. A one-story, gable-roofed, clapboard-covered, frame building, it was the shop of noted civil engineer John A. Roebling (1806-1869), who was also a founder of Saxonburg. Sometime after its listing, the shop was moved from its original location at the intersection of Rebecca and Main Streets, to Roebling Park, along Rebecca Street.
