= Wartburg (retirement community) =

Wartburg Mount Vernon Inc.
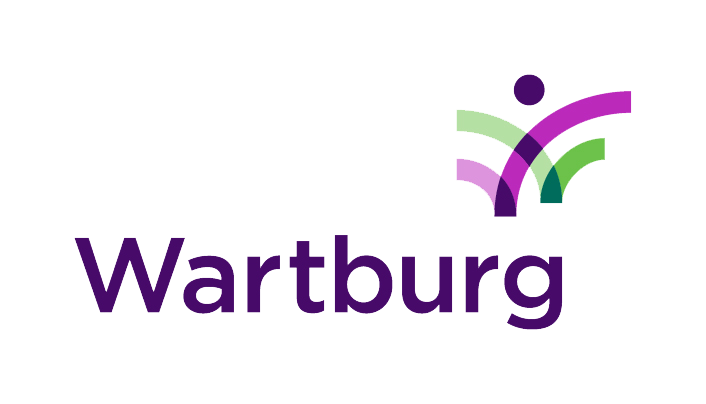

Location
- One Wartburg Place; Mount Vernon, New York 10552; United States

Information
- Denomination: Lutheran
- Established: 1866
- Founder: William Passavant
- President: David Gentner
- Campus size: 34 acres (14 ha)
- Website: www.wartburg.org

Wartburg Mount Vernon Inc. is a non-profit, Lutheran organization located in Mount Vernon, New York that provides a continuum of care to older adults through residential and community-based programs and services. Wartburg was founded in 1866 as an orphanage and farm school and began serving older adults in 1898. As the foster care system took hold in the mid-1900s, Wartburg gradually phased out the orphanage and by 1979, its focus was solely on serving the elderly.

== History ==
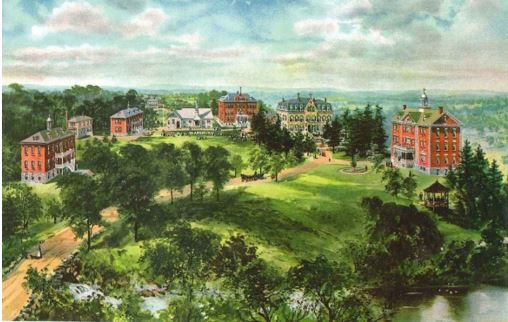
Wartburg historic lithograph of Wartburg Orphan's Farm School in Mt. Vernon, New York, turn of the century.

The Wartburg Orphans' Farm School was established in 1866 by a Lutheran minister, Reverend William Passavant, with an initial gift of $30,000 from New York sugar refiner Peter Moller. Originally, Moller had planned to use the funds to erect a lavish memorial for his son, whom he had lost in the American Civil War. However, Reverend Passavant, who had previously founded The Orphan's Home and Farm School in Zelienople, Pennsylvania, convinced Moller of the need for a similar orphanage in New York to help the great number of children left fatherless by the Civil War. Moller agreed and donated the $30,000 to help fund the new orphanage. With advisement from Reverend G.C. Holls, headmaster of the Zelienople orphanage and Sister Elizabeth, a nun affiliated with a similar orphanage in Rochester, Pennsylvania, Reverend Passavant searched for an appropriate property for the new orphanage. Ultimately, they settled on 125 acres (51 ha) of land in Mount Vernon, New York purchased from The Lutheran Committee for Charitable Concerns. On a visit to the property, Passavant was believed to comment that "This is something like the site of The Wartburg where Luther translated the New Testament," of which Pastor Holls, later hired as the first director of The Wartburg, replied with "Then we will call it The Wartburg." The Wartburg was originally incorporated under the name "Deaconess Institution of the State of New York." However, in 1884, a state charter was obtained, officially naming it "The Wartburg Orphan Farm School of the Evangelical Lutheran Church".

=== 1865–1899 ===
In 1865, the Rev. William A. Passavant, approached Peter Moller, about the need of caring for the orphans of soldiers killed in the Civil war and in the memory of his son who died in 1864, Moller made a substantial donation toward buying land and erecting the first building of what became Wartburg. Other wealthy German-Americans assisted, including John A. Roebling, designer of the Brooklyn Bridge. In 1866, The Wartburg Orphans' Farm School opened near Mount Vernon, New York. While open to children of any religious affiliation, it was closely associated with the Lutheran churches. The first director, or "housefather", was Rev. George C. Holls, who served for 19 years. Passavant called the school "Wartburg" because its high, wooded land reminded him of the castle near Eisenach in Germany, where Martin Luther found refuge in 1521-22 and where he began his translation of the Bible. The Rev. Gottlieb C. Berkemeier began his term of 36 years in 1885 as Wartburg's director, beginning four decades of rapid expansion, during which more than a dozen buildings were erected. In 1889, The Marie Louise Heins Memorial Home was completed, and Wartburg entered the field of care for the elderly.

=== 1900–1999 ===
Along with the addition of care for the elderly, Berkemeier introduced a "family system" whereby children were housed of a similar age and gender in one residence to create a family. The first of these cottages was the Kindergarten Building. The smaller, more familial housing arrangements provided house parents with the opportunity to nurture the individual talents and interests of the children. The Wartburg Boy's Band, formed in 1899, was open to any boy (and later to girls) between the ages of 8 and 15. Led by Professor Robert Steinmetz for 36 years, the Wartburg Boy's Band was recognized for their musical ability and performed in concerts throughout the Northeast and New England. In 1902, a fire destroyed the original Wartburg Chapel and later replaced in 1904 by a larger structure that accommodates 400 people.

The farmland on the north side of the campus provided the fruits, vegetables, and dairy products that were the core of the nutritional needs for the orphans and seniors at Warburg.

In 1922 the cornerstone was dedicated for the Jahn Memorial, which was built to provide a private residence for Wartburg's directors and their families. Jahn Memorial is located just to the west of Wartburg Chapel. By 1955, The Marie Louise Heins Home for the Aged had tripled in size, and two large wings were added to meet the demand for more housing.

In 1984 Wartburg ended its program of caring for orphans and at-risk children after 113 years. That same year, Lohman Village, a community of individual townhouses for older people who are still able to lead an active life and desire the security and assistance of Wartburg, was opened. In 1991, The Wartburg Foundation, Inc. was established with its Certificate of Incorporation charging the newly formed entity with the responsibility "to solicit, accept and receive monies, legacies, gifts, grants, contributions, subventions, endowments, and property of any kind, real or personal, and thereafter to hold, invest and reinvest the same", with the ultimate goal of supporting the work of The Wartburg Home through Foundation Board-approved grants.

=== 2000–2011 ===
In 2011, Wartburg was chosen to receive a $27.6 million grant to fund two new buildings on campus: the short term-rehab/adult day facility and 61 units of supportive housing. The short-term rehabilitation center will be designed around the "neighborhood" model. Adjacent to this building will be the new adult day care building. In 2015 Wartburg opened an Outpatient Therapy Clinic within its Rehabilitation Center of Excellence Building

=== 2021–present ===
Newsweek lists Wartburg 17th among senior care centers in New York state, based on "overall performance data, peer recommendations, and each facility's handling of COVID-19." In November, 2022 Wartburg was named by U.S. News and World Report as one of the best nursing homes in New York state. Wartburg began constructing a new 50,500 s/f Alzheimer's disease and Related Dementia Berkemeier Living Center at One Wartburg Place.
