= Butler, Pennsylvania =

City in Pennsylvania, US

- City
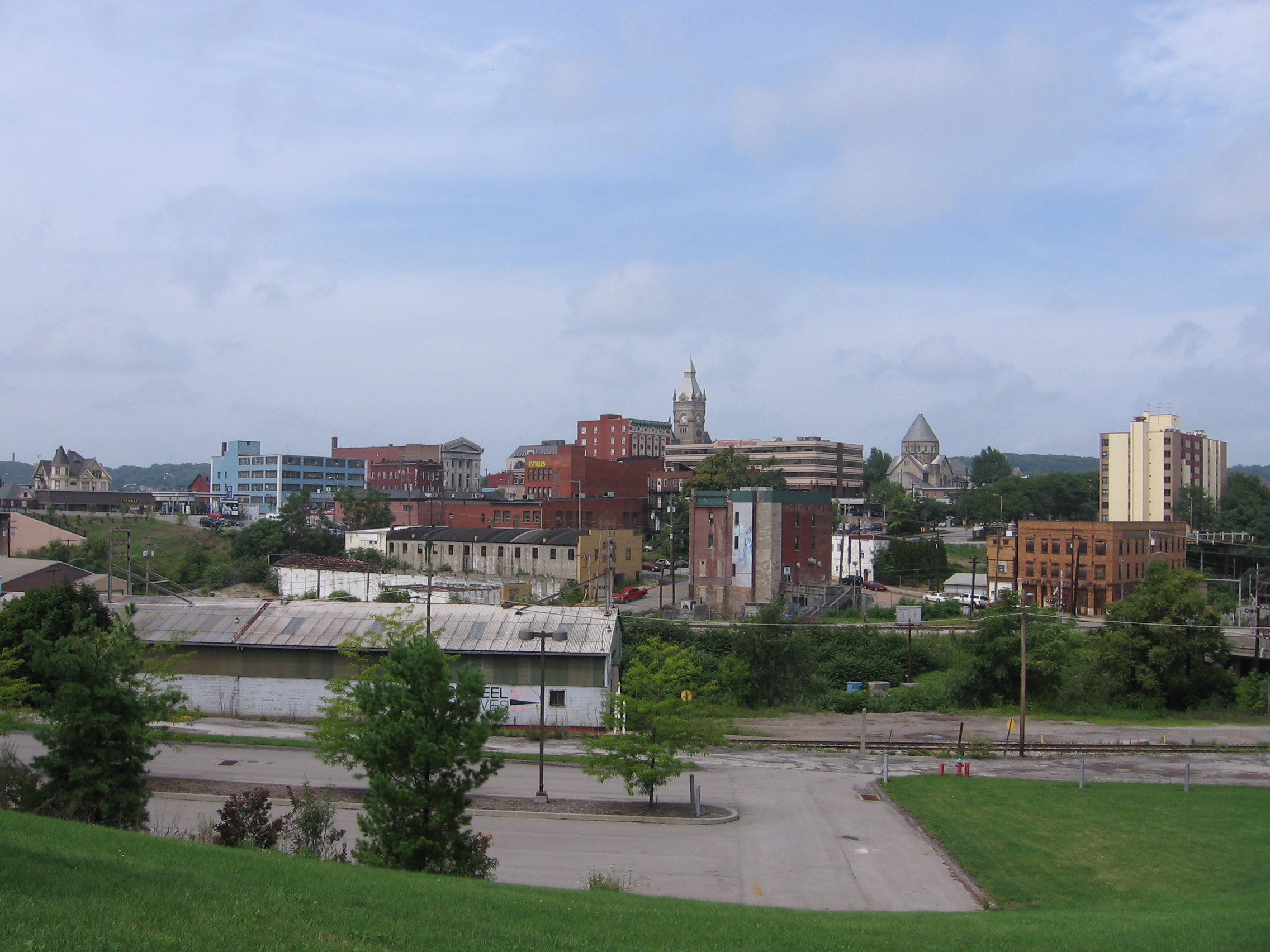
- View of Butler from the Southside neighborhood

- Flag Seal
- Interactive map of Butler, Pennsylvania
- Location within Pennsylvania Location within the United States
- Coordinates: 40°51′40″N 79°53′43″W
- Country: United States
- State: Pennsylvania
- County: Butler
- Settled: 1793
- Incorporated (borough): 1816
- Incorporated (city);: 1918

Government
  - Type: Mayor-Council
  - Mayor: Bob Dandoy

Area
  - Total: 2.72 sq mi (7.04 km^{2})
  - Land: 2.72 sq mi (7.04 km^{2})
  - Water: 0 sq mi (0.00 km^{2})

Population (2020)
  - Total: 13,502
  - Density: 4,966.2/sq mi (1,917.47/km^{2})
- Time zone: UTC−5 (Eastern (EST))
  - Summer (DST): UTC−4 (EDT)
- ZIP Codes: 16001–16003
- Area codes: 724, 878
- FIPS code: 42-10464
- Website: cityofbutler.org

Butler is a city in Butler County, Pennsylvania, United States, and its county seat. It is 35 miles (56 km) north of Pittsburgh and part of the Greater Pittsburgh region. As of the 2020 census, the population was 13,502.

Butler is named after Major General Richard Butler, who died in the 1791 Battle of the Wabash. Settled in 1803 by John and Samuel Cunningham, it became a borough in 1817 and a city in 1918. Initially populated by Irish and Scottish immigrants, Butler saw a large influx of German settlers in the early 19th century. It contributed to the Steel Belt manufacturing region as home to the Standard Steel Car Company, which produced early all-steel railcars, and the American Bantam Car Company, known for developing the original Willys Jeep.

The Butler Area Public Library, built in 1921, was Pennsylvania's last Carnegie library. The city also hosts the Butler Little Theatre, active since 1941, and notable sites such as the Butler County Courthouse and Butler Armory. Annual events include the Bantam Jeep Heritage Festival and the Butler Italian Festival. Though manufacturing jobs declined by the late 1970s, Butler has sought economic revitalization, with key employers including Cleveland-Cliffs, Butler Area School District, and VA Butler Healthcare.

== History ==
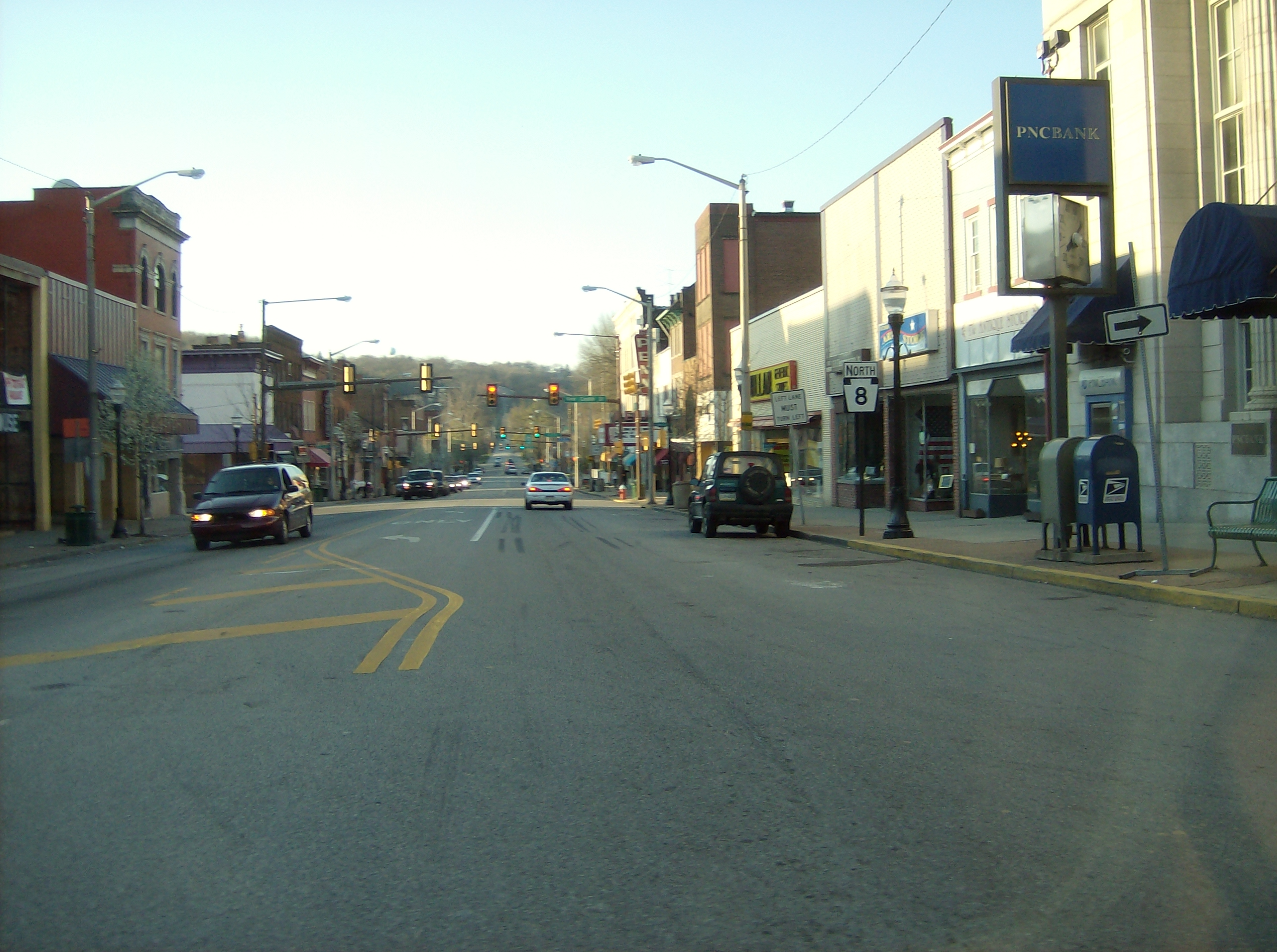
Downtown Butler

Butler was named for Maj. Gen. Richard Butler, who fell at the Battle of the Wabash, also known as St. Clair's Defeat, in western Ohio in 1791.

In 1803, John and Samuel Cunningham became the first settlers in the village of Butler. After settling in Butler, the two brothers laid out the community by drawing up plots of land for more incoming settlers. By 1817, the community was incorporated into a borough. The first settlers were of Irish or Scottish descent and were driving westward from Connecticut. In 1802, the German immigrants began arriving, with Detmar Basse settling in Jackson Township in 1802 and founding Zelienople the following year. After George Rapp arrived in 1805 and founded Harmony, larger numbers of settlers followed. John A. Roebling settled Saxonburg in 1832, by which time most of the county was filled with German settlers.

Butler was incorporated into a city in 1918.

The first Butler library originated in 1894 with the Literary Society of Butler in what is now known as the Little Red Schoolhouse. The Butler Area Public Library, built in 1921, was the last Carnegie library to be built in Pennsylvania. In the intervening 27, years the library was independently operated. From 1921 to 1941, the library quadrupled the number of patrons served.

=== Rail and automobile ===
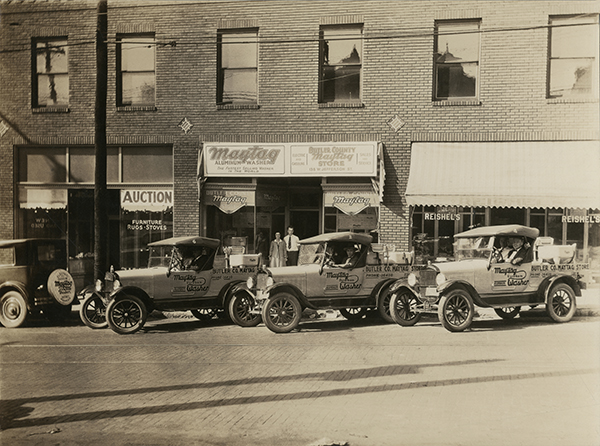
Edna & Floyd Cramer at their Maytag Store in Butler, Pennsylvania 1920s

In the early 1900s, Butler was a "Steel Belt" manufacturing and industrial area. It remains home to a Cleveland Cliffs Butler Works, formerly AK Steel Butler Works. In 1902, the Standard Steel Car Company opened one of its largest railcar manufacturing facilities in Butler, where it manufactured some of the first all-steel rail cars. Standard Steel Car Company merged with Pullman Palace Car Company in 1934, creating Pullman-Standard, a monopoly that was eventually broken by the federal government.

About 2,500 workers produced 60 steel-bed railroad cars per day in 1902. Eastern European immigrants were lured to the area in the early 20th century with the promise of reliable jobs, which offered company housing and a company store. The company constructed a baseball park which was the home of a New York Yankees farm team. The steel workers of Butler made artillery and naval shells during World War II.

The Pullman-Standard plant closed in 1982, but was purchased in 1984 by Trinity Industries. Trinity Industries left the factory in 1993, and the factory was completely demolished in 2005. The site is now occupied by a vacant strip mall, as well as the Butler Transit Authority inter-modal facility. In 2011 the BTA moved a covered hopper rail-car, built in 1974, to the bus terminal in recognition of the former Pullman-Standard plant.

The American Austin Car Company (1929–1941) was headquartered in the area. Later the firm changed its name to American Bantam Car Company. Bantam was an early producer of small fuel-efficient vehicles through the 1930s. In 1940, lead engineer Karl Probst led Bantam design team to create what later was termed the iconic WWII Jeep. Sizeable military contracts eventually went to Willys and Ford, as the Bantam factory had floundered. Today, a controversial monument stands near the courthouse commemorating Bantam's "creation of the Jeep".

Butler is home to one of the early Ford dealerships, established in 1918 and still extant.

At one point, the Rainbow Rubber Company, in the late 1930s, made "Rubrtoy" replicas of Oldsmobiles along with many other rubber toys.

In the 1950s, Butler became one of the first cities to install bells at crosswalks, a common practice today. Pedestrians could cross in either direction.

The city was linked to Pittsburgh via Mars, Pennsylvania, in 1907 by the Pittsburgh and Butler Street Railway, and to Evans City in 1908 by the Pittsburgh, Harmony, Butler and New Castle Railway, both interurban trolley lines. The Mars route closed in April 1931, followed by the Evans City line on August 15, 1931, with the trolleys replaced by buses.

=== 1970s to present ===
Like most of the region, by the end of the 1970s, the local economy changed dramatically. Manufacturing virtually ended and well-paying jobs became scarce.

On July 13, 2024, during a 2024 presidential campaign rally at the Butler Farm Show grounds near Butler, Donald Trump was wounded in his right ear from an attempted assassination, during which one audience member was killed and two others severely injured in the gunfire. Thomas Matthew Crooks, the perpetrator, was promptly killed by a Secret Service Counter Assault Team sniper. Trump was swiftly transported to Butler Memorial Hospital and treated there, before being flown out of Pittsburgh International Airport. The incident occurred outside of the Butler city jurisdiction. Nonetheless, Mayor of Butler Bob Dandoy stated that a lot of attention was focused on the city.

== Geography ==
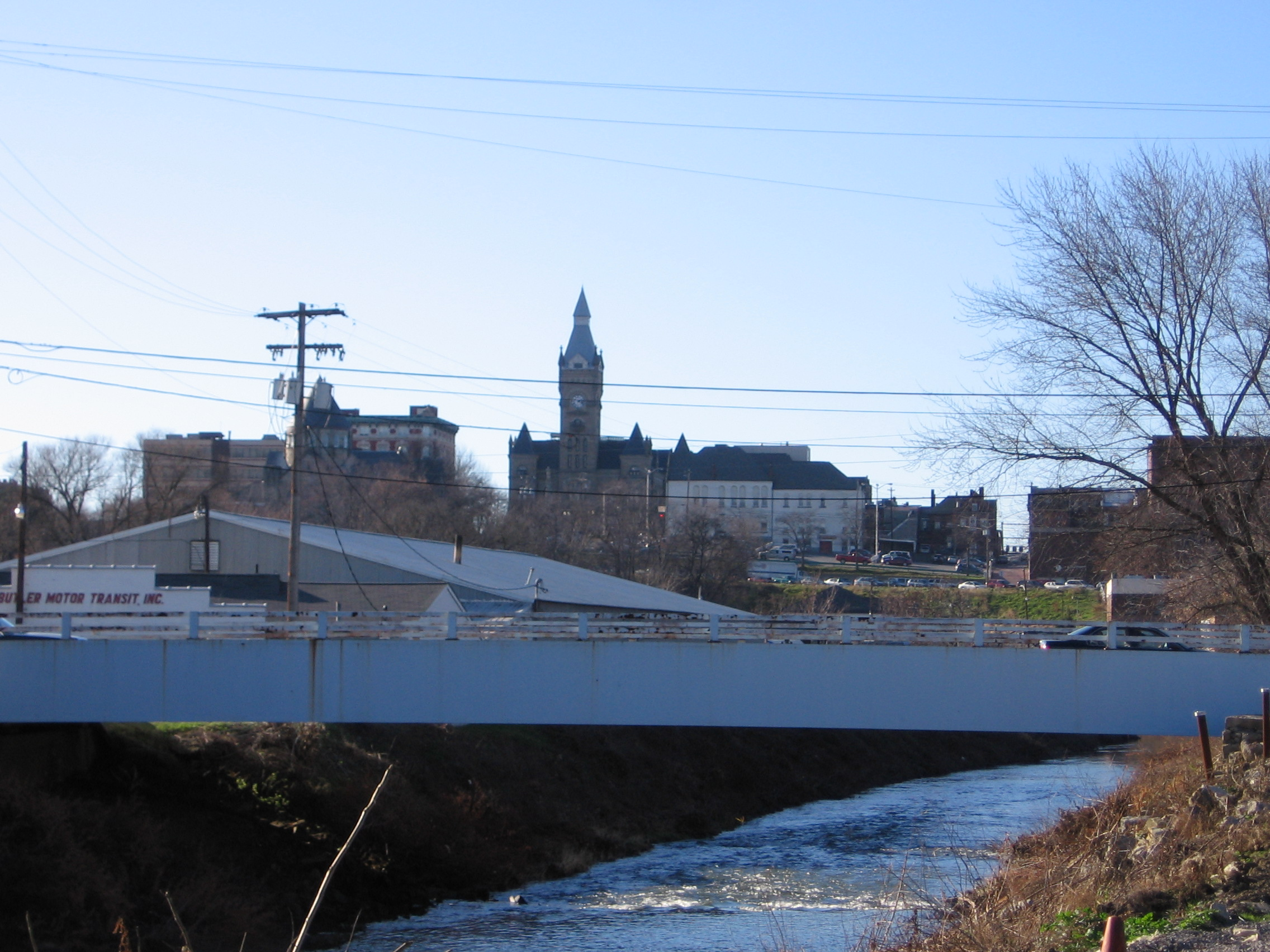
Connoquenessing Creek flows through Butler, Pennsylvania.

According to the United States Census Bureau, the city has a total area of 2.7 square miles (7.0 km^{2}), all land.

Connoquenessing Creek is the only waterway to pass through the city. In 2000, a scientific study was conducted to determine the health of the creek. Researchers discovered that only the Mississippi River received more toxic materials than the Connoquenessing, making the small river the second most polluted waterway in the United States. At the time, the Armco Inc. steel facility in Butler ranked first nationally for the amount of pollutant discharges. However, by 2010, due to reduced industry and clean up efforts, the creek's health has significantly recovered and has become popular for water-sport activities.

=== Neighborhoods ===
The city of Butler has six labeled neighborhoods:

- Institute Hill
- The Island
- North Butler
- South Hills
- South Side
- West End

=== Climate ===
Climate data for Butler, Pennsylvania (2mi SW) (1991–2020 normals, extremes 1967–present)
Month	Jan	Feb	Mar	Apr	May	Jun	Jul	Aug	Sep	Oct	Nov	Dec	Year
Record high °F (°C)	69 (21)	75 (24)	84 (29)	90 (32)	91 (33)	97 (36)	102 (39)	100 (38)	94 (34)	88 (31)	79 (26)	74 (23)	102 (39)
Mean daily maximum °F (°C)	34.3 (1.3)	37.4 (3.0)	46.4 (8.0)	60.0 (15.6)	70.0 (21.1)	77.9 (25.5)	81.7 (27.6)	80.7 (27.1)	74.3 (23.5)	61.9 (16.6)	49.7 (9.8)	39.1 (3.9)	59.4 (15.2)
Daily mean °F (°C)	25.8 (−3.4)	27.8 (−2.3)	35.8 (2.1)	47.3 (8.5)	57.4 (14.1)	66.1 (18.9)	70.0 (21.1)	68.8 (20.4)	61.9 (16.6)	50.4 (10.2)	39.7 (4.3)	31.2 (−0.4)	48.5 (9.2)
Mean daily minimum °F (°C)	17.3 (−8.2)	18.3 (−7.6)	25.2 (−3.8)	34.6 (1.4)	44.8 (7.1)	54.3 (12.4)	58.2 (14.6)	56.8 (13.8)	49.6 (9.8)	38.9 (3.8)	29.7 (−1.3)	23.2 (−4.9)	37.6 (3.1)
Record low °F (°C)	−20 (−29)	−19 (−28)	−10 (−23)	9 (−13)	22 (−6)	31 (−1)	34 (1)	32 (0)	28 (−2)	17 (−8)	0 (−18)	−14 (−26)	−20 (−29)
Average precipitation inches (mm)	3.36 (85)	2.66 (68)	3.28 (83)	3.50 (89)	3.80 (97)	4.33 (110)	4.16 (106)	4.02 (102)	4.09 (104)	3.30 (84)	3.34 (85)	3.37 (86)	43.21 (1,098)
Average snowfall inches (cm)	11.3 (29)	9.7 (25)	5.3 (13)	0.6 (1.5)	0.0 (0.0)	0.0 (0.0)	0.0 (0.0)	0.0 (0.0)	0.0 (0.0)	0.1 (0.25)	1.1 (2.8)	6.8 (17)	34.9 (89)
Average precipitation days (≥ 0.01 in)	18.1	14.8	13.6	14.6	15.1	13.1	12.3	11.3	10.9	13.3	14.1	16.4	167.6
Average snowy days (≥ 0.1 in)	10.7	7.9	5.2	1.2	0.0	0.0	0.0	0.0	0.0	0.0	1.5	6.5	33.0
Source: NOAA

== Demographics ==
Historical population
Census	Pop.	Note	%±
1820	225		—
1830	580		157.8%
1840	861		48.4%
1850	1,148		33.3%
1860	1,399		21.9%
1870	1,935		38.3%
1880	3,163		63.5%
1890	8,734		176.1%
1900	10,853		24.3%
1910	20,728		91.0%
1920	23,778		14.7%
1930	23,568		−0.9%
1940	24,477		3.9%
1950	23,482		−4.1%
1960	20,975		−10.7%
1970	18,691		−10.9%
1980	17,026		−8.9%
1990	15,714		−7.7%
2000	15,121		−3.8%
2010	13,757		−9.0%
2020	13,502		−1.9%
U.S. Decennial Census

=== 2020 census ===
As of the 2020 census, Butler had a population of 13,502. The median age was 37.5 years. 21.5% of residents were under the age of 18 and 14.4% of residents were 65 years of age or older. For every 100 females there were 98.8 males, and for every 100 females age 18 and over there were 97.8 males age 18 and over.

100.0% of residents lived in urban areas, while 0.0% lived in rural areas.

There were 6,174 households in Butler, of which 24.3% had children under the age of 18 living in them. Of all households, 26.0% were married-couple households, 27.3% were households with a male householder and no spouse or partner present, and 36.4% were households with a female householder and no spouse or partner present. About 43.2% of all households were made up of individuals and 14.6% had someone living alone who was 65 years of age or older.

There were 7,071 housing units, of which 12.7% were vacant. The homeowner vacancy rate was 3.4% and the rental vacancy rate was 9.0%.

Racial composition as of the 2020 census
Race	Number	Percent
White	11,787	87.3%
Black or African American	470	3.5%
American Indian and Alaska Native	56	0.4%
Asian	78	0.6%
Native Hawaiian and Other Pacific Islander	11	0.1%
Some other race	166	1.2%
Two or more races	934	6.9%
Hispanic or Latino (of any race)	459	3.4%

=== 2000 census ===
As of the 2000 census, there were 15,121 people, 6,740 households, and 3,626 families residing in the city. The population density was 5,611.3 inhabitants per square mile (2,166.5/km^{2}). There were 7,402 housing units at an average density of 2,746.8 per square mile (1,060.5/km^{2}). The racial makeup of the city was 93.6% White, 2.7% African American, 0.2% Native American, 0.5% Asian, 0.52% from other races, and 1.14% from two or more races. Hispanic or Latino of any race were 4.88% of the population.

There were 6,740 households, out of which 26.8% had children under the age of 18 living with them, 35.0% were married couples living together, 14.4% had a female householder with no husband present, and 46.2% were non-families. 40.7% of all households were made up of individuals, and 16.3% had someone living alone who was 65 years of age or older. The average household size was 2.18 and the average family size was 2.96.

In the city, the population was spread out, with 23.7% under the age of 18, 9.7% from 18 to 24, 30.3% from 25 to 44, 20.2% from 45 to 64, and 16.1% who were 65 years of age or older. The median age was 36 years. For every 100 females, there were 88.1 males. For every 100 females age 18 and over, there were 83.9 males.

The median income for a household in the city was $25,154, and the median income for a family was $35,893. Males had a median income of $30,607 versus $20,950 for females. The per capita income for the city was $16,457. About 14.7% of families and 19.1% of the population were below the poverty line, including 26.8% of those under age 18 and 14.5% of those age 65 or over.

== Economy ==
Major employers:

- Walmart
- Cleveland-Cliffs Butler Works (formerly AK Steel)
- Armstrong Group of Companies
- Penn United Technologies
- VA Butler Healthcare
- Butler Area School District
- Butler County Community College
- WVU Health System (formerly Independence Health System and Butler Health System)

== Arts and culture ==
The Butler County Symphony Orchestra (BCSO), is Butler County's largest performing arts non-profit. Founded in 1948 as the Butler Orchestral Association, the BCSO has been in continuous operations since its first concert in April 1950. Edward Roncone served as the first Music Director and Conductor, and the inaugural performance also served as the Sesquicentennial celebration of Butler County. The BCSO currently sponsors six subscription concerts, a Chamber Music Series, and a Summer Concert Series, making them operate as a year-round performing arts organization.

The Butler Little Theatre has been running productions continuously since 1941. The Musical Theater Guild produces an annual musical production. In 2012, Hobnob Theatre Company began producing several plays, including an annual production of Charles Dickens' A Christmas Carol and Shakespeare in the Park productions at Preston Park and other Butler county parks.

The Maridon Museum is the only museum in the Western Pennsylvania region with a specific focus on Chinese and Japanese art and culture.

The Little Red School House is a former one-room schoolhouse that taught students from 1839 to 1874. Throughout its history, it has been a post office, library and Red Cross headquarters. It became a museum in 1966 and is run by the Butler County Historical Society.

Butler is home to the Butler County Symphony Association, which performs at the Butler Intermediate High School auditorium.

The city features artist groups including the Associated Artists of Butler County and the Butler Arts Council, which host galleries and live events at the Art Center, located on Main Street.

Stewart O'Nan's prizewinning 1994 novel Snow Angels is set in Butler, with the protagonist being a local high school student. However, the 2007 film adaption, shot in Canada, removes all references to Butler.

Stephen King's 2002 novel From A Buick 8 takes place in the area.

The city was the setting for several scenes in the 2015 novel trilogy Benjamin's Field by local author J. J. Knights.

=== Events ===
The Butler Road Race, a 5-mile and 2-mile race held each summer in June, raises scholarship funding for local students.

The Butler Italian Festival is an annual street fair that features ethnic foods, live music and events. The festival's organizer canceled the regular event in 2024, so a similar event, "Taste of Italy," was put on by downtown businesses instead.

The Bantam Jeep Heritage Festival, the Largest Jeep Festival in the US, is held annually in June with off-road trails, a Jeep Playground obstacle course, and the "original" Jeep Invasion street party.

=== Historical sites ===
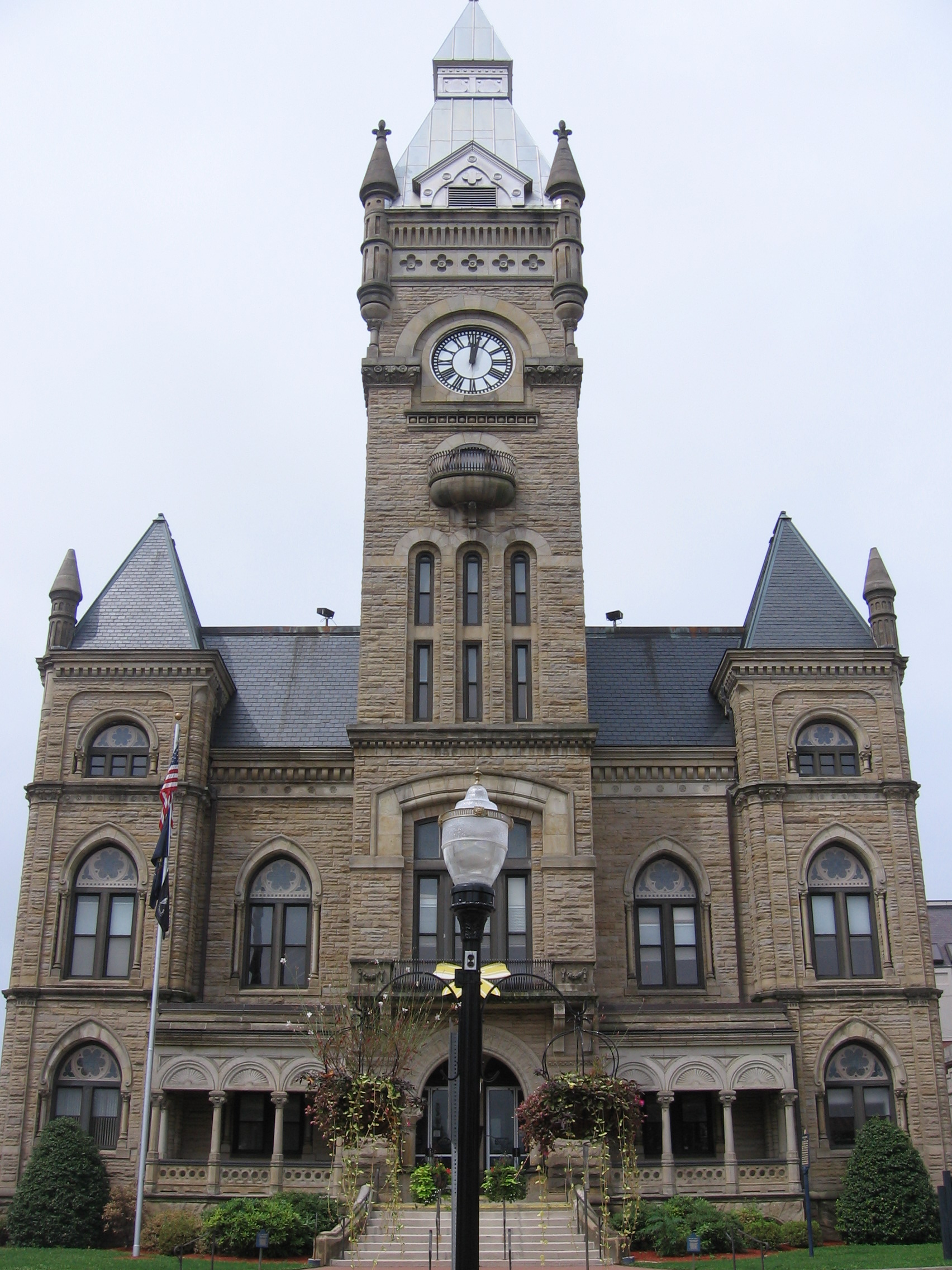
Butler County Courthouse

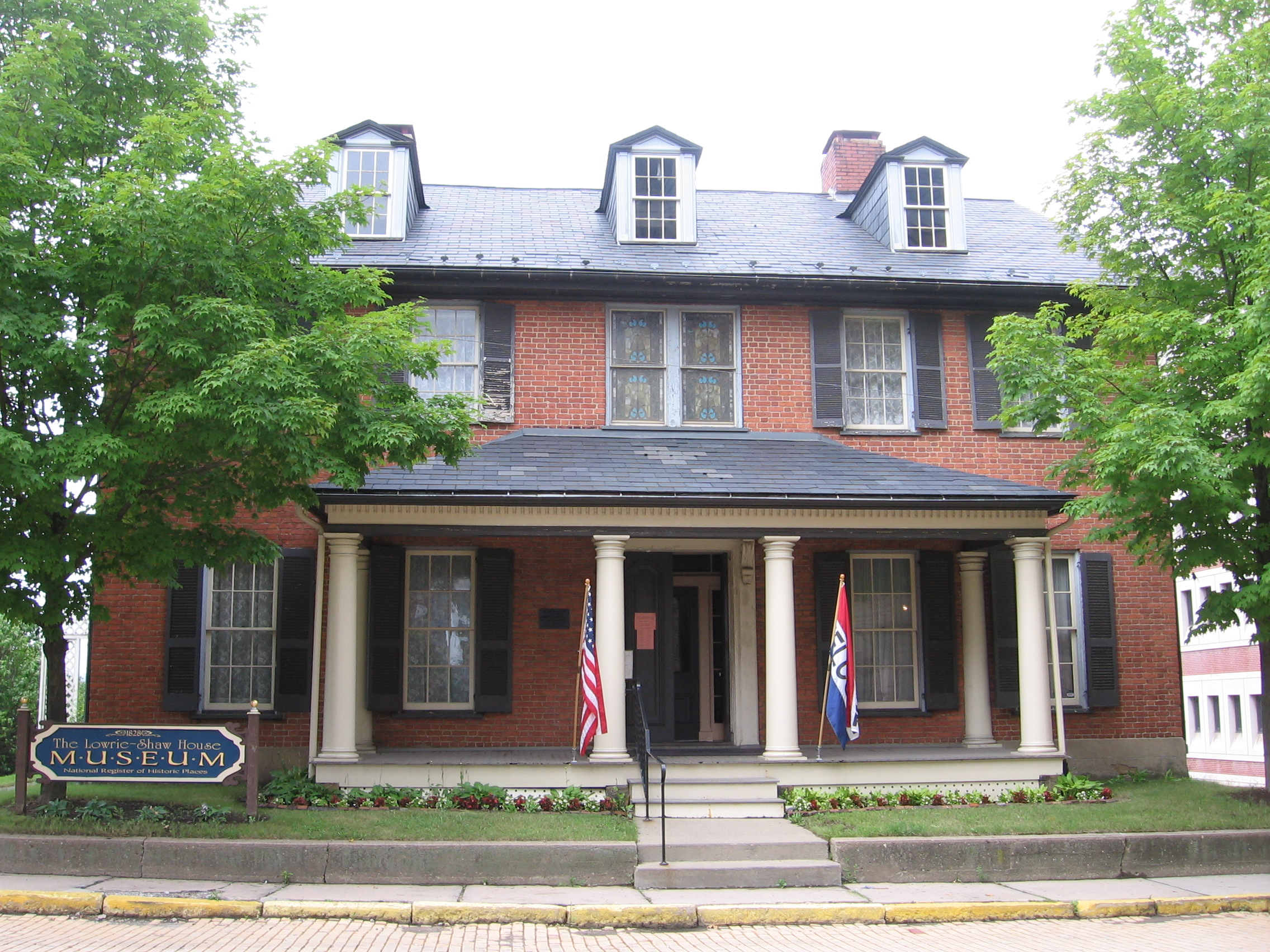
Senator Walter Lowrie House

The following structures are listed in the National Register of Historic Places

- The Butler Armory is a National Guard armory located on Washington Street. Built in 1922, it was designed by architect Joseph F. Kuntz with W.G. Wilkins, Co. and expanded in 1930.
- The Butler County Courthouse is a government and judicial building located in the heart of the city. The plaza across the street, Diamond Park, displays various war memorials.
- The Butler County National Bank, also known as the Lafayette Building and Butler Branch Mellon Bank, is considered the first "skyscraper" in Butler. It was built in 1902–1903, and is a six-story, five bay by five bay, brick and stone building in the French Renaissance Revival style. A two-story addition was built in 1929. The building housed Butler's post office from 1903 to 1913. The building was rehabilitated into an apartment building in 1992–1993.
- The Butler Historic District is a national historic district which includes 128 contributing buildings, 1 contributing site, and 4 contributing objects in the central business district of Butler. It includes primarily commercial and institutional buildings, with some residential buildings, built between about 1828 and 1952 in a number of popular architectural styles including Late Victorian. Located in the district and listed separately are the Butler County Courthouse, the Butler County National Bank, and the Sen. Walter Lowrie House.
- The Senator Walter Lowrie House was the home of United States Senator Walter Lowrie, built in 1828, and is the headquarters of the Butler County Historical Society.
- Elm Court, often referred to as Phillips Mansion, is a historic Tudor-Gothic mansion designed by architect Benno Janssen and built in 1929–1930 for Benjamin D. Phillips, son of T. W. Phillips, founder of T.W. Phillips Gas & Oil Co. Tucked away and hidden from view, it resides in the northeast corner of the city and is privately owned by one of the Koch Brothers.

== Sports ==
- Butler BlueSox, active from 2006 to present.
- Michelle Krill Field at Historic Pullman Park (formerly known as Pullman Park until 2014), built in 1934, was used for minor league baseball for twenty years until the Pittsburgh Pirates farm team left in 1951. During its professional baseball days, MLP players who came through included Lou Gehrig, Whitey Ford, and Joe DiMaggio, who played for a farm team of the New York Yankees. Revamped in 2008, the stadium is home of the Butler BlueSox.

== Parks and recreation ==
- Doughboy Park, primarily a memorial dedicated to those who died in World War I.
- Butler Memorial Park, once featured a community pool, but it has remained closed since the late 2000s.
- Father Marinaro Park, features a skateboard park.
- Ritts Park, a small park in the northernmost portion of the city with various courts.
- Rotary Park, a curved park near the Pullman baseball park.
- Emily Brittain Elementary School Park, a local school playground.

== Education ==
- Butler Area School District
  - Broad Street Elementary School is in the Butler City limits. It closed in 2015. In 2017 Summit Township Elementary School used the Broad Street facility on a temporary basis. However, in 2021 the board of trustees voted to begin using Broad Street as a school again.
  - Emily Brittain Elementary School is in the Butler City limits
  - Center Avenue School in Butler City is a K–12 alternative school for students who are disabled; it was a traditional elementary school prior to 2015.
  - Butler Intermediate High School and Butler Area High School are in adjacent Butler Township

Other facilities:

- Butler County Area Vocational-Technical School
- Butler Catholic School
- Butler County Community College (BC3)

Additionally, the school district once operated Butler Area Junior High School, later Butler Middle School, which closed in 2022, in Butler City.

== Media ==
- The Butler Eagle, daily newspaper
- WBUT, country music AM radio
- WISR, news, talk, and sports AM radio
- WLER, rock music FM radio
- Butler Radio Network, news website
- Armstrong Neighborhood Channel, a community TV and internet channel
- Golden Tornado Television, channel 204, the school district's channel that features school news, sports, events and student projects

== Transportation ==
=== Airports ===
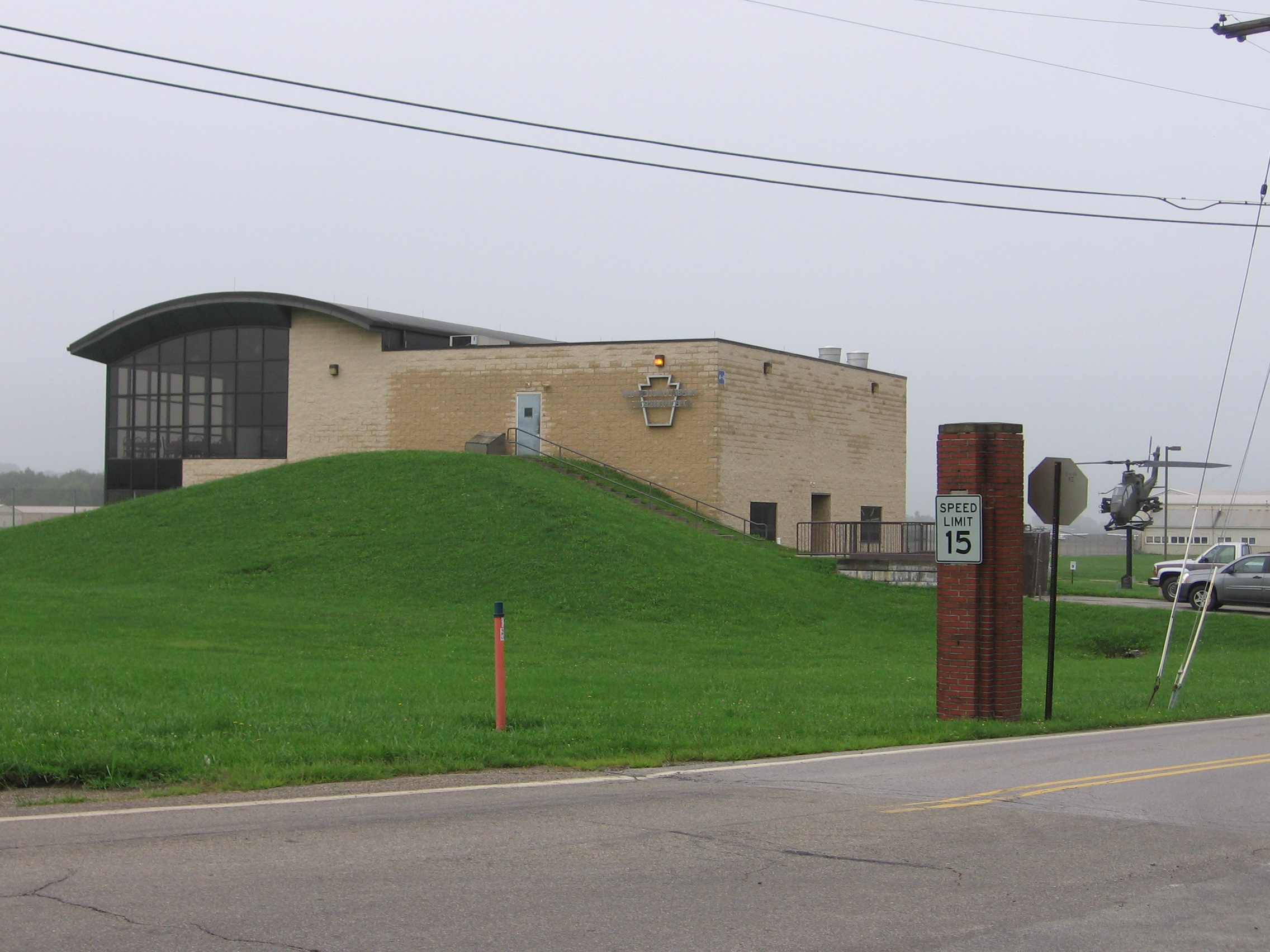
Butler County Airport terminal building

There are two airports located outside the city. Butler County Airport, in Penn Township, is used for general aviation and may accommodate large aircraft such as corporate jets. Butler Farm Show Airport, in Connoquenessing Township, is used by pilots with smaller, private aircraft.

=== Mass transit ===
Butler is served by the Butler Transit Authority, which operates local bus routes and a commuter service to Pittsburgh.

=== Railroads ===
Two railroads offer freight service in Butler. The Canadian National Railway-owned Bessemer and Lake Erie Railroad main line passes through the city, while the Buffalo and Pittsburgh Railroad provides regional service in the area. The B&P has a large locomotive shop just outside the city limits.

=== Roads ===
Five major highways run through or near the city, providing links to other areas throughout Western Pennsylvania. The south terminus of Pennsylvania Route 38 is just north of the city at U.S. Route 422. Route 422 skirts the city, to the north, on the Butler Bypass. PA 68 and PA 356 go straight through downtown, where they intersect with PA 8 (Butler's Main Street).

== Politics ==
In 2024, The New York Times characterized the Butler area as being politically conservative. That year, Mayor Bob Dandoy, a Democrat, stated that the city limits has a higher concentration of non-Republicans compared to the surrounding county. According to Dandoy, "President Trump enjoys a lot of support here."

Despite this support, in 2024, an attempted assassination of then-former president Donald Trump occurred at a rally near the town. The assassin, perched just outside the security perimeter, was shot and killed by a Secret Service sniper. Even though the event took place outside of city limits in Butler Township, the City of Butler issued a statement expressing sympathy for the death of Corey Comperatore, a firefighter caught in the line of fire, and for the attempt on Trump's life.

== Notable people ==
=== Sports ===
Major League Baseball:

- Matt Clement (born 1974), former MLB pitcher, All-Star, member of 2007 World Series champion Boston Red Sox
- Milt Graff (1930–2005), former MLB second baseman for the Kansas City Athletics (1957–1958)
- Khalil Greene (born 1979), former MLB player, San Diego Padres (2003–2008) and the St. Louis Cardinals (2009)
- Don Kelly (born 1980), former MLB utility player for multiple teams, currently the manager for the Pittsburgh Pirates
- William Riddle "Doc" Marshall (1875–1959), MLB catcher (1900s)
- Jerry Meals (born 1961), current MLB umpire
- John Stuper (born 1957), former MLB pitcher for the St. Louis Cardinals (1982–1985) and Cincinnati Reds (1985) and current coach of the Yale Bulldogs
- Ed Vargo (1928–2008), MLB umpire (1960s–1980s)

National Football League:

- Rich Bartlewski (born 1967), former NFL tight end for the Los Angeles Raiders (1990) and Atlanta Falcons (1991)
- Tom Brown (1921–2013), former NFL tight end for the Pittsburgh Steelers (1942)
- Terry Hanratty (born 1948), All-American and Sammy Baugh Trophy winning quarterback (1967) for Notre Dame
- Mike Koken (1909–1962), professional football player, for the Chicago Cardinals
- Scott Milanovich (born 1973), former NFL, NFL Europe, XFL, AFL, and CFL quarterback. Coached multiple CFL teams and was the head coach for the Edmonton Eskimos
- Paul Posluszny (born 1984), two-time All-American linebacker for Penn State University. Former NFL linebacker for the Buffalo Bills (2007–2010) and the Jacksonville Jaguars (2011–2017).
- Bill Saul (1940–2006), former NFL linebacker for multiple teams (1962–1970). Older brother of Rich and Ron.
- Rich Saul (1948–2012), former NFL center lineman for the Los Angeles Rams (1970–1981). Six-time Pro Bowler.
- Ron Saul (1948–2021), former NFL guard lineman for the Houston Oilers (1970–1975) and Washington Redskins (1976–1981). Younger brother of Bill, twin brother of Rich.
- Paul Uram (1926–2017), former NFL flexibility and kicking coach for the Pittsburgh Steelers (1973–1981).

Sports, other:

- Jake Hildebrand (born 1993), ECHL hockey player for the Kalamazoo Wings
- Harry Holiday (1923–1999), world record-setting swimmer and Armco CEO
- Brian Minto (born 1975), former heavyweight boxer (2002–2016)
- John Minton (1948–1995), former professional wrestler known by the name Big John Studd.
- Eric Namesnik (1970–2006), two-time silver medalist Olympic swimmer for men's 400-meter individual relay (1992 & 1996)
- David Pichler (born 1968), Olympic diver (1996 & 2000), dive team captain in 2000, did not place
- Meghan Schnur (born 1985), is an NSCAA All-American for University of Connecticut (2007) and an American soccer midfielder
- Alex Ziegler, player for the Savannah Bananas

=== Film, stage and television ===
- Chester Aaron (1932–2019), author with over two dozen publications
- Marc Blucas (born 1972), actor, best known by his portrayal of Riley Finn in Buffy the Vampire Slayer
- Joan Chandler (1923–1979), actress, best known for her roles in Alfred Hitchcock's Rope (1948) with James Stewart and Humoresque (1946)
- Josie Carey (1930–2004), the host of The Children's Corner on WQED in Pittsburgh.
- Barbara Feldon (born 1933), actress and model, best known as Agent 99 of the TV series Get Smart
- Grace Gealey (born 1984), actress, portrayed 'Anika' on the Fox series Empire
- Fred McCarren (1951–2006), actor, best known for his roles in Amanda's (1983) and Hill Street Blues (1984).
- Michele Pawk (born 1961), actress (2003, Best Performance by a Featured Actress in a Play, Hollywood Arms)

=== Music ===
- About a Mile, a Christian rock band
- Jim Anderson (born 1951), sound engineer and producer
- Glenn Crytzer (born 1980), band leader and composer
- Bret Michaels (born 1963), lead singer of the rock band Poison
- Jim Pugh (born 1950), jazz trombonist and composer.
- William Purvis (born 1948), French horn player, conductor and Musical Instruments Director at Yale University

=== Public office and military ===
- Gibson E. Armstrong (born 1943), former Republican PA State Representative
- Judge William G. Bassler (born 1938), former United States district judge of the United States District Court for the District of New Jersey (1991–2006)
- Brian Ellis (born 1969), former Republican PA State Representative for the 11th House district (2005–2019)
- Admiral Jonathan W. Greenert (born 1953), former Chief of Naval Operations for the U.S. Navy (2011–2015). Highly decorated and awarded.
- Mike Kelly (born 1948), local businessman and representative for Pennsylvania's 16th congressional district.
- Donald Oesterling (1927–2013), former Democratic PA State Senator for the 21st district from 1965 to 1972.
- William J. Perry (born 1927), Secretary of Defense under Bill Clinton (1994–1997).
- Rick Santorum (born 1958), former Republican U.S. Senator from PA (1995–2007).
- Tim Shaffer (1945–2022), Pennsylvania state senator

=== Technology ===
- Jay Last (1929–2021), physicist, silicon pioneer
- Earl L. Warrick (1911–2002), chemist, inventor of Silly Putty and silicone rubber
- Carl Yankowski (1948–2023), businessman and former CEO of Palm, Inc. and Ambient Devices.

=== Other ===
- Daniel D'Aniello (born 1946), billionaire businessman
- Harold Dodds (1889–1980), president of Princeton University (1933–1957)
- Michele McDonald (1952–2020), Miss USA 1971, semi-finalist of Miss Universe 1971
- Samuel Hall Young (1847–1927), a prominent Alaska Presbyterian missionary

== See also ==
- Butler Township, Butler County, Pennsylvania
- Butler County, Pennsylvania
- National Register of Historic Places listings in Butler County
