= Butler County Courthouse (Pennsylvania) =

- U.S. National Register of Historic Places
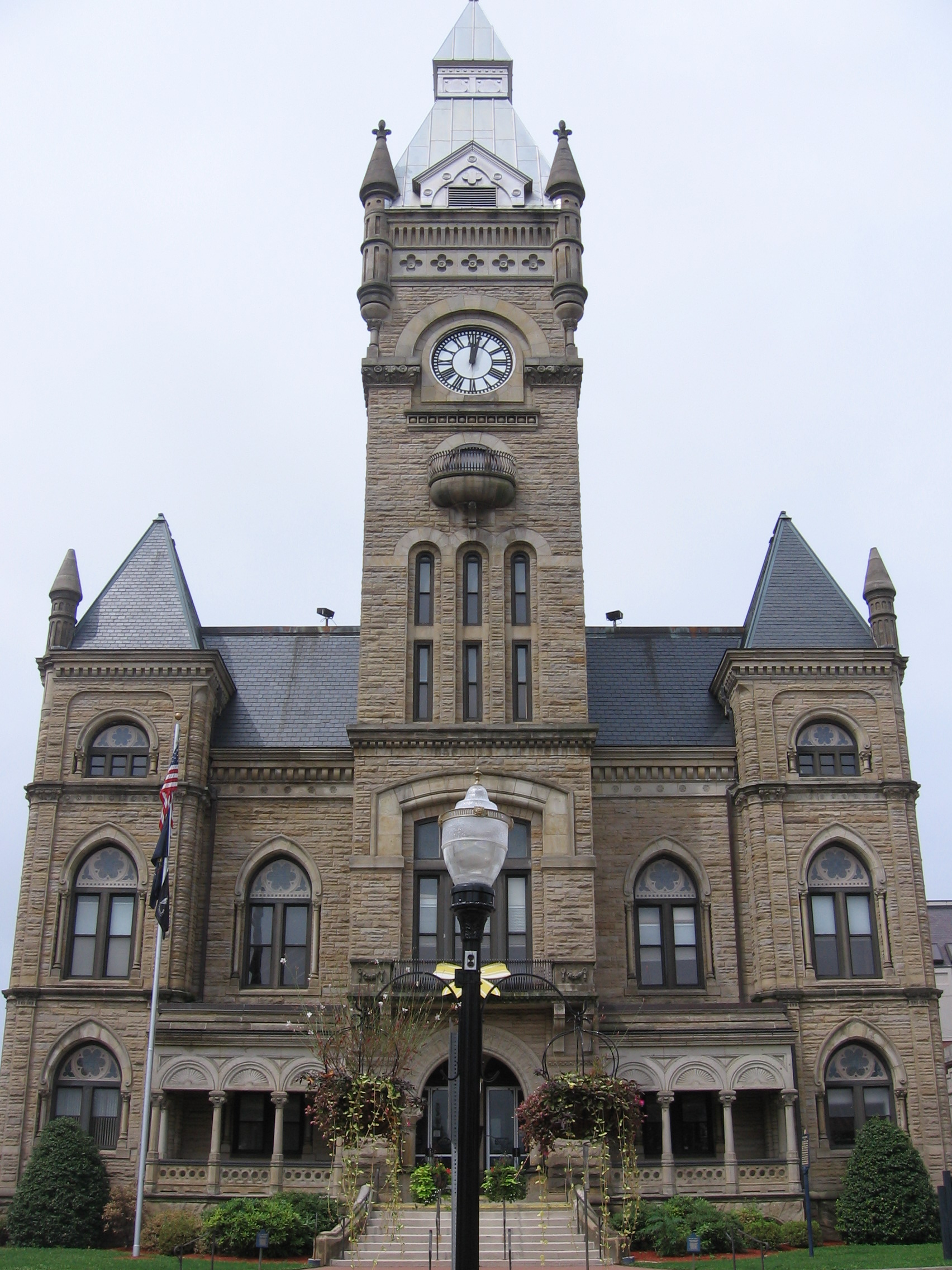
- Butler County Courthouse

- Location within Pennsylvania Location within the United States
- Interactive map showing the location for Butler County Courthouse
- Location: 124 W. Diamond St., Butler, Pennsylvania 16001
- Coordinates: 40°51′30″N 79°53′46″W
- Built: 1885
- Architect: James P. Bailey, R.B. Taylor
- Architectural style: Victorian
- NRHP reference No.: 77001132
- Added to NRHP: September 15, 1977

The Butler County Courthouse is a government building of Butler County located in the county seat, Butler, Pennsylvania.

The current structure is the third courthouse to have been built for the county. The original courthouse, built in 1807, was a small structure made of stone. James P. Bailey, who was responsible for the construction of Old Main at Geneva College became the architect of the new courthouse after the second one was destroyed by a fire in 1883. It was built in 1885, and is a three-story, brick and sandstone building in an interpretation of the High Victorian Gothic style. It features a large central, four-faced clock tower with two double pyramid shaped roofs.

Bailey's courthouse still stands today, and is currently the tallest structure in downtown Butler. The facility includes a Westinghouse elevator installed in the late 50s early 60s, several stained glass windows, a grand staircase connecting the first and second floors. The first and second floors are more designed to be gothic and art deco with several crown moldings, domed ceilings, marble floors and walls, and woodwork as well. The upper two floors have been made into offices and courtrooms. In the early 1990s a new government annex building was constructed beside the courthouse. The two structures are connected via skywalk. The annex building is 5 stories and consists of 2 basement levels, making a total of 7 floors. All 7 levels house offices and courtrooms.

The Butler County Courthouse was listed on the National Register of Historic Places in 1977.

== See also ==
- List of state and county courthouses in Pennsylvania
