= Lawrence Central High School =

Location
- 7300 East 56th Street; Indianapolis, Marion County, Indiana; United States; 39°51′23″N 86°02′23″W

Information
- Type: Public high school
- Established: 1941
- School district: M S D Lawrence Township
- Principal: Franklyn Bush
- Teaching staff: 126.83 (FTE)
- Grades: 9–12
- Enrollment: 2,417 (2023-2024)
- Student to teacher ratio: 19.06
- Color
- Athletics: Metropolitan Interscholastic Conference
- Team name: Bears
- Website: LCHS

Lawrence Central High School (LCHS) is a public high school in northeast Marion County, Indiana, United States. It enrolls more than 2,300 students.

== Overview ==
LCHS was established in 1940, and is one of two high schools in the Metropolitan School District of Lawrence Township.

== Extracurricular activities ==
=== Athletics ===
As of 2013, Lawrence Central High School left Conference Indiana and joined the Metropolitan Interscholastic Conference.

Sport	Year(s)
Baseball (1)	2004
Girls' basketball (1)	2024
Boys' track (3)	1998, 2005, 2012
Girls' track (3)	1996, 2010, 2014
Gymnastics (1)	2007
Football (1)	5A 2012

=== Performing arts ===
The former Lawrence Central Marching Band (the "Spirit of Central Marching Band & Guard") is a two-time Bands of America Grand National Champion, receiving the award in 2001 and 2004. The marching band is also the 2002 BOA Grand National Runner-Up and 2008 Grand National Second Runner-Up. At BOA Grand National Finals, the marching band has won the Outstanding Visual caption award in 2002, 2004, 2006, and 2008 (tie-Avon High School). The marching band has been a consistent BOA Grand National Finalist since 1996. The marching band has also won the ISSMA State Marching Band Championship in 1997, 1998, 2000, and 2008. The marching band has also performed in multiple parades, including the Philadelphia Thanksgiving Day parade in 1996 and 2002, the Hollywood Christmas Parade in 1999, the Tournament of Roses Parade in 2005, the 2006 Macy's Thanksgiving Day Parade, and the 2008 Fiesta Bowl Parade. At the 2008 Fiesta Bowl National Band Championship, the band won first place and the Grand Master Trophy. They are also the first band to win in the new Lucas Oil Stadium (Four Times) and the first to achieve a perfect score in the percussion sub-caption in 2008. In 2014, the Lawrence Central and Lawrence North marching bands combined to create The Marching Pride of Lawrence Township.

All three bands have not won a silver or lower since 1984 in the ISSMA competitions.The Wind Ensemble and Symphony Orchestra at Lawrence Central also both won their respective titles as ISSMA State Champions in 2005, as they have on a few occasions in the past, including a recent 2008 win. Lawrence Central is also home to two award-winning show choirs. "Central Sound" and "Sweet Sensation", who both compete in the ISSMA State Show choir competition along with other invitationals throughout the year. For the last three years "Sweet Sensation" has placed a respectable third place at the State Competition and placed first at Center Grove in 2008 and also at Anderson HS in 2007. The Central Sound was undefeated at all of the regional competitions they attended in 2009. Central Sound placed 3rd in the Nation at the Showstoppers Invitational in Orlando, Fl in 2009. Other performing arts programs include Thespian Society, Winter Guard, and Jazz Ensemble, as well as an award-winning speech team.

The Lawrence Central Performing Arts Association is the "umbrella" parent-teacher organization which engages families in activities involving each or all of the performing arts programs. It provides a novel approach through collaborative support, uniting all members in activities, regardless of which group their child is in, to benefit the program as a whole. Activities include fund-raising, volunteerism, and public relations.

== Notable alumni ==
- Austin Armacost, television personality, known for appearing on The A-List: New York and Celebrity Big Brother
- Kevin Brown, CFL linebacker
- Kind Butler III, track & field athlete, IU sprinter and world-record gold medalist in the 4 × 400 m indoor relay (2014)
- Dre Davis, NBA G-League basketball player for the Long Island Nets, 2024 NIT Champion
- Branson Deen, NFL defensive tackle for the Buffalo Bills
- Gerrid Doaks, NFL running back for the Houston Texans (drafted 2021)
- Megan Gailey, stand-up comedian, actress, and podcast host; television appearances include: After Midnight, Conan, @midnight, The Tonight Show Starring Jimmy Fallon
- Kyle Guy, CBA basketball player for the Shanxi Loongs, selected 55th overall, 2019 NBA Draft; 2019 NCAA National Champion and Final Four Most Outstanding Player
- Jeremy Hollowell, professional basketball player for Bauru Basket
- Ray Jackson (American football), former NFL running back who played for the Cincinnati Bengals and Tennessee Titans
- Jake LaRavia, NBA basketball player for the Los Angeles Lakers, selected 19th Overall, 2022 NBA Draft
- Frank Levinson, entrepreneur and investor, co-founder of Finisar
- Cameron McGrone, NFL linebacker for the Indianapolis Colts (drafted 2021)
- Julie McWhirter, voice actress and impressionist
- Nijel Pack, college basketball player for the Oklahoma Sooners, First Team All-Big 12 (2022)
- Sarah Jo Pender, convicted murderer, featured on America’s Most Wanted during her 2008 prison escape
- Derrick Ransom, former defensive tackle in the NFL (played in late 1990s / early 2000s)
- Tre Roberson, CFL cornerback for the Calgary Stampeders
- Norm Sloan, former college basketball coach, 1974 NCAA Champion, ACC Coach of the Year, overall record 627-395

== See also ==
- List of schools in Indianapolis
- List of high schools in Indiana
