= Jefferson Township, Butler County, Pennsylvania =

Township in Pennsylvania, US

Coordinates: 40°44′50″N 79°49′35″W

- Township
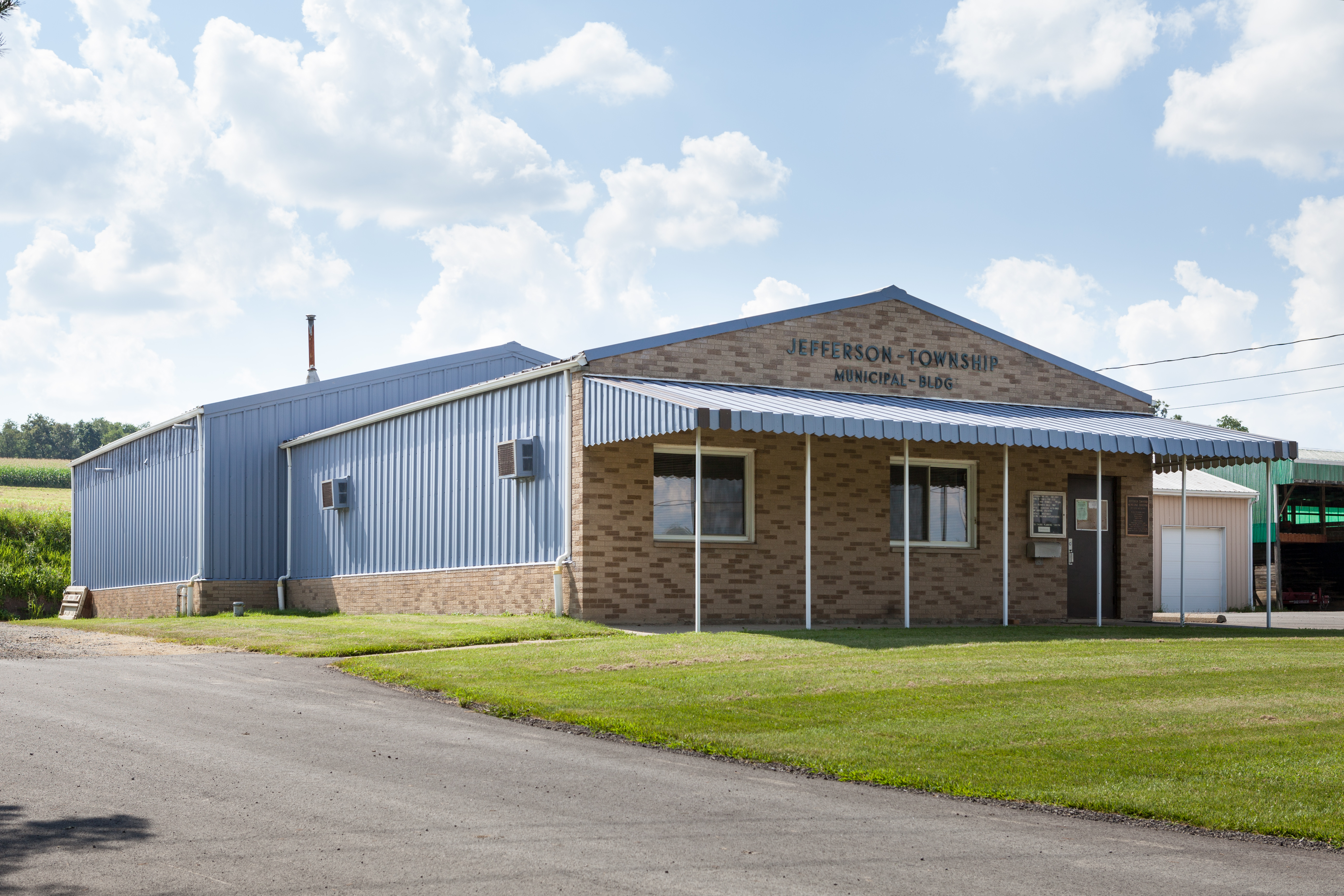
- Jefferson Township Municipal Building
- Motto: A nice place to live
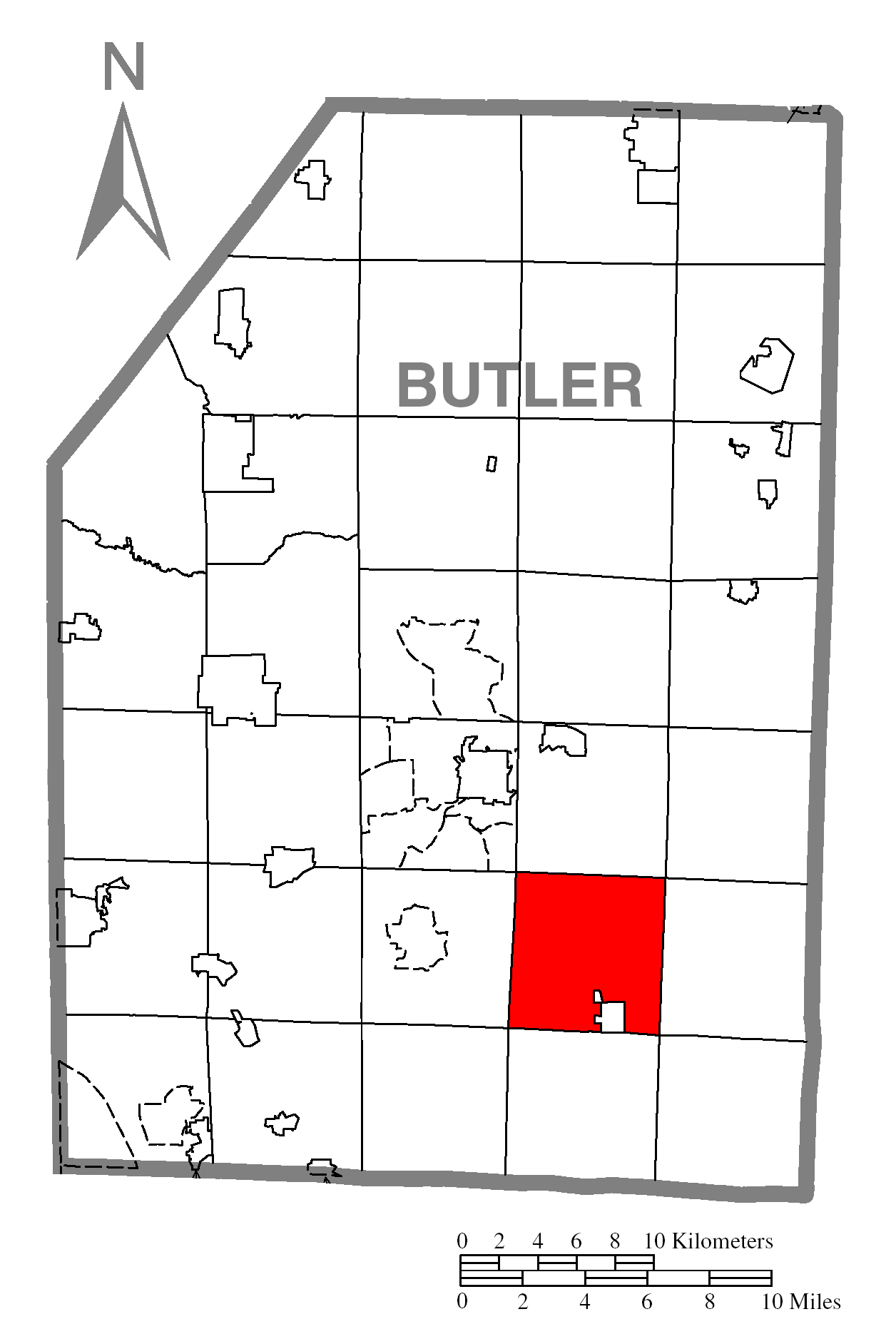
- Map of Butler County, Pennsylvania, highlighting Jefferson Township

- Map of Butler County, Pennsylvania
- Country: United States
- State: Pennsylvania
- County: Butler
- Settled: 1796
- Incorporated: 1854

Area
  - Total: 22.97 sq mi (59.48 km^{2})
  - Land: 22.94 sq mi (59.41 km^{2})
  - Water: 0.027 sq mi (0.07 km^{2})

Population (2020)
  - Total: 5,209 ▼
  - Estimate (2022): 5,103
  - Density: 233.5/sq mi (90.15/km^{2})
- Time zone: UTC-5 (Eastern (EST))
  - Summer (DST): UTC-4 (EDT)
- FIPS code: 42-019-37848
- Website: jeffersonbutler.com

Jefferson Township is a township in Butler County, Pennsylvania, United States. The population was 5,209 at the 2020 census.

== Geography ==
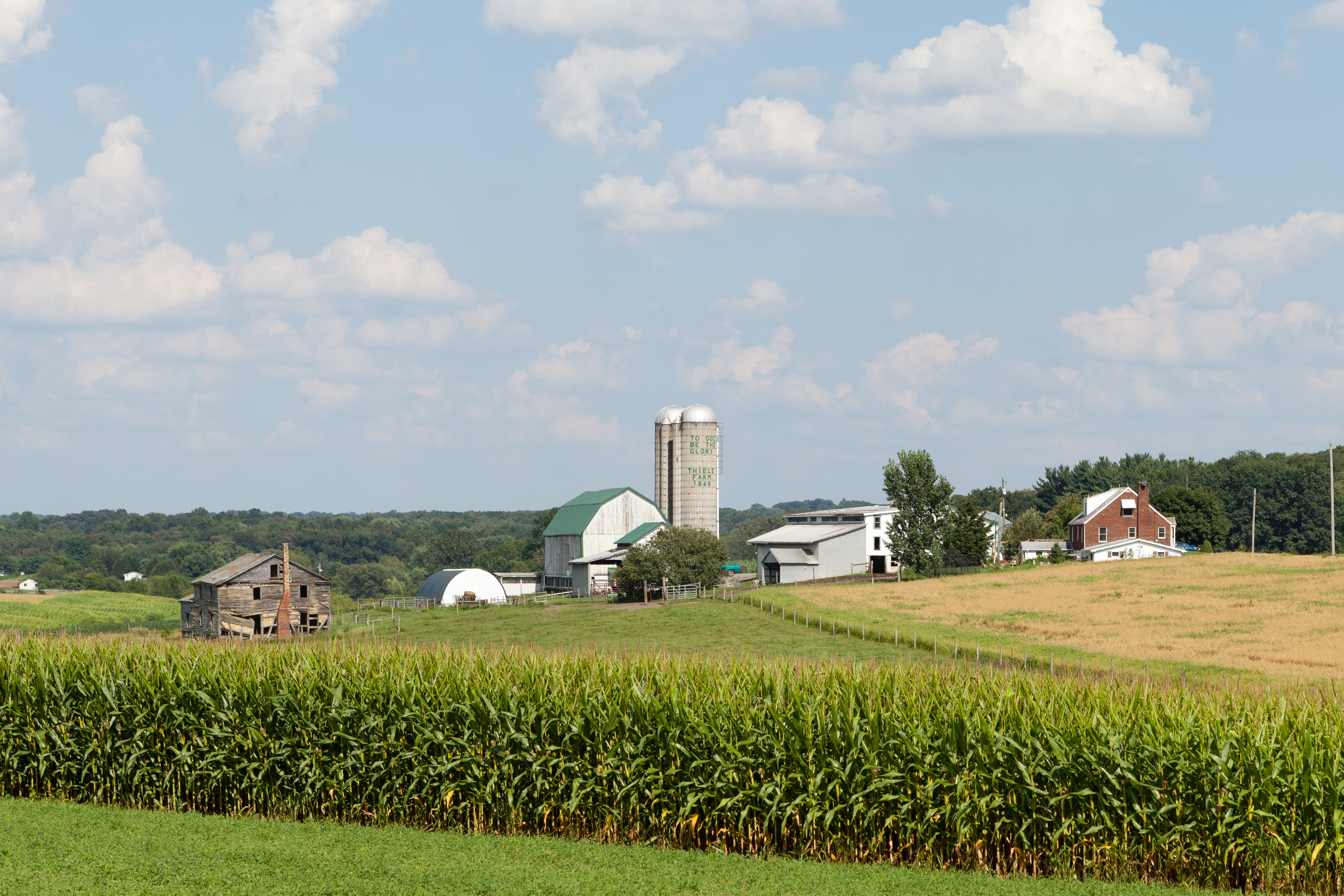
A dairy farm near route 356

Jefferson Township is located in southeastern Butler County. The borough of Saxonburg lies along the township's southern boundary but is separate from it. The township includes the unincorporated communities of Hannahstown and Jefferson Center.

According to the United States Census Bureau, the township has a total area of 23.0 square miles (59.5 km^{2}), of which 0.03 square miles (0.07 km^{2}), or 0.11%, is water.

== Demographics ==
Historical population
Census	Pop.	Note	%±
2010	5,504		—
2020	5,209		−5.4%
2022 (est.)	5,103		−2.0%
U.S. Decennial Census

As of the 2000 census, there were 5,690 people, 1,916 households, and 1,442 families residing in the township. The population density was 243.3 inhabitants per square mile (93.9/km^{2}). There were 1,970 housing units at an average density of 84.2 per square mile (32.5/km^{2}). The racial makeup of the township was 99.46% White, 0.16% African American, 0.05% Asian, 0.11% from other races, and 0.23% from two or more races. Hispanic or Latino of any race were 0.26% of the population.

There were 1,916 households, out of which 34.9% had children under the age of 18 living with them, 63.8% were married couples living together, 8.4% had a female householder with no husband present, and 24.7% were non-families. 21.9% of all households were made up of individuals, and 11.7% had someone living alone who was 65 years of age or older. The average household size was 2.64 and the average family size was 3.09.

In the township the population was spread out, with 23.3% under the age of 18, 5.9% from 18 to 24, 26.4% from 25 to 44, 21.8% from 45 to 64, and 22.6% who were 65 years of age or older. The median age was 42 years. For every 100 females, there were 85.0 males. For every 100 females age 18 and over, there were 80.1 males.

The median income for a household in the township was $42,885, and the median income for a family was $53,365. Males had a median income of $37,500 versus $25,426 for females. The per capita income for the township was $18,830. About 6.1% of families and 6.5% of the population were below the poverty line, including 9.2% of those under age 18 and 6.2% of those age 65 or over.

== Education ==
The township is in the Knoch School District (formerly the South Butler County School District).
