= Disappearance of Cherrie Mahan =

Unsolved disappearance of 8-year old American girl

Cherrie Ann Mahan
- Cherrie Mahan, c. 1984
- Born: Cherrie Ann Mahan; August 14, 1976; Saxonburg, Pennsylvania, U.S.
- Disappeared: February 22, 1985 (aged 8); Winfield Township, Butler County, Pennsylvania, U.S.
- Status: Declared dead in absentia November 5, 1998
- Known for: Missing person
- Height: 4 ft 2 in (1.27 m) (approximate)
- Parents: LeRoy McKinney (stepfather); Janice McKinney
- Distinguishing features: Caucasian female. 68 pounds. Brown hair, hazel eyes. Dog bite scar on left arm.

Cherrie Ann Mahan (August 14, 1976 – disappeared February 22, 1985; declared legally dead November 5, 1998) was an eight-year-old American girl who disappeared on February 22, 1985, after disembarking a school bus approximately fifty feet from the base of the driveway to her home in rural Winfield Township, Butler County, Pennsylvania. She was declared legally dead in November 1998. Mahan's abduction is strongly believed not to have been committed by a family member.

Mahan's disappearance is one of the most infamous unsolved missing child cases in the United States. The National Center for Missing and Exploited Children featured Mahan as the first missing child to be depicted upon postcards distributed nationwide alongside a headline reading, "Have You Seen Me?" Efforts to locate Mahan, alive or deceased, are ongoing.

== Background ==
Cherrie Ann Mahan (Note: Mahan's first name is phonetically pronounced "Cherry".) was born in Saxonburg, Pennsylvania, on August 14, 1976. Her mother, Janice Mahan, was 16 when she gave birth. Cherrie was described as a friendly, talkative child. Her mother would state: "We were always together. We grew up together. She was my life". Janice later married a Vietnam veteran named LeRoy McKinney, who considered Mahan his stepdaughter. In late 1984, the family relocated to Cornplanter Road in Butler County. Mahan attended Winfield Elementary School, where she was regarded as a bright, popular and happy child.

On Friday, February 22, 1985, the child was excited as her mother intended to take her on a play date when she returned from school. Mahan accompanied her mother to the bus stop located approximately fifty feet from the base of the uphill driveway to their home. When the school bus arrived, the two told each other they loved each other before Mahan boarded the bus.

== Disappearance ==
Locations February 22, 1985
1 Winfield Elementary School, 707 Winfield Road, Cabot, PA 16023.
2 4:10pm Complanter Road where Cherrie Mahan was last seen exiting the school bus.

Mahan was last seen exiting her school bus on Cornplanter Road on February 22, 1985. She exited the bus with three friends at approximately 4:10 p.m. before her friends entered a car driven by the mother of one of the girls, Debbie Burk, who had followed the school bus in her own car. Mahan was then observed walking past a bluish-green van which had parked near the bus stop (Note: Some reports describe this van as bright blue or green in color; some specifically describe the van as being bright blue.) and then turning a corner to walk the approximately 150-yard uphill driveway to her home. (Note: Burk was adamant this Dodge van had also followed the school bus, recounting this sighting in April 1985, Burk stated: "I sat in the car and watched the kids get off. They played for a while. I made sure Cherrie had walked past the car, then I drove away. I caught a glimpse of the blue van in the mirror. It was right behind me.") The van was later described as a 1970s-era Dodge (possibly a 1976 model) with a distinctive mural depicting a skier traversing a snowcapped mountain painted on the side. Burk was the last individual to see Mahan before she was kidnapped.

At the time of her disappearance, Mahan was eight years old. She was 4 feet 2 inches (1.27 m) in height and had brown hair and hazel eyes. Mahan was wearing a gray coat, a blue denim skirt, a white leotard, blue leg warmers, beige boots, and Cabbage Patch earmuffs.

Mahan's stepfather, LeRoy McKinney, overheard the school bus slowing to a halt near his home. He later recollected he had intended to walk down the 150-yard driveway to meet his stepdaughter before his wife said: "No, it's a nice day. Let her walk." When ten minutes had elapsed and Mahan had not arrived, her mother and stepfather began to worry. A search of their driveway did not locate the child or any of her footprints upon the snow on the ground leading to her house, although they did discover a set of tire impressions in the driveway soil approximately fifty yards from their home.

== Investigation ==
Police immediately launched an intense search to locate Mahan. The terrain around her home was extensively searched with the assistance of bloodhounds and helicopters, and investigators conducted house to house inquiries. A thorough search of Butler County was bolstered by an estimated 250 local volunteers, although these searches failed to locate the child. Mahan's local community raised $39,000 as a reward for Mahan's safe return, with a local business also pledging an additional $10,000 for information leading to an arrest and conviction of her abductor or abductors.

Investigators quickly discounted any possibility Mahan had been kidnapped for a ransom; (Note: Shortly before her disappearance, Mahan had received a broken arm after being hit by a car. She received $3,500 in compensation for her injuries.) concluding the child most likely knew her abductor or abductors, although all family members were quickly eliminated as suspects.

=== Suspect vehicle ===
Artist's rendering of the Dodge van emblazoned with a distinctive mural seen close to the location of Mahan's abduction

Appeals as to sightings of the distinctive bluish-green Dodge van produced eyewitnesses who informed investigators they had seen a vehicle matching this description in New Kensington, traveling in the direction of Mount Pleasant. Other witnesses stated they had seen a blue car following this van, and that the van was repainted black one or two weeks after Mahan's disappearance.

When no significant leads developed and the child had been missing for three months, a national direct mailing company printed a photograph of Mahan on postcards accompanied by the question "Have you seen me?" These cards were mailed to thousands of households across the U.S., placed inside telephone and utility bills, alongside an artist's rendition of the distinctive van seen in the vicinity of her abduction. (Note: Cherrie Mahan was the first individual to whom this initiative was used in efforts to locate a missing child.)

== Ongoing investigation ==
In the decades since Mahan's disappearance, investigators have pursued thousands of leads pertaining to the child's whereabouts and the identity of her abductor or abductors. Most of these leads have been potential sightings of Mahan or the two vehicles observed in the vicinity of her abduction, although the child has never been found, and neither vehicle was ever located. (Note: In 1985, approximately sixty-two percent of missing children in America were safely recovered. This figure has since greatly increased.) Lacking any conclusive evidence to the contrary, investigators have not discounted the possibility Mahan may still be alive.

Pennsylvania State Police continue to receive tips and updates relating to Mahan's disappearance. In 2000, a computer-generated rendition of how Mahan may have looked at age 23 was mailed to thousands of households across America. This line of inquiry failed to generate any significant leads.

In January 2011, Pennsylvania police received a new tip they deemed as "potentially crucial to the investigation in the future". Although investigators declined to release specific details as to this line of inquiry beyond stating the information sourced from an individual known to the child who had provided information with the potential to lead police to "a known specific actor or actors", a spokesman stated the information received had been "more specific" than any information investigators had received in many years. This spokesman declined to further elaborate, citing the ongoing investigation. However, investigators did state this "potentially crucial" information indicates Mahan is unlikely to still be alive.

A further line of inquiry investigators pursued dates from 2014, when investigators pursued a tip that Mahan was alive and living under an assumed name in Michigan. The individual named in this letter was a woman who had been adopted as a child and was unsure of her precise origins, although DNA testing later confirmed this woman was not Mahan.

"I believe Cherrie was abducted by someone she knows very well, and I believe this person had the ability to basically lure Cherrie [into] their vehicle without her giving it a second thought prior to her disappearance ... I can't imagine if that was my child. I can't imagine the pain her mother must wake up with every day."

— Pennsylvania State Police Officer Robert McGraw, referencing the ongoing investigation into Cherrie Mahan's disappearance. January 2011

One of the most recent lines of inquiry investigators pursued dates from 2018, when McKinney received an anonymous handwritten letter describing in detail who had murdered her daughter, why they had done so, and where her remains are buried. The author of this letter concluded this correspondence by stating: "I pray you find some peace after you find her body."

== Legal declaration ==
Although existing laws had determined Cherrie Mahan could have been declared legally dead seven years after her disappearance, (Note: The law of Pennsylvania states that seven years must elapse between the disappearance of an individual and the legal declaration of his or her death.) Mahan's mother only petitioned to have her daughter legally declared deceased in 1998. A Butler County judge approved a petition from Janice McKinney to do so in November that year. Three months earlier, she had donated the $50,000 reward sum for information leading to the safe return of her daughter to the National Center for Missing and Exploited Children. Cherrie Mahan's trust fund was given to her younger brother, Robert, who was born four years after Mahan's disappearance.

Addressing the media following the conclusion of these legal proceedings, Janice McKinney stated: "When people die, you have a body. You kiss [them upon] the face, you put them in the ground, and you say goodbye ... that's something I never had. This is not over. We'll always look for Cherrie. If nothing else, she'll always be [alive] in our hearts."

=== Mother's theory ===
Mahan's mother, Janice McKinney, has stated her conviction her daughter's disappearance can still be solved. In 2020, McKinney revealed her conviction that although she does not believe Cherrie's biological father was involved in her abduction, she believes individuals known to him were. Mahan's mother has stated that prior to her daughter's disappearance, nobody had believed her claims that her daughter had been conceived through her being raped, adding that on "any other day", she would have been standing at the bottom of her driveway to meet her daughter when the school bus arrived, and that February 22, 1985, was the first day she had not done so. (Note: Mahan's biological father remains a "person of interest" in the child's abduction.)

== Aftermath ==
In 2019, Mahan's mother discussed her ongoing turmoil as to the lack of knowledge of her daughter's fate. Emphasizing her belief that an anonymous tip from the public could finally give herself and her family the closure they crave, McKinney stated to the media: "I just wish someone would come forth and tell me what happened. That's all I pray for, all the time, is just to know."

Cherrie Mahan's family and friends hold an annual remembrance dinner at a restaurant in East Butler on a date close to each anniversary of her disappearance. At this event, stories and memories of Cherrie are shared. Four of the attendees of this annual dinner are close friends of Mahan, who have each publicly stated the disappearance of their friend has had a profound impact on their lives, and that becoming mothers themselves has increased their empathy for Janice McKinney's sense of loss.

== See also ==
- Child abduction
- Cold case
- Crime in Pennsylvania
- List of people who disappeared mysteriously (1990s)
- National Center for Missing and Exploited Children
- The Doe Network

== Cited works and further reading ==
- Collins, James J. (1999). Law Enforcement Policies and Practices Regarding Missing Children and Homeless Youth. United States: Office of Juvenile Justice and Delinquency Prevention. ISBN 978-0-788-18639-4.
- Fisher, Bonnie S.; Lab, Steven P. (2010). Encyclopedia of Victimology and Crime Prevention. Los Angeles: Sage Publishing. ISBN 978-1-412-96047-2.
- Fridell, Ronald (2008). Forensic Science. London: Lerner Books. ISBN 978-1-580-13422-4.
- Katz, Hélèna (2010). Cold Cases: Famous Unsolved Mysteries, Crimes, and Disappearances in America. Santa Barbara: Greenwood Publishing Group. ISBN 978-0-313-37692-4.
- Murphy, Paul (2011). Guide for Implementing or Enhancing an Endangered Missing Advisory (EMA). Washington: U. S. Department of Justice. ISBN 978-1-437-98383-8.
- Pettem, Silvia (2017). The Long Term Missing: Hope and Help for Families. Maryland: Rowman & Littlefield. ISBN 978-1-442-25680-4.
- Sprague, Donald F. (2013). Investigating Missing Children Cases: A Guide for First Responders and Investigators. New York: Taylor & LFrancis Group. ISBN 978-1-439-86063-2.
