= Cabot, Pennsylvania =

Unincorporated community in Pennsylvania, US

- Unincorporated community
- Location within Pennsylvania
- Coordinates: 40°45′57.6″N 79°45′50.4″W
- Country: United States
- State: Pennsylvania
- County: Butler
- Elevation: 1,198 ft (365 m)
- Time zone: UTC-5 (Eastern (EST))
  - Summer (DST): UTC-4 (EDT)
- ZIP code: 16023
- GNIS feature ID: 1170861

Cabot is an unincorporated community in Butler County, Pennsylvania, United States.

== History ==
Cabot was founded in 1806 as a rural community in Winfield Township. The community was first founded by Frederick Doerr, but the town eventually became named after Godfrey Lowell Cabot, who founded the Cabot Academy. The community has a history of being an agricultural community closely associated with Winfield Township.

Eight-year-old Cherrie Mahan, the first child featured on the direct-mailer marketer company ADVO's "Have You Seen Me?" program, disappeared after getting off her school bus near her home near Cabot on February 22, 1985. She has never been found.

On July 19, 2024, the funeral of Corey Comperatore, a firefighter and the only person killed in the attempted assassination of Donald Trump, was held at the church he was a member of. The funeral was attended by thousands of mourners.
