= Pittsburgh-Butler Regional Airport =

Airport in Pennsylvania, United States of America

Pittsburgh-Butler Regional Airport K. W. Scholter Field, Butler County Airport

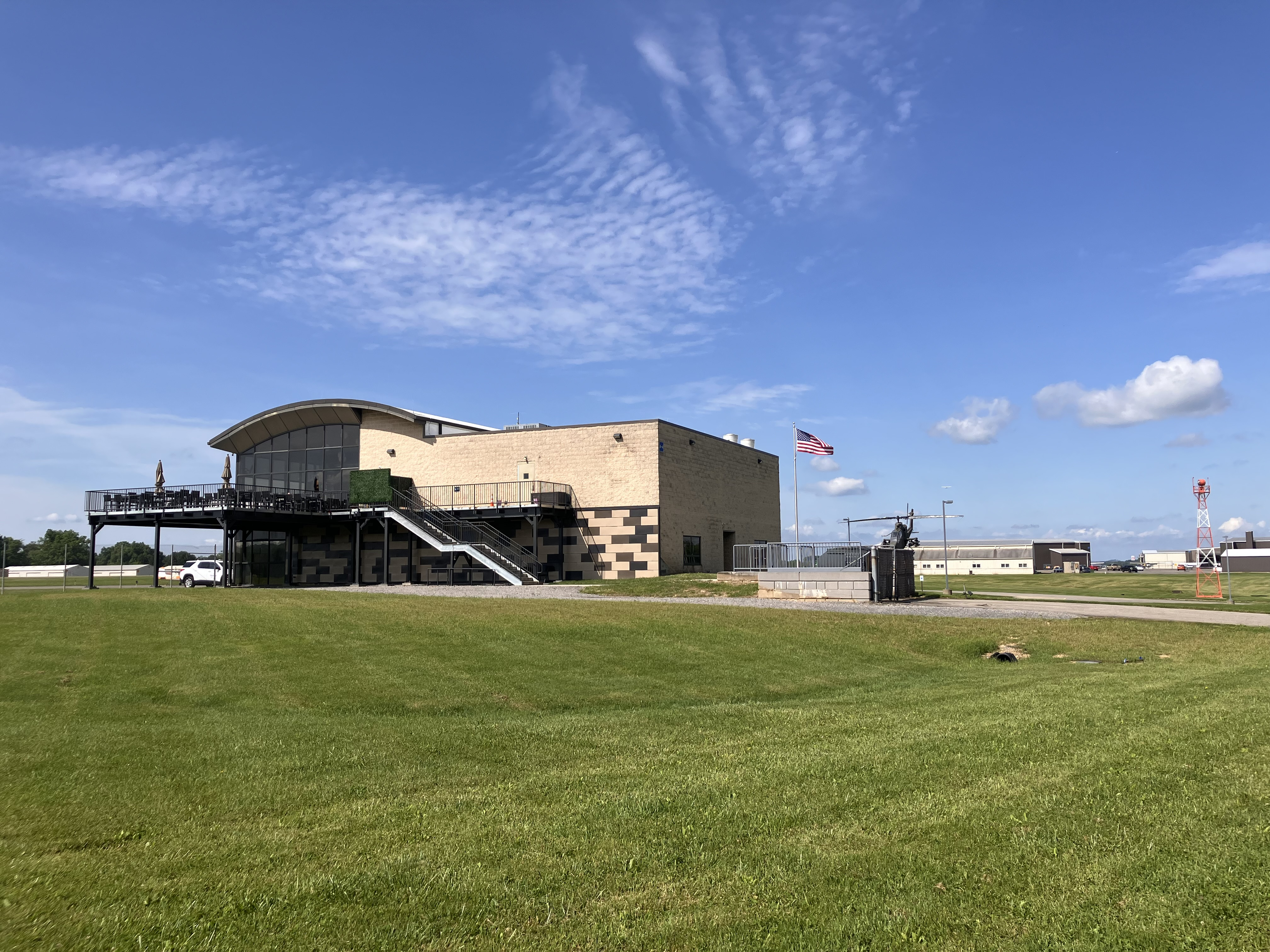
- Airport management office building
- IATA: BTP; ICAO: KBTP; FAA LID: BTP

Summary
- Airport type: Public
- Owner: Butler County Airport Authority
- Serves: Butler, Pennsylvania, U.S.
- Location: Penn Township, Butler County, Pennsylvania, U.S.
- Elevation AMSL: 1,248 ft / 380 m
- Coordinates: 40°46′37″N 079°56′59″W
- Website: Pittsburgh-Butler Regional Airport

Maps
- FAA airport sketch

- Location of airport in Pennsylvania BTP (the United States)

Runways
| Direction | Length | | Surface |
| Direction | ft | m | Surface |
|---|---|---|---|
| 8/26 | 4,801 | 1,463 | Asphalt |

Statistics (2024)
- Aircraft operations (year ending 6/15/2020): 74,386
- Based aircraft: 110
- Source: Federal Aviation Administration

Pittsburgh-Butler Regional Airport (IATA: BTP, ICAO: KBTP, FAA LID: BTP), also known as the Butler County Airport or K. W. Scholter Field, is a public airport in Pennsylvania, United States. It is owned by the Butler County Airport Authority. The 2025-2029 National Plan of Integrated Airport Systems lists the airport as a regional reliever airport.

== Location ==
Pittsburgh-Butler Regional Airport is located in Penn Township, 5 miles (8 km) southwest of the central business district of Butler, the county seat of Butler County, Pennsylvania, United States. The airport serves the northern suburbs of the Pittsburgh metropolitan area.

== History ==
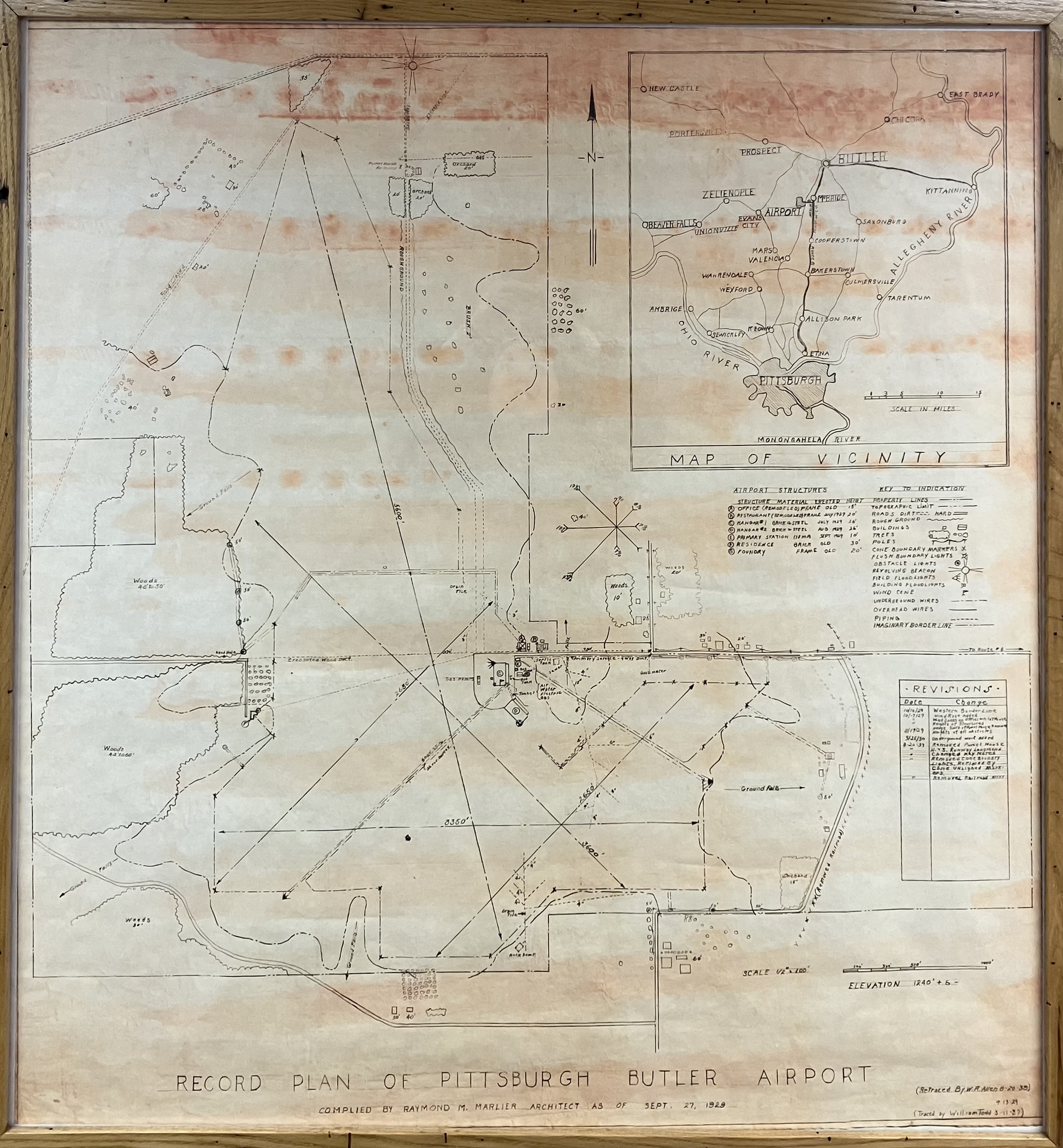
Record plan of Pittsburgh Butler Airport in 1929

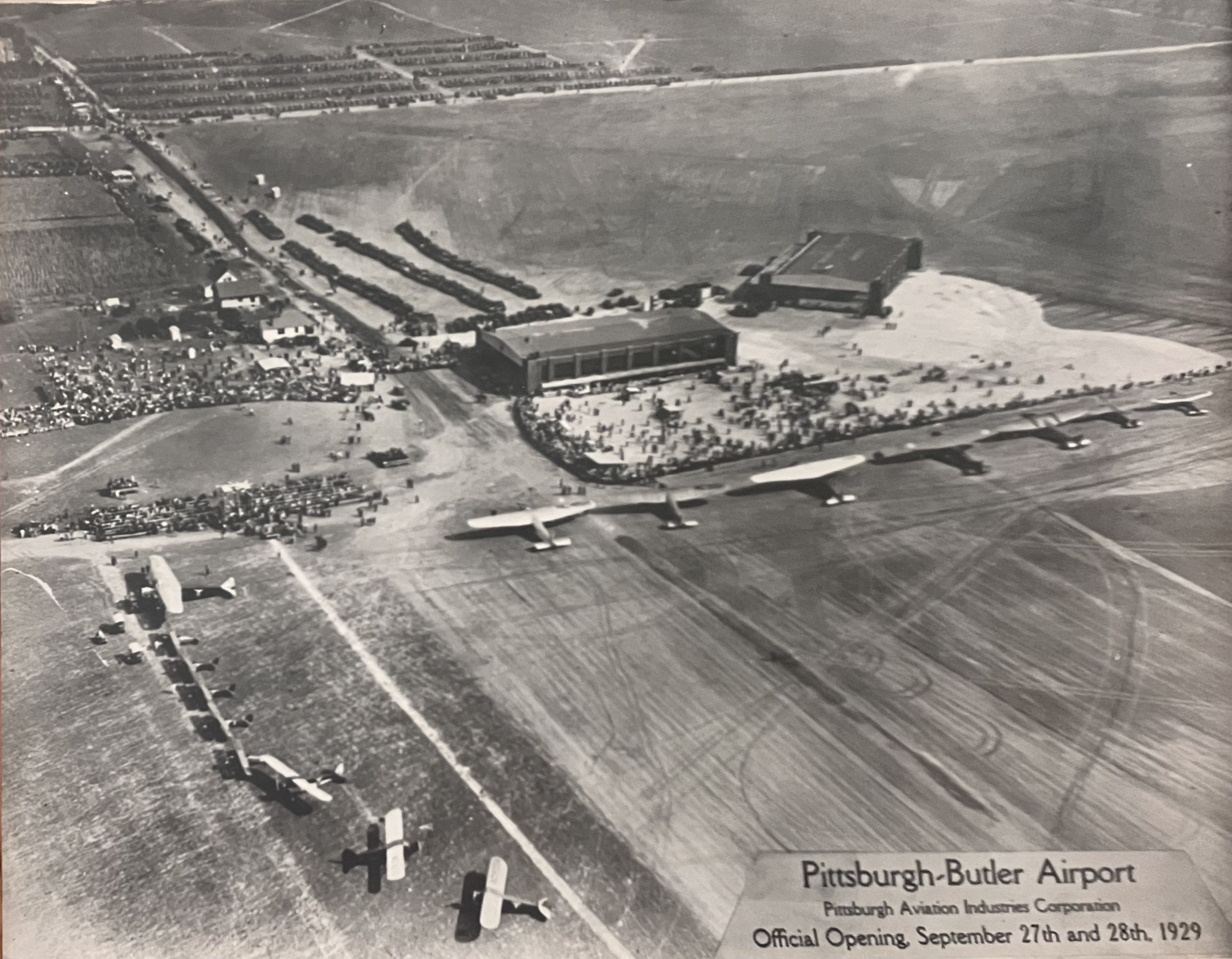
opening of the airport

Pittsburgh-Butler Regional Airport, formerly Butler County Airport, opened as the Pittsburgh-Butler Airport on September 27 and 28, 1929, with much fanfare and aircraft demonstrations. The airport originally had three turf runways, one of which was later paved, and a turf runway closed. The remaining turf runway ran N/S. The airport was opened by Pennsylvania Aviation Industrial Corp. (PAIC), owned by George Hann, the Mellon interests and some others, who hoped to lure Pittsburgh traffic.

During the Great Depression, the airport shut down for some years when there was little business. The two large hangars were used to store corn.

In the 1930s, John Graham along with Kenny Sholter helped to clean out the hangars and reopened the airport. It was then renamed the Butler-Graham Airport.

During its early years, the airport served as an important training area for potential pilots. Amelia Earhart received her instrument flight certificate there while practicing for her solo flight over the Atlantic Ocean in 1932. It was at the airport that Earhart had the long-range fuel tanks installed on her Lockheed Vega. Another notable aviator was C.G. Taylor, who in 1935 moved his Taylorcraft Aircraft company to Butler. His new planes were tested at the airport, and his Taylorcraft B model was introduced here. During World War II. Graham Aviation trained so many pilots under the Civilian Pilot Training Program that Piper Cubs had to be stored tilted up on their noses to fit them all in the hangars.

For many years, Butler-Graham served as an alternate airport for TWA should the weather be down at Allegheny County Airport, which from 1931 to 1952 was the primary airport of the city of Pittsburgh until Pittsburgh International Airport opened.

By the late 1990s, the airport was too small to handle the number of aircraft coming in, so plans were made to extend the runway by 800 feet (240 m). The extension of the single runway was completed in 2004.

The airport had a name change in 2016, going from the Butler County Airport to the Pittsburgh-Butler Regional Airport.

On October 31, 2020, President Donald Trump held a rally at the airport during his second run for president in the 2020 United States presidential election. In 2024, Trump's campaign team requested a rally again at the airport, but was denied by the airport authority due to a conflict in venue. Trump eventually held his campaign at the nearby Butler Farm Show Airport, where an attempted assassination happened.

== Facilities and aircraft ==
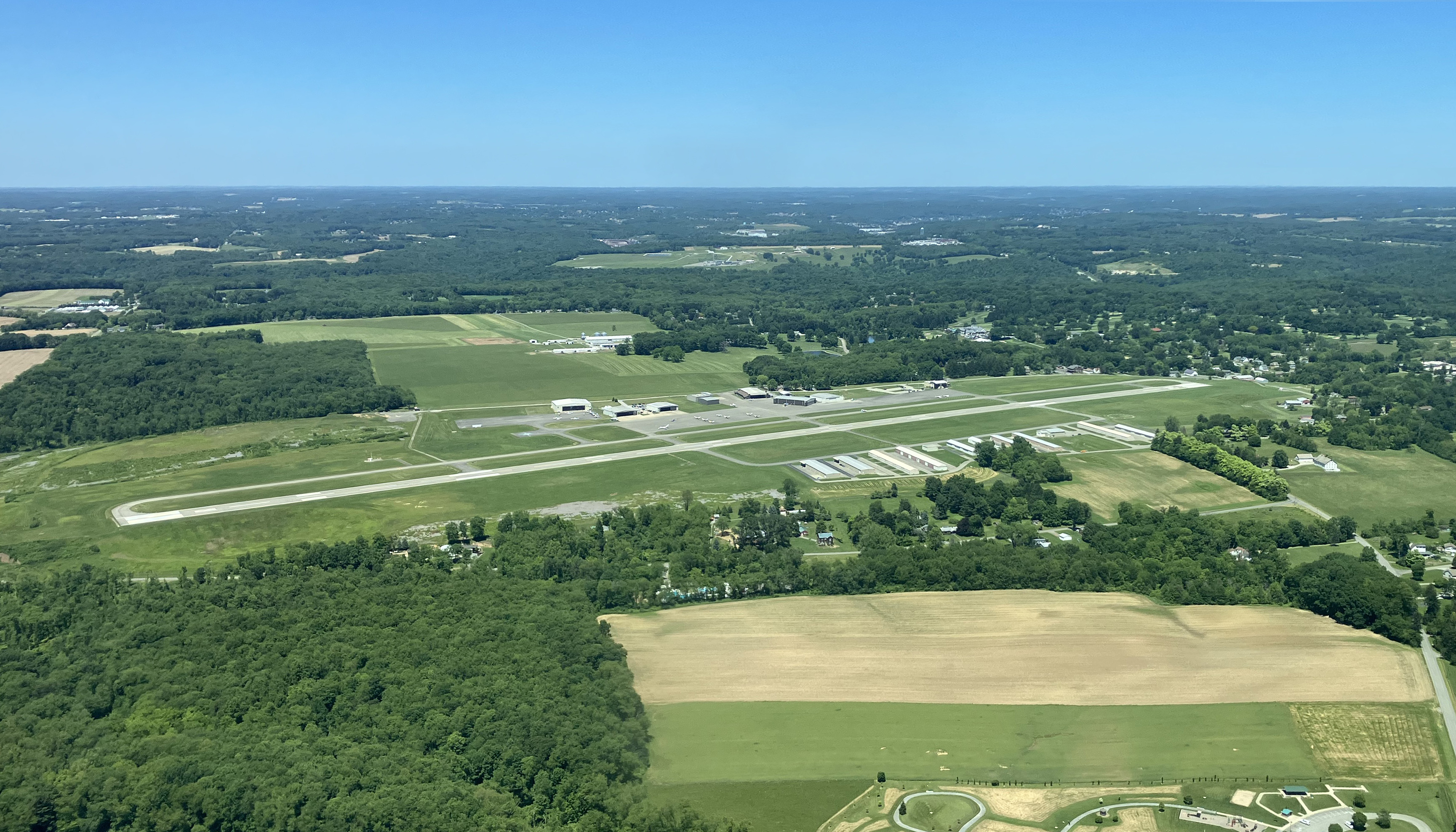
View of the airport from the air

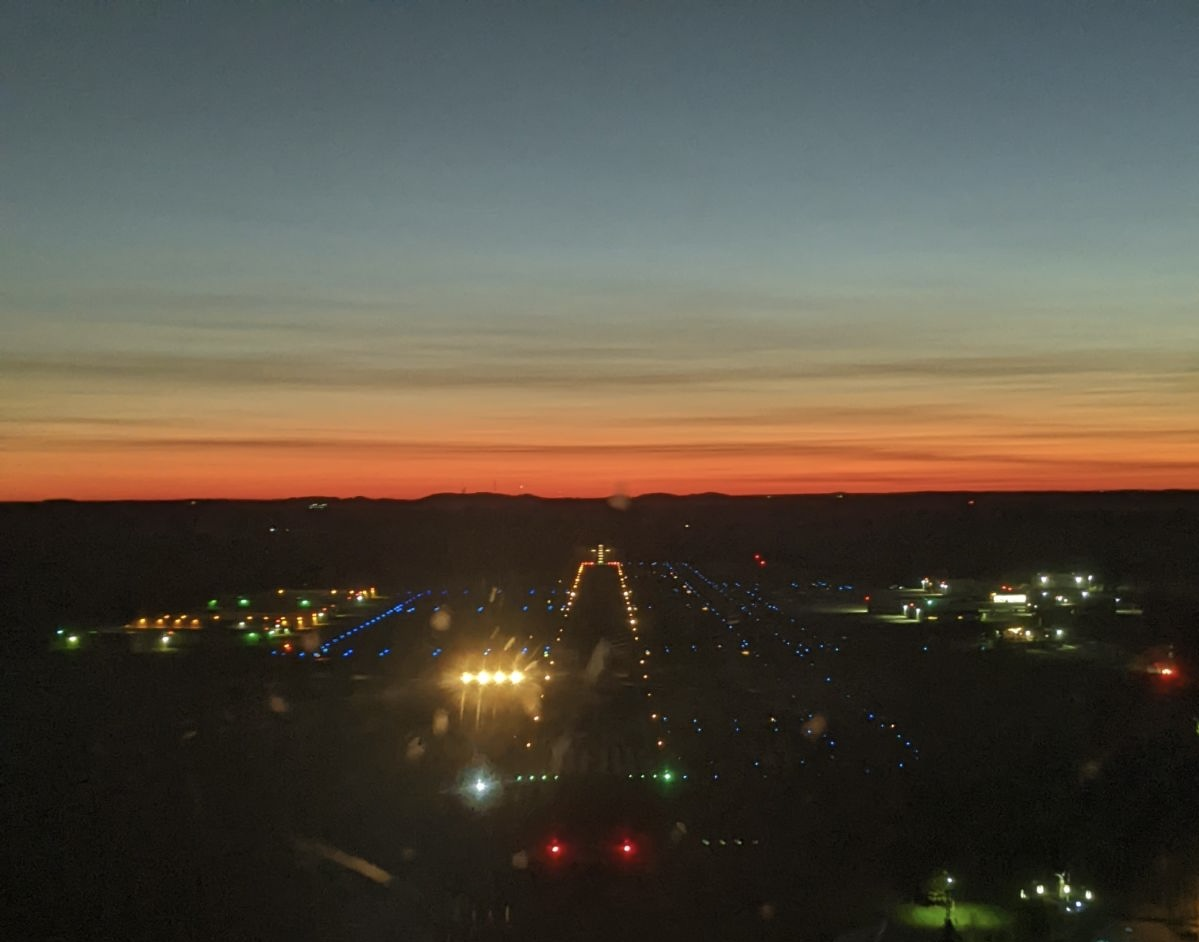
View of runway 26 at dusk

Pittsburgh-Butler Regional Airport covers an area of 304 acres (123 ha). It contains one asphalt paved runway designated 8/26, which measures 4,801 by 100 feet (1,463 by 30 m).

For the 12-month period ending June 15, 2020, the airport had 74,386 aircraft operations, an average of 204 per day: 98% general aviation, 2% air taxi and <1% military. As of May 16, 2024, there were 110 aircraft based at this airport: 89 single-engine, 8 multi-engine, 8 jet, 4 helicopter, and 1 glider. In 2023, the airport had over 87,000 operations.

The airport has an onsite restaurant. It also has a helicopter base for Allegheny Health Network's air ambulance service.

== Accidents and incidents ==
- On February 27, 2003, a Cessna 182G crashed while approaching to land due to ice accumulation, killing the pilot onboard.
- On January 24, 2007, a Cessna Citation 550 overran the snowy runway on landing, resulting in 1 serious injury and 3 minor injuries and aircraft being substantially damaged.
- On June 7, 2018, a Vans RV4 crashed shortly after taking off from the airport due to a total loss of engine power, resulting in aircraft substantially damaged and the pilot injured.

== See also ==
- List of airports in Pennsylvania

== Sources ==
- An Historical Gazetteer of Butler County, Pennsylvania, Chicora: Mechling Bookbindery, 2006, ISBN 978-0-9760563-9-3.
- Brandberg, Robert, and James Clements, Lost Butler, New Wilmington: New Horizons Publishing, 1999, ISBN 1-884687-25-3.
- Ed Biller, "Airport turns 80," Butler Eagle, December 6, 2009.
- Parisi, Larry D., Butler County, Arcadia Publishing, 2004, ISBN 0-7385-3517-6.
