= Branson Deen =

American football player (born 2000)

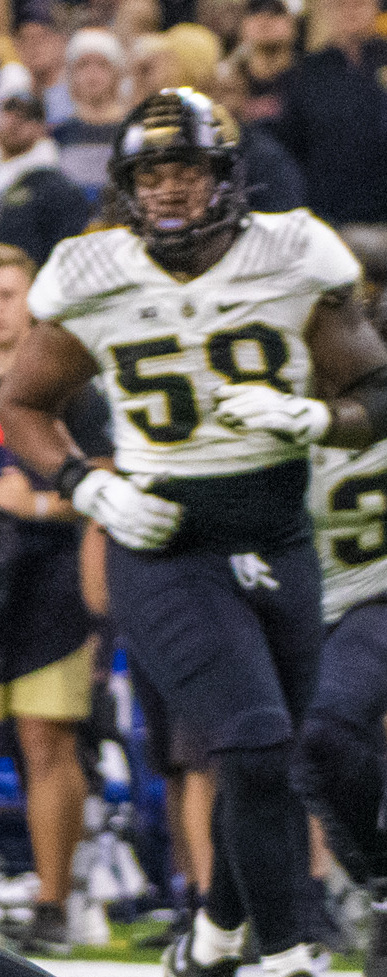

Hamilton Tiger-Cats
- Position: Defensive tackle
- Roster status: Active
- CFL status: American

Personal information
- Born: February 12, 2000 (age 26); Indianapolis, Indiana, U.S.
- Listed height: 6 ft 1 in (1.85 m)
- Listed weight: 298 lb (135 kg)

Career information
- High school: Lawrence Central (Marion County, Indiana)
- College: Purdue (2018–2022); Miami (2023)
- NFL draft: 2024: undrafted

Career history
- Buffalo Bills (2024); Hamilton Tiger-Cats (2026–present)
- Stats at Pro Football Reference
- Stats at CFL.ca

Branson Milan Deen (born February 12, 2000) is an American professional football defensive tackle for the Hamilton Tiger-Cats of the Canadian Football League (CFL). He played college football for the Purdue Boilermakers and Miami Hurricanes.

== Early life ==
Deen was born on February 12, 2000, and grew up in Indianapolis, Indiana. He attended Lawrence Central High School in Indiana, where he played football and recorded 42 tackles as a senior. A three-star recruit, he committed to play college football for the Purdue Boilermakers.

== College career ==
As a freshman at Purdue in 2018, Deen redshirted. He then appeared in nine games in 2019, totaling eight tackles, and six games in 2020, making 12 tackles and a sack while starting four games. He remained a starter in 2021, being named honorable mention All-Big Ten Conference after recording 26 tackles, 10 tackles-for-loss (TFLs), 4.5 sacks and a forced fumble. In 2022, he appeared in 12 games, posting 28 tackles, four TFLs and 2.5 sacks while repeating as an honorable mention All-Big Ten selection. Deen entered the NCAA transfer portal after the season, concluding his stint at Purdue having appeared in 32 games, making 73 tackles, 15.5 TFLs and 6.5 sacks. He transferred to the Miami Hurricanes in 2023 for his final season of college football. With the Hurricanes, he totaled 18 tackles, 5.5 TFLs and 2.5 sacks in 11 games, five of which he started.

== Professional career ==
Pre-draft measurables
Height	Weight	Arm length	Hand span	Wingspan	40-yard dash	10-yard split	20-yard split	20-yard shuttle	Three-cone drill	Vertical jump	Broad jump
6 ft 1 3/8 in (1.86 m)	298 lb (135 kg)	32 1/2 in (0.83 m)	10 1/8 in (0.26 m)	6 ft 7 5/8 in (2.02 m)	5.41 s	1.70 s	2.91 s	4.71 s	7.91 s	24.0 in (0.61 m)	8 ft 6 in (2.59 m)
All values from Pro Day

=== Buffalo Bills ===
After going unselected in the 2024 NFL draft, Deen signed with the Buffalo Bills. He was waived on August 27, 2024, and re-signed to the practice squad the following day. He was elevated to the active roster for the team's Week 5 game against the Houston Texans. He was released on December 17.

On January 30, 2025, Deen re-signed with the Bills on a reserve/future contract. On April 17, Deen was released by the Bills.

=== Hamilton Tiger-Cats ===
Deen signed with the Hamilton Tiger-Cats of the Canadian Football League (CFL) on December 1, 2025.
