= Knoch School District =

School district in Pennsylvania

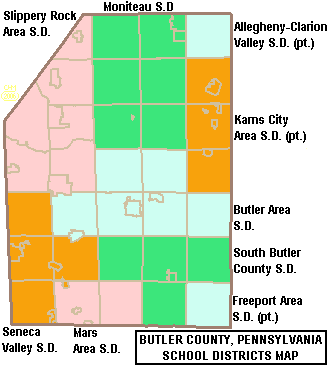

Address
- 328 Knoch Road Saxonburg, Pennsylvania, 16056; United States

District information
- Grades: K-12
- Superintendent: David Foley

Other information
- Website: www.knochsd.org

The Knoch School District (before 2022: South Butler County School District) is a school district located in southern Butler County, Pennsylvania.

It teaches students from Clinton, Jefferson, Penn, and Winfield townships, and Saxonburg Borough. The district includes the census-designated place of Nixon, in Penn Township.

The board of directors approved renaming the district to Knoch School District effective July 1, 2022.

Four schools make up the school district - Knoch High School (9-12), Knoch Middle School (6-8), Knoch Intermediate Elementary School (4-5) and Knoch Primary School (K-3). These buildings house approximate 2,850 students of the community and employs 279 people: 16 administrative/management personnel, 183 teachers, and 80 support staff.
