= Renfrew, Pennsylvania =

Unincorporated village in Pennsylvania, U.S.

Coordinates: 40°48′24″N 79°57′53″W

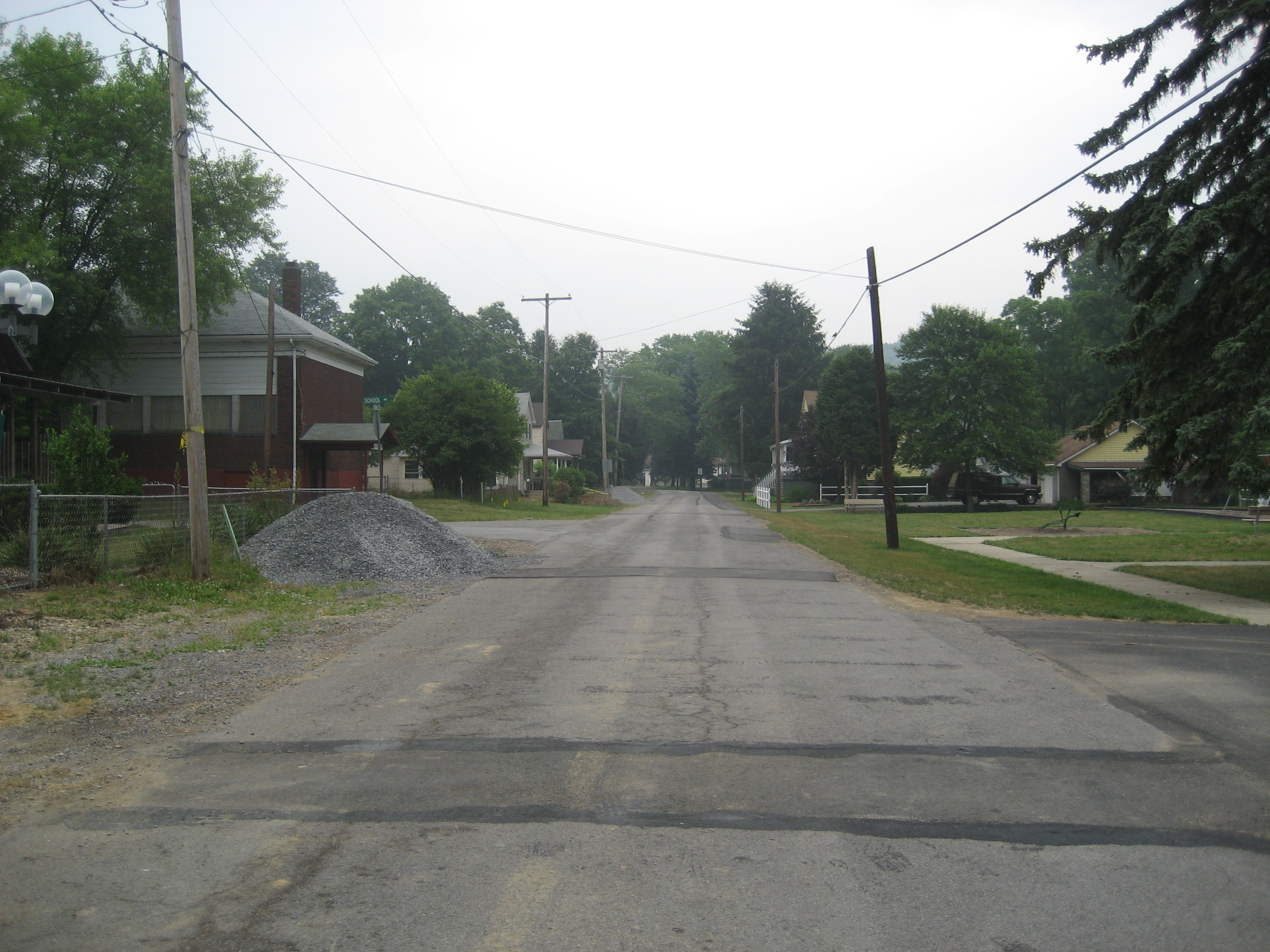
Main Street Renfrew (2007)

Renfrew is a small unincorporated village on the Connoquenessing Creek in Penn Township, Butler County, Pennsylvania, United States. It was founded by David A. Renfrew in 1882 on his farm. It was once a booming oil town with a general store, a school, a post office, a gas station, and a Methodist church. In September 2004, Renfrew experienced massive flooding due to rainfall caused by the remnants of Hurricane Ivan. The Buffalo and Pittsburgh Railroad still runs materials to and from the AK Steel mill in Butler, through Renfrew along Railroad St. Once used by the Baltimore and Ohio Railroad, it was at one time a thriving railway that would travel down to Pittsburgh.

== Demographics ==
Historical population
Census	Pop.	Note	%±
2023 (est.)	128

The United States Census Bureau defined Renfrew as a census designated place (CDP) in 2023.

== Gallery ==
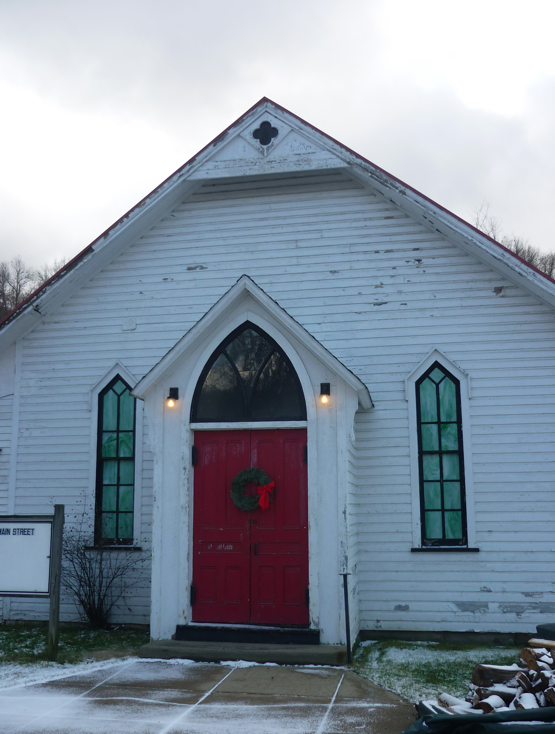
Former Methodist Church on Main Street (2011)

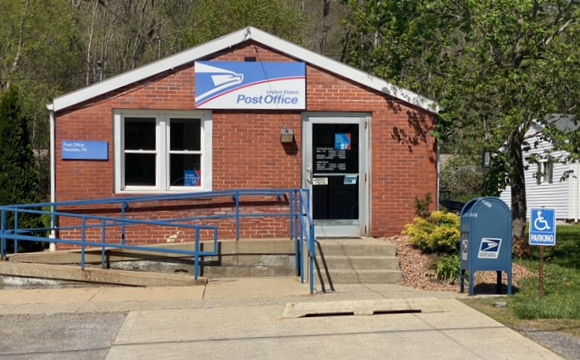
The post office in Renfrew, Pennsylvania (2021)

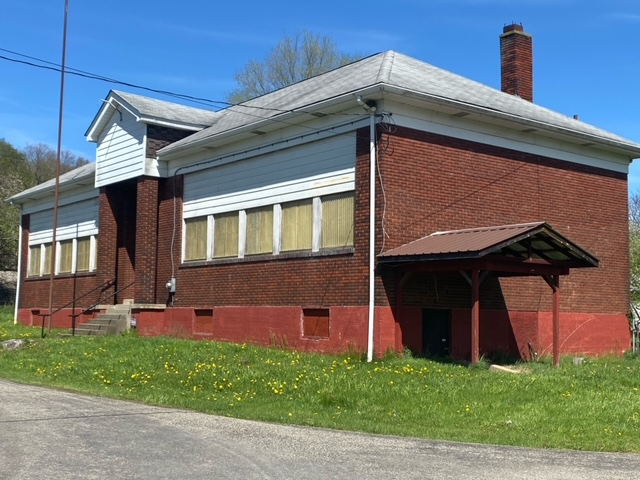
The former elementary school in Renfrew (2021)
