= Frank Levinson =

American entrepreneur and investor

Frank H. Levinson is an American entrepreneur and investor. Levinson is best known for being co-founder (with Jerry S. Rawls) of Finisar Corporation.

Levinson holds a BS in physics from Butler University, and a PhD in astronomy from the University of Virginia.

Levinson is currently the managing director of the early stage fund and incubator Small World Group, and a partner at the venture capital fund Phoenix Venture Partners.
