= The Rawls Course =

Home of the Texas Tech Red Raiders golf teams

Coordinates: 33.600°N 101.893°W

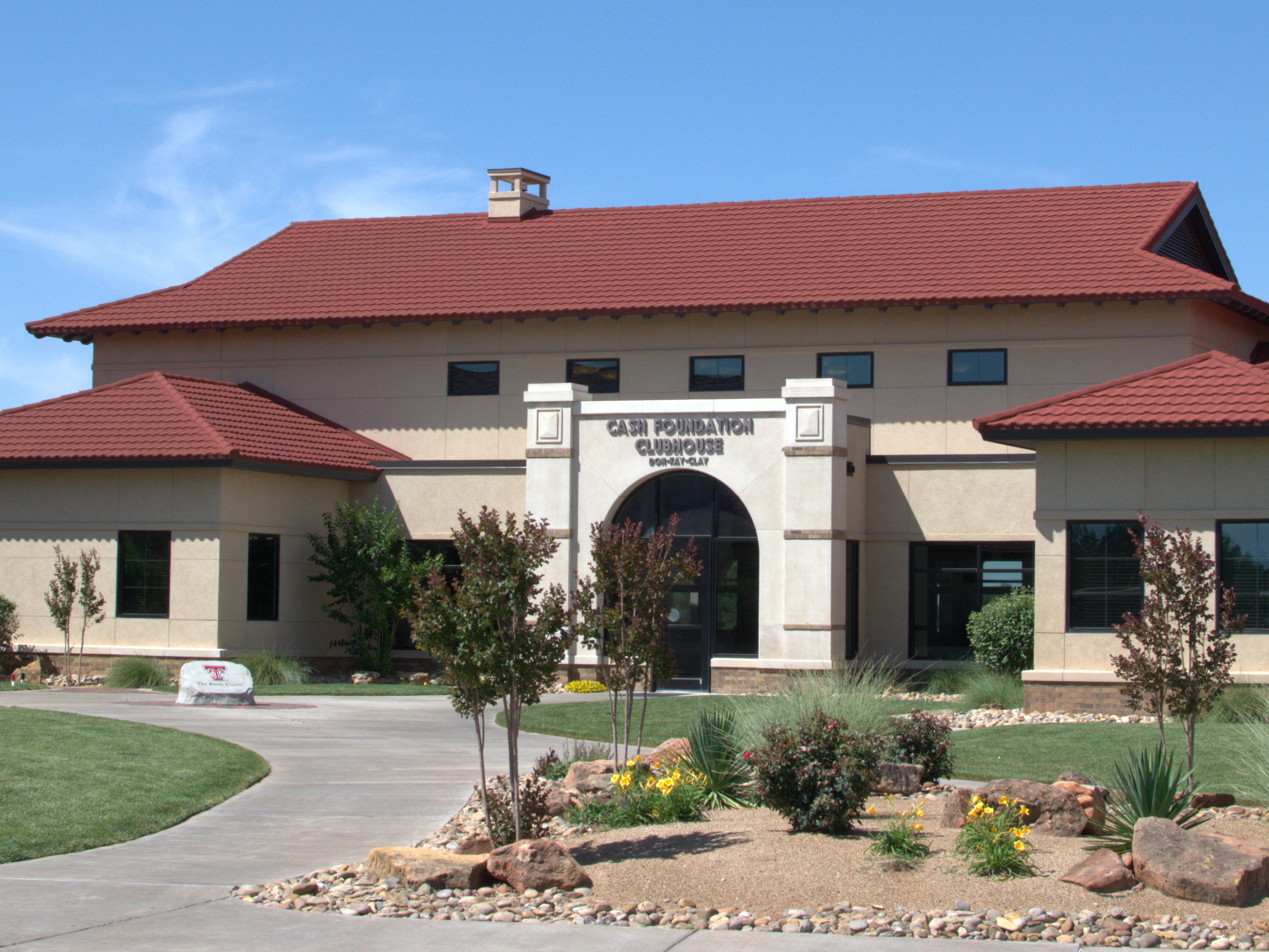
- The Cash Foundation Clubhouse
- Interactive map of The Rawls Course

Club information
- Location: Lubbock, Texas, U.S.
- Established: 2003
- Owner: Texas Tech University
- Operator: Texas Tech University
- Tota holes: 18
- Website: www.therawlscourse.com
- Designed by: Tom Doak
- Par: 72
- Length: 7,207 yards
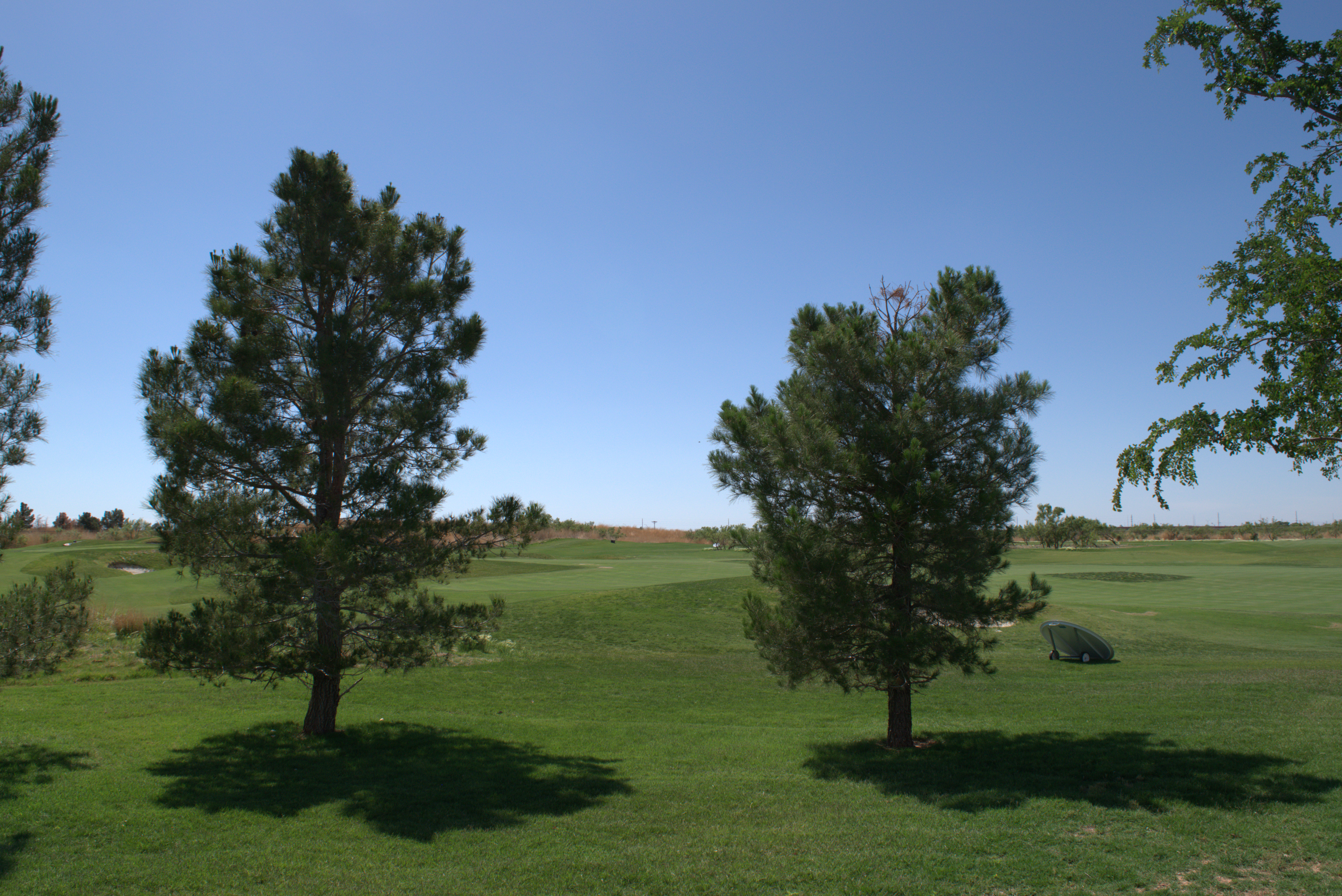
- Texas Tech Red Raiders golf team practice area

The Rawls Course, located in Lubbock, Texas, United States, is the home of the Texas Tech Red Raiders golf teams. It is an NCAA championship course constructed through a major gift from Jerry S. Rawls and supported by revenue from students, faculty, staff, donors, and the general public.

== Design ==
The Rawls Course was designed by Tom Doak of Renaissance Golf Design, Inc., Traverse City, Michigan. Starting from just a cotton field, the course was created to imitate the land east and south of Lubbock, where the Great Plains suddenly begin falling into the valleys and canyons that lead to the Caprock region. Lubbock's strong prevailing winds figured prominently in the course's final design.

== Recognition ==
Turfnet magazine ranked The Rawls Course the third best collegiate course in the United States. Golfweek recognized is as the fourth best collegiate golf course in the nation and, in 2012 and 2013, as the No. 2 course in the state of Texas.

Golf Magazine ranked it as the second most affordable U.S. course and placed it twenty-third on their list of top 50 golf courses in the nation for $50 or less. Golf Digest ranked it at No. 2 among affordable public courses. It also ranked it 19th overall for courses in the state of Texas.

== Improvements ==
In 2012, Texas Tech opened a $3.7 million clubhouse at The Rawls Course. The structure includes a public area as well as separate, private facilities for the university's golf teams.

== Events ==
- NCAA Division I Men's Golf Regional: 2015
- NCAA Division I Women's Golf Regional: 2005, 2017, 2025
- NJCAA Division I Men's Golf Championship: 2013, 2018
