= David B. Douthett =

American politician

Member of the Pennsylvania House of Representatives from the Butler County At-Large district
- In office December 1, 1892 – November 30, 1896

Personal details
- Born: October 12, 1840 Penn Township, Butler County, Pennsylvania
- Died: December 13, 1927 (aged 87) Wilkinsburg, Pennsylvania
- Party: Republican
- Education: Witherspoon Institute (Butler, Pennsylvania)

Military service
- Allegiance: United States
- Branch/service: 102nd Pennsylvania Infantry
- Rank: Private
- Battles/wars: American Civil War; Battle of Antietam; Battle of Gettysburg; Battle of the Wilderness (WIA)

David Black Douthett (October 12, 1840 – December 13, 1927) was an American educator, farmer, and politician who served in the Pennsylvania House of Representatives from 1892 to 1896, representing Butler County.

== Biography ==
Douthett was born in Penn Township, Butler County, Pennsylvania, on October 12, 1840, to Joseph Douthett (1807–1884) and Rebecca Douthett (née Magee; 1803–1885). He was educated at the Witherspoon Institute in Butler, Pennsylvania, and subsequently taught school from 1857 until 1861, when he joined the Pennsylvania Volunteer Infantry. Douthett was a private in Company H of the 102nd Pennsylvania Infantry Regiment from 1861 until 1865, during the American Civil War; Douthett's regiment participated in the Battle of Antietam and the Battle of Gettysburg, among others, as well as the Battle of the Wilderness early in Ulysses S. Grant's Overland Campaign, where Douthett was wounded. After the war, he was engaged in the farming and mercantile businesses and served in local offices including justice of the peace for ten years, postmaster of Brownsdale in Butler County for three terms, twelve years as a school director in Butler County, and as a gubernatorially-appointed delegate to the Farmers' National Congress in 1891.

A Republican, Douthett was elected to the Pennsylvania House of Representatives to represent Butler County in 1892, for the 1893–94 session, and was subsequently re-elected in 1894 for the 1895–96 session. Douthett did not seek a third term in 1896, instead retiring from the House to Wilkinsburg, Pennsylvania, where he served as a member of borough council. He died on December 13, 1927, in Wilkinsburg, and was interred at Brownsdale Cemetery in Butler County.

Douthett was a cousin of Adam M. Douthett, who also served in the Pennsylvania House of Representatives, as well as James Douthett Magee, the founding burgess of Valencia, Pennsylvania.
