= Coherent, Inc. =

American technology company

- Company type: Subsidiary
- Traded as: Nasdaq: COHR
- Industry: Industrial and fiber laser equipment
- Founded: 1966; 60 years ago, in Palo Alto, California
- Founder: James Hobart
- Headquarters: Santa Clara, California, U.S.
- Key people: Andreas W. Mattes (CEO)
- Revenue: US$5.595 billion (2025)
- Operating income: US$411 million (2020)
- Net income: US$-414 million (2020)
- Total assets: US$1.83 billion (2020)
- Total equity: US$927 million (2020)
- Number of employees: 4,875 (2020)
- Parent: II-VI Incorporated
- Subsidiaries: Coherent Auburn Group; Coherent Laser Group; Coherent Semiconductor Group; Coherent Lambda Physik
- Website: www.coherent.com

Coherent, Inc., headquartered in Santa Clara, California is an American company that develops, manufactures and supports laser equipment and related specialty components. Coherent was founded in May 1966 by physicist James Hobart and five cofounders. It went public in 1970. Over time, Coherent acquired other laser businesses and expanded to lasers for different industries and applications. From 2004 to 2021, it grew from $400 million to almost $2 billion in revenues, in part through a series of acquisitions. In 2022, II-VI Incorporated acquired Coherent, Inc. and took the name Coherent Corp.

== Corporate history ==
=== Origins and early funding ===
Coherent, Inc. was founded in May 1966 by six engineers in Palo Alto, California (Note: Sources conflict on the number of founders.) under the name Coherent Radiation. Coherent was initially funded by the founders with $10,000 from their personal savings. They released the first commercially available carbon dioxide laser that year. (Note: Sources conflict on whether Coherent was the very first. Founder James Hobart asserted the first commercial laser was actually created by PerkinElmer) The company made about $500,000 in sales its first year in operation, which grew to $6 million by 1970, after Coherent released its second generation product.

The Rockefellers invested $250,000 in 1967 and other private investors put in an additional $250,000 the next year. Then, Coherent filed an initial public offering in 1970.

=== 1970s – 1990s ===
Over time, Coherent expanded into lasers for consumer, medical, scientific, industrial, and other applications. In 1981, Coherent acquired the scientific division of Germany-based Lambda Physik, a manufacturer of excimer lasers. The following year, it acquired Germany-based Laser-Optronic GmbH and created a joint venture with Miyama and Co. in Japan.

Coherent became the largest laser equipment and parts manufacturer in the world, but its operations were still unprofitable. After founder James Hobart delegated management of the company, Coherent experienced numerous problems with defective products, delayed deliveries, and poor manufacturing efficiency. As a result of these problems, Hobart returned to the CEO position in 1988. He restructured the company and trained staff in manufacturing processes that were popularized in Japan, such as just-in-time manufacturing and continual improvement process. As a result of these changes, Coherent's productivity improved 60 percent, while its costs decreased 58 percent.

By the 1990s, medical lasers accounted for half of Coherent's revenues. In the mid-1990s, Coherent acquired Applied Laser Systems, ATx Telecom Systems, Inc., Uniphase Corporation, and 80 percent of Tutcore Oy, LTD. These acquired businesses formed Coherent's new semiconductor division. In July 1996, Bernard Couillaud was appointed chief executive officer and Hobart left the company the following year. Coherent then acquired a Palomar subsidiary focused on medical applications in April 1999 called Star Medical Technologies, Inc. for $65 million.

=== 2000s ===
In 2003, Coherent acquired Lambda Physik, which created ultraviolet lasers used in annealing in manufacturing flat-panel televisions. John Ambroseo became the CEO of Coherent in 2004. During his tenure, Coherent made a series of acquisitions that grew the company from $400 million to almost $2 billion in annual revenues. In 2006, Coherent acquired laser equipment manufacturer Excel Technology for $376 million.

Coherent purchased the German-based pulse laser company Lumera in 2012 for $52 million. Their lasers were primarily used in micromachining in industrial processes that use lasers to add very slight amounts of heat. In 2015, Coherent purchased Raydiance, who made lasers used in automotive and medical manufacturing, for $9.3 million. (Note: A different source claims $5 million rather than $9.3.) In early 2016, Coherent agreed to acquire the Germany-based materials processing competitor Rofin-Sinar for $942 million. Three years later, Coherent acquired Germany-based O.R. Lasertechnologie, which produced lasers for additive manufacturing.

Andreas W. Mattes was appointed CEO in April 2020.

In July 2022, II-VI Incorporated completed the acquisition of Coherent Inc., with the combined company named Coherent Corp.

== Products and services ==
Coherent provides laser-related equipment, components, and services used for a range of industries and applications. It operates numerous subsidiaries that focus on specific applications like engraving, drilling, or soldering. It manufactures things like lenses, mirrors, diodes, laser measurement equipment, industrial lasers, and lasers used in research labs.

== The Bernard J. Couillaud Prize ==
The OSA Foundation and Coherent Inc. partnered in 2017 to offer the annual Bernard J. Couillaud Prize, in honor of the former CEO of Coherent, who died in 2017. Couillaud, in collaboration with Nobel Prize Laureate Theodor W. Hänsch, developed the Hansch-Couillaud technique for laser frequency stabilization, and was instrumental in the development of dye, diode-pumped solid-state lasers, and Ti-sapphire lasers in his roles at Coherent. The Couillaud Prize is awarded to early-career professionals pursuing ultrafast laser research with an emphasis on solving real-world problems. The prize is a merit award of $20,500 with up to $5,000 in travel expense reimbursement to attend OSA scientific conferences.
