= Penn Township, Butler County, Pennsylvania =

Township in Pennsylvania, US

Coordinates: 40°47′N 79°56′W

- Township
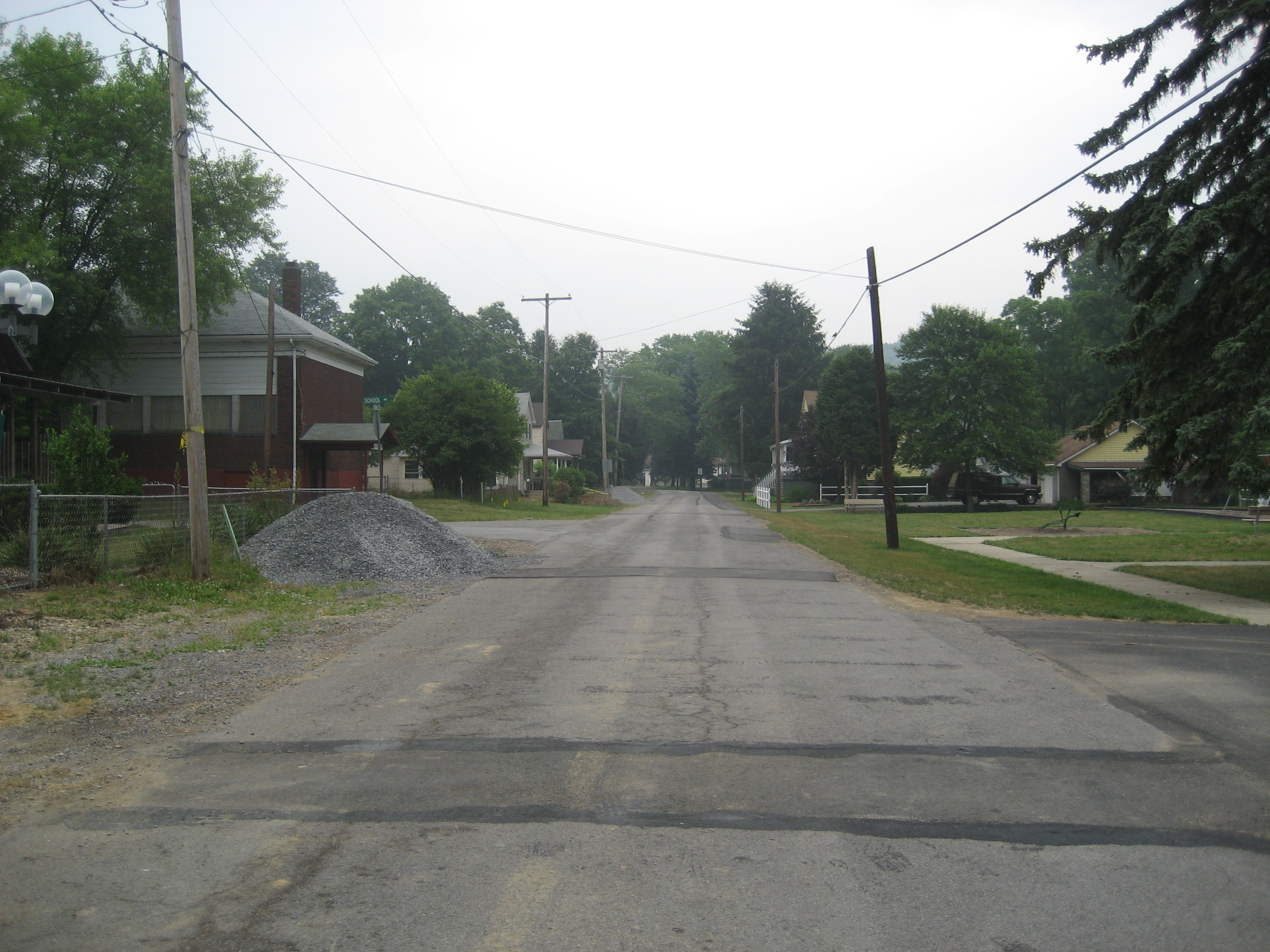
- Renfrew a small village in Penn Twp.

- Flag Seal Logo

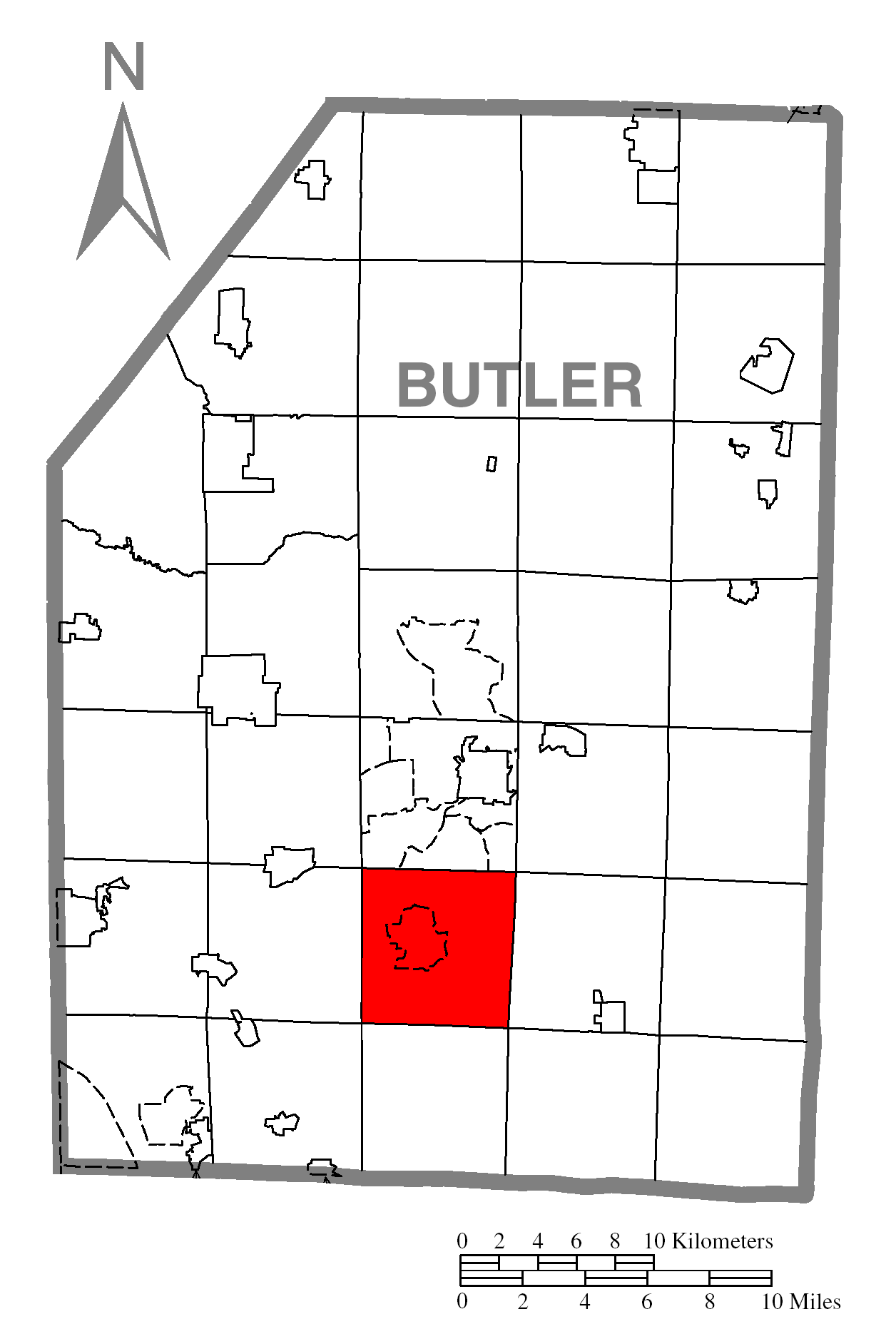
- Map of Butler County, Pennsylvania, highlighting Penn Township

- Map of Butler County, Pennsylvania
- Country: United States
- State: Pennsylvania
- County: Butler
- Settled: 1797
- Incorporated: 1854

Area
  - Total: 24.29 sq mi (62.91 km^{2})
  - Land: 24.27 sq mi (62.86 km^{2})
  - Water: 0.019 sq mi (0.05 km^{2})

Population (2020)
  - Total: 4,987 ▼
  - Estimate (2022): 4,916
  - Density: 203.2/sq mi (78.47/km^{2})
- Time zone: UTC-5 (Eastern (EST))
  - Summer (DST): UTC-4 (EDT)
- FIPS code: 42-019-58792
- Website: penntownship.org

Penn Township is a township that is located in Butler County, Pennsylvania, United States. The population was 4,987 at the time of the 2020 census.

The census-designated place of Nixon is in the township.

== Geography ==
Penn Township is located in southern Butler County and contains the unincorporated community of Nixon, a census-designated place. The unincorporated community of Renfrew is located in the northwestern corner of the township in the valley of Connoquenessing Creek.

According to the United States Census Bureau, the township has a total area of 24.3 square miles (62.9 km^{2}), of which 0.019 square miles (0.05 km^{2}), or 0.07%, is water.

== Demographics ==
Historical population
Census	Pop.	Note	%±
2010	5,071		—
2020	4,987		−1.7%
2022 (est.)	4,916		−1.4%
U.S. Decennial Census

As of the 2000 census, there were 5,210 people, 1,896 households, and 1,469 families residing in the township. The population density was 215.8 inhabitants per square mile (83.3/km^{2}). There were 1,980 housing units at an average density of 82.0 per square mile (31.7/km^{2}). The racial makeup of the township was 98.75% White, 0.25% African American, 0.06% Native American, 0.54% Asian, 0.04% Pacific Islander, 0.04% from other races, and 0.33% from two or more races. Hispanic or Latino of any race were 0.42% of the population.

There were 1,896 households, out of which 35.1% had children under the age of 18 living with them, 66.0% were married couples living together, 8.2% had a female householder with no husband present, and 22.5% were non-families. 19.3% of all households were made up of individuals, and 7.4% had someone living alone who was 65 years of age or older. The average household size was 2.68 and the average family size was 3.09.

In the township the population was spread out, with 25.7% under the age of 18, 5.8% from 18 to 24, 28.0% from 25 to 44, 26.6% from 45 to 64, and 13.8% who were 65 years of age or older. The median age was 40 years. For every 100 females, there were 101.9 males. For every 100 females age 18 and over, there were 97.0 males.

The median income for a household in the township was $50,025, and the median income for a family was $54,654. Males had a median income of $39,512 versus $26,716 for females. The per capita income for the township was $24,396. About 4.9% of families and 6.9% of the population were below the poverty line, including 9.1% of those under age 18 and 6.7% of those age 65 or over.

== Transportation ==
Pittsburgh-Butler Regional Airport (a.k.a. K. W. Scholter Field) is in the township.

== Education ==
The township is in the Knoch School District (formerly the South Butler County School District).

== Notable person ==
- David B. Douthett, member of the Pennsylvania House of Representatives (1892–1896)
