= Nixon, Pennsylvania =

Unincorporated community in Pennsylvania, US

- Census-designated place
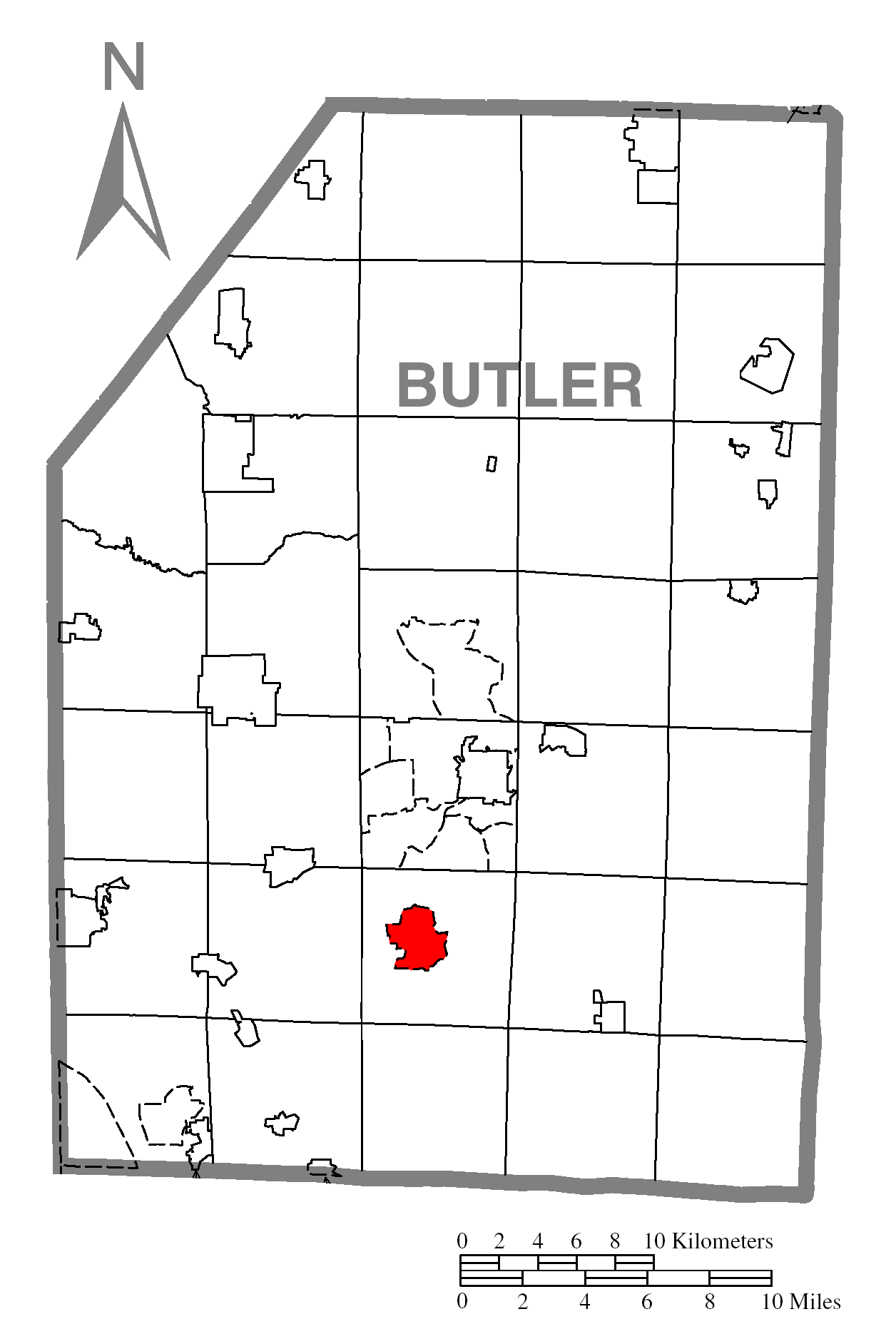
- Location within Butler County

- Location within the U.S. state of Pennsylvania Nixon (the United States)
- Coordinates: 40°47′8″N 79°56′17″W
- Country: United States
- State: Pennsylvania
- County: Butler
- Township: Penn

Area
  - Total: 2.70 sq mi (6.99 km^{2})
  - Land: 2.69 sq mi (6.97 km^{2})
  - Water: 0.012 sq mi (0.03 km^{2})
- Elevation: 1,240 ft (380 m)

Population (2020)
  - Total: 1,393
  - Density: 517.7/sq mi (199.89/km^{2})
- Time zone: UTC-5 (Eastern (EST))
  - Summer (DST): UTC-4 (EDT)
- FIPS code: 42-54552

Nixon is a census-designated place (CDP) in Penn Township, Butler County, Pennsylvania, United States. The population was 1,373 at the 2010 census.

== Geography ==
Nixon is located in Penn Township at 40°47′8″N 79°56′17″W (40.785683, −79.937926). Pennsylvania Route 8 passes through the CDP, leading north 6 miles (10 km) to Butler and south 26 miles (42 km) to downtown Pittsburgh.

According to the United States Census Bureau, the CDP has a total area of 2.7 square miles (7.0 km^{2}), of which 0.012 square miles (0.03 km^{2}), or 0.36%, is water.

== Demographics ==
Historical population
Census	Pop.	Note	%±
2020	1,393		—
U.S. Decennial Census

As of the 2000 census, there were 1,404 people, 508 households, and 419 families residing in the CDP. The population density was 526.7 inhabitants per square mile (203.4/km^{2}). There were 529 housing units at an average density of 198.4 per square mile (76.6/km^{2}). The racial makeup of the CDP was 98.08% White, 0.28% African American, 1.35% Asian, 0.07% from other races, and 0.21% from two or more races. Hispanic or Latino of any race were 0.78% of the population.

There were 508 households, out of which 34.4% had children under the age of 18 living with them, 74.0% were married couples living together, 5.5% had a female householder with no husband present, and 17.5% were non-families. 15.4% of all households were made up of individuals, and 7.5% had someone living alone who was 65 years of age or older. The average household size was 2.67 and the average family size was 2.98.

In the CDP, the population was spread out, with 24.1% under the age of 18, 4.4% from 18 to 24, 26.0% from 25 to 44, 28.4% from 45 to 64, and 17.1% who were 65 years of age or older. The median age was 43 years. For every 100 females, there were 110.5 males. For every 100 females age 18 and over, there were 105.0 males.

The median income for a household in the CDP was $58,864, and the median income for a family was $65,759. Males had a median income of $48,550 versus $29,423 for females. The per capita income for the CDP was $27,269. About 3.3% of families and 3.4% of the population were below the poverty line, including none of those under age 18 and 14.6% of those age 65 or over.

== Education ==
The CDP is in the Knoch School District (formerly the South Butler County School District).
