= Coherent Corp. =

U.S. technology company

- Formerly: II-VI Incorporated (1971-2022)
- Company type: Public
- Traded as: NYSE: COHR; S&P 500 component
- Industry: optical devices; semiconductor industry
- Founded: 1971; 55 years ago
- Founders: Carl Johnson; James Hawkey
- Headquarters: Saxonburg, Pennsylvania, U.S.
- Number of locations: 130 (2022)
- Key people: Jim Anderson (CEO)
- Revenue: ▲US$5.81 billion (2025)
- Operating income: ▲US$290 million (2025)
- Net income: ▲US$49.4 million (2025)
- Total assets: ▲US$14.9 billion (2025)
- Total equity: ▲US$5.64 billion (2025)
- Number of employees: 30,216 (2025)
- Website: coherent.com
- Footnotes / references Financials as of June 30, 2025.

Coherent Corp. (formerly II-VI Incorporated) is an American manufacturer of optical materials and semiconductors. As of 2023, the company had 26,622 employees. Its stock is listed on the New York Stock Exchange under the ticker symbol COHR. In 2022, II-VI acquired laser manufacturer Coherent, Inc., and adopted its name.

== History ==
Coherent was founded as II-VI Incorporated in 1971 by Carl Johnson and James Hawkey. The name "II-VI" is a reference to the groups II and VI in the periodic table, since the company started its business by producing cadmium telluride (cadmium belongs to group II and tellurium belongs to group VI). The company's first products included lenses, windows, and mirrors for CO_{2} lasers.

The company held its initial public offering in 1987. According to Carl Johnson, the funds raised by the IPO allowed II-VI to expand its zinc selenide manufacturing capacity.

In the 1990s, the company began to grow both on its own and through acquisitions. It purchased Litton Systems' silicon carbide group from Northrop Grumman in the 1990s, Virgo Optics in 1995, and Lightning Optical Corporation in 1996, among others. The combination of Virgo and Lightning created II-VI's VLOC division for developing one-micron solid-state lasers. Acquisitions in the 2000s have included Laser Power Optics in 2000; Marlow Industries in 2004; HIGHYAG (75% in 2007 and the remaining 25% in 2013); Photop Technologies in 2010; Oclaro's Santa Rosa, California, optics coating facility in 2012; Anadigics and EpiWorks in 2016; and Integrated Photonics in 2017. The acquisition of Avalon Photonics, Anadigics, and EpiWorks allowed II-VI to increase its production of vertical-cavity surface-emitting lasers (VCSELs), important to 3D sensing technology; and the acquisition of Finisar Corporation in 2019 brought to II-VI Finisar's high volume 3DS VCSELs indium phosphide (InP) platform and its experience in integrating InP lasers with optics and electronics in transceivers. Acquisitions of INNOViON, Ascatron, and some of GE's patents have expanded its business in silicon carbide substrates. In 2022, II-VI acquired laser manufacturer Coherent, Inc.. and took the name Coherent Corp.

Carl Johnson served as II-VI's first CEO from 1985 to 2007. He stepped down as CEO in 2007 and was named chairman of the board, a position he held until 2014. Johnson was succeeded as CEO by Francis Kramer, who had been president since 1985. Kramer followed Johnson as chair in 2014, in addition to his duties as CEO, and continued as chair in 2016 when Vincent D. (Chuck) Mattera, Jr., became the company's third CEO. In November 2021, Kramer transitioned from chair to Chair Emeritus, and Mattera was named chair and CEO. In February 2024, Coherent announced that Mattera would retire, remaining in place until a successor is named. Jim Anderson was named CEO in early June 2024. He was formerly with Lattice Semiconductor.

=== CEO salary ===
In May 2025, Barron's reported "the highest-paid CEO of 2024 wasn’t Jensen Huang, or Tim Cook, or even Elon Musk. Instead, it was James Anderson, the newly appointed CEO of Coherent."

== Locations and facilities ==
Coherent Corp. is headquartered in Saxonburg, Pennsylvania, located north of Pittsburgh in Butler County. The company has R&D, manufacturing, sales, service, and distribution facilities in 130 locations worldwide.

The Saxonburg headquarters site was once the property of KDKA, the world's first commercially licensed radio station, and some of the original structures are still there. In the 1940s, the site was expanded by the Carnegie Institute of Technology and the U.S. Nuclear Regulatory Commission to become a 400 MeV synchrocyclotron research facility. II-VI acquired the property around 1978 and has further expanded the facility over the years.
