= Winfield Township, Pennsylvania =

Township in Pennsylvania, US

Coordinates: 40°46′17″N 79°45′29″W

- Township
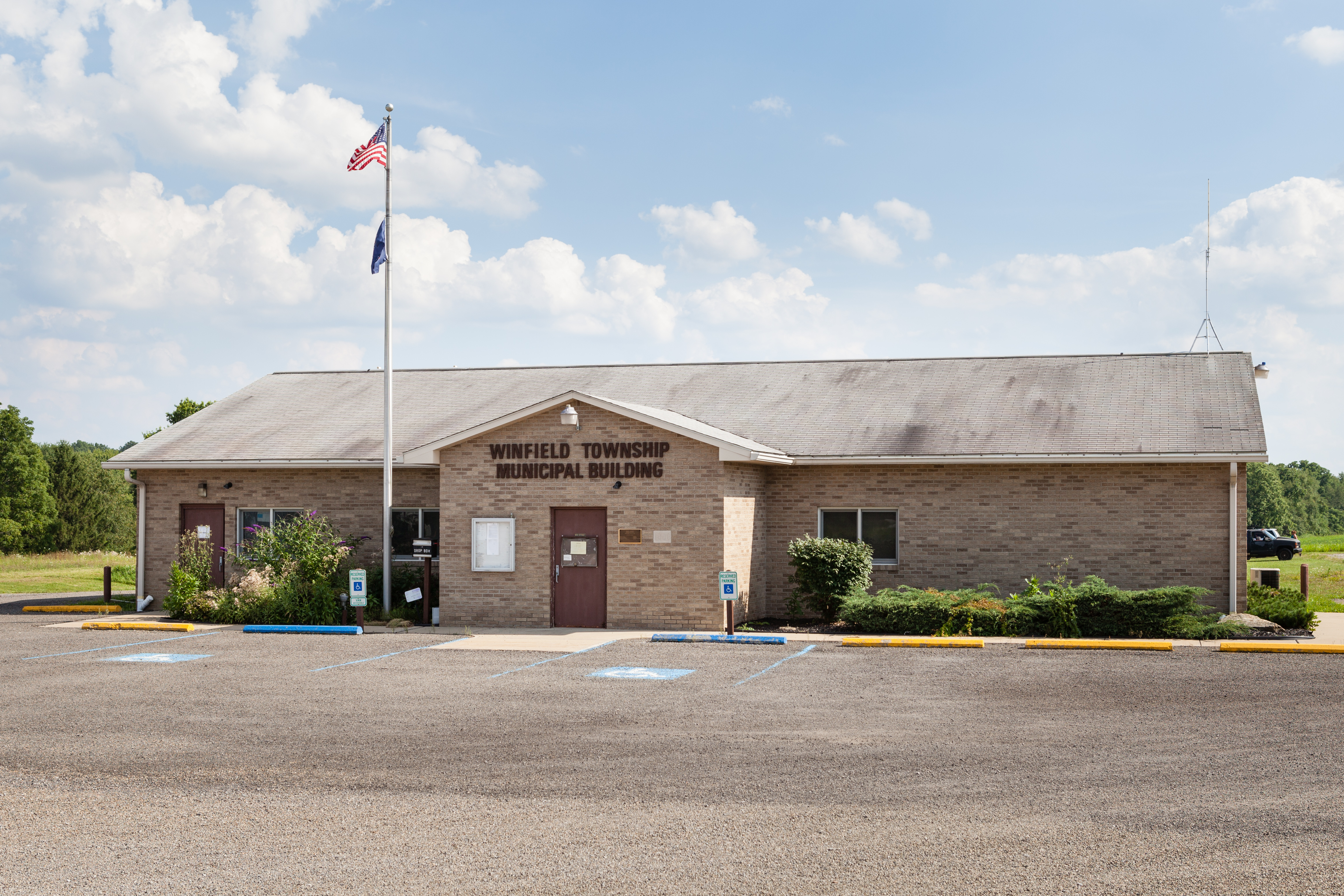
- Municipal Building, 194 Brose Road, Cabot, PA 16023

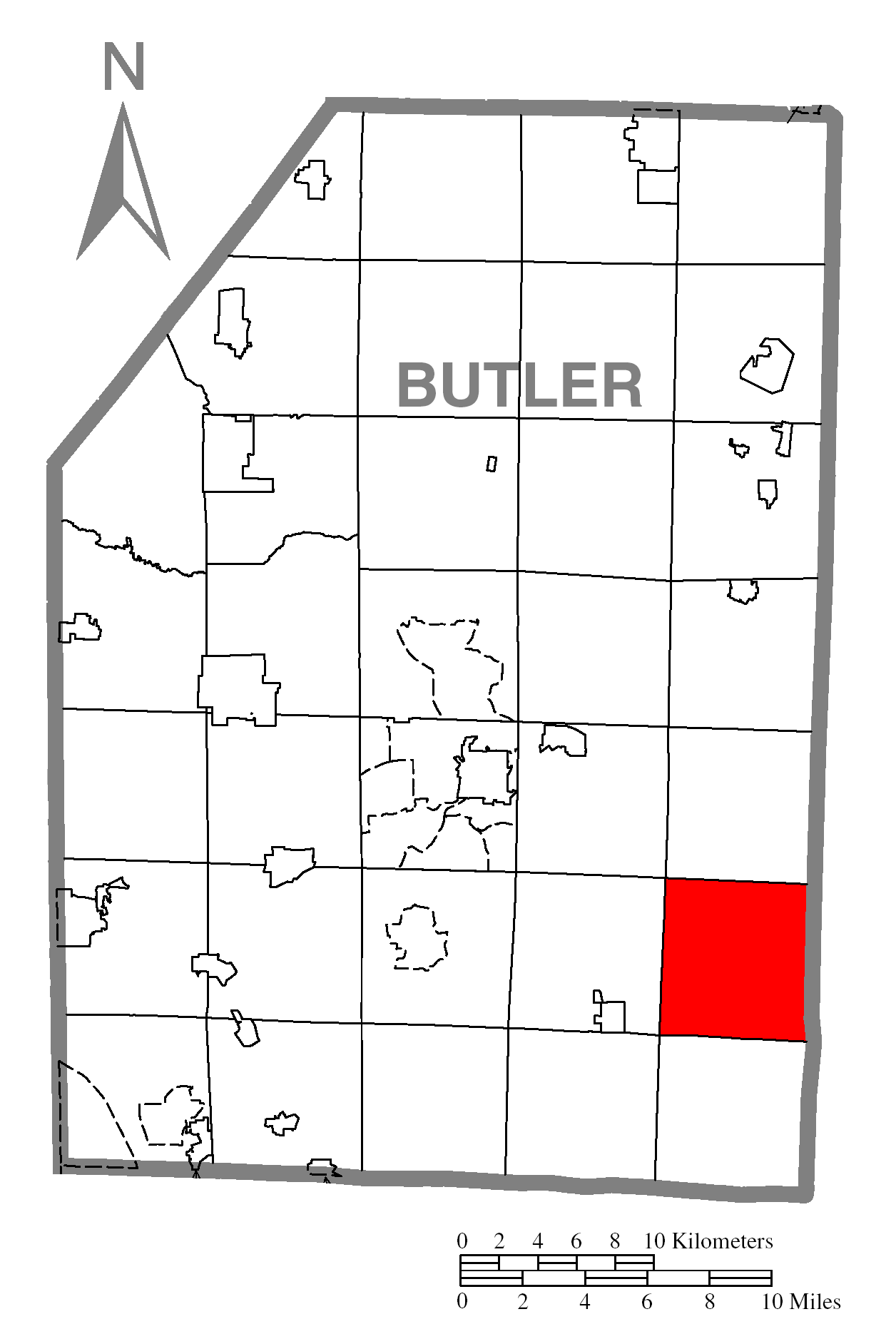
- Map of Butler County, Pennsylvania, highlighting Winfield Township

- Map of Butler County, Pennsylvania
- Country: United States
- State: Pennsylvania
- County: Butler
- Settled: 1796
- Incorporated: 1854

Area
  - Total: 24.07 sq mi (62.33 km^{2})
  - Land: 24.07 sq mi (62.33 km^{2})
  - Water: 0 sq mi (0.00 km^{2})

Population (2020)
  - Total: 3,365 ▼
  - Estimate (2022): 3,305
  - Density: 143.5/sq mi (55.41/km^{2})
- Time zone: UTC-5 (Eastern (EST))
  - Summer (DST): UTC-4 (EDT)
- FIPS code: 42-019-85784
- Website: www.winfieldpa.gov

Winfield Township is a township in Butler County, Pennsylvania, United States. The population was 3,365 at the 2020 census.

== History ==
During its early years, Winfield Township was an agricultural and mining community in Butler County near the community of Cabot.

It was established in 1796.

== Geography ==
Winfield Township is located in southeastern Butler County, along the Armstrong County line. It includes the unincorporated communities of Cabot, Lernerville, Marwood, West Winfield, and Dennys Mills.

According to the United States Census Bureau, the township has a total area of 24.1 square miles (62.3 km^{2}), all land.

== Demographics ==
Historical population
Census	Pop.	Note	%±
2010	3,535		—
2020	3,365		−4.8%
2022 (est.)	3,305		−1.8%
U.S. Decennial Census

As of the 2000 census, there were 3,585 people, 1,335 households, and 1,010 families residing in the township.

The population density was 146.8 inhabitants per square mile (56.7/km^{2}). There were 1,381 housing units at an average density of 56.6 per square mile (21.9/km^{2}).

The racial makeup of the township was 99.08% White, 0.17% African American, 0.17% Native American, 0.08% Asian, 0.03% Pacific Islander, 0.17% from other races, and 0.31% from two or more races. Hispanic or Latino of any race were 0.28% of the population.

There were 1,335 households, out of which 33.2% had children under the age of 18 living with them, 65.5% were married couples living together, 6.4% had a female householder with no husband present, and 24.3% were non-families. 20.8% of all households were made up of individuals, and 12.5% had someone living alone who was 65 years of age or older.

The average household size was 2.63 and the average family size was 3.05.

Within the township, the population was spread out, with 25.1% under the age of 18, 6.0% from 18 to 24, 28.8% from 25 to 44, 22.4% from 45 to 64, and 17.8% who were 65 years of age or older. The median age was 40 years.

For every 100 females there were 95.6 males. For every 100 females age 18 and over, there were 91.4 males.

The median income for a household in the township was $42,180, and the median income for a family was $47,442. Males had a median income of $35,946 compared with that of $20,862 for females.

The per capita income for the township was $17,338.

Approximately 4.6% of families and 6.0% of the population were living below the poverty line, including 7.5% of those under age 18 and 9.6% of those age 65 or over.

== Education ==
The township is in the Knoch School District (formerly the South Butler County School District).
