= Finisar =

Optical communications manufacturing company

Finisar Corporation
- Company type: Subsidiary
- Traded as: Nasdaq: FNSR
- Founded: April 1987; 38 years ago
- Founders: Frank Levinson; Jerry Rawls
- Headquarters: Sunnyvale, California
- Products: Optical communication components
- Revenue: US$1.28 billion (2019)
- Number of employees: 13,000 (2019)
- Parent: Coherent Corp.
- Website: finisar.com

Finisar Corporation is a manufacturer of optical communication components and subsystems. The company was founded in April 1987 by Frank Levinson and Jerry Rawls in Menlo Park, California. In November 1999, it went public via an initial public offering. In 2008 Finisar merged with Optium Corporation. In September 2019, Finisar was acquired by II-VI Incorporated for US$3.2 billion.

Finisar's products include optical transceivers, optical engines, active optical cables, optical components, optical instrumentation, ROADM & wavelength management, optical amplifiers, and RF-over-Fiber. Their products enable high-speed voice, video, and data communications for networking, storage, wireless, and cable TV applications.

== Partnerships ==
Apple Inc. announced a new partnership with Finisar in December 2017. The planned investment of $390 million will support Finisar's increase production of its R&D spending and high-volume production of vertical-cavity surface-emitting lasers that power some of Apple's features such as the Face ID. The plant, supporting more than 500 jobs, is located in Sherman, Texas.
