= Jerry S. Rawls =

American businessman

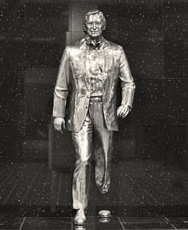
Statue of Jerry S. Rawls at Texas Tech University's Rawls College of Business

Jerry S. Rawls is an American businessman and philanthropist. He is the co-founder and chairman of Finisar.

== Biography ==
=== Early life ===
Jerry Rawls was born in Houston, Texas, and graduated from Bellaire High School in Houston in 1962. He earned his Bachelor of Science Degree in Mechanical Engineering from Texas Tech University in 1967. While at Texas Tech, he played freshman basketball, was an officer of the Phi Gamma Delta fraternity, and was a member of several other student organizations. He went on to earn a Master of Science Degree in Industrial Administration from the Krannert School of Management at Purdue University in 1968.

=== Career ===
He joined Raychem Corporation, a materials science and engineering company in Menlo Park, California and began a twenty-year career with them. He served in various capacities including National Sales Manager and Manager of Product Marketing. During his last six years there, he was General Manager of two divisions.

In 1988, he co-founded Finisar Corporation, a fiber optics company, with Frank H. Levinson. The goal for Finisar was to build cost effective gigabit optical transceivers to provide the optical input and output for high-speed computer networks. In 1992, Finisar proposed using multi-mode optics to dramatically lower the cost of gigabit optical links in data centers. Finisar's proposal for gigabit multimode optics was adopted by the ANSI committee as the basis for today's Fibre Channel Standard and later by the IEEE as the Gigabit Ethernet Standard.

In 1999 the company went public and raised $149.3 million. By the close of trading on the first day Finisar stock rose 373%, making Finisar the seventh largest first day gainer in the history of Wall Street at that time. The company now employs 9,000 people and has facilities and operations in California as well as in Dallas, Philadelphia, Boston, Champaign-Urbana, Malaysia, Singapore, Shanghai, Shenzhen, Sydney, Tel Aviv, Sweden, Denmark, India and Korea.

Forbes included Jerry in one of its lists of Corporate America's 500 Most Powerful People.

=== University donations ===
The Rawls College of Business and The Rawls Course at Texas Tech University are named for him. On October 2, 2003, Rawls Hall at Purdue University was also named in honor of Rawls.
