= Saxonburg, Pennsylvania =

Borough in Pennsylvania, US

- Borough
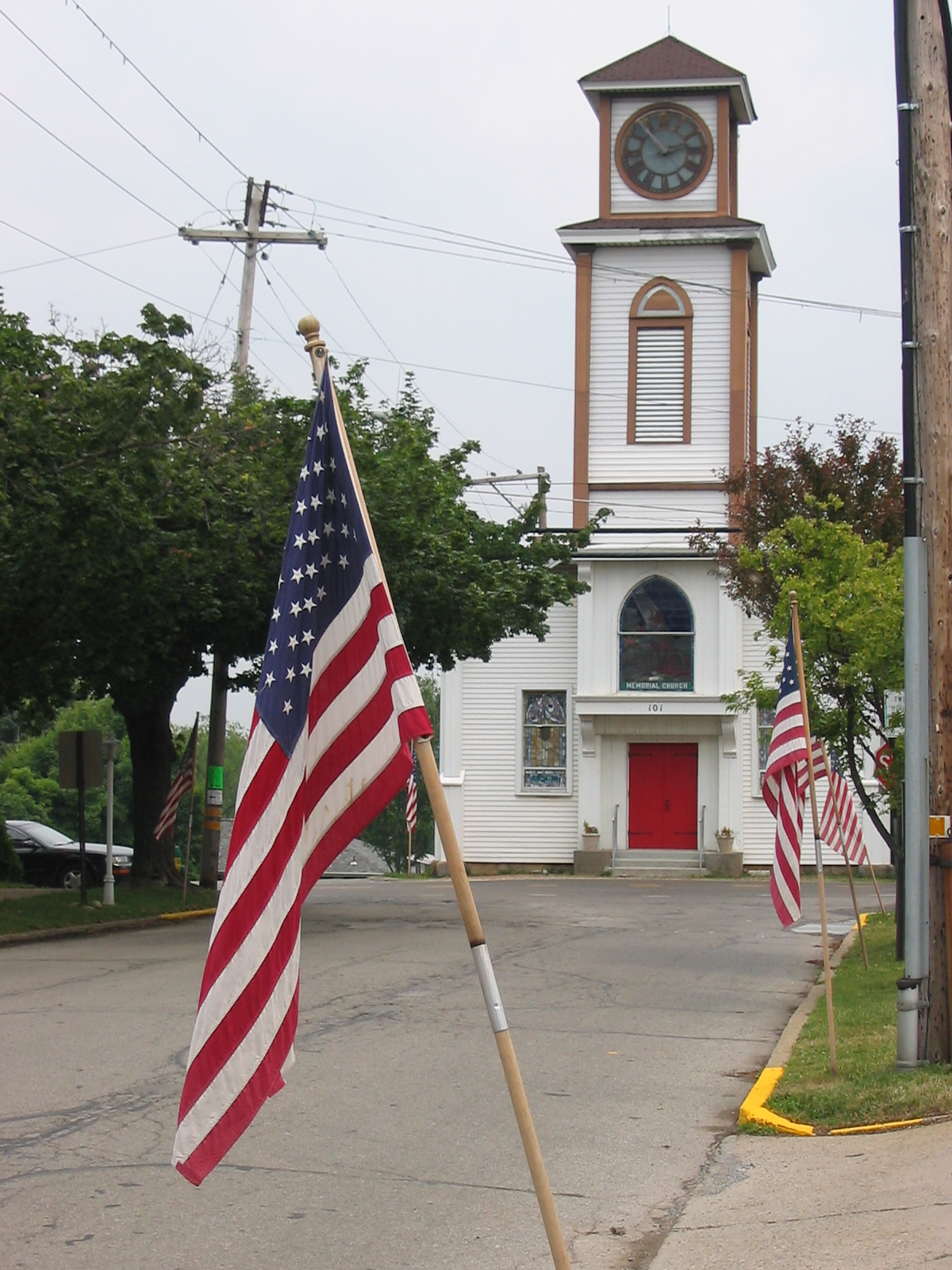
- Saxonburg Memorial Church

- Flag Seal

- Location of Saxonburg in Butler County, Pennsylvania

- Location within Pennsylvania
- Coordinates: 40°45′15″N 79°48′56″W
- Country: United States
- State: Pennsylvania
- County: Butler
- Settled: 1832
- Incorporated: 1846

Government
  - Type: Borough Council

Area
  - Total: 0.91 sq mi (2.35 km^{2})
  - Land: 0.91 sq mi (2.35 km^{2})
  - Water: 0 sq mi (0.00 km^{2})

Population (2020)
  - Total: 1,426
  - Density: 1,573.1/sq mi (607.39/km^{2})
- Time zone: UTC-5 (Eastern (EST))
  - Summer (DST): UTC-4 (EDT)
- Zip Code: 16056
- Area codes: 724, 878
- FIPS code: 42-68056
- Website: www.saxonburgpa.com

Saxonburg is a borough in Butler County, Pennsylvania, United States. It is part of the Greater Pittsburgh area in Western Pennsylvania. It was founded in 1832 by F. Carl Roebling and his younger brother John as a German farming colony. As of the 2020 census, Saxonburg had a population of 1,426.

After Roebling returned to his engineering career, he developed his innovation of wire rope in a workshop here. He became known for his design of suspension bridges, including arguably his most famous one, the Brooklyn Bridge in New York.

== History ==
Founded in 1832 by Friedrich Carl Roebling and his younger brother John A. Roebling, the frontier farming community was initially called "Germania". This was changed to "Sachsenburg" and later anglicized to Saxonburg. Roebling had emigrated with his brother Carl and a group of pioneers from Prussia in 1831 to flee political unrest and oppression. (Although this is something that is doubted by David McCullough in his 1972 book The Great Bridge, writing, "He was seeking neither religious freedom nor release from the bondage of poverty. His quest was for something else.") The two men, along with a handful of a larger group who accompanied them on the trans-Atlantic journey, bought 1,582 acres (6.40 km^{2}) of land on October 28, 1831, from Mrs. Sarah Collins.

After a few years, Roebling left farming to return to his career as an engineer. He developed a way to produce wire rope or cable, and used it in several of his projects, beginning with an aqueduct. He produced the wire rope at a workshop on his property in Saxonburg. He designed several suspension bridges, including two in Pittsburgh and one in Philadelphia. His most famous is his Brooklyn Bridge in New York. The Roebling Museum in the borough maintains several artifacts of his notable career.

In November 1920, KDKA radio, regarded as the world's first commercial radio station, began broadcasting from East Pittsburgh. Later it relocated its transmitter in neighboring Clinton Township in Butler County. While the transmitter facility is no longer in Butler County, artifacts of it remain on display at the Saxonburg Museum, co-located with Roebling Park.

Saxonburg's radio history continues with an internet-based radio station. The station, originally known as saxonburgradio.com, has served the borough and surrounding southern Butler County with music and local news since October 25, 2015. The station, which had been privately owned, was gifted to the Knoch School District in June 2025. It also broadcast over the air on micropower levels throughout Saxonburg on AM 1620 and FM 100.3 under FCC Part 15 rules, but the AM transmission has since ceased. Today the station is simply known as Saxonburg Radio, but can be heard through the school district's website at knochsd.org

=== Nuclear lab ===
In 1946, Fred Seitz, head of the physics department at Carnegie Tech, recruited Ed Creutz, Jack Fox, Roger Sutton and Bert Corben to the university to develop an important nuclear physics research program. By June 6, 1946, they had built a leading-edge, 450 MeV proton synchrocyclotron at the Nuclear Research Center near Saxonburg, just south of the city limits. The research program flourished up to the mid-1970s. By then the accelerator had become obsolete and was dismantled. The site was converted to industrial purposes, and is now occupied by II-VI Corporation. As of 1997, only one or two of the original Nuclear Research Center buildings remained intact, including the original laboratory building.

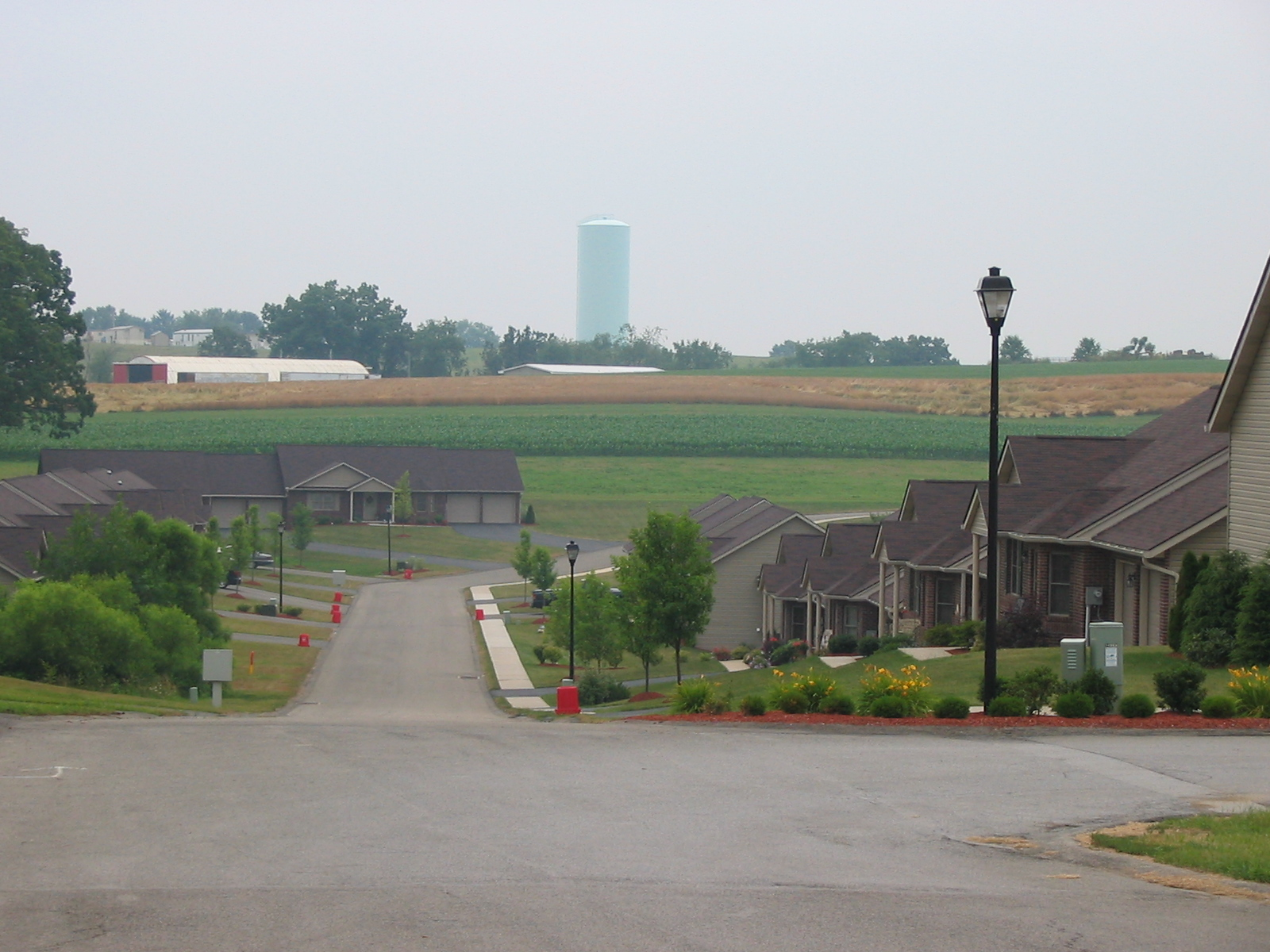
South Butler Street, off Main Street, Saxonburg

=== Murder of Police Chief Adams ===
On the afternoon of December 4, 1980, career criminal Donald Eugene Webb was the chief suspect in the murder of the borough police chief Gregory Adams at the Agway in Saxonburg. This was the second homicide in the borough's nearly 150-year history and received national attention, especially as Webb was never apprehended. Webb was put on the FBI Most Wanted List, but was never captured. After the FBI found new evidence in her house in 2016, in July 2017, his wife Lillian Webb confessed to hiding her husband for 17 years, and led the FBI and police to his remains buried in the yard of her Massachusetts house. He died in 1999 after a series of strokes, at the approximate age of 68.

The first murder occurred in 1849. Christina Foertsch, sister of Albert and Wilbert Foertsch, killed Adele, Wilbert's three-year-old daughter, before killing herself.

=== First woman mayor ===
In November 2009, Jody Pflueger was elected as mayor as a write-in candidate, defeating the 12-year incumbent. She is both the city's first Democratic and first female mayor. While in office, Mayor Pflueger had the position of Police Chief reinstated in the small city. Pflueger was succeeded by Pamela Bauman in 2013, who died in office. William Gillespie was elected in a special election to complete the remainder of Bauman's term. As of 2023, Gillespie remains in office.

== Geography ==
Saxonburg is located in southeastern Butler County at 40°45′15″N 79°48′56″W (40.754040, −79.815619). Butler, the county seat, is 9 miles (14 km) to the northwest, and Freeport, on the Allegheny River, is 10 miles (16 km) to the southeast.

According to the United States Census Bureau, Saxonburg has a total area of 0.89 square miles (2.3 km^{2}), all land.

== Demographics ==
Historical population
Census	Pop.	Note	%±
1870	295		—
1880	319		8.1%
1890	258		−19.1%
1900	307		19.0%
1910	345		12.4%
1920	319		−7.5%
1930	452		41.7%
1940	524		15.9%
1950	602		14.9%
1960	876		45.5%
1970	1,191		36.0%
1980	1,336		12.2%
1990	1,345		0.7%
2000	1,629		21.1%
2010	1,525		−6.4%
2020	1,426		−6.5%

As of the 2000 census, there were 1,629 people, 655 households, and 391 families residing in the borough. The population density was 1,852.8 inhabitants per square mile (715.4/km^{2}). There were 713 housing units at an average density of 811.0 per square mile (313.1/km^{2}). The racial makeup of the borough was 99.32% White, 0.25% African American, 0.31% from other races, and 0.12% from two or more races. Hispanic or Latino of any race were 1.53% of the population.

There were 655 households, out of which 22.7% had children under the age of 18 living with them, 47.8% were married couples living together, 10.4% had a female householder with no husband present, and 40.2% were non-families. 35.3% of all households were made up of individuals, and 17.3% had someone living alone who was 65 years of age or older. The average household size was 2.13 and the average family size was 2.75.

In the borough the population was spread out, with 16.8% under the age of 18, 5.9% from 18 to 24, 21.9% from 25 to 44, 21.0% from 45 to 64, and 34.4% who were 65 years of age or older. The median age was 50 years. For every 100 females, there were 72.4 males. For every 100 females age 18 and over, there were 69.0 males.

The median income for a household in the borough was $32,159, and the median income for a family was $41,875. Males had a median income of $37,500 versus $24,135 for females. The per capita income for the borough was $21,931. About 7.8% of families and 9.6% of the population were below the poverty line, including 13.6% of those under age 18 and 8.1% of those age 65 or over.

== Education ==
The borough is in the Knoch School District (formerly the South Butler County School District).

== Notable people ==
- Joby Harris (born 1975), designer and director.
- Michele McDonald (1952–2020), model and Miss USA 1971
- John A. Roebling (1806–1869), civil engineer who developed a way to manufacture wire rope or cable, and designed numerous suspension bridges (see Brooklyn Bridge)
- Washington Roebling (1837–1926), civil engineer and brevet colonel in the U.S. Army
