= List of places in Pennsylvania: C =

This list of cities, towns, unincorporated communities, counties, and other recognized places in the U.S. state of Pennsylvania also includes information on the number and names of counties in which the place lies, and its lower and upper zip code bounds, if applicable.

Name of place	Number of counties	Principal county	Lower zip code	Upper zip code
Cabel	1	Northumberland County		
Cable Hollow	1	Warren County	16345	
Cabot	1	Butler County	16023	
Cacoosing	1	Berks County	19608	
Cadis	1	Bradford County	18851	
Cadogan	1	Armstrong County	16212	
Cadogan Township	1	Armstrong County		
Caernarvon Township	1	Berks County		
Caernarvon Township	1	Lancaster County		
Cains	1	Lancaster County	17527	
Cairnbrook	1	Somerset County	15924	
Caldwell	1	Clinton County	17745	
Caledonia	1	Elk County	15868	
Caledonia Park	1	Franklin County	17222	
California	1	Bucks County	18951	
California	1	Montour County	17777	
California	1	Washington County	15419	
California Furnace	1	Westmoreland County		
Calkins	1	Wayne County	18443	
Callapoose	1	Wayne County	18444	
Callensburg	1	Clarion County	16213	
Callery	1	Butler County	16024	
Callimont	1	Somerset County	15552	
Caln	1	Chester County	19320	
Caln Meeting House	1	Chester County		
Caln Township	1	Chester County		
Calumet	1	Westmoreland County	15621	
Calumet-Norvelt	1	Westmoreland County		
Calvert	1	Lycoming County	17771	
Calvert Hills	1	Blair County	16601	
Calvin	1	Huntingdon County	16622	
Camargo	1	Lancaster County	17566	
Cambra	1	Luzerne County	18611	
Cambria City	1	Cambria County		
Cambria Township	1	Cambria County		
Cambridge	2	Chester County	19344	
Cambridge	2	Lancaster County	19344	
Cambridge Springs	1	Crawford County	16403	
Cambridge Township	1	Crawford County		
Camden Hill	1	Allegheny County	15122	
Cameron	1	Cameron County	15834	
Cameron	1	Northumberland County		
Cameron	1	Union County		
Cammal	1	Lycoming County	17723	
Camp Akiba	1	Monroe County	18354	
Campbells Mill	1	Indiana County		
Campbelltown	1	Lebanon County	17010	
Campbelltown	1	McKean County	16735	
Campbellville	1	Sullivan County		
Camp Curtin	1	Dauphin County	17110	
Camp Grove	1	Northumberland County	17830	
Camp Hill	1	Allegheny County	15106	
Camp Hill	1	Cumberland County	17011	
Camphill	1	Montgomery County		
Camp Jo-Ann	1	Westmoreland County	15668	
Camp Mystic	1	Erie County	16403	
Camp Perry	1	Mercer County	16114	
Campton	1	Allegheny County	15065	
Camptown	1	Bradford County	18815	
Canaan Grove	1	Lebanon County		
Canaan Township	1	Wayne County		
Canadensis	1	Monroe County	18325	
Canadohta Lake	1	Crawford County	16438	
Canal Center	1	Venango County		
Canal Township	1	Venango County		
Canan	1	Blair County		
Canan Station	1	Blair County	16601	
Candlebrook	1	Montgomery County	19406	
Candor	1	Washington County	15019	
Cannelton	1	Beaver County	16115	
Canoe Camp	1	Tioga County	16933	
Canoe Creek	1	Blair County	16648	
Canoe Furnace	1	Clarion County		
Canoe Ridge	1	Indiana County	15772	
Canoe Township	1	Indiana County		
Canonsburg	1	Washington County	15317	
Canton	1	Bradford County	17724	
Canton Township	1	Bradford County		
Canton Township	1	Washington County		
Canyon Vista	1	Sullivan County		
Caprivi	1	Cumberland County	17013	
Carbon	1	Bradford County		
Carbon	1	Carbon County	18071	
Carbon	1	Mercer County		
Carbon	1	Westmoreland County	15601	
Carbon Center	1	Butler County	16001	
Carbon Township	1	Huntingdon County		
Carbondale	1	Lackawanna County	18407	
Carbondale Township	1	Lackawanna County		
Cardale	1	Fayette County	15420	
Cardiff	1	Cambria County		
Cardington	1	Delaware County	19082	
Carley Brook	1	Wayne County		
Carlim	1	Blair County		
Carlisle	1	Cumberland County	17013	
Carlisle Barracks	1	Cumberland County	17013	
Carlisle Junction	1	Cumberland County		
Carlisle Springs	1	Cumberland County	17013	
Carlo	1	Elk County		
Carlson	1	Elk County		
Carlton	1	Mercer County	16311	
Carman	1	Elk County		
Carmichaels	1	Greene County	15320	
Carmona	1	Mercer County		
Carnegie	1	Allegheny County	15106	
Carney	1	Westmoreland County		
Carnot-Moon	1	Allegheny County	15108	
Carnwath	1	Clearfield County	16861	
Carpenter	1	Philadelphia County		
Carpenter Corner	1	Mercer County	16153	
Carpenter Hollow	1	Wyoming County		
Carpenter Town	1	Lackawanna County	18414	
Carpentertown	1	Westmoreland County	15666	
Carrick	1	Allegheny County		
Carrick Valley	1	Franklin County		
Carrier	1	Jefferson County	15864	
Carroll	1	Clinton County	17747	
Carroll Park	1	Columbia County	17815	
Carroll Park	1	Philadelphia County	19096	
Carroll Township	1	Perry County		
Carroll Township	1	Washington County		
Carroll Township	1	York County		
Carroll Valley	1	Adams County	17320	
Carrolltown	1	Cambria County	15722	
Carson	1	Allegheny County	15203	
Carson Valley	1	Blair County	16635	
Carsontown	1	Lycoming County	17776	
Carsonville	1	Dauphin County	17032	
Carter	1	Butler County		
Carter Camp	1	Potter County	16922	
Cartin	1	Dauphin County		
Cartwright	1	Elk County	15823	
Carver Court	1	Chester County	19320	
Carversville	1	Bucks County	18913	
Carverton	1	Luzerne County	18644	
Casanova	1	Centre County	16860	
Cascade Township	1	Lycoming County		
Casey Highlands	1	Bucks County		
Casey Tract	1	Bucks County	18954	
Casey Village	1	Bucks County		
Cashtown	1	Adams County	17310	
Cashtown	1	Franklin County	17201	
Cashtown-McKnightstown	1	Adams County		
Casparis	1	Fayette County		
Cass Township	1	Huntingdon County		
Cass Township	1	Schuylkill County		
Cassandra	1	Cambria County	15925	
Casselman	1	Somerset County	15557	
Cassville	1	Huntingdon County	16623	
Castanea	1	Clinton County	17726	
Castanea Township	1	Clinton County		
Caste Village	1	Allegheny County	15236	
Castile	1	Greene County		
Castle Fin	1	York County		
Castle Garden	1	Cameron County	15832	
Castle Rock	1	Delaware County	19073	
Castle Rocks	1	Clinton County		
Castle Shannon	1	Allegheny County	15234	
Castle Valley	1	Bucks County	18914	
Castlewood	1	Lawrence County	16101	
Castor	1	Philadelphia County	19149	
Cataract	1	Clearfield County	16871	
Catasauqua	1	Lehigh County	18032	
Catawissa	1	Columbia County	17820	
Catawissa Junction	1	Columbia County		
Catawissa Township	1	Columbia County		
Catfish	1	Clarion County		
Catharine Township	1	Blair County		
Cato	1	Centre County		
Cats Run Junction	1	Fayette County		
Cavettsville	1	Westmoreland County	15085	
Ceasetown	1	Luzerne County	18621	
Cecil	1	Washington County	15321	
Cecil Township	1	Washington County		
Cecil-Bishop	1	Washington County		
Cedar Brook-Melrose Park	1	Montgomery County	19117	
Cedar Cliff	1	Cumberland County		
Cedar Cliff Manor	1	Cumberland County	17011	
Cedar Grove	1	Philadelphia County		
Cedar Heights	1	Montgomery County	19428	
Cedar Hill	1	Mifflin County		
Cedar Hollow	1	Chester County	19355	
Cedar Knoll	1	Chester County	19320	
Cedar Lane	1	Lancaster County	17519	
Cedar Ledge	1	Bradford County	17724	
Cedar Pines	1	Lycoming County		
Cedar Ridge	1	Adams County	17350	
Cedar Run	1	Lycoming County	17727	
Cedar Springs	1	Clinton County	17751	
Cedarbrook	1	Montgomery County	19095	
Cedarbrook Hills	1	Montgomery County	19095	
Cedarhurst	1	Allegheny County	15243	
Cedars	1	Montgomery County	19423	
Cedarville	1	Chester County	19464	
Celia	1	Beaver County	16123	
Cementon	1	Lehigh County	18052	
Centennial	1	Adams County	17331	
Centennial	1	Centre County		
Centennial Hills	1	Bucks County	18974	
Center	1	Allegheny County	15239	
Center	1	Juniata County	17059	
Center	1	Perry County	17047	
Center City	1	Lycoming County	17701	
Center Hill	1	Armstrong County	16201	
Center Mills	1	Adams County	17304	
Center Moreland	1	Wyoming County	18657	
Center Point	1	Montgomery County		
Center Road	1	Crawford County	16424	
Center Square	1	Lancaster County		
Center Square	1	Montgomery County	19422	
Center Square	1	Perry County		
Center Square Greens	1	Montgomery County	19401	
Center Township	1	Beaver County		
Center Township	1	Butler County		
Center Township	1	Greene County		
Center Township	1	Indiana County		
Center Township	1	Snyder County		
Center Union	1	Huntingdon County	16652	
Center Valley	1	Armstrong County	16226	
Center Valley	1	Lehigh County	18034	
Centerport	1	Berks County	19516	
Centertown	1	Mercer County	16127	
Centerville	1	Bedford County	15522	
Centerville	1	Bradford County		
Centerville	1	Crawford County	16404	
Centerville	1	Lancaster County	17601	
Centerville	1	Perry County	17062	
Centerville	1	Washington County	15417	
Centerville	1	Westmoreland County	15479	15672
Centerville	1	York County	17327	
Central	1	Allegheny County	15132	
Central	1	Columbia County	17814	
Central	1	Washington County	15301	
Central	1	Westmoreland County	15688	
Central City	1	Centre County	16853	
Central City	1	Somerset County	15926	
Central Highlands	1	Allegheny County	15037	
Centralia	1	Columbia County	17927	
Central Manor	1	Lancaster County	17582	
Central Oak Heights	1	Union County		
Central Park	1	Allegheny County	15037	
Central Wharf	1	Allegheny County	15120	
Center Bridge	1	Bucks County	18938	
Centre	1	Juniata County	17059	
Centre	1	Perry County	17068	
Centre Hall	1	Centre County	16828	
Centre Hill	1	Centre County	16875	
Centre Township	1	Berks County		
Centre Township	1	Perry County		
Centre Township	1	Snyder County		
Center Valley	1	Lehigh County		
Centronia	1	Lehigh County		
Century	1	Fayette County	15417	
Cereal	1	Westmoreland County		
Ceres Township	1	McKean County		
Cessna	1	Bedford County	15522	
Cetronia	1	Lehigh County	18104	
Ceylon	1	Greene County	15320	
Chadds Ford	1	Delaware County	19317	
Chadds Ford Junction	1	Chester County		
Chadds Ford Township	1	Delaware County		
Chadville	1	Fayette County	15401	
Chaffee	1	Elk County		
Chain	1	Schuylkill County	17960	
Chain Bridge	1	Bucks County	18974	
Chaintown	1	Westmoreland County	15683	
Chalfant	1	Allegheny County	15112	
Chalfont	1	Bucks County	18914	
Chalkhill	1	Fayette County	15421	
Challenge	1	Elk County	15823	
Chalybeate	1	Bedford County	15522	
Chambersburg	1	Franklin County	17201	
Chambers Hill	1	Dauphin County	17111	
Chambers Mill	1	Washington County	15301	
Chambersville	1	Indiana County	15723	
Chamouni	1	Fayette County		
Champion	2	Allegheny County		
Champion	2	Washington County		
Champion	2	Fayette County	15622	
Champion	2	Westmoreland County	15622	
Chanceford Township	1	York County		
Chandler Plan	1	Armstrong County	16226	
Chandlers Valley	1	Warren County	16312	
Chaneysville	1	Bedford County	21530	
Chapel	1	Berks County	18070	
Chapel Downs	1	Allegheny County	15024	
Chapel Hill	1	Montgomery County	19006	
Chapman	1	Lehigh County	18090	
Chapman	1	Northampton County	18014	
Chapman	1	Snyder County	17864	
Chapman Lake	1	Lackawanna County	18433	
Chapman Quarries	1	Northampton County		
Chapman Township	1	Clinton County		
Chapman Township	1	Snyder County		
Chapmanville	1	Venango County		
Charleroi	1	Washington County	15022	
Charleston	1	Mercer County	16146	
Charleston	1	Tioga County	16901	
Charleston Township	1	Tioga County		
Charlestown	1	Armstrong County		
Charlestown	1	Chester County	19460	
Charlestown	1	Franklin County	17236	
Charlestown Township	1	Chester County		
Charlesville	1	Bedford County	15522	
Charlies Grove	1	Cambria County		
Charlottsville	1	Blair County	16686	
Charlton	1	Clinton County	17745	
Charlton	1	Dauphin County	17112	
Charmian	1	Franklin County	17214	
Charming Forge	1	Berks County		
Charnita	1	Adams County	17320	
Charteroak	1	Huntingdon County	16669	
Charter Oaks	1	Erie County	16509	
Charterwood	1	Allegheny County	15237	
Chartiers	1	Greene County		
Chartiers Terrace	1	Allegheny County	15106	
Chartiers Township	1	Washington County		
Chase	1	Luzerne County	18708	
Chatham	1	Chester County	19318	
Chatham Park	1	Delaware County	19083	
Chatham Run	1	Clinton County	17745	
Chatham Township	1	Tioga County		
Chatham Village	1	Delaware County	19083	
Chatwood	1	Chester County	19380	
Chauncey	1	Luzerne County	18651	
Cheat Haven	1	Fayette County		
Checkerville	1	Bradford County		
Chelsea	1	Delaware County	19061	
Chelten Avenue	1	Philadelphia County		
Cheltenham	1	Montgomery County	19012	
Cheltenham Township	1	Montgomery County	19012	
Chelten Hills	1	Montgomery County		
Chemical	1	Centre County		
Chemung	1	Lycoming County		
Cherokee Ranch	1	Berks County	19560	
Cherry City	1	Allegheny County	15223	
Cherry Corner	1	Clearfield County	15757	
Cherry Flats	1	Tioga County	16933	
Cherry Grove	1	Huntingdon County	17264	
Cherry Grove	1	Warren County	16313	
Cherry Grove Township	1	Warren County		
Cherry Hill	1	Erie County	16401	
Cherry Hill	1	Northampton County	18064	
Cherry Lane	1	Armstrong County	15613	
Cherry Mills	1	Sullivan County		
Cherry Ridge	1	Wayne County		
Cherry Ridge Township	1	Wayne County		
Cherry Run	1	Centre County		
Cherry Run	1	Union County	17885	
Cherry Run	1	Warren County		
Cherry Township	1	Butler County		
Cherry Township	1	Sullivan County		
Cherry Tree	1	Indiana County	15724	
Cherry Tree	1	Venango County	16354	
Cherry Valley	1	Butler County	16373	
Cherry Valley	1	Washington County	15021	
Cherrydale	1	Montgomery County	19444	
Cherryhill Township	1	Indiana County		
Cherrytown	1	Bradford County		
Cherrytown	1	Huntingdon County	16657	
Cherrytree	1	Venango County		
Cherrytree Township	1	Venango County		
Cherryville	1	Northampton County	18035	
Cherryville	1	Schuylkill County	17966	
Chesney Downs	1	Delaware County	19064	
Chest Springs	1	Cambria County	16624	
Chest Township	1	Cambria County		
Chest Township	1	Clearfield County		
Chester	1	Delaware County	19013	22
Chester Heights	1	Delaware County	19017	
Chester Hill	1	Clearfield County	16866	
Chester Plaza	1	Delaware County	19014	
Chester Springs	1	Chester County	19425	
Chester Township Township	1	Delaware County	19013	
Chester Valley Knoll	1	Chester County	19355	
Chesterbrook	1	Chester County		
Chesterfield	1	Clearfield County	16627	
Chesterville	1	Chester County	19350	
Chestnut Crossroads	1	Cumberland County	17257	
Chestnut Grove	1	Clearfield County	16838	
Chestnut Grove	1	Indiana County		
Chestnut Grove	1	Lycoming County		
Chestnut Hill	1	Erie County	16509	
Chestnut Hill	1	Lancaster County	17512	
Chestnut Hill	1	Northampton County	18042	
Chestnut Hill	1	Philadelphia County	19118	
Chestnut Hill	1	York County		
Chestnut Level	1	Lancaster County	17566	
Chestnut Ridge	1	Fayette County	15422	
Chestnut Ridge	1	Lancaster County	17603	
Chestnut View	1	Lancaster County	17601	
Chestnuthill Township	1	Monroe County		
Cheswick	1	Allegheny County	15024	
Chevy Chase Heights	1	Indiana County	15701	
Chewton	1	Lawrence County	16157	
Cheyney	2	Chester County	19319	
Cheyney	2	Delaware County	19319	
Chickaree	1	Cambria County		
Chickasaw	1	Armstrong County	16259	
Chickies	1	Lancaster County		
Chickory	1	Cambria County	15909	
Chicora	1	Butler County	16025	
Childs	1	Fayette County		
Childs	1	Lackawanna County	18407	
Chillisquaque	1	Northumberland County	17850	
China Hall	1	Bucks County	19020	
Chinchilla	1	Lackawanna County	18410	
Chippewa	1	Lycoming County		
Chippewa Township	1	Beaver County		
Choconut	1	Susquehanna County	18818	
Choconut Township	1	Susquehanna County		
Christian Springs	1	Northampton County	18064	
Christiana	1	Lancaster County	17509	
Christleys Mills	1	Butler County		
Christmans	1	Carbon County	18229	
Christmansville	1	Carbon County		
Christy Manor	1	Armstrong County	16226	
Christy Park	1	Allegheny County		
Chrome	1	Chester County	19362	
Chrystal	1	Potter County	16739	
Chulasky	1	Northumberland County	17821	
Church Hill	1	Chester County		
Church Hill	1	Fayette County	15458	
Church Hill	1	Forest County	16321	
Church Hill	1	Franklin County	17236	
Church Hill	1	Mifflin County		
Church Hill Manor	1	Mifflin County	17084	
Churchill	1	Allegheny County	15221	
Churchill Valley	1	Allegheny County	15235	
Churchtown	1	Cumberland County		
Churchtown	1	Lancaster County	17555	
Churchville	1	Bedford County	16667	
Churchville	1	Bucks County	18966	
Churchville	1	Clarion County		
Churchville	1	Northampton County	18083	
Cinnamon Hills	1	Montgomery County	19406	
Circle Ville	1	Centre County	16801	
Circleville	1	Westmoreland County	15642	
Cisna Run	1	Perry County	17047	
Cito	1	Fulton County	17233	
Claghorn	1	Indiana County		
Clairton	1	Allegheny County	15025	
Clairton Junction	1	Allegheny County	15122	
Clamtown	1	Schuylkill County	18252	
Clapp Farm	1	Venango County	16301	
Clapp Lease	1	Venango County		
Clappertown	1	Blair County	16693	
Clappville	1	Crawford County	16404	
Clara	1	Potter County		
Clara Township	1	Potter County		
Clarence	1	Centre County	16829	
Clarendon	1	Warren County	16313	
Clarendon Heights	1	Warren County		
Claridge	1	Westmoreland County	15623	
Clarington	1	Forest County	15828	
Clarion	1	Clarion County	16214	
Clarion Junction	1	Clarion County		
Clarion Junction	1	Elk County		
Clarion Township	1	Clarion County		
Clark	1	Mercer County	16113	
Clark Manor	1	Beaver County	15001	
Clarksburg	1	Indiana County	15725	
Clarks Green	1	Lackawanna County	18411	
Clarks Mills	1	Mercer County	16114	
Clarks Summit	1	Lackawanna County	18411	
Clarkstown	1	Lycoming County	17756	
Clarksville	1	Greene County	15322	
Clarksville	1	Mercer County		
Clarksville	1	Washington County	15322	
Clarksville Hill	1	Washington County		
Claussville	1	Lehigh County	18069	
Clay	1	Lancaster County	17522	
Clay Hill	1	Franklin County	17201	
Clay Township	1	Butler County		
Clay Township	1	Huntingdon County		
Clay Township	1	Lancaster County		
Clayford	1	Fayette County		
Claylick	1	Franklin County	17236	
Claypoole Heights	1	Indiana County	15701	
Claysburg	1	Blair County	16625	
Claysville	1	Washington County	15323	
Clayton	1	Berks County	19503	
Claytonia	1	Butler County	16057	
Clear Ridge	1	Bedford County		
Clear Ridge	1	Fulton County	17229	
Clear Run	1	Clearfield County	15801	
Clear Spring	1	Lebanon County		
Clear Spring	1	York County	17019	
Clearview	1	Lancaster County	17601	
Clearbrook	1	Delaware County	19050	
Clearbrook Village	1	Montgomery County	19040	
Clearfield	1	Clearfield County	16830	
Clearfield	1	Northampton County	18064	
Clearfield and Mahoning Junction	1	Clearfield County		
Clearfield Junction	1	Clearfield County		
Clearfield Township	1	Butler County		
Clearfield Township	1	Cambria County		
Clearview Estates	1	Beaver County	15001	
Clearville	1	Bedford County	15535	
Clemo	1	Wayne County		
Cleona	1	Lebanon County	17042	
Clermont	1	McKean County	16740	
Clermont Junction	1	McKean County		
Cleveland Township	1	Columbia County		
Cleversburg	1	Cumberland County	17257	
Cleversburg Junction	1	Cumberland County		
Cliff Mine	1	Allegheny County		
Clifford	1	Snyder County		
Clifford	1	Susquehanna County	18413	
Clifford Township	1	Susquehanna County		
Clifton	1	Allegheny County		
Clifton	1	Dauphin County	17057	
Clifton	1	Delaware County		
Clifton	1	Lackawanna County		
Clifton Heights	1	Delaware County	19018	
Clifton Township	1	Lackawanna County		
Climax	1	Armstrong County	16216	
Climax	1	Clarion County	16216	
Climax	1	Indiana County	15944	
Clinton	1	Allegheny County	15026	
Clinton	1	Armstrong County	16229	
Clinton	1	Fayette County	15469	
Clinton Township	1	Butler County		
Clinton Township	1	Lycoming County		
Clinton Township	1	Venango County		
Clinton Township	1	Wayne County		
Clinton Township	1	Wyoming County		
Clintondale	1	Clinton County	17751	
Clintonville	1	Venango County	16372	
Cloe	1	Jefferson County	15767	
Clokey	1	Washington County		
Clonmell	1	Chester County	19390	
Clover Hill	1	Washington County	15423	
Clover Park	1	Berks County	19607	
Clover Run	1	Clearfield County	15757	
Clover Township	1	Jefferson County		
Clovercreek	1	Blair County		
Cloverdale Park	1	Montgomery County	18915	
Cloverly Acres	1	Dauphin County		
Cloverly Heights	1	Dauphin County		
Clune	1	Indiana County	15727	
Cly	1	York County	17370	
Clyde	1	Indiana County	15944	
Clyde	1	Northampton County	18014	
Clyde No. 2	1	Greene County		
Clyde No. 3	1	Washington County	15322	
Clymer	1	Indiana County	15728	
Clymer	1	Tioga County	16943	
Clymer Township	1	Tioga County		
Coal Brook	1	Fayette County	15425	
Coal Cabin Beach	1	York County	17314	
Coal Castle	1	Schuylkill County	17901	
Coal Center	1	Washington County	15423	
Coal City	1	Venango County	16374	
Coal Township	1	Northumberland County		
Coaldale	1	Bedford County	16679	
Coal Glen	1	Jefferson County	15824	
Coal Hill	1	Venango County	16301	
Coal Hollow	1	Butler County		
Coal Hollow	1	Elk County	15846	
Coal Junction	1	Somerset County		
Coal Run	1	Clearfield County	16666	
Coal Run	1	Indiana County		
Coal Run	1	Northumberland County	17866	
Coal Run	1	Somerset County		
Coal Valley	1	Allegheny County	15344	
Coaldale	1	Centre County		
Coaldale	1	Dauphin County	17048	
Coaldale	1	Schuylkill County	18218	
Coalmont	1	Huntingdon County	16678	
Coalport	1	Carbon County	18229	
Coalport	1	Clearfield County	16627	
Coaltown	1	Butler County	16057	
Coaltown	1	Lawrence County	16101	
Coatesville	1	Chester County	19320	
Cobalt Ridge	1	Bucks County		
Cobblesville	1	Cumberland County	17241	
Cobbs Corners	1	Warren County	16434	
Cobham	1	Warren County	16351	
Coburn	1	Blair County	16601	
Coburn	1	Centre County	16832	
Cocalico	1	Lancaster County	17517	
Cocalico House	1	Lancaster County		
Cochran Acres	1	Beaver County	15001	
Cochrans Mill	1	Allegheny County	15025	
Cochrans Mills	1	Armstrong County	16226	
Cochranton	1	Crawford County	16314	
Cochranville	1	Chester County	19330	
Cocolamus	1	Juniata County	17014	
Codding	1	Bradford County		
Coder	1	Jefferson County		
Codorus	1	York County	17311	
Codorus Furnace	1	York County		
Codorus Mills	1	York County		
Codorus Township	1	York County		
Coffeetown	1	Lebanon County	17078	
Coffeetown	1	Lehigh County	18102	
Coffeetown	1	Northampton County	18042	
Coffman	1	Fayette County		
Cogan House Township	1	Lycoming County		
Cogan Station	1	Lycoming County	17728	
Coheva	1	Lebanon County		
Coilton	1	Northampton County		
Cokeburg	1	Washington County	15324	
Cokeburg Junction	1	Washington County	15331	
Cold Point	1	Montgomery County	19462	
Cold Run	1	Berks County		
Cold Spring	1	Bradford County		
Cold Spring	1	Chester County	19464	
Cold Spring	1	Franklin County	17222	
Cold Spring	1	Huntingdon County		
Cold Spring	1	Wayne County		
Cold Spring	1	York County	17360	
Cold Spring Township	1	Lebanon County		
Coldbrook	1	Fayette County		
Colebrook	1	Lebanon County	17015	
Colebrook Township	1	Clinton County		
Colebrookdale	1	Berks County	19512	
Colebrookdale Township	1	Berks County		
Colegrove	1	McKean County	16749	
Cole Hill	1	Lancaster County		
Coleman	1	Allegheny County		
Coleman	1	Jefferson County		
Coleman	1	Somerset County	15541	
Colemanville	1	Lancaster County	17565	
Colerain	1	Huntingdon County	16683	
Colerain	1	Huntingdon County		
Colerain Forge	1	Huntingdon County	16683	
Colerain Township	1	Bedford County		
Colerain Township	1	Lancaster County		
Coles	1	Schuylkill County	17948	
Coles Creek	1	Columbia County	17814	
Coles Mill	1	Columbia County		
Colesburg	1	Potter County	16915	
Colesville	2	Lehigh County	18015	
Colesville	2	Northampton County	18015	
Coleville	1	Centre County	16823	
Coleville	1	McKean County	16749	
Colfax	1	Huntingdon County	16652	
College	1	Beaver County		
College	1	Northampton County	18042	
College A	1	Monroe County	18301	
College Heights	1	Berks County	19605	
College Hill	1	Beaver County	15010	
College Misericordia	1	Luzerne County	18612	
College Park	1	Montgomery County	19031	
College Park	1	Union County	17837	
College Township	1	Centre County		
Collegeville	1	Montgomery County	19426	
Colley	1	Sullivan County		
Colley Township	1	Sullivan County		
Collier	1	Fayette County	15401	
Collier Township	1	Allegheny County		
Collingdale	1	Delaware County	19023	
Collins	1	Lancaster County	17566	
Collinsburg	1	Westmoreland County	15089	
Collinsville	1	York County	17302	
Collomsville	1	Lycoming County	17702	
Colmar	1	Montgomery County	18915	
Colon	1	Jefferson County		
Colona	1	Beaver County	15061	
Colonial Crest	1	Dauphin County	17112	
Colonial Hills	1	Berks County	19608	
Colonial Hills	1	Mifflin County	17044	
Colonial Manor	1	Lancaster County	17603	
Colonial Park	1	Dauphin County	17109	
Colonial Park	1	Delaware County	19064	
Colonial Park	1	Lancaster County	17540	
Colonial Park	1	Northumberland County		
Colonial Village	2	Chester County	19087	
Colonial Village	2	Montgomery County	19087	
Colonial Village	1	Venango County		
Columbia	1	Lancaster County	17512	
Columbia Cross Roads	1	Bradford County	16914	
Columbia Hill	1	Montour County		
Columbia Township	1	Bradford County		
Columbus	1	Warren County	16405	
Columbus Township	1	Warren County		
Colver	1	Cambria County	15927	
Colwell	1	Armstrong County		
Colwyn	1	Delaware County	19023	
Colyer	1	Centre County		
Colza	1	Warren County	16407	
Comly	1	Montour County	17772	
Commerce	1	Philadelphia County	19108	
Commodore	1	Indiana County	15729	
Compass	1	Chester County	17527	
Comps Crossroads	1	Somerset County		
Compton	1	Allegheny County		
Compton	1	Somerset County		
Conashaugh	1	Pike County		
Concord	1	Erie County		
Concord	1	Franklin County	17217	
Concord Park	1	Bucks County	19049	
Concord Township	1	Butler County		
Concord Township	1	Delaware County		
Concord Township	1	Erie County		
Concordville	1	Delaware County	19331	
Condit Crossing	1	Washington County		
Condron	1	Cambria County		
Conemaugh	1	Cambria County	15909	
Conemaugh Township	1	Cambria County		
Conemaugh Township	1	Indiana County		
Conemaugh Township	1	Somerset County		
Conestoga	1	Chester County		
Conestoga	1	Lancaster County	17516	
Conestoga Farms	1	Delaware County	19317	
Conestoga Gardens	1	Lancaster County		
Conestoga Township	1	Lancaster County		
Conestoga Woods	1	Lancaster County	17604	
Coneville	1	Potter County	16748	
Conewago	1	Lancaster County	17022	
Conewago Heights	1	York County	17345	
Conewago Township	1	Adams County		
Conewago Township	1	Dauphin County		
Conewago Township	1	York County		
Conewango Township	1	Warren County		
Confluence	1	Somerset County	15424	
Conger	1	Washington County	15329	
Congo	1	Montgomery County	19504	
Congress Hill	1	Clearfield County		
Congruity	1	Westmoreland County	15601	
Conifer	1	Jefferson County	15864	
Conklin Hill	1	Wayne County		
Connaughtown	1	Montgomery County	19428	
Conneaut Center	1	Crawford County		
Conneaut Lake	1	Crawford County	16316	
Conneaut Lake Park	1	Crawford County	16316	
Conneaut Lakeshore	1	Crawford County		
Conneaut Township	1	Crawford County		
Conneaut Township	1	Erie County		
Conneautville	1	Crawford County	16406	
Connellsville	1	Fayette County	15425	
Connellsville Township	1	Fayette County		
Conners Mill	1	Lancaster County		
Connersville	1	Northumberland County	17851	
Connerton	1	Schuylkill County	17935	
Connoquenessing	1	Butler County	16027	
Connoquenessing Township	1	Butler County		
Conoy Township	1	Lancaster County		
Conpitt Junction	1	Indiana County		
Conrad	1	Potter County	16720	
Conshohocken	1	Montgomery County	19428	
Conshohocken Station	1	Montgomery County		
Constitution	1	York County		
Content	1	Jefferson County		
Continental	1	Philadelphia County	19106	
Continental No. 2	1	Fayette County		
Conway	1	Beaver County	15027	
Conyngham	1	Luzerne County	18219	
Conyngham	1	Luzerne County		
Conyngham Township	1	Columbia County		
Conyngham Township	1	Luzerne County		
Cook Tomb	1	Forest County		
Cook Township	1	Westmoreland County		
Cooke Township	1	Cumberland County		
Cookport	1	Indiana County	15729	
Cooks	1	Huntingdon County		
Cooks Mills	1	Bedford County	15545	
Cooks Run	1	Clinton County	17778	
Cooks Summit	1	Armstrong County		
Cooksburg	1	Forest County	16217	
Cool Spring	1	Mercer County		
Cool Valley	1	Washington County	15317	
Coolbaugh Township	1	Monroe County		
Coolbaughs	1	Monroe County	18324	
Coolidge Hollow	1	Tioga County		
Coolspring	1	Fayette County	15445	
Coolspring	1	Jefferson County	15730	
Coolspring Township	1	Mercer County		
Coon Corners	1	Crawford County	16335	
Coon Hunter	1	Snyder County	17842	
Coon Island	1	Washington County		
Coontown	1	McKean County	16735	
Cooper Corners	1	Wyoming County		
Cooper Settlement	1	Clearfield County	16834	
Cooper Township	1	Clearfield County		
Cooper Township	1	Montour County		
Coopersburg	1	Lehigh County	18036	
Coopersdale	1	Cambria County		
Cooperstown	1	Butler County	16059	
Cooperstown	1	Venango County	16317	
Cooperstown	1	Westmoreland County	15650	
Coopersville	1	Lancaster County	17509	
Copella	1	Northampton County	18014	
Copes Bridge	1	Chester County	19380	
Copesville	1	Chester County	19380	
Coplay	1	Lehigh County	18037	
Coral	1	Indiana County	15731	
Coraopolis	1	Allegheny County	15108	
Coraopolis Heights	1	Allegheny County	15108	
Corbett	1	Potter County		
Corbettown	1	Jefferson County		
Cordelia	1	Lancaster County		
Corduroy	1	Elk County		
Corinne	1	Chester County	19380	
Cork Lane	1	Luzerne County	18640	
Corliss	1	Allegheny County	15204	
Corner Ketch	1	Chester County	19335	
Corner Store	1	Chester County	19460	
Corning	1	Lehigh County	18092	
Cornish	1	Fayette County	15451	
Cornog	1	Chester County	19343	
Cornplanter Township	1	Venango County		
Cornpropst	1	Huntingdon County	16652	
Cornwall	1	Lebanon County	17016	
Cornwall Center	1	Lebanon County	17016	
Cornwall Furnace	1	Lebanon County		
Cornwall Junction	1	Lebanon County		
Cornwells Heights	1	Bucks County	19020	
Cornwells Heights-Eddington	1	Bucks County		
Corpers Homes	1	Montgomery County	19444	
Corrine	1	Chester County	19380	
Corry	1	Erie County	16407	
Corsica	1	Jefferson County	15829	
Corsons	1	Montgomery County		
Cortez	1	Jefferson County	15767	
Cortez	1	Lackawanna County	18436	
Corwins Corners	1	McKean County	16701	
Corydon Township	1	McKean County		
Coryland	1	Bradford County		
Coryville	1	McKean County	16723	
Coseytown	1	Franklin County		
Cosgrove	1	Somerset County		
Cosmus	1	Armstrong County		
Cossart	1	Chester County		
Costello	1	Potter County	16720	
Cosytown	1	Franklin County	17225	
Cottage	1	Huntingdon County	16669	
Cottage Grove	1	Lawrence County	16105	
Cottage Hill	1	Clarion County	16242	
Cottageville	1	Bucks County	18901	
Cottles Corner	1	Bedford County		
Cotton Town	1	Blair County	16625	
Couchtown	1	Perry County	17047	
Coudersport	1	Potter County	16915	
Coudley	1	Clearfield County		
Coulter	1	Allegheny County		
Coulter	1	Jefferson County		
Coulters	1	Allegheny County	15028	
Council Crest	1	Luzerne County	18201	
Country Acres	1	Montgomery County	19444	
Country Club Estates	1	Delaware County	19043	
Country Club Estates	1	Lancaster County	17601	
Country Club Estates	1	Montgomery County	19444	
Country Club Heights	1	Lancaster County	17601	
Country Gardens	1	Lancaster County	17540	
Country Hills	1	Westmoreland County	15642	
County Junction	1	Westmoreland County		
County Line	1	Bucks County		
Coupon	1	Cambria County	16629	
Courtdale	1	Luzerne County	18704	
Courtney	1	Washington County	15029	
Courtneys Mills	1	Mercer County		
Covalt	1	Fulton County		
Cove	1	Perry County	17020	
Covedale	1	Blair County		
Cove Gap	1	Franklin County	17236	
Coventry Mall	1	Montgomery County	19464	
Coventryville	1	Chester County	19464	
Coverdale	1	Allegheny County	15102	
Coverdale	1	Blair County	16693	
Coverdale	1	Lawrence County	16141	
Cover Hill	1	Cambria County		
Covert	1	Bradford County		
Coverts	1	Lawrence County		
Coveville	1	Monroe County	18325	
Coveytown	1	Sullivan County	18614	
Covington	1	Tioga County	16917	
Covington Township	1	Clearfield County		
Covington Township	1	Lackawanna County		
Covington Township	1	Tioga County		
Covode	1	Indiana County	15767	
Cowan	1	Armstrong County		
Cowan	1	Union County	17844	
Cowanesque	1	Tioga County	16918	
Cowansburg	1	Westmoreland County	15642	
Cowanshannock Township	1	Armstrong County		
Cowans Village	1	Franklin County	17224	
Cowansville	1	Armstrong County	16218	
Cowden	1	Washington County	15057	
Cowley	1	Bradford County		
Coxeville	1	Carbon County	18216	
Coxton	1	Luzerne County	18642	
Coy	1	Indiana County	15748	
Coy Junction	1	Indiana County	15748	
Coyle	1	Cumberland County		
Coyleville	1	Butler County	16034	
Coyne Lock	1	York County		
Crabapple	1	Greene County	15380	
Crabtree	1	Westmoreland County	15624	
Crabtree Hollow	1	Bucks County		
Cracker Jack	1	Washington County	15063	
Crackersport	1	Lehigh County	18104	
Crafton	1	Allegheny County	15205	
Crafton Heights	1	Allegheny County	15205	
Craig	1	Lackawanna County	18414	
Craigheads	1	Cumberland County	17013	
Craigs	1	Schuylkill County	17948	
Craigs Meadow	1	Monroe County	18301	
Craigsville	1	Armstrong County	16262	
Craley	1	York County	17312	
Cramer	1	Indiana County	15954	
Cramer	1	Jefferson County		
Cranberry	1	Luzerne County	18201	
Cranberry	1	Venango County	16319	
Cranberry Ridge	1	Luzerne County	18201	
Cranberry Township	1	Butler County		
Cranberry Township	1	Venango County		
Cranesville	1	Erie County	16410	
Crates	1	Clarion County	16240	
Crawford	1	McKean County		
Crawford Corners	1	Venango County		
Crawford Township	1	Clinton County		
Crawfordtown	1	Jefferson County	15733	
Crayton	1	Erie County		
Creamery	1	Montgomery County	19430	
Creamton	1	Wayne County		
Creasy	1	Columbia County		
Creekside	1	Indiana County	15732	
Creighton	1	Allegheny County	15030	
Crenshaw	1	Jefferson County	15824	
Crescent Heights	1	Washington County	15427	
Crescent Heights-Walkertown-Daisytown	1	Washington County		
Crescent Hills	1	Allegheny County	15235	
Crescent Lake	1	Monroe County	18332	
Crescent Township	1	Allegheny County		
Crescentdale	1	Lawrence County	16157	
Crescentville	1	Philadelphia County		
Cresco	1	Monroe County	18326	
Creslo	1	Cambria County		
Creslo	1	Cambria County		
Cresmont	1	Schuylkill County	17931	
Cress	1	Franklin County	17268	
Cresson	1	Cambria County	16630	
Cresson State School and Hospital	1	Cambria County	16630	
Cresson Township	1	Cambria County		
Cressona	1	Schuylkill County	17929	
Crestmont	1	Clinton County	17745	
Crestmont	1	Montgomery County	19090	
Crestmont Village	1	Beaver County	15001	
Crestview	1	Montgomery County	19040	
Crestview	1	Northampton County	18042	
Crestview	1	Washington County		
Crestwood	1	Luzerne County		
Creswell	1	Lancaster County	17516	
Crete	1	Indiana County		
Cribb	1	Westmoreland County		
Criders Corners	1	Butler County	16046	
Crisp	1	Westmoreland County		
Croft	1	Clearfield County	16830	
Crolls Mills	1	Butler County		
Cromby	1	Chester County	19460	
Cromwell Township	1	Huntingdon County		
Crooked Creek	1	Huntingdon County	16652	
Crooked Creek	1	Tioga County	16935	
Crookham	1	Washington County	15332	
Crosby	1	McKean County	16724	
Cross Creek	1	Washington County	15021	
Cross Creek Township	1	Washington County		
Cross Fork	1	Potter County	17729	
Cross Keys	1	Adams County	17350	
Cross Keys	1	Blair County	16635	
Cross Keys	1	Bucks County	18901	
Cross Keys	1	Juniata County	17021	
Cross Mill	1	York County		
Cross Pump Station	1	Jefferson County		
Cross Roads	1	York County	17322	
Cross Village	1	Carbon County		
Crossgrove	1	Snyder County	17841	
Crossingville	1	Crawford County	16412	
Crosskill Mills	1	Berks County		
Crossland	1	Fayette County		
Crossroads	1	Northampton County	18014	
Crosswicks	1	Montgomery County	19046	
Crothers	1	Washington County		
Crown	1	Clarion County	16220	
Crows Mills	1	Greene County		
Croydon	1	Bucks County	19021	
Croydon Acres	1	Bucks County	19021	
Croydon Crest	1	Bucks County	19021	
Croydon Heights	1	Bucks County	19021	
Croydon Manor	1	Bucks County	19021	
Croydon Park	1	Bucks County	19021	
Croyland	1	Elk County		
Croyle Township	1	Cambria County		
Crozar Terrace	1	Delaware County	19013	
Crozer Park Gardens	1	Delaware County	19013	
Crozier Run Branch Junction	1	Fayette County		
Crozierville	1	Delaware County		
Crucible	1	Greene County	15325	
Crum Creek Manor	1	Delaware County	19013	
Crum Lynne	1	Delaware County	19022	19078
Crumb	1	Somerset County		
Crystal	1	Fayette County		
Crystal	1	Potter County	16739	
Crystal Lake	1	Susquehanna County	18421	
Crystal Spring	1	Fulton County	15536	
Crystal Springs	1	Forest County		
Cuba Mills	1	Juniata County	17059	
Cuddy	1	Allegheny County	15031	
Cuddy Hill	1	Allegheny County	15031	
Culbertson	1	Franklin County		
Culmerville	1	Allegheny County	15084	
Culp	1	Blair County	16601	
Culpepper Woods	1	Montgomery County	19444	
Cumberland Park	1	Cumberland County	17011	
Cumberland Township	1	Adams County		
Cumberland Township	1	Greene County		
Cumberland Valley Township	1	Bedford County		
Cumberland Village	1	Greene County	15320	
Cumbola	1	Schuylkill County	17930	
Cumiskey	1	Bradford County		
Cummings	1	Indiana County		
Cummings Township	1	Lycoming County		
Cummingstown	1	Cumberland County	17013	
Cummingswood Park	1	Westmoreland County	15610	
Cumminsville	1	Cumberland County		
Cumru Township	1	Berks County		
Cuneo	1	Elk County	15846	
Cunningham	1	Butler County		
Cupola	1	Chester County	19344	
Curfew	1	Fayette County		
Curley Hill	1	Bucks County	18901	
Curllsville	1	Clarion County	16221	
Curren Terrace	1	Montgomery County	19401	
Curry	1	Allegheny County		
Curry	1	Blair County		
Curry Hill	1	Luzerne County		
Curry Run	1	Clearfield County	15757	
Currys Mills	1	Butler County		
Curryville	1	Blair County	16631	
Curtin	1	Centre County	16841	
Curtin Township	1	Centre County		
Curtis Hills	1	Montgomery County	19095	
Curtis Park	1	Centre County	16866	
Curtis Park	1	Delaware County	19079	
Curtisville	1	Allegheny County	15032	
Curwensville	1	Clearfield County	16833	
Cush Creek	1	Indiana County		
Cussewago Township	1	Crawford County		
Custards	1	Crawford County	16314	
Custer City	1	McKean County	16725	
Custis Woods	1	Montgomery County	19038	
Cutler Summit	1	Potter County		
Cyclone	1	McKean County	16726	
Cymbria	1	Cambria County		
Cymbria Mine	1	Cambria County	15714	
Cynwyd	1	Montgomery County		
Cynwyd Estates	1	Montgomery County	19004	
Cynwyd Hills	1	Montgomery County	19004	
Cypher	1	Bedford County	16650	
Cyrus	1	Venango County		
