= Connoquenessing =

Connoquenessing can refer to:

- The borough of Connoquenessing, Pennsylvania
- Connoquenessing Township, Pennsylvania
- The Connoquenessing Creek
- Connoquenessing sandstone, a member of the Pottsville Formation
