= Carson Valley, Pennsylvania =

Unincorporated community in Pennsylvania, US

- Census-designated place
- Location within Pennsylvania Location within the United States
- Coordinates: 40°26′57″N 78°26′55″W
- Country: United States
- State: Pennsylvania
- County: Blair
- Township: Allegheny

Area
  - Total: 0.10 sq mi (0.27 km^{2})
  - Land: 0.10 sq mi (0.27 km^{2})
  - Water: 0 sq mi (0.00 km^{2})
- Elevation: 1,112 ft (339 m)

Population (2020)
  - Total: 134
  - Density: 1,271.1/sq mi (490.79/km^{2})
- Time zone: UTC-5 (Eastern (EST))
  - Summer (DST): UTC-4 (EDT)
- ZIP Code: 16635 (Duncansville)
- Area codes: 814/582
- FIPS code: 42-11492
- GNIS feature ID: 2807041

Carson Valley is an unincorporated community and census-designated place (CDP) in Blair County, Pennsylvania, United States. It was first listed as a CDP prior to the 2020 census.

The CDP is in western Blair County, in the eastern part of Allegheny Township. It is named for the valley in which it sits, drained to the east by Spencer Run coming down from the Allegheny Front. Carson Valley Road leads east to Pennsylvania Route 764 at Cross Keys and west up the valley 2 miles (3 km) to the foot of the Allegheny Front escarpment. U.S. Route 22, a four-lane freeway, runs south and west of Carson Valley, with the closest access to the east from PA 764. Altoona is 6 miles (10 km) north of the CDP, and Hollidaysburg is 4 miles (6 km) to the southeast. Cresson is 12 miles (19 km) to the west via Route 22.

== Demographics ==
Historical population
Census	Pop.	Note	%±
2020	134		—
U.S. Decennial Census

== Education ==
The school district is Hollidaysburg Area School District.
