= Coder (disambiguation) =

A coder is a person who writes computer software.

It may also refer to:

- Coder (social sciences), someone who performs coding in the social sciences
- Clinical coder, someone who performs medical coding
- Coder, Pennsylvania, an unincorporated community
