= Sunbrook, Pennsylvania =

Unincorporated community in Pennsylvania, US

- Census-designated place
- Location within Pennsylvania Location within the United States
- Coordinates: 40°26′02″N 78°25′57″W
- Country: United States
- State: Pennsylvania
- County: Blair
- Township: Allegheny

Area
  - Total: 0.33 sq mi (0.86 km^{2})
  - Land: 0.33 sq mi (0.86 km^{2})
  - Water: 0 sq mi (0.0 km^{2})
- Elevation: 1,161 ft (354 m)
- Time zone: UTC-5 (Eastern (EST))
  - Summer (DST): UTC-4 (EDT)
- ZIP Code: 16635 (Duncansville)
- Area codes: 814/582
- FIPS code: 42-75296
- GNIS feature ID: 2807059

Sunbrook is an unincorporated community and census-designated place (CDP) in Blair County, Pennsylvania, United States. It was first listed as a CDP prior to the 2020 census.

The CDP is southwest of the center of Blair County, in the east part of Allegheny Township. It is bordered to the south by the borough of Duncansville, to the east by Interstate 99, to the west by U.S. Route 22, and to the north by exit 28 connecting the two highways. It is 4 miles (6 km) by road west of Hollidaysburg, the county seat, and it is 7 miles (11 km) south of Altoona.
