= Charles Yon =

American football player and coach

Biographical details
- Born: June 16, 1876; Duncansville, Pennsylvania, U.S.
- Died: 1937 (aged 60–61)
- Education: Susquehanna (1901)

Coaching career (HC unless noted)
- 1902: Susquehanna

Head coaching record
- Overall: 1–7

Charles Yon (June 16, 1876 – October 1937) was an American football player and coach. He served as the head football coach at Susquehanna University from in 1902.
