= Cherry Grove Township =

Cherry Grove Township may refer to the following places in the United States:

- Cherry Grove Township, Michigan
- Cherry Grove Township, Goodhue County, Minnesota
- Cherry Grove Township, Warren County, Pennsylvania

== See also ==
- Cherry Grove-Shannon Township, Carroll County, Illinois
