= John McGraw (disambiguation) =

John McGraw (1873–1934) was an American baseball player and manager.

John McGraw may also refer to:

- John McGraw (merchant) (1815–1877), New York lumber tycoon and one of the founding trustees of Cornell University
- John McGraw (governor) (1850–1910), governor of Washington from 1893 to 1897
- John McGraw (pitcher) (1890–1967), American baseball pitcher
- John McGraw (brigadier general) (1912–1976), American soldier and surgeon
- Jon McGraw (born 1979), American football player in the National Football League
