= Canan Station, Pennsylvania =

Unincorporated community in Pennsylvania, US

- Census-designated place
- Location within Pennsylvania Location within the United States
- Coordinates: 40°27′46″N 78°25′55″W
- Country: United States
- State: Pennsylvania
- County: Blair
- Township: Allegheny

Area
  - Total: 0.10 sq mi (0.27 km^{2})
  - Land: 0.10 sq mi (0.27 km^{2})
  - Water: 0 sq mi (0.00 km^{2})
- Elevation: 1,070 ft (330 m)

Population (2020)
  - Total: 101
  - Density: 958.6/sq mi (370.12/km^{2})
- Time zone: UTC-5 (Eastern (EST))
  - Summer (DST): UTC-4 (EDT)
- ZIP Code: 16601 (Altoona)
- Area codes: 814/582
- FIPS code: 42-11088
- GNIS feature ID: 2805469

Canan Station is an unincorporated community and census-designated place (CDP) in Blair County, Pennsylvania, United States. It was first listed as a CDP prior to the 2020 census. The community is also known as Canan.

== Geography ==
The CDP is in west-central Blair County, in the northeastern part of Allegheny Township. It is 5 miles (8 km) south of the center of Altoona and 3 miles (5 km) north of Duncansville and is on the west side of the valley of Beaverdam Branch, which flows southeastward through Hollidaysburg to the Frankstown Branch of the Juniata River.

== Demographics ==
Historical population
Census	Pop.	Note	%±
2020	101		—
U.S. Decennial Census

== Education ==
The school district is Hollidaysburg Area School District.
