= Allegheny Township, Blair County, Pennsylvania =

Township in Pennsylvania, US

- Township
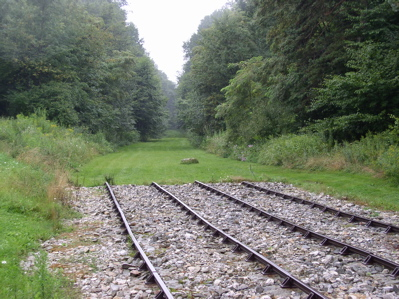
- Rails at the Allegheny Portage Railroad National Historic Site

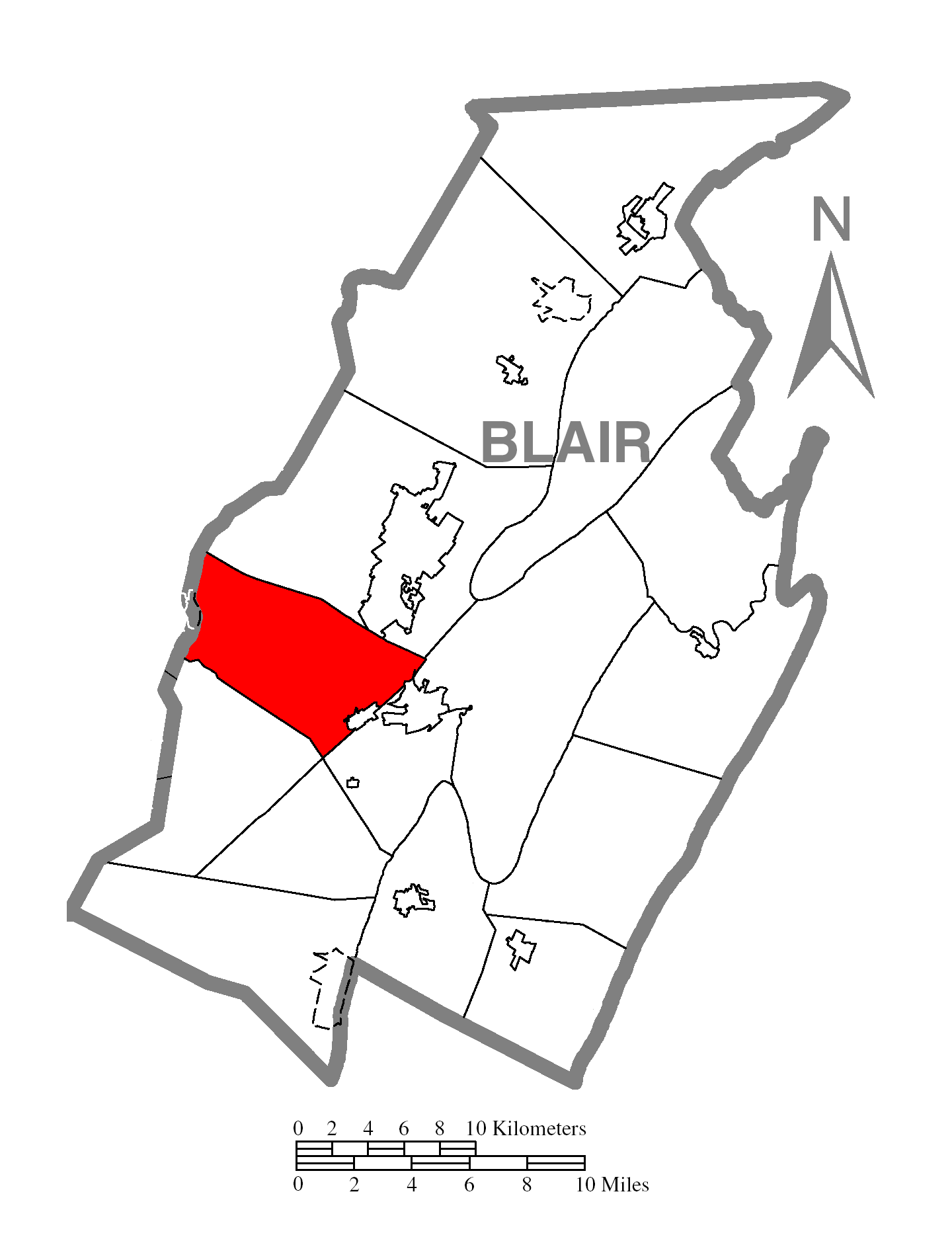
- Map of Blair County, Pennsylvania, highlighting Allegheny Township

- Map of Blair County, Pennsylvania
- Country: United States
- State: Pennsylvania
- County: Blair
- Settled: 1773
- Incorporated: 1793

Government
  - Type: Board of Supervisors

Area
  - Total: 29.62 sq mi (76.72 km^{2})
  - Land: 29.61 sq mi (76.70 km^{2})
  - Water: 0.0039 sq mi (0.01 km^{2})

Population (2020)
  - Total: 6,585
  - Density: 223.5/sq mi (86.31/km^{2})
- Time zone: UTC-5 (Eastern (EST))
  - Summer (DST): UTC-4 (EDT)
- Area code: 814
- FIPS code: 42-013-00852
- Website: www.alleghenytownship.us

Allegheny Township is a township in Blair County, Pennsylvania, United States. The population was 6,585 at the 2020 census. It is part of the Altoona, Pennsylvania Metropolitan Statistical Area.

== Geography ==
Allegheny Township is located in western Blair County. It is bordered by the city of Altoona and Logan Township to the north, Frankstown Township to the east, the boroughs of Hollidaysburg and Duncansville as well as Blair Township to the southeast, Freedom Township at Allegheny Township's southernmost point, and Juniata Township to the southwest. The western border is the Blair County–Cambria County line, with Cresson and Gallitzin townships directly bordering. The borough of Tunnelhill where it enters Blair County also borders the west side of the township.

Communities within the township include Canan Station, Carson Valley, Cross Keys, Sunbrook, most of Foot of Ten, and part of Lakemont, all in the eastern part of the township.

According to the United States Census Bureau, Allegheny Township has a total area of 29.6 square miles (76.7 km^{2}), of which 0.004 square miles (0.01 km^{2}), or 0.02%, is water.

== Demographics ==
Historical population
Census	Pop.	Note	%±
2010	6,738		—
2020	6,585		−2.3%
U.S. Decennial Census

As of the census of 2000, there were 6,965 people, 2,658 households, and 1,836 families residing in the township. The population density was 236.6 inhabitants per square mile (91.4/km^{2}). There were 2,847 housing units at an average density of 96.7 per square mile (37.3/km^{2}). The racial makeup of the township was 98.58% White, 0.65% African American, 0.36% Asian, 0.04% Pacific Islander, 0.01% from other races, and 0.36% from two or more races. Hispanic or Latino of any race were 0.17% of the population.

There were 2,658 households, out of which 28.4% had children under the age of 18 living with them, 53.3% were married couples living together, 12.0% had a female householder with no husband present, and 30.9% were non-families. 27.6% of all households were made up of individuals, and 13.0% had someone living alone who was 65 years of age or older. The average household size was 2.37 and the average family size was 2.87.

In the township the population was spread out, with 20.7% under the age of 18, 6.3% from 18 to 24, 24.0% from 25 to 44, 25.8% from 45 to 64, and 23.2% who were 65 years of age or older. The median age was 44 years. For every 100 females there were 100.3 males. For every 100 females age 18 and over, there were 98.7 males.

The median income for a household in the township was $31,962, and the median income for a family was $36,599. Males had a median income of $30,581 versus $21,940 for females. The per capita income for the township was $16,204. About 7.1% of families and 9.0% of the population were below the poverty line, including 12.7% of those under age 18 and 5.7% of those age 65 or over.
