= Rube Bressler =

American baseball player (1894–1966)

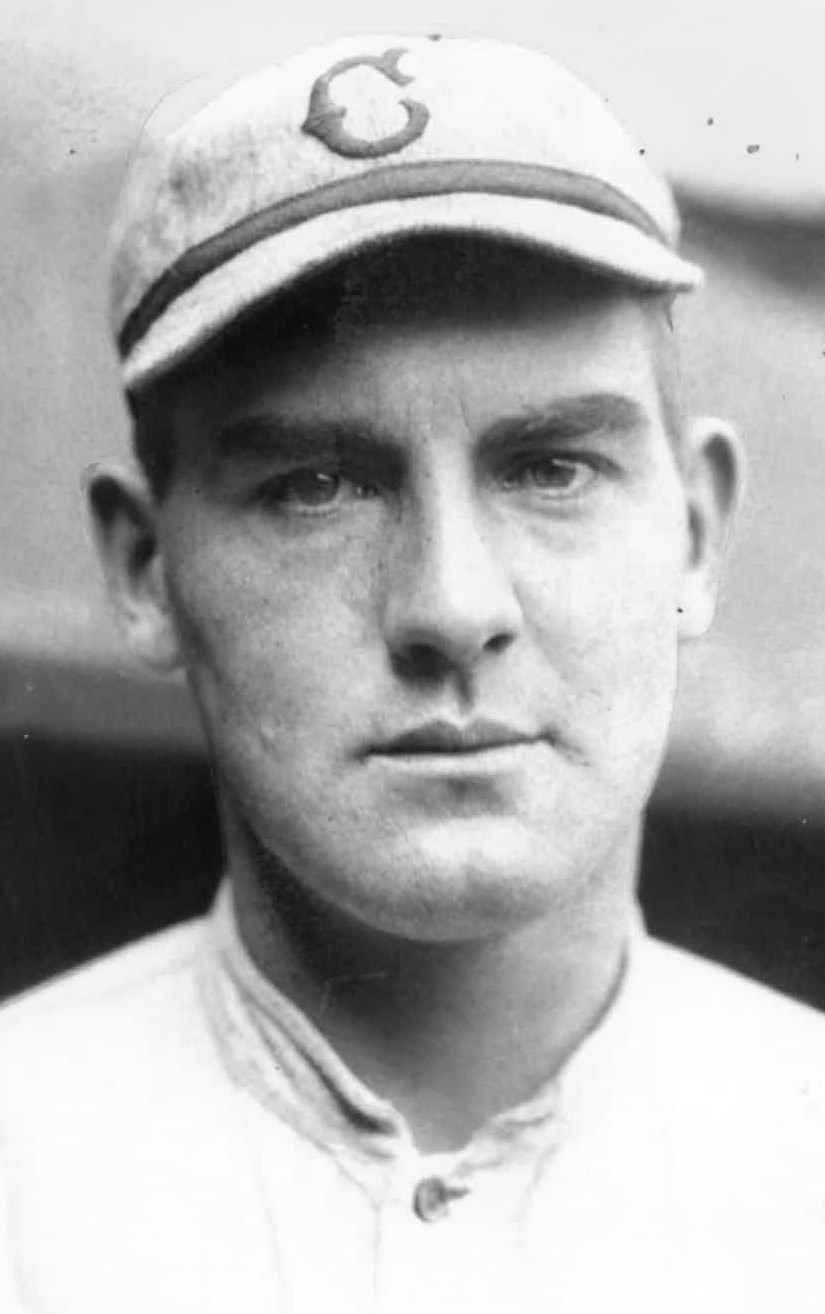
- Left fielder / Pitcher
- Born: October 23, 1894; Coder, Pennsylvania, U.S.
- Died: November 7, 1966 (aged 72); Cincinnati, Ohio, U.S.
- Batted: Right Threw: Left

MLB debut
- April 24, 1914, for the Philadelphia Athletics

Last MLB appearance
- July 17, 1932, for the St. Louis Cardinals

MLB statistics
- Batting average: .301
- Home runs: 32
- Runs batted in: 586
- Win–loss record: 26–32
- Earned run average: 3.40
- Strikeouts: 229
- Stats at Baseball Reference

Teams
- Philadelphia Athletics (1914–1916); Cincinnati Reds (1917–1927); Brooklyn Robins (1928–1931); Philadelphia Phillies (1932); St. Louis Cardinals (1932)

Career highlights and awards
- Cincinnati Reds Hall of Fame

Raymond Bloom "Rube" Bressler (October 23, 1894 – November 7, 1966) was an American left-handed pitcher in Major League Baseball for the Philadelphia Athletics from 1914 to 1916 and Cincinnati Reds from 1917 to 1920, before being converted to an outfielder and first baseman for Cincinnati from 1918 to 1927, the Brooklyn Robins from 1928 to 1931 and the Philadelphia Phillies and St. Louis Cardinals in his final year of 1932. The first two teams he played for made it to a World Series, the 1914 Philadelphia Athletics lost to the miracle Boston Braves, while the 1919 Cincinnati Reds won against the scandal-tainted Chicago White Sox.

Bressler was born in Coder, Pennsylvania, and grew up in nearby Flemington. He played for a company team at Renovo, Pennsylvania, where he worked in a railroad shop before being recruited by Earle Mack, son of Connie Mack after beating Earle's All-Stars in a local game in 1912.

== Professional career ==
The following year, Bressler pitched for Harrisburg of the Tri-State League and, the year after that, was brought to the Philadelphia club as the newest player at the end of the famous 1910–1914 dynasty. Bressler was assigned to room with future Hall of Fame pitcher Chief Bender when he made his big league debut April 24, 1914. He posted a respectable 10–4 record and 1.77 ERA for the 1914 American League champions, before dropping to a 4–17 record with a 5.20 ERA the following year. By 1916, he dropped to 0–2 with a 6.60 ERA and was sent down to the minor leagues.

But with America's entry into World War I and a shortage of qualified professional baseball players, Cincinnati of the National League brought him back. His 8–5 record and 2.46 ERA in 1918 earned him two more seasons with the club as a pitcher. He finished his pitching career in 1920 with a lifetime record of 26–32, and a 3.40 ERA

Though Bressler's career as a pitcher was short-lived, he would go on to play more than a decade as an outfielder and first baseman. In his first season as a position player in 1918, Bressler appeared in only three games off the pitcher's mound. He split the next two seasons before it became apparent he would serve the team better as a slick-fielding, good-hitting position player than as an injury-prone pitcher. From 1921 onward, Bressler became a full-time position player, never pitching another game in the major leagues. He finished his career with 1170 base hits, 32 home runs, 586 RBI and a .301 batting average.

Bressler is one of six players since 1900 in the major leagues who started their careers as pitchers and ended up as position players while totaling more than 50 games pitched and 50 games played at other positions. The others include Babe Ruth, Smoky Joe Wood, Johnny Cooney, Reb Russell, and Rick Ankiel. Lefty O'Doul was also famous for having switched from pitcher to position player, however, he pitched in only 34 games for 77 total innings pitched with just two decisions.

== Later life and honors ==
In the final years of his life, Bressler was interviewed by writer Lawrence Ritter for Ritter's 1966 baseball classic The Glory of Their Times. Bressler died in Cincinnati at age 72.

Bressler was inducted into the Cincinnati Reds Hall of Fame in 1963.
