= North American Communications =

American company

- Industry: Direct-mail
- Founded: 1979; 47 years ago
- Founder: Michael Herman (co-founder)
- Defunct: 2019
- Number of locations: Duncansville, Pennsylvania; Juárez, Mexico
- Key people: Rob Herman (president); Nick Robinson (CEO); (2019)

North American Communications (NAC) was an American provider of direct mail services to high-volume marketers. NAC was co-founded by Michael Herman in 1979.

The company had two facilities, in Duncansville, Pennsylvania, and Ciudad Juárez, Mexico. The Duncansville site consisted of a 180,000 square feet (17,000 m^{2}) production facility.

The Mexico site closed in March 2019, while the US site closed on May 20, 2019. The sudden closure of the firm was in violation of the WARN Act, requiring at least 60 calendar days notification of closure for firms employing more than 100 people. The US and Mexican facilities employed between 175 and 270 (down from a peak of 700 in 2000), and 650 people, respectively.

The company collapsed as a consequence of several factors, one being unable to raise capital to support consolidation of its facilities to the Duncansville location, a move which stakeholders found to be necessary in the face of souring business and transit relations between the United States and Mexico. The inability to raise capital was compounded by an inability to merge or sell the company due to internecine litigation between NAC and the company's founder, litigation which also left the company unable to fund ongoing operations. Another factor contributing to the firm's collapse was a "prolonged contraction of client mail volumes".
