= Meridian, Pennsylvania =

Unincorporated community in Pennsylvania, US

- Census-designated place
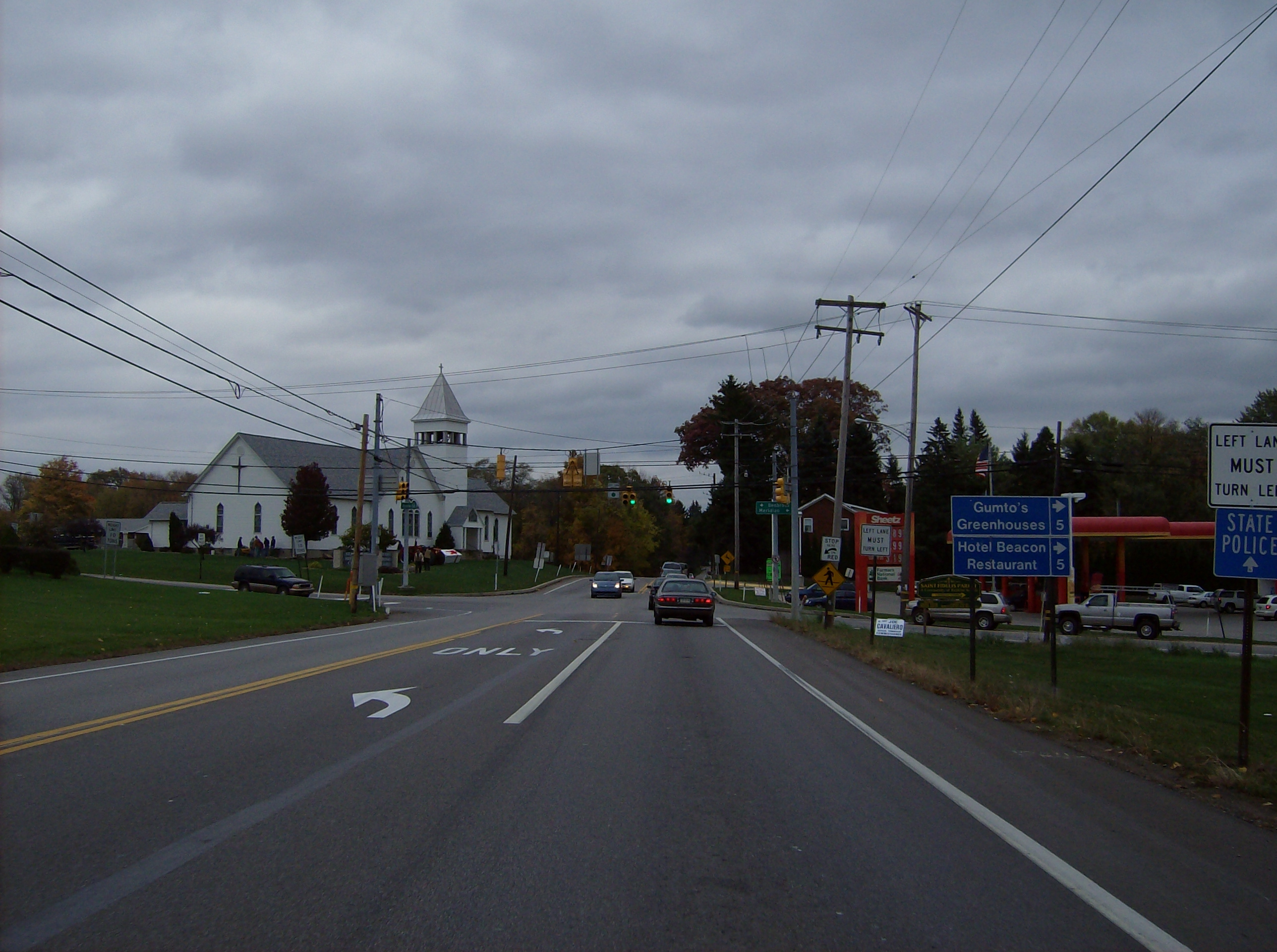
- Along Pennsylvania Route 68 in western Meridian

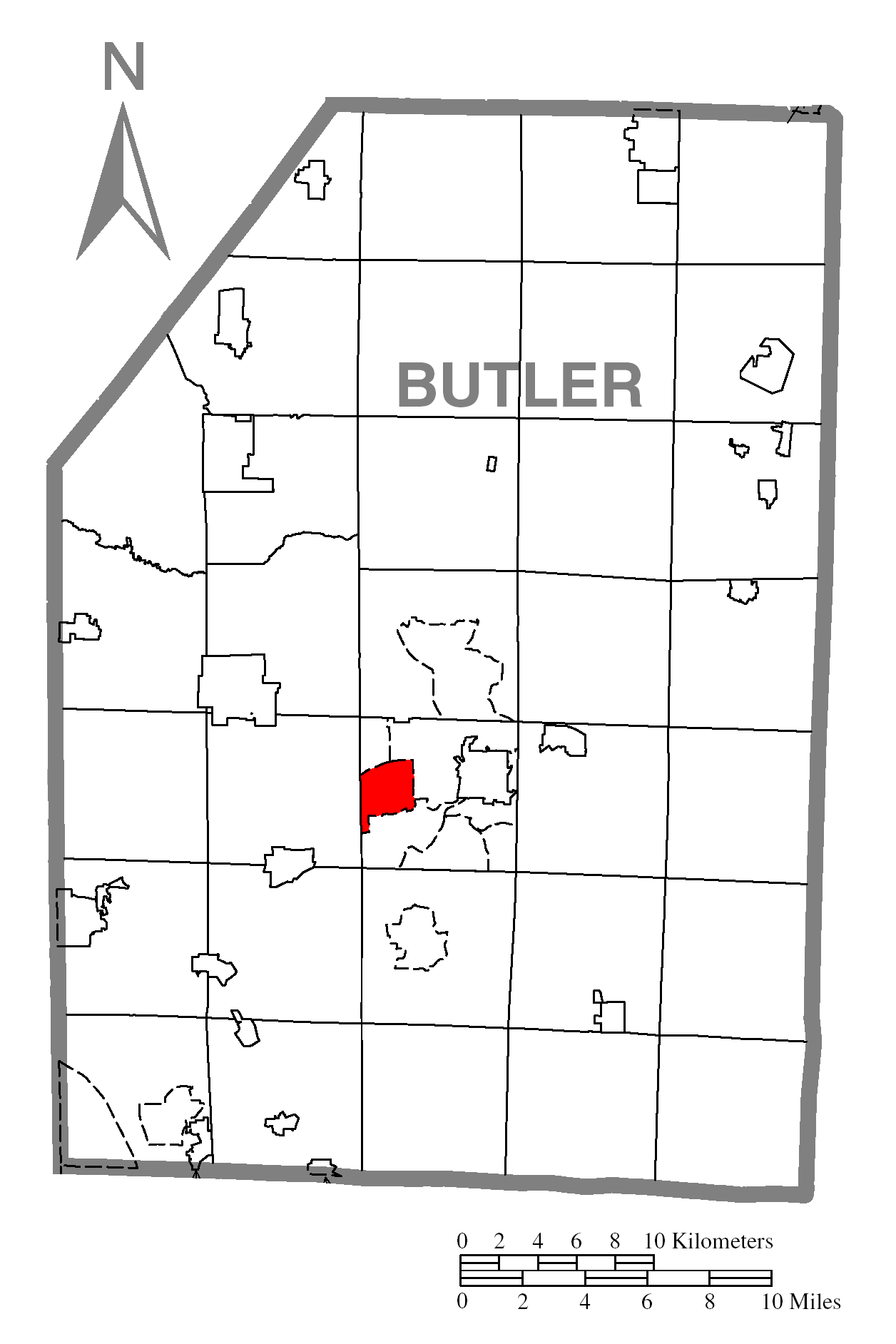
- Location within Butler County

- Location within the U.S. state of Pennsylvania Meridian (the United States)
- Coordinates: 40°51′16″N 79°57′23″W
- Country: United States
- State: Pennsylvania
- County: Butler
- Township: Butler

Area
  - Total: 2.82 sq mi (7.31 km^{2})
  - Land: 2.81 sq mi (7.29 km^{2})
  - Water: 0.0039 sq mi (0.01 km^{2})
- Elevation: 1,312 ft (400 m)

Population (2020)
  - Total: 3,760
  - Density: 1,334.9/sq mi (515.42/km^{2})
- Time zone: UTC-5 (Eastern (EST))
  - Summer (DST): UTC-4 (EDT)
- FIPS code: 42-48728

Meridian is a census-designated place (CDP) in Butler Township, Butler County, Pennsylvania, United States. The population was 3,881 at the 2010 census. Meridian was the site of an attempted assassination of 45th and 47th President of the United States Donald Trump in July 2024.

== History ==
Meridian was linked to Butler, Evans City and Pittsburgh in 1908 by the Pittsburgh, Harmony, Butler and New Castle Railway, an interurban trolley line. The line closed on June 15, 1931, and the trolleys were replaced by buses.

=== Attempted assassination of Donald Trump ===
The then former president Donald Trump was shot at during a campaign rally being held at the Butler Farm Show fairground, partly in Meridian, on July 13, 2024. Trump and at least two other attendees were injured in the attack and one attendee was killed. The attacker, Thomas Matthew Crooks, was then fatally shot by a Secret Service sniper. Trump later returned to the same Farm Show fairground for a second campaign rally on October 5, 2024.

== Geography ==
Meridian is located in the western part of Butler Township at 40°51′16″N 79°57′23″W (40.854415, −79.956359). It is bordered to the east and partly to the north by the Homeacre-Lyndora CDP. Pennsylvania Route 68 forms the northern edge of the Meridian CDP, leading east 4 miles (6 km) to downtown Butler and southwest 8 miles (13 km) to Evans City.

According to the United States Census Bureau, the CDP has a total area of 2.8 square miles (7.3 km^{2}), of which 0.004 square miles (0.01 km^{2}), or 0.16%, is water.

== Demographics ==
Historical population
Census	Pop.	Note	%±
2020	3,760		—
U.S. Decennial Census

=== 2020 census ===
As of the 2020 census, Meridian had a population of 3,760. The median age was 50.6 years. 18.6% of residents were under the age of 18 and 27.1% of residents were 65 years of age or older. For every 100 females there were 98.8 males, and for every 100 females age 18 and over there were 95.3 males age 18 and over.

100.0% of residents lived in urban areas, while 0.0% lived in rural areas.

There were 1,521 households in Meridian, of which 23.3% had children under the age of 18 living in them. Of all households, 61.4% were married-couple households, 13.1% were households with a male householder and no spouse or partner present, and 20.0% were households with a female householder and no spouse or partner present. About 24.2% of all households were made up of individuals and 14.4% had someone living alone who was 65 years of age or older.

There were 1,609 housing units, of which 5.5% were vacant. The homeowner vacancy rate was 1.6% and the rental vacancy rate was 7.1%.

Racial composition as of the 2020 census
Race	Number	Percent
White	3,585	95.3%
Black or African American	17	0.5%
American Indian and Alaska Native	4	0.1%
Asian	13	0.3%
Native Hawaiian and Other Pacific Islander	1	0.0%
Some other race	18	0.5%
Two or more races	122	3.2%
Hispanic or Latino (of any race)	54	1.4%

=== 2000 census ===
As of the 2000 census, there were 3,794 people, 1,489 households, and 1,137 families living in the CDP. The population density was 1,337.7 inhabitants per square mile (516.5/km^{2}). There were 1,524 housing units at an average density of 537.3 per square mile (207.5/km^{2}). The racial makeup of the CDP was 99.24% White, 0.18% African American, 0.08% Native American, 0.29% Asian, 0.08% Pacific Islander, and 0.13% from two or more races. Hispanic or Latino of any race were 0.37% of the population.

There were 1,489 households, out of which 28.0% had children under the age of 18 living with them, 67.7% were married couples living together, 6.2% had a female householder with no husband present, and 23.6% were non-families. 21.1% of all households were made up of individuals, and 11.5% had someone living alone who was 65 years of age or older. The average household size was 2.52 and the average family size was 2.93.

In the CDP the population was spread out, with 21.3% under the age of 18, 5.5% from 18 to 24, 25.1% from 25 to 44, 29.9% from 45 to 64, and 18.2% who were 65 years of age or older. The median age was 44 years. For every 100 females there were 96.9 males. For every 100 females age 18 and over, there were 93.8 males.

The median income for a household in the CDP was $48,939, and the median income for a family was $57,893. Males had a median income of $44,458 versus $27,933 for females. The per capita income for the CDP was $22,962. About 3.9% of families and 6.3% of the population were below the poverty line, including 2.3% of those under age 18 and 13.8% of those age 65 or over.

== Government ==
The Butler Township Police Department is the local law enforcement agency.

== Education ==
It is in the Butler Area School District. Butler Area Intermediate High School and Butler Area Senior High School are the district's comprehensive secondary schools.

The district formerly operated Meridian Elementary School, which closed in 2015.
