= Pennsylvania Route 764 =

State highway in Blair County, Pennsylvania, US

Pennsylvania Route 764

Route information
- Maintained by PennDOT
- Length: 11.40 mi (18.35 km)
- Existed: May 27, 1935–present

Major junctions
- South end: US 22 in Allegheny Township
- PA 36 in Altoona; US 220 Bus. near Altoona
- North end: I-99 / US 220 in Antis Township

Location
- Country: United States
- State: Pennsylvania
- Counties: Blair

Highway system
- Pennsylvania State Route System; Interstate; US; State; Scenic; Legislative
← PA 763	→ PA 766
← PA 263	→ PA 266

Pennsylvania Route 764 (PA 764) is a north–south state highway that is located in Blair County in the Commonwealth of Pennsylvania in the United States. This route is one of multiple, major north–south thoroughfares in Altoona.

It terminates south of the city near Duncansville, a suburb of Altoona, at an interchange with U.S. Route 22 (US 22). The northern terminus is located several miles north of Altoona, east of Pinecroft, at an interchange with Interstate 99 (I-99) and US 220, at exit 39.

== Route description ==
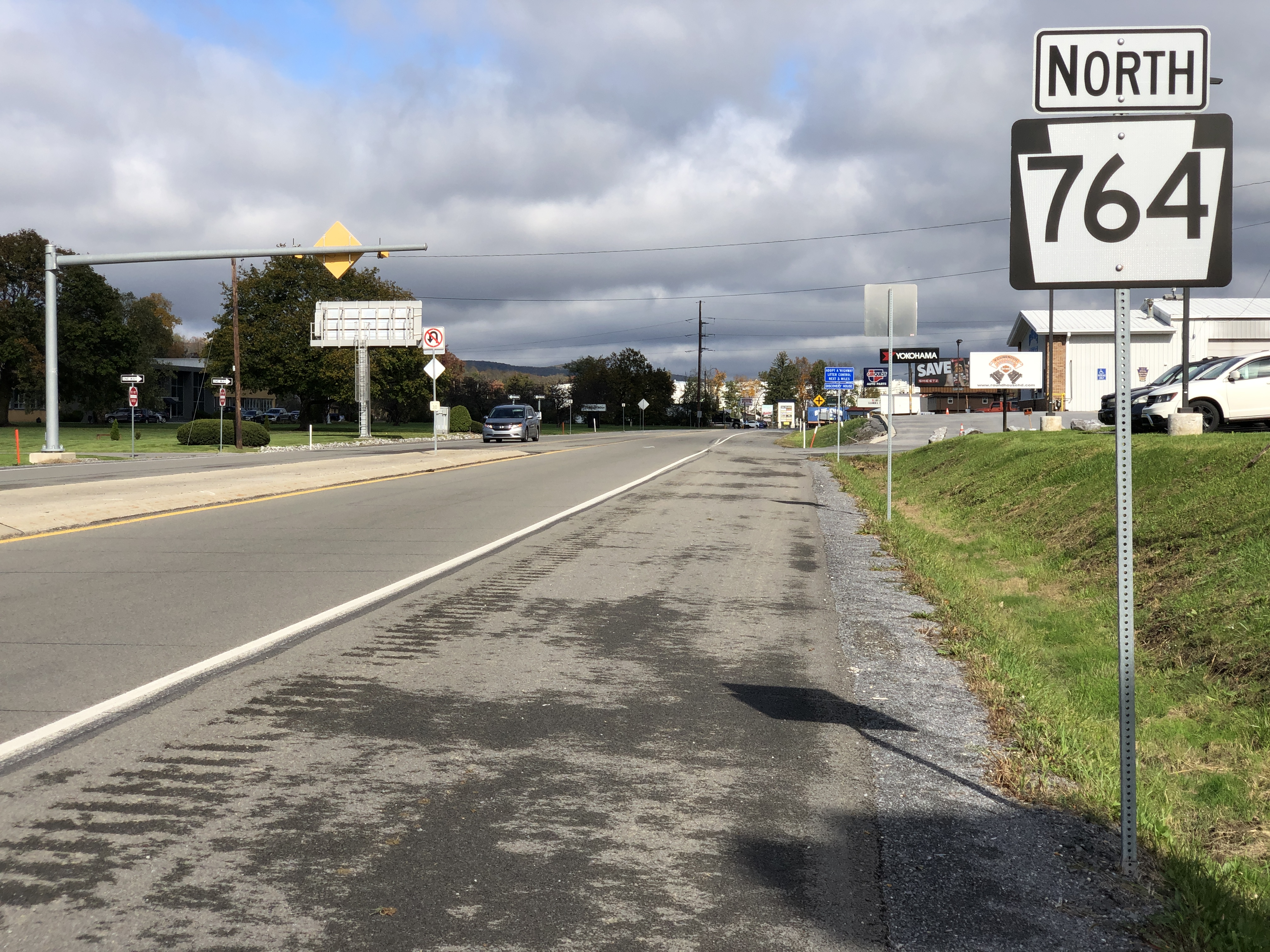
PA 764 northbound past US 22 in Allegheny Township

PA 764 begins in Allegheny Township at an interchange with US 22, south of downtown Altoona. The junction is composed of two trumpet-style interchanges connecting PA 764 with the US 22 freeway. To the south of the interchange, the surface road continues as US 22 to Duncansville.

From there, PA 764 is aligned north–south through the southern Altoona suburbs and small hamlets, running parallel to and west of I-99/US 220. Upon entering the city, PA 764 becomes 6th Avenue and begins intersecting numbered streets, starting with 58th Street and decreasing to lower numbers as one moves north. Approaching the downtown area, PA 764 splits into the 6th and 7th Avenue one-way pair and enters the commercial district of Altoona. 6th Avenue is mostly the boundary between the downtown and Dutch Hill (except near the school zones). The two pairs intersect Union Avenue (PA 36) near the heart of the city, around the edge of the downtown.

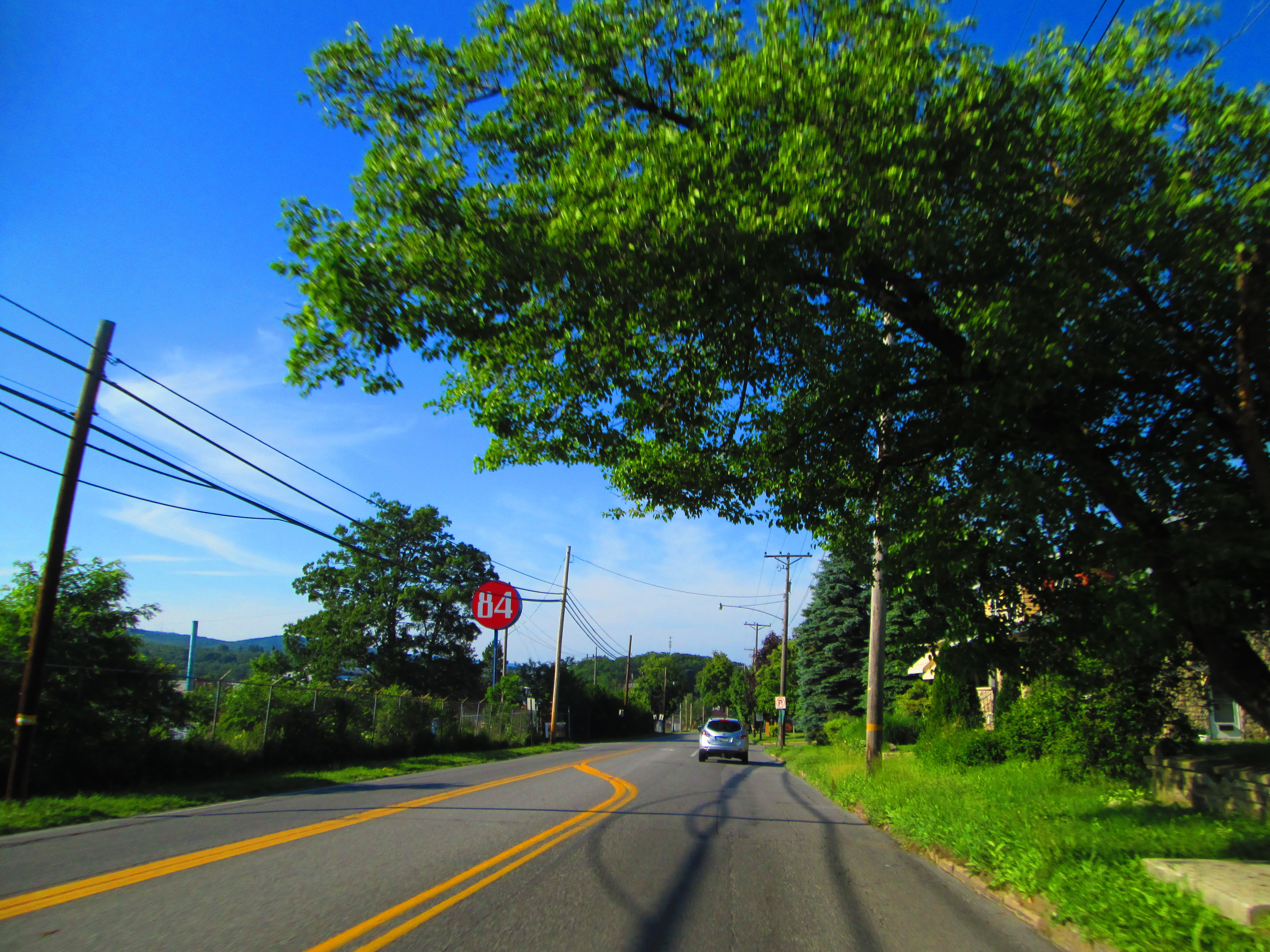
PA 764 south of Altoona

The PA 764 one-way couple remains parallel and separate for 2.4 miles (3.9 km), into the northern portions of Altoona. In the northern section of the city, the two pairs merge and turn right onto Lloyd Street, while Sixth Avenue Road continues to the north. PA 764 runs east on Lloyd Street for eight blocks, then turns north to become Walton Avenue. Outside of Altoona, PA 764 merges onto US 220 Business, to begin a long overlap with the route on Pleasant Valley Boulevard.

In Antis Township, east of Pinecroft, PA 764 leaves US 220 BUS to turn east. A short distance east of the overlap, PA 764 terminates at an interchange with I-99/US 220, at exit 39.

== History ==
Throughout much of its history, PA 764 was US 220 north of Altoona. This designation was in place from the 1940s to the 1990s. Before the bill was passed to build the highway that now carries U.S. 220 from Duncansville to Altoona, the current PA 764 was designated as PA 264, following the decommission of original PA 64.

== Major intersections ==
The entire route is in Blair County.

Location	mi	km	Destinations	Notes
Allegheny Township	0.00	0.00	US 22 (William Penn Highway) to I-99 – Ebensburg, Duncansville, Hollidaysburg	Interchange; southern terminus
Altoona	4.50	7.24	PA 36 (Union Avenue)	
Logan Township	8.08	13.00	US 220 Bus. south (Pleasant Valley Boulevard)	South end of US 220 Bus. overlap
Antis Township	10.85	17.46	US 220 Bus. north (Pleasant Valley Boulevard) – Bellwood	North end of US 220 Bus. overlap
Antis Township	11.40	18.35	I-99 / US 220 (Bud Shuster Highway) – Altoona, State College	Northern terminus; exit 39 on I-99
1.000 mi = 1.609 km; 1.000 km = 0.621 mi: Concurrency terminus
