= Cross Keys, Blair County, Pennsylvania =

Unincorporated community in Pennsylvania, US

Cross Keys, Pennsylvania
- Census-designated place
- Location within Pennsylvania Location within the United States
- Coordinates: 40°26′45″N 78°25′46″W
- Country: United States
- State: Pennsylvania
- County: Blair
- Township: Allegheny

Area
  - Total: 0.26 sq mi (0.68 km^{2})
  - Land: 0.26 sq mi (0.68 km^{2})
  - Water: 0 sq mi (0.00 km^{2})
- Elevation: 1,011 ft (308 m)

Population (2020)
  - Total: 435
  - Density: 1,656.9/sq mi (639.75/km^{2})
- Time zone: UTC-5 (Eastern (EST))
  - Summer (DST): UTC-4 (EDT)
- ZIP Code: 16635 (Duncansville)
- Area codes: 814/582
- FIPS code: 42-17368
- GNIS feature ID: 2805481

Cross Keys is an unincorporated community and census-designated place (CDP) in Blair County, Pennsylvania, United States. It was first listed as a CDP prior to the 2020 census.

== Geography ==
The CDP is in western Blair County, in the eastern part of Allegheny Township. It is bordered to the west by U.S. Route 22/Pennsylvania Route 764, to the south by the US-22/Interstate 99 interchange, and to the east by the Altoona–Hollidaysburg line of the Norfolk Southern Railway. Altoona is 6 miles (10 km) to the north, Duncansville is 2 miles (3 km) to the south, and Hollidaysburg is 3 miles (5 km) to the southeast.

Cross Keys is in the valley of Beaverdam Branch, which flows southeastward to join the Frankstown Branch of the Juniata River east of Hollidaysburg.

== Demographics ==
Historical population
Census	Pop.	Note	%±
2020	435		—
U.S. Decennial Census

== Education ==
The school district is Hollidaysburg Area School District.
