= Cuddy, Pennsylvania =

Unincorporated community in Pennsylvania, US

- Unincorporated community
- Location within the state of Pennsylvania Cuddy (the United States)
- Coordinates: 40°20′57″N 80°09′38″W
- Country: United States
- State: Pennsylvania
- County: Allegheny
- Township: South Fayette
- Elevation: 994 ft (303 m)
- Time zone: UTC-5 (Eastern (EST))
  - Summer (DST): UTC-4 (EDT)
- ZIP codes: 15031
- Area codes: 724, 878
- GNIS feature ID: 1172811

Cuddy (formerly Cuddy Hill, Morgan and Morgan Hill) is an unincorporated community in Allegheny County, Pennsylvania, United States. The community is served by the South Fayette Volunteer Fire Department. Cuddy has a post office, with the zip code 15031.
