= Cambridge, Pennsylvania =

- Unincorporated community Census designated place
- Location within Pennsylvania Location within the United States
- Coordinates: 40°4′51.6″N 75°56′13.2″W
- Country: United States
- State: Pennsylvania
- County: Chester and Lancaster
- Township: Honey Brook and Salisbury

Area
  - Total: 0.886 sq mi (2.29 km^{2})
  - Land: 0.000 sq mi (0 km^{2})
  - Water: 0.886 sq mi (2.29 km^{2})
- Time zone: UTC-5 (Eastern (EST))
  - Summer (DST): UTC-4 (EDT)
- FIPS code: 42-10908
- GNIS feature ID: 28-30763

Cambridge is an unincorporated community and census designated place (CDP) mostly in Salisbury Township, Lancaster County, Pennsylvania with a small portion extending into Honey Brook Township, Chester County, Pennsylvania.

== Demographics ==
Historical population
| Census | Pop. | Note | %± |
|---|---|---|---|
U.S. Decennial Census

The United States Census Bureau first defined Cambridge as a census designated place in 2023.
