= Cool Valley, Pennsylvania =

Unincorporated community in Pennsylvania, US

- Unincorporated community
- Location within Pennsylvania
- Coordinates: 40°17′23″N 80°09′23″W
- Country: United States
- State: Pennsylvania
- County: Washington
- Elevation: 1,014 ft (309 m)
- Time zone: UTC-5 (Eastern (EST))
  - Summer (DST): UTC-4 (EDT)
- Area code: 724
- GNIS feature ID: 1203331

Cool Valley is an unincorporated community in Cecil Township, Washington County, Pennsylvania, United States. Cool Valley is located along Morganza Road 2.5 miles (4.0 km) northeast of Canonsburg.
