= Coon Hunter, Pennsylvania =

Unincorporated community in Pennsylvania, US

Coon Hunter
- Unincorporated community
- Location within the state of Pennsylvania Coon Hunter (the United States)
- Coordinates: 40°46′33″N 77°3′18″W
- Country: United States
- State: Pennsylvania
- County: Snyder
- Elevation: 522 ft (159 m)
- Time zone: UTC-5 (Eastern (EST))
  - Summer (DST): UTC-4 (EDT)
- GNIS feature ID: 1172410

Coon Hunter is an unincorporated community in Snyder County, Pennsylvania, United States.
