= Curtin, Pennsylvania =

Unincorporated community in US

Coordinates: 40°35′6.31″N 76°50′56.90″W

Curtin is an unincorporated community in Mifflin Township in Dauphin County, Pennsylvania.

It is part of the Harrisburg–Carlisle metropolitan statistical area and lies within ZIP Code 17061. but uses the Millersburg post office. Curtin is located on Pennsylvania Route 25, 2.2 miles to the west of Berrysburg, Pennsylvania.

Curtin is officially named as Cartin in the United States Geological Survey and on federal maps.

== History ==
A post office called Curtin was established in 1863 remained in operation until 1905.

Curtin was named for governor Andrew Gregg Curtin.
