= Cracker Jack, Pennsylvania =

Unincorporated community in Pennsylvania, US

- Unincorporated community
- Location within Pennsylvania
- Coordinates: 40°10′03″N 79°57′52″W
- Country: United States
- State: Pennsylvania
- County: Washington
- Elevation: 846 ft (258 m)
- Time zone: UTC-5 (Eastern (EST))
  - Summer (DST): UTC-4 (EDT)
- Area code: 724
- GNIS feature ID: 1172587

Cracker Jack is an unincorporated community in Carroll Township, Washington County, Pennsylvania, United States. Cracker Jack is located on Pigeon Creek 3.2 miles (5.1 km) southwest of Monongahela.
