= Coder, Pennsylvania =

Unincorporated community in Pennsylvania, US

Coordinates: 41°08′41″N 79°06′48″W

Coder is an unincorporated community in Jefferson County, Pennsylvania, United States. It sits at an elevation of 1,276 feet (389 m).

== Notable personal ==
- Rube Bressler, major-league baseball player, was born in Coder in 1894.
