= Cherry Grove Township, Warren County, Pennsylvania =

Township in Pennsylvania, United States

Coordinates: 41°40′00″N 79°07′59″W

Cherry Grove Township
- Township
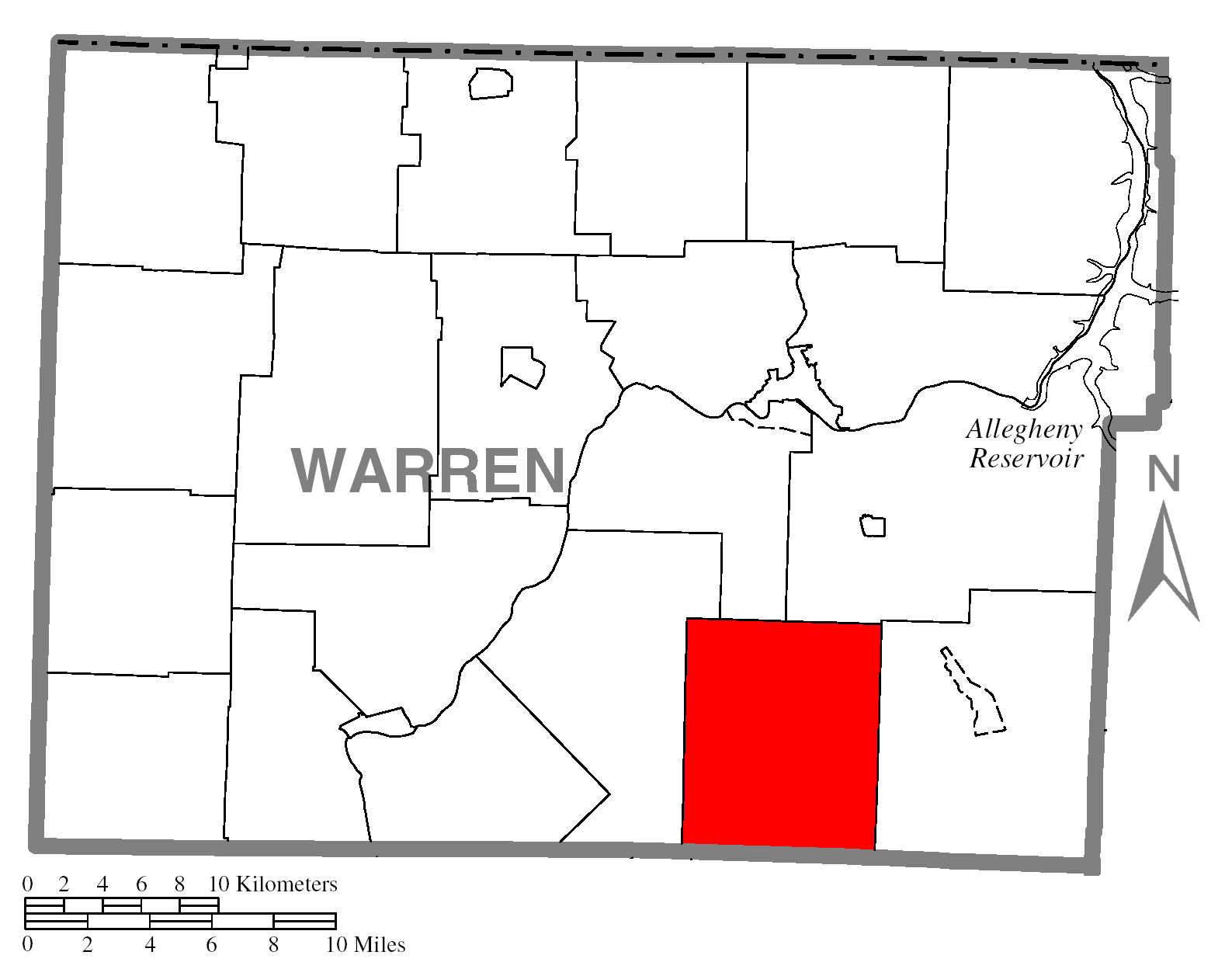
- Location of Cherry Grove Township in Warren County

- Location of Warren County in Pennsylvania
- Country: United States
- State: Pennsylvania
- County: Warren

Area
  - Total: 46.27 sq mi (119.84 km^{2})
  - Land: 46.27 sq mi (119.84 km^{2})
  - Water: 0 sq mi (0.00 km^{2})

Population (2020)
  - Total: 173
  - Estimate (2024): 166
  - Density: 4.5/sq mi (1.74/km^{2})
- Time zone: UTC-4 (EST)
  - Summer (DST): UTC-5 (EDT)
- Area code: 814
- FIPS code: 42-123-13056

Cherry Grove Township is a township in Warren County, Pennsylvania, United States. The population at the 2020 census was 173, down from 216 in the 2010 census.

== Geography ==
According to the United States Census Bureau, the township has a total area of 46.9 square miles (121 km^{2}), for all land.

== Demographics ==
Historical population
Census	Pop.	Note	%±
2000	228		—
2010	216		−5.3%
2020	173		−19.9%
2024 (est.)	166		−4.0%
U.S. Decennial Census

As of the census of 2000, there were 228 people, 92 households, and 72 families residing in the township. The population density was 4.9 people per square mile (1.9/km^{2}). There were 368 housing units at an average density of 7.8/sq mi (3.0/km^{2}). The racial makeup of the township was 100.00% White.

There were 92 households, out of which 23.9% had children under the age of 18 living with them, 66.3% were married couples living together, 7.6% had a female householder with no husband present, and 21.7% were non-families. 21.7% of all households were made up of individuals, and 5.4% had someone living alone who was 65 years of age or older. The average household size was 2.48 and the average family size was 2.82.

In the township the population was spread out, with 20.6% under the age of 18, 5.7% from 18 to 24, 25.9% from 25 to 44, 30.7% from 45 to 64, and 17.1% who were 65 years of age or older. The median age was 42 years. For every 100 females, there were 115.1 males. For every 100 females age 18 and over, there were 108.0 males.

The median income for a household in the township was $35,625, and the median income for a family was $40,313. Males had a median income of $35,625 versus $18,125 for females. The per capita income for the township was $15,628. About 7.8% of families and 5.8% of the population were below the poverty line, including 4.5% of those under the age of eighteen and none of those 65 or over.
