= Connoquenessing, Pennsylvania =

Borough in Pennsylvania, US

- Borough
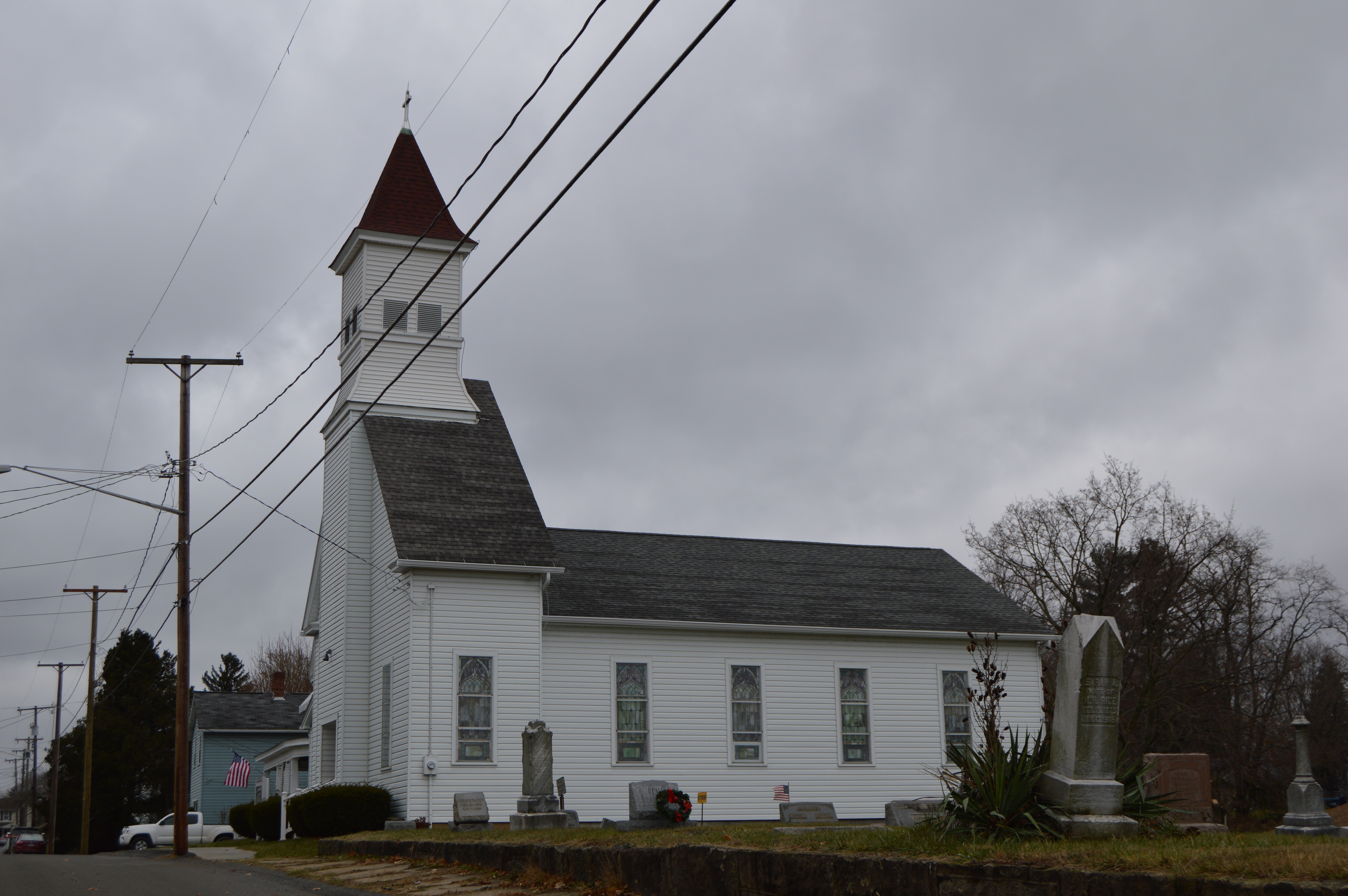
- St. Paul's United Church of Christ

- Flag
- Motto: "A Long Way Straight"
- Location of Connoquenessing in Butler County, Pennsylvania.

- Location within Pennsylvania
- Coordinates: 40°49′05″N 80°00′49″W
- Country: United States
- State: Pennsylvania
- County: Butler
- Settled: 1795
- Incorporated: 1848

Government
  - Type: Borough Council

Area
  - Total: 1.36 sq mi (3.51 km^{2})
  - Land: 1.36 sq mi (3.51 km^{2})
  - Water: 0 sq mi (0.00 km^{2})

Population (2020)
  - Total: 668
  - Density: 492.9/sq mi (190.32/km^{2})
- Time zone: UTC-5 (Eastern (EST))
  - Summer (DST): UTC-4 (EDT)
- Zip code: 16027
- FIPS code: 42-15808
- Website: connoquenessingboro.com

Connoquenessing is a borough in Butler County, Pennsylvania, United States. As of the 2020 census, Connoquenessing had a population of 668.

== Geography ==
Connoquenessing is located southwest of the center of Butler County at 40°49′5″N 80°0′49″W (40.818096, −80.013708). It is bordered by Connoquenessing Township to the north, east, and west, and by Forward Township to the south, east, and west. The borough takes its name from Connoquenessing Creek, a Beaver River tributary which flows through a valley just south of the borough.

Pennsylvania Route 68 passes through the borough, leading northeast 8 miles (13 km) to Butler, the county seat, and southwest 4.6 miles (7.4 km) to Evans City.

According to the United States Census Bureau, the borough has a total area of 1.4 square miles (3.5 km^{2}), all land.

== Demographics ==
Historical population
Census	Pop.	Note	%±
1900	343		—
1910	400		16.6%
1920	430		7.5%
1930	406		−5.6%
1940	441		8.6%
1950	441		0.0%
1960	513		16.3%
1970	553		7.8%
1980	539		−2.5%
1990	507		−5.9%
2000	564		11.2%
2010	528		−6.4%
2020	668		26.5%

As of the 2000 census, there were 564 people, 199 households, and 161 families residing in the borough. The population density was 395.4 inhabitants per square mile (152.7/km^{2}). There were 204 housing units at an average density of 143.0 per square mile (55.2/km^{2}). The racial makeup of the borough was 99.29% White, 0.18% African American, 0.18% Native American, and 0.35% from two or more races. Hispanic or Latino of any race were 1.42% of the population.

There were 199 households, out of which 41.2% had children under the age of 18 living with them, 71.4% were married couples living together, 9.0% had a female householder with no husband present, and 18.6% were non-families. 14.6% of all households were made up of individuals, and 7.5% had someone living alone who was 65 years of age or older. The average household size was 2.83 and the average family size was 3.18.

In the borough the population was spread out, with 28.5% under the age of 18, 6.4% from 18 to 24, 31.9% from 25 to 44, 21.3% from 45 to 64, and 11.9% who were 65 years of age or older. The median age was 35 years. For every 100 females there were 100.0 males. For every 100 females age 18 and over, there were 91.9 males.

The median income for a household in the borough was $43,864, and the median income for a family was $48,000. Males had a median income of $40,268 versus $28,611 for females. The per capita income for the borough was $17,111. About 4.1% of families and 6.7% of the population were below the poverty line, including 5.9% of those under age 18 and 15.5% of those age 65 or over.

== Government ==
The Connoquenessing Valley Regional Emergency Management Agency (EMA) is the disaster management agency of the borough.

== Education ==
It is in the Butler Area School District.

The district operates Connoquenessing Elementary School, in Connoquenessing Township. Butler Area Intermediate High School and Butler Area Senior High School are the district's comprehensive secondary schools.
