= Connoquenessing Township, Pennsylvania =

Township in Pennsylvania, US

Coordinates: 40°52′36″N 80°02′29″W

- Township
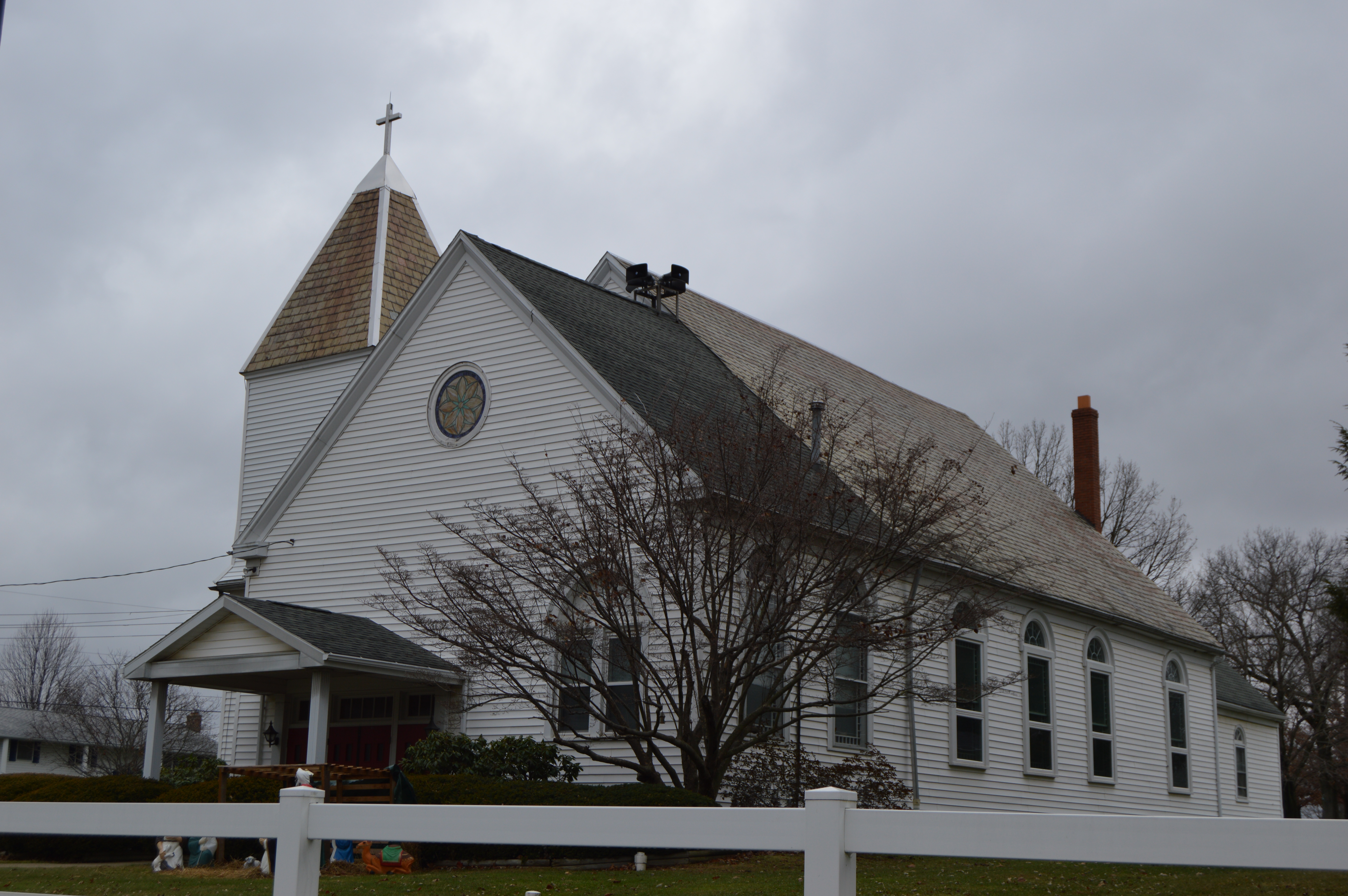
- White Oak Springs Presbyterian Church

- Flag Seal

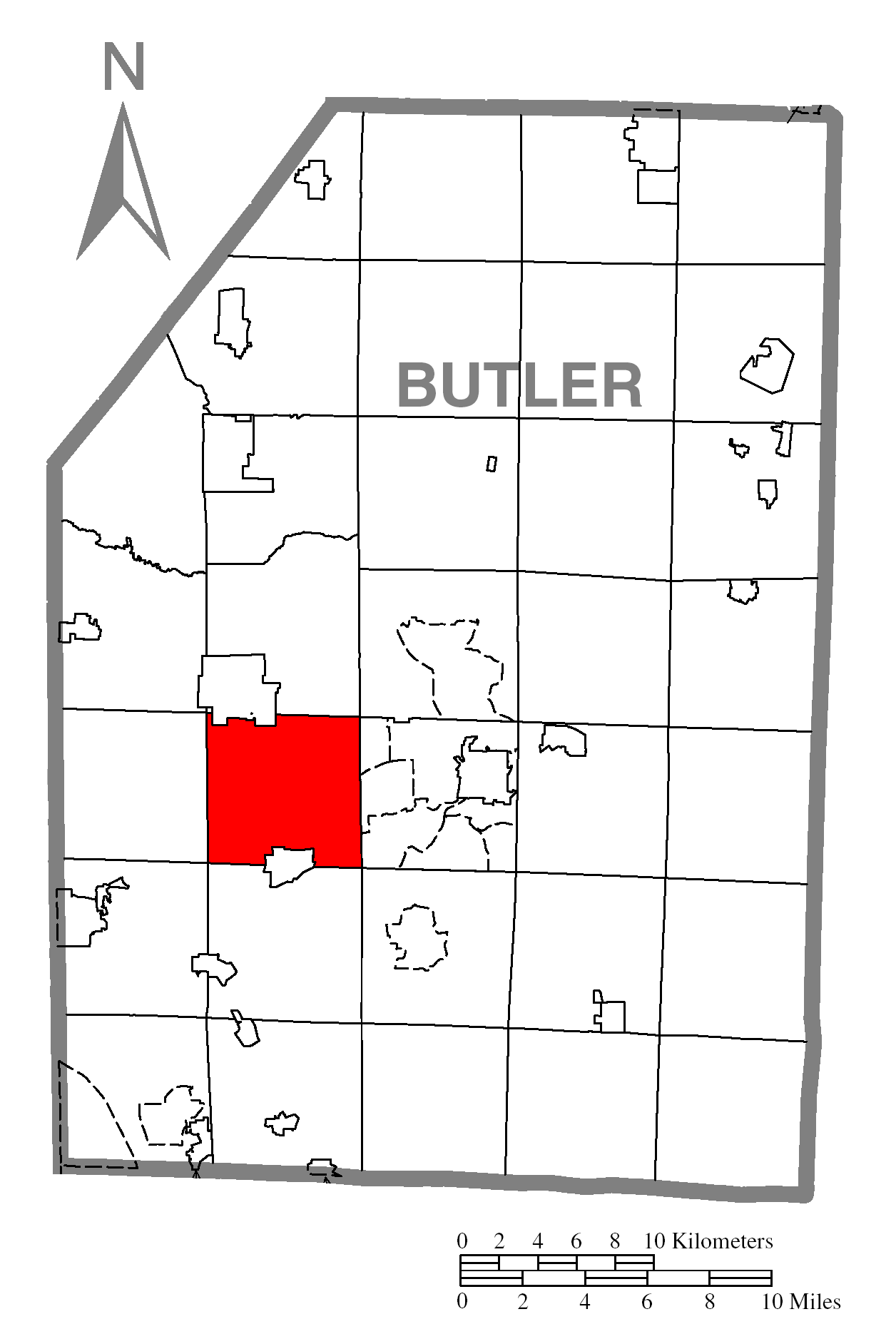
- Map of Butler County, Pennsylvania, highlighting Connoquenessing Township

- Map of Butler County, Pennsylvania
- Country: United States
- State: Pennsylvania
- County: Butler
- Settled: 1795
- Incorporated: 1804

Area
  - Total: 22.74 sq mi (58.90 km^{2})
  - Land: 22.73 sq mi (58.88 km^{2})
  - Water: 0.0077 sq mi (0.02 km^{2})

Population (2020)
  - Total: 4,265 ▲
  - Estimate (2022): 4,158
  - Density: 174.9/sq mi (67.53/km^{2})
- Time zone: UTC-5 (Eastern (EST))
  - Summer (DST): UTC-4 (EDT)
- FIPS code: 42-019-15816
- Website: connotwp.net

Connoquenessing Township is a township in Butler County, Pennsylvania, United States. The population was 4,265 at the 2020 census.

== History ==
=== Attempted assassination of George Washington ===
Connoquenessing is known as the area in which George Washington was nearly shot by his French Indian guide. On December 27, 1753, just past Murthering Town, a Native American allied with the French (French Indian) joined Washington and Christopher Gist as a guide. The guide's behavior grew increasingly suspicious, causing Washington and Gist to become uneasy. As the party approached a clearing, the Indian suddenly stopped, turned towards Washington and Gist, and fired his musket. The shot, taken no more than 15 steps away, narrowly missed both men. They subdued the attacker and released him by 9 o'clock that evening. They then built a fire as if staying for first light, but Washington and Gist continued on throughout the night on the Venango trail (now part of Franklin Road and Route 528). Almost certain the French Indian would follow their tracks at daybreak, they thought it best to get a head start. A monument pillar stands at the Connoquenessing Municipal building dedicated to this incident.

=== Trolley service ===
The township was linked to Butler, Evans City and Pittsburgh in 1908 by the Pittsburgh, Harmony, Butler and New Castle Railway, an interurban trolley line. The line closed on June 15, 1931, and the trolleys were replaced by buses.

=== Attempted assassination of Donald Trump ===
The Pennsylvania State Police, which serves as the local law enforcement agency of Connoquenessing Township, provided coverage of a Donald Trump rally held on July 13, 2024 at the Butler Farm Show Grounds; the majority of that venue is located in Connoquenessing Township. The attempted assassination of Donald Trump occurred at that event. Trump was located in the Butler Township side when the attempt occurred.

== Geography ==
Connoquenessing Township is located in west-central Butler County, on the western edge of Butler Township and just west of the city of Butler, the county seat. The borough of Connoquenessing borders the township on the south, and the borough of Prospect borders it on the north.

According to the United States Census Bureau, the township has a total area of 22.7 square miles (58.9 km^{2}), of which 0.008 square miles (0.02 km^{2}), or 0.04%, is water.

== Demographics ==
Historical population
Census	Pop.	Note	%±
2010	4,170		—
2020	4,265		2.3%
2022 (est.)	4,158		−2.5%
U.S. Decennial Census

As of the 2000 census, there were 3,653 people, 1,386 households, and 1,056 families residing in the township. The population density was 162.7 inhabitants per square mile (62.8/km^{2}). There were 1,458 housing units at an average density of 64.9 per square mile (25.1/km^{2}). The racial makeup of the township was 99.10% White, 0.11% African American, 0.14% Native American, 0.25% Asian, 0.03% Pacific Islander, 0.14% from other races, and 0.25% from two or more races. Hispanic or Latino of any race were 0.47% of the population.

There were 1,386 households, out of which 35.2% had children under the age of 18 living with them, 65.7% were married couples living together, 6.9% had a female householder with no husband present, and 23.8% were non-families. 20.6% of all households were made up of individuals, and 6.9% had someone living alone who was 65 years of age or older. The average household size was 2.64 and the average family size was 3.06.

In the township the population was spread out, with 26.1% under the age of 18, 6.1% from 18 to 24, 31.5% from 25 to 44, 25.7% from 45 to 64, and 10.6% who were 65 years of age or older. The median age was 37 years. For every 100 females there were 102.5 males. For every 100 females age 18 and over, there were 102.6 males.

The median income for a household in the township was $41,060, and the median income for a family was $45,429. Males had a median income of $36,696 versus $27,460 for females. The per capita income for the township was $19,502. About 5.7% of families and 7.6% of the population were below the poverty line, including 12.5% of those under age 18 and 8.4% of those age 65 or over.

== Government ==
The Connoquenessing Valley Regional Emergency Management Agency (EMA) is the disaster management agency of the township.

Pennsylvania State Police provides law enforcement services. The specific division covering the township is Troop D; Butler Township houses the police station of that troop.

Station 12 of the Connoquenessing Volunteer Fire Company provides firefighting services.

Butler Ambulance Service Company provides emergency medical services (EMS) to the majority of the township, with Harmony EMS covering the remainder.

== Education ==
The school district is Butler Area School District. The district operates Connoquenessing Elementary School, in the township. Butler Area Intermediate High School and Butler Area Senior High School are the district's comprehensive secondary schools.

== Transportation ==
Butler Farm Show Airport is in the township.
