= Duncansville, Pennsylvania =

Borough in Pennsylvania, US

- Borough
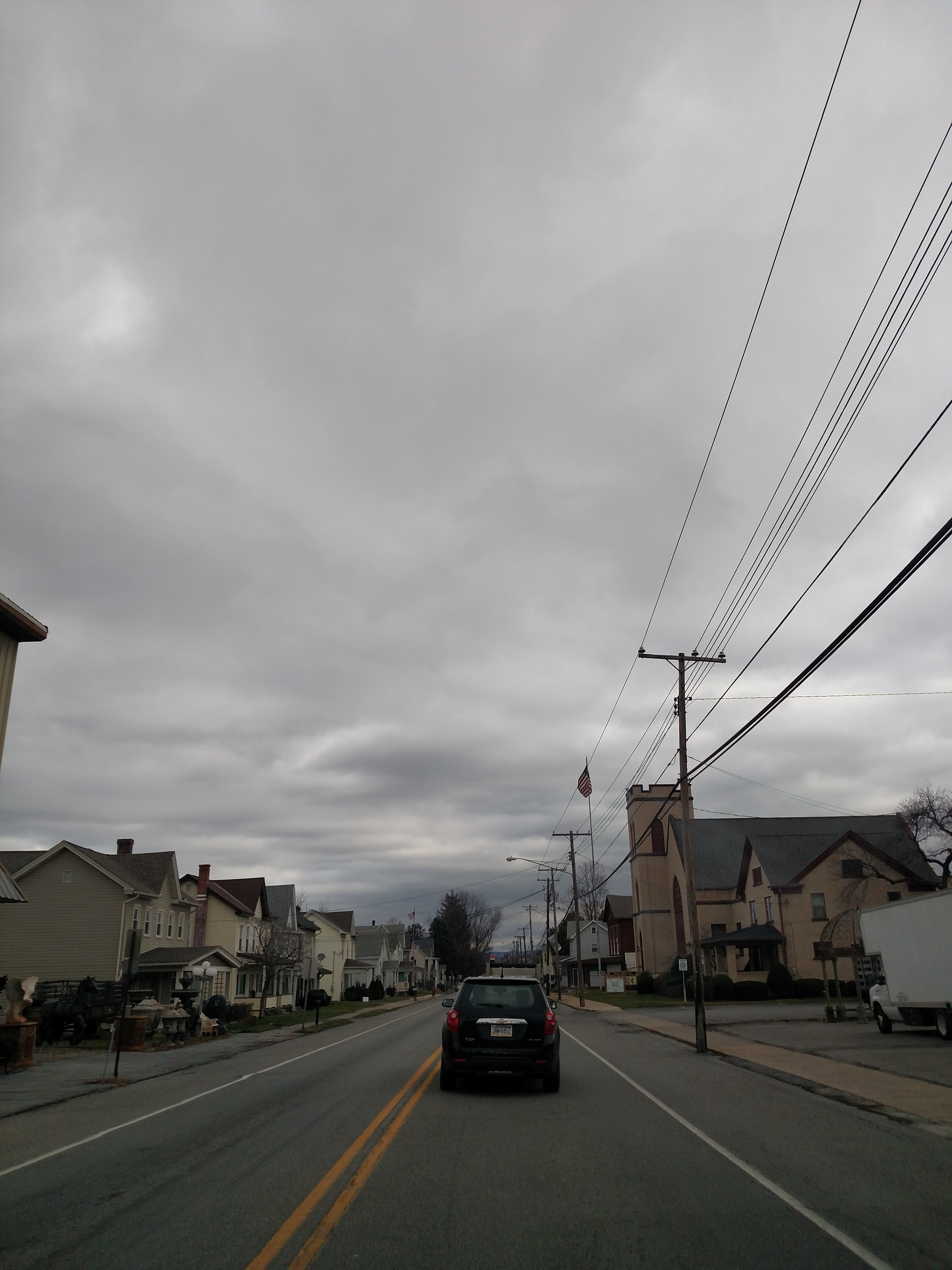
- US 22 (3rd Avenue) eastbound in Duncansville

- Location of Duncansville in Blair County, Pennsylvania

- Location in Pennsylvania Location in the United States
- Coordinates: 40°25′30″N 78°25′57″W
- Country: United States
- State: Pennsylvania
- County: Blair County
- Founded: 1831

Government
  - Mayor: Eric Fritz

Area
  - Total: 0.53 sq mi (1.38 km^{2})
  - Land: 0.53 sq mi (1.38 km^{2})
  - Water: 0 sq mi (0.00 km^{2})
- Elevation: 1,011 ft (308 m)

Population (2020)
  - Total: 1,255
  - Density: 2,357.3/sq mi (910.16/km^{2})
- Time zone: UTC-4 (EST)
  - Summer (DST): UTC-5 (EDT)
- ZIP Code: 16635
- Area code: 814
- FIPS code: 42-20248
- GNIS feature ID: 1214941
- Website: duncansvillepa.gov

Duncansville is a borough in Blair County, Pennsylvania, United States. It is part of the Altoona, Pennsylvania metropolitan statistical area. The population was 1,258 at the 2020 census.

== Geography ==
According to the United States Census Bureau, the borough has a total area of 0.5 square miles (1.3 km^{2}), all of which is land.

== Demographics ==
Historical population
| Census | Pop. | Note | %± |
|---|---|---|---|
| 1890 | 1,277 | | — |
| 1900 | 1,512 | | 18.4% |
| 1910 | 1,263 | | −16.5% |
| 1920 | 1,230 | | −2.6% |
| 1930 | 1,379 | | 12.1% |
| 1940 | 1,415 | | 2.6% |
| 1950 | 1,391 | | −1.7% |
| 1960 | 1,396 | | 0.4% |
| 1970 | 1,427 | | 2.2% |
| 1980 | 1,355 | | −5.0% |
| 1990 | 1,309 | | −3.4% |
| 2000 | 1,238 | | −5.4% |
| 2010 | 1,233 | | −0.4% |
| 2020 | 1,255 | | 1.8% |
| 2021 (est.) | 1,245 | ▼ | −0.8% |

At the 2000 census there were 1,238 people, 580 households, and 338 families residing in the borough. The population density was 2,312.5 inhabitants per square mile (892.9/km^{2}). There were 610 housing units at an average density of 1,139.4 per square mile (439.9/km^{2}). The racial makeup of the borough was 98.47% White, 0.48% African American, 0.08% Asian, 0.08% from other races, and 0.89% from two or more races. Hispanic or Latino of any race were 0.48%.

There were 580 households, 19.5% had children under the age of 18 living with them, 44.0% were married couples living together, 10.2% had a female householder with no husband present, and 41.7% were non-families. 38.3% of households were made up of individuals, and 21.7% were one person aged 65 or older. The average household size was 2.13 and the average family size was 2.84.

In the borough the population was spread out, with 17.7% under the age of 18, 8.1% from 18 to 24, 26.3% from 25 to 44, 24.9% from 45 to 64, and 23.0% 65 or older. The median age was 44 years. For every 100 females there were 77.1 males. For every 100 females age 18 and over, there were 75.4 males.

The median household income was $31,532 and the median family income was $40,655. Males had a median income of $27,298 versus $22,356 for females. The per capita income for the borough was $16,344. About 6.6% of families and 10.9% of the population were below the poverty line, including 9.6% of those under age 18 and 16.8% of those age 65 or over.

== History ==
In 1830, Samuel Duncan, recognizing the excellent possibilities for land development, purchased land on the western banks of the stream which traversed the area and plotted a town, which he named Duncansville. About the same time, Jacob Walters laid out plots of land on the eastern side of the stream and called his settlement Walterstown. Confusion and some rivalry existed between the two settlements. Both Duncan and Walters agreed that a common name should be used for the two places. They decided to cast lots to select the name to be used. The people of both settlements declared a holiday and arranged quite a celebration for the occasion. All assembled at the wooden bridge separating the two towns. A coin was tossed and fortune favored Duncan, thereby uniting the two communities under the name of Duncansville.

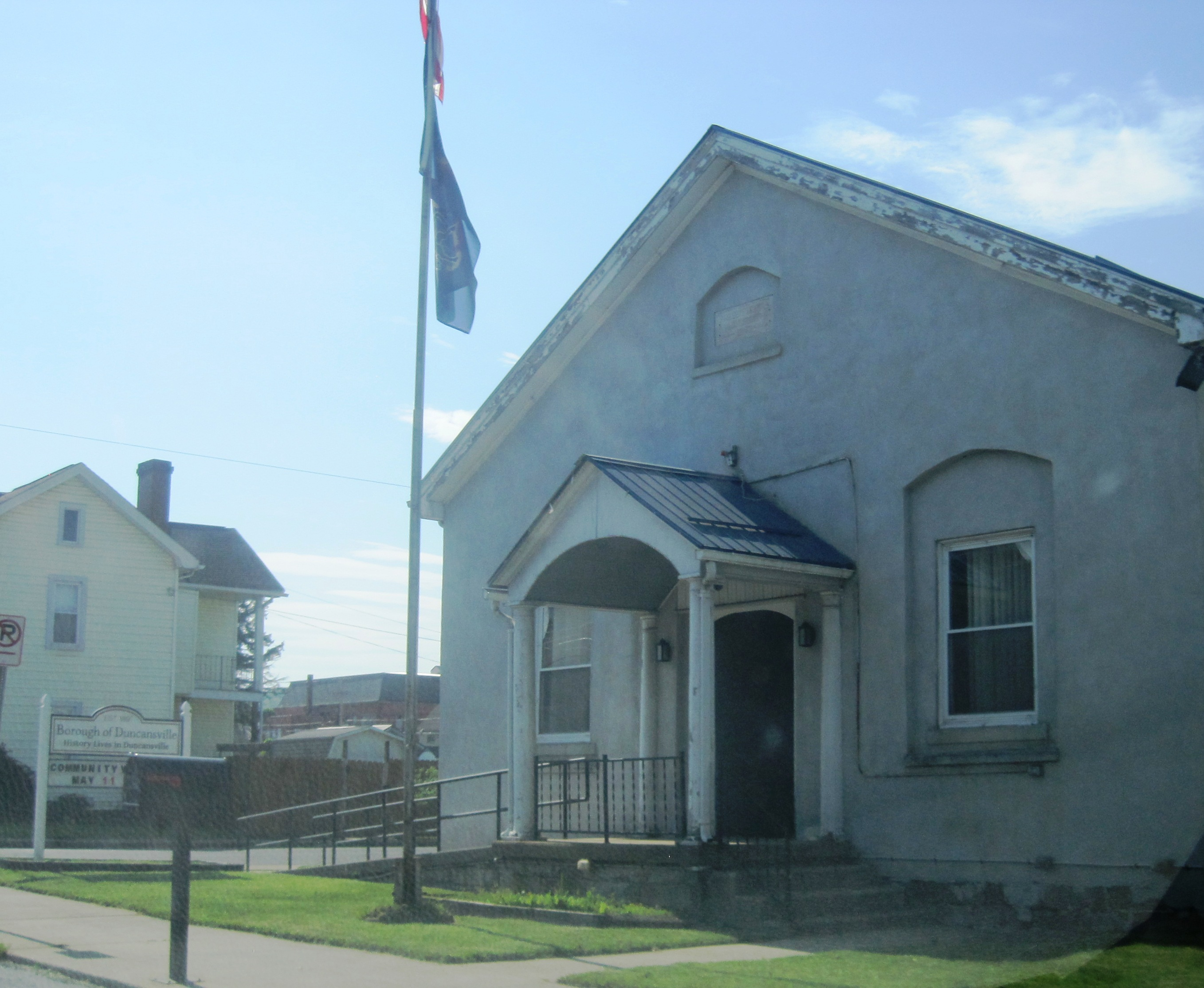
Duncansville Borough Hall

== Education ==
The school district is Hollidaysburg Area School District.

== Notable business ==
- North American Communications - defunct 2019
