= North Country Trail by state =

Map of the North Country Trail in the contiguous United States

The North Country National Scenic Trail spans eight U.S. states over its roughly 4,800 miles (7,700 km), traveling through North Dakota, Minnesota, Wisconsin, Michigan, Ohio, Pennsylvania, New York, and Vermont. The western end is at Lake Sakakawea State Park in North Dakota, and the eastern end is at a junction with the Appalachian Trail in Vermont's Green Mountain National Forest. As of 2023, most of the trail is in place, though about one-third of the distance consists of road walking; those segments are frequently evaluated by the North Country Trail Association for transfer to off-road segments on nearby public or private lands.

The route of the North Country Trail is described here from west to east. Along its total distance, the NCT traverses more than 150 public land units, including parks, forests, scenic attractions, wildlife refuges, game areas, and historic sites. Included at the federal level are ten National Forests, four units of the National Park system, and two National Wildlife Refuges. The trail also visits dozens of state parks, forests, gamelands, and historic areas, and several local/county forests and parks.

== North Dakota ==
Counties crossed: Mercer County → McLean County → Sherdian County → Burleigh County → Sherdian County → Wells County → Eddy County → Foster County → Griggs County → Steele County → Griggs County → Barnes County → Ransom County → Richland County

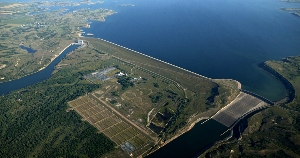
The North Country Trail begins near Garrison Dam at Lake Sakakawea State Park, North Dakota

The North Country Trail spends about 453 miles (729 km) in North Dakota. The trail begins at Lake Sakakawea State Park in Mercer County, following footpaths in the state park (including a junction with the Lewis and Clark Trail and a crossing of US Highway 83) and then a series of roads until reaching the shore of Lake Audubon (a branch of Lake Sakakawea) and the Audubon National Wildlife Refuge. The trail is then on rural roads for a considerable distance through McLean and Sheridan Counties, visiting several lakes including Turtle Lake and the Chain of Lakes Recreation Area. Starting in Burleigh County it walks alongside most of the 73-mile-long (117 km) McClusky Canal, followed by a trail through Lone Tree Wildlife Management Area (North Dakota's largest).

The trail continues through Sheyenne Lake National Wildlife Refuge, follows the valley of the Sheyenne River for a considerable distance, then crosses US Highway 52 (US 52) near the town of Harvey in Wells County. The first of five overall crossings of North Dakota Highway 9 (ND 9) is found near the town of Bremen, and the trail passes through New Rockford in Eddy County, where it also crosses US 281. The NCT next passes through the towns of McHenry and Binford, where it joins ND 65 for several miles. The trail then trends to the southeast via several turns on southbound and eastbound rural roads, and passes through residential areas in Cooperstown, after which it joins ND 200 for a few miles.

In Griggs County, the NCT turns south and follows the valley of the Sheyenne River again. A brief walk along ND 22 is followed by a lengthy route along the shores of Lake Ashtabula. Still traveling south, the NCT walks through Valley City and uses a local street to pass under Interstate 94 (I-94). The trail reaches Clausen Springs Wildlife Management Area and turns back to the east. The trail passes through the small village of Kathryn in Barnes County then turns south again and walks through Fort Ransom State Park, followed by the wildlife management area and town of the same name. Now trending to the southeast, the NCT walks through Lisbon in Ransom County, after which it turns primarily to the east then northeast and spends about 33 miles (53 km) on footpaths and old roads in Sheyenne National Grassland. The NCT then joins a series of rural roads and walks through the towns Walcott and Colfax in Richland County. Shortly after Colfax the trail uses a rural road to pass over I-29, and then it reaches Abercrombie where it follows ND 4 over the Red River and into Minnesota.

== Minnesota ==
Counties crossed: Wilkin County, Minnesota → Otter Tail County → Becker County → Clearwater County → Becker County → Clearwater County → Hubbard County → Cass County → Itasca County → St. Louis County → Lake County → Cook County → Lake County → St. Louis County → (The following counies are traversed along the Wisconsin border) Carlton County

The North Country Trail spends about 869 miles (1,399 km) in Minnesota; this includes about 559 miles (900 km) of the official NCT route, after which it joins the preexisting Superior Hiking Trail for a further 310 miles (499 km). After entering Minnesota at the Red River, the NCT joins a long series of rural roads and soon passes through the town of Kent, after which it walks briefly on US 75. The trail turns southeast at Rothsay; in western Otter Trail County it uses a rural road to cross I-94, US 59, and the Pelican River in close succession. The NCT then walks through residential and commercial areas in Fergus Falls, the largest city it has yet visited, and then proceeds via footpaths through Prairie Wetlands Learning Center and Delagoon Recreation Area. The trail then makes a U-turn to the north and walks through the east side of Fergus Falls before returning to rural areas of Otter Tail County. Heading to the north, the NCT spends about six miles in Maplewood State Park, then turns primarily northeast to visit many small lakes in this region of Minnesota. The trail passes through Vergas and then passes over the US 10 expressway shortly before walking through Frazee.

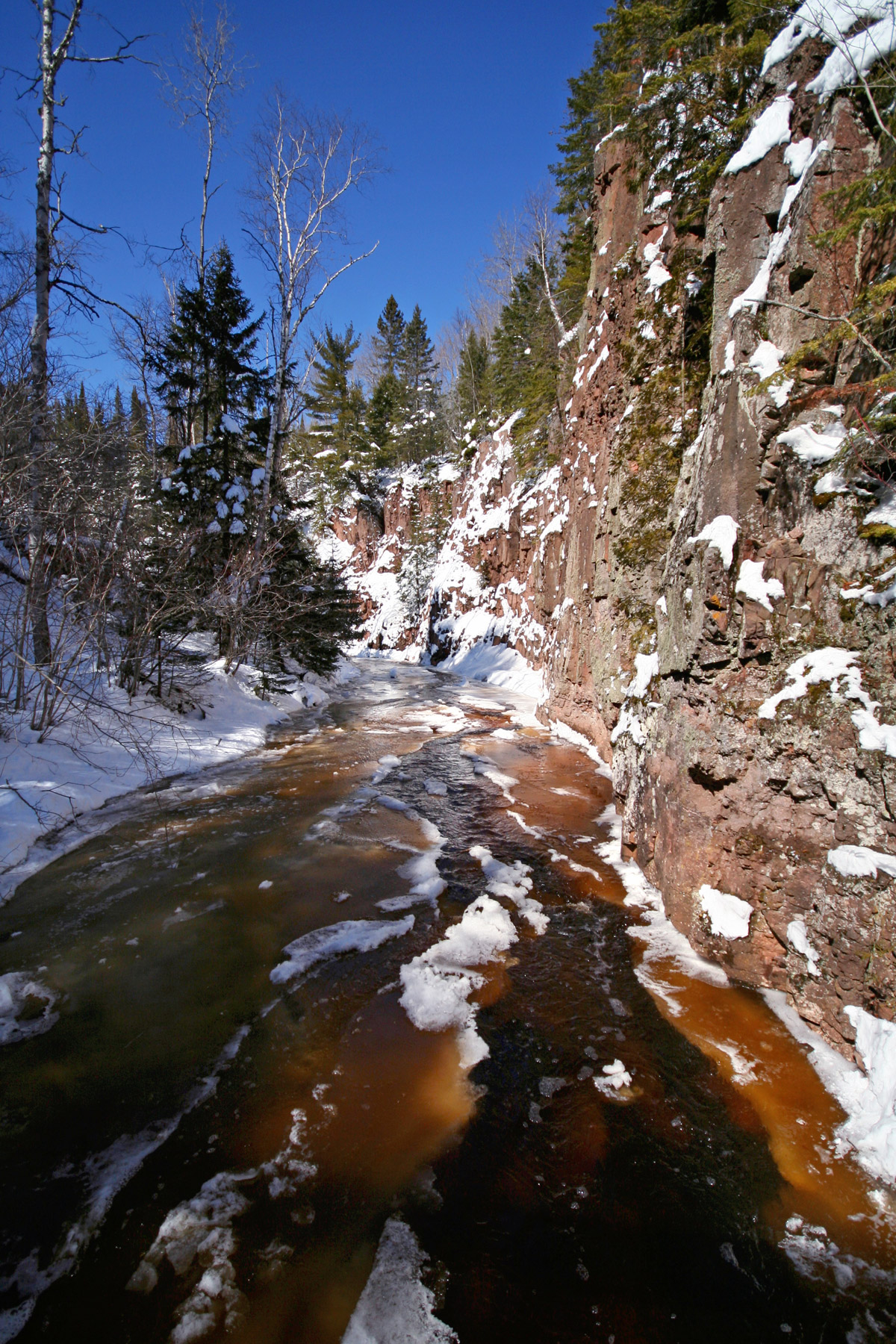
Crow Creek in Lake County, Minnesota, as seen from the combined North Country Trail and Superior Hiking Trail

Continuing to the north through lake country, the NCT spends more than 160 miles (257 km) in a succession of mostly contiguous public lands, starting with Hubbel Pond Wildlife Management Area in Becker County. This is followed by lengthy treks through Tamarac National Wildlife Refuge, Becker County Forest, Greenwater Lake Scientific and Natural Area, White Earth State Forest, Clearwater County Forest, Itasca State Park (including a crossing of US 71), Hubbard County Forest, Paul Bunyan State Forest, Cass County Forest, Chippewa National Forest, and Itasca County Forest. Starting in the eastern reaches of Chippewa National Forest, the NCT walks along Minnesota State Highway 6 (MN 6) for several miles, then turns east on rural roads to the town of Cohasset.

After Cohasset, the NCT walks through considerable residential and commercial areas in Grand Rapids, including crossings of US 169 and US 2. Trending to the northeast and encountering several small lakes, the trail then walks through the towns of Coleraine, Taconite, and Marble in Itasca County, with two brief walks along US 169. The trail passes through a brief corner of Hill-Annex Mine State Park, and loosely follows US 169 through Nashwauk and Keewatin. The NCT uses rural roads around the west and north sides of Hibbing, utilizing several public parks, followed by a brief encounter with Chisholm and a walk through Buhl in St. Louis County. These towns are surrounded by various county forests and wildlife management areas. Still roughly following US 169 to the east, the NCT uses a suburban street to pass under the US 53 expressway and then enters extensive residential and commercial districts in Virginia, with a walk through parklands along that city's lakes. The trail continues to the southeast through Gilbert and then Biwabik. The NCT then passes through Vermilion Trail Park and walks for a short distance alongside Embarrass Lake, and then loosely follows the river of the same name to the northeast. Passing through extensive rural areas to the west and north of Embarrass Mountain, the trail reaches the town of Tower and then spends about eight miles on footpaths in Lake Vermilion-Soudan Underground Mine State Park, followed by several segments of St. Louis County Forest and then a small segment of Superior National Forest.

This is followed by a lengthy walk on MN 1 to the town of Ely, where the trail is alongside Miners Lake. The NCT then walks along MN 169 though Winton, and continues on rural roads for about 12 miles through another segment of Superior National Forest, followed by about 40 miles (64 km) of footpaths. After a brief semi-rural area, the trail continues on extensive wilderness footpaths for about the next 100 miles (160 km) in the main body of Superior National Forest and various tracts of the Boundary Waters Canoe Area Wilderness, just south of the Canadian border, until reaching a junction with the Superior Hiking Trail (SHT) near the north end of Swamp River Lake. This point is also a junction with the Border Route Trail. The NCT then joins the preexisting Superior Hiking Trail for the next 310 miles, heading southwest through more of Superior National Forest and six Minnesota state parks on or near Lake Superior. The NCT/SHT walks for a considerable distance through Duluth and its suburban areas, using a city street to pass under the US 53 expressway and then a local park path to pass under I-35/US 2, followed by two local parks and a lengthy walk through Jay Cooke State Park. The trail then reaches the Wisconsin border, where the SHT ends but the footpath continues as the NCT into Wisconsin.

== Wisconsin ==
Counties crossed: Douglas County (where it leaves the Wisconsin border) → Bayfield County → Ashland County → Iron County

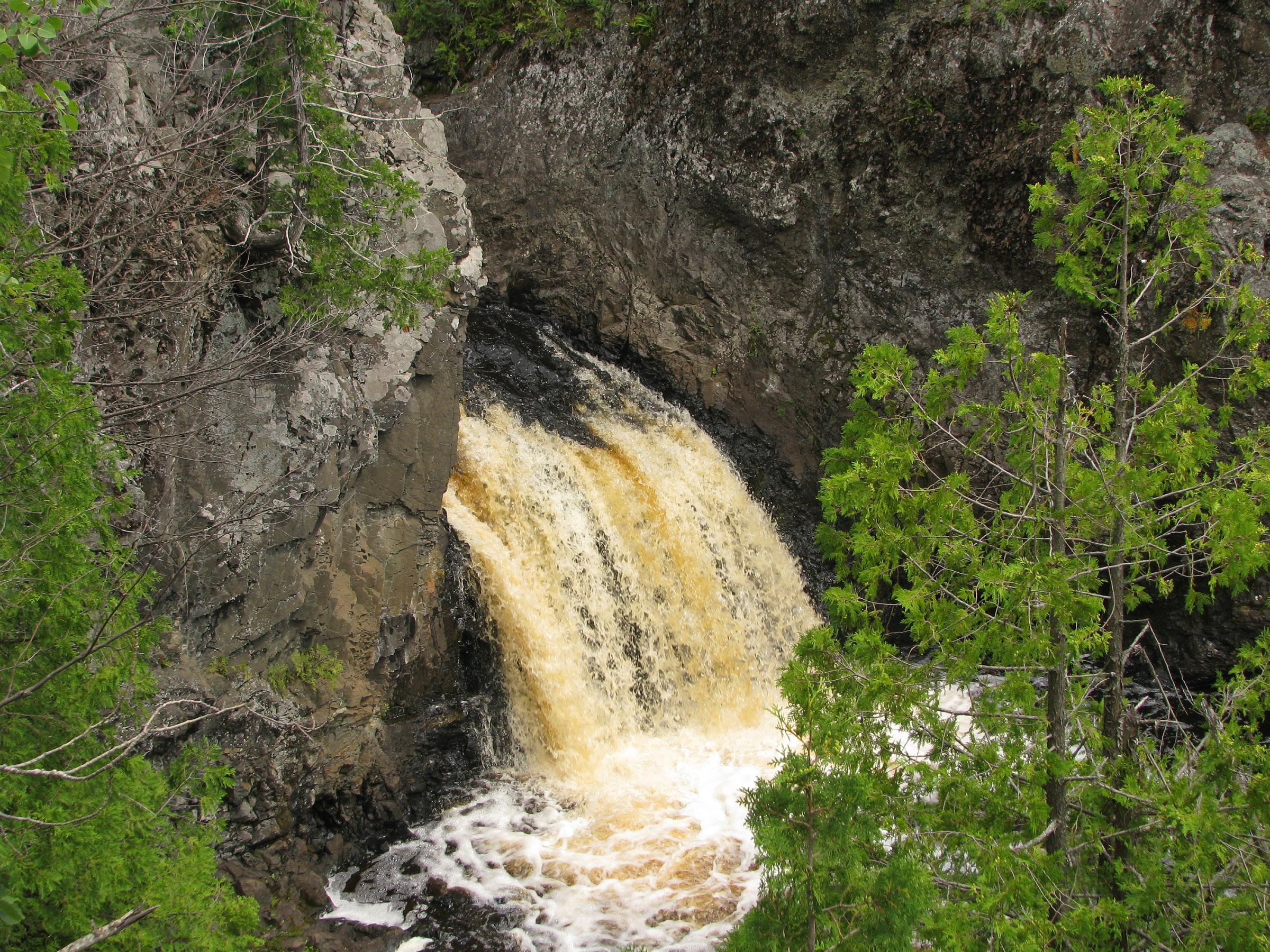
The NCT passes by Wren Falls in Iron County, Wisconsin

The North Country Trail spends about 215 miles (346 km) in Wisconsin. Upon exiting Minnesota's Jay Cooke State Park, the NCT crosses the state line into Wisconsin and turns south, briefly winding back into Minnesota again for about two miles (3.2 km) (the North Country Trail Association manages and maps this segment as part of Wisconsin). The trail then turns to the east and crosses the state line again, entering the protected MacQuarie Wetlands and Douglas County Forest. After some lengthy rural road walking, the trail passes through Pattison State Park and trends to the south, passing through another sector of Douglas County Forest which features significant footpath hiking. The trail turns back to the east and passes through wilderness lands at Saint Croix National Scenic Riverway. Several more miles though Douglas County Forest are followed by a crossing of US 53 and a walk through the town of Solon Springs in Douglas County. This is followed by another extensive stretch of wilderness hiking through Brule River State Forest and then Bayfield County Forest.

The wilderness footpath continues to the east through Chequamegon–Nicolet National Forest for several dozen miles, including trails through Rainbow Lake Wilderness and Porcupine Lake Wilderness. After exiting the national forest, the NCT returns to rural road walking, and passes through Mellen in Ashland County. This is followed by about nine miles (14 km) of footpaths through Cooper Falls State Park. Next is a lengthy hike through Iron County Forest, as the trail trends to the north. The trail exits the county forest for a few miles, crosses US 2, and then enters another segment of the county forest. The NCT briefly encounters the shore of Lake Superior at Saxon Harbor County Park, then joins a rural road to a remote crossing of the Montreal River at the Michigan state line.

== Michigan ==
Counties crossed: Gogebic County → Ontonagon County → Gogebic County → Ontonagon County → Houghton County → Baraga County → Marquette County → Alger County → Luce County → Chippewa County → Mackinac County → Cheboygan County → Emmet County → Charlevoix County → Antrim County → Kalkaska County → Grand Traverse County → Wexford County → Manistee County → Mason County → Lake County → Newaygo County → Kent County → Barry County → Kalamazoo County → Calhoun County → Hillsdale County

The North Country Trail spends about 1,176 miles (1,893 km) in Michigan, and traverses both the Upper and Lower Peninsulas. After crossing the Montreal River out of Wisconsin, the NCT heads east through undeveloped areas in Gogebic County, followed by a long stretch of rural road walking until reaching Ottawa National Forest and a lengthy hike along the Black River. The trail briefly encounters Lake Superior at Black River Harbor Recreation Area, then turns back to the south then east through more national forest lands. After turning back to the north and walking along the Presque Isle River, the trail encounters Lake Superior again near Manabeznho Falls and then continues relatively parallel to the lakeshore, passing through several campgrounds. After crossing into Ontonagon County, the NCT turns inland through remote national forest lands, passing Lake of the Clouds and continuing through mostly contiguous parcels of Ottawa National Forest. There is a crossing of the West Branch of the Ontonagon River that sometimes requires a road bypass. After more than 150 miles (240 km) in Ottawa National Forest, the NCT walks through a forest unit protected by Baraga County and then walks through undeveloped lands along the Sturgeon River for about six miles to a crossing of US 41. Continuing eastbound through undeveloped areas of Baraga County, the NCT walks through the large and remote Craig Lake State Park.

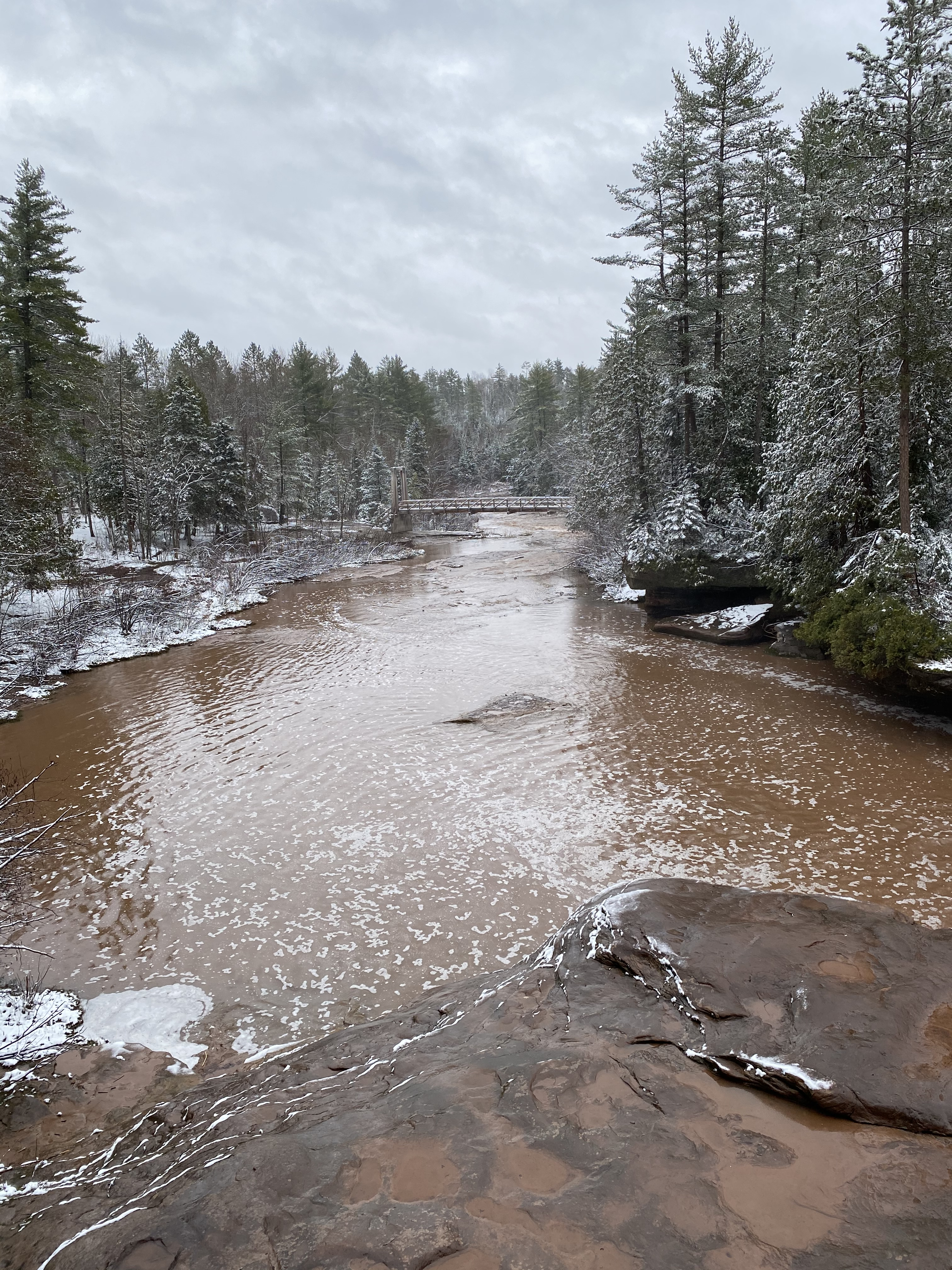
Trail bridge crossing the Baltimore River in the Upper Peninsula of Michigan

After leaving the state park, the NCT continues to the east through undeveloped areas of Marquette County and then enters McCormick Wilderness. Next is a walk through two segments of Gwinn Forest Management Unit, including about four miles (6.4 km) within sight of Lake Superior. The trail then heads southeast and walks through Marquette for a considerable distance, mostly through parklands along the city's lakefront. After leaving the city, the trail heads east through rural areas within sight of the lakeshore and visits some more discontiguous segments of Gwinn Forest Management Unit. The NCT then turns southeast to Laughing Whitefish Falls State Park, and then hikes about 23 miles (37 km) through Hiawatha National Forest. The NCT then walks through Munising and encounters Lake Superior yet again, this time following the lake for more than 30 miles (48 km) through Pictured Rocks National Seashore. The trail then passes through Grand Marais and continues through undeveloped areas in Alger County. The trail walks alongside Lake Superior for about 20 miles (32 km) again in Shingleton and Newberry Forest Management Units.

The NCT then turns south away from Lake Superior and reaches the large and remote Tahquamenon Falls State Park, including two lengthy hikes along the Tahquamenon River. The NCT crosses the mouth of that river at Lake Superior and then heads south into another segment of Hiawatha National Forest and some more waking along the lakeshore. The NCT is in the national forest for more than 80 miles (130 km), including a near-encounter with Lake Michigan and a long walk along Brevoort Lake. The trail walks through St. Ignace for a considerable distance and then Straits State Park. The hiker then climbs onto the Mackinac Bridge (I-75) for the five-mile (8.0 km) crossing of the Straits of Mackinac to Michigan's Lower Peninsula. This crossing for pedestrians and hikers is only permitted during special "bridge walk" events.

After the bridge, the NCT walks through Mackinaw City and continues southwest through rural areas in Gaylord Forest Management Unit and Wilderness State Park, including a brief encounter with Lake Michigan. This is followed by stretches of rural road walking interspersed with various segments of Gaylord Forest Management Unit. The trail reaches Lake Michigan again at Petosky State Park and then walks for several miles through the city of Petoskey, including urban parklands along the Bear River. The NCT then heads southeast through additional remote segments of Gaylord Forest Management Unit, interspersed with occasional rural road walking. This is followed by more protected lands in the Traverse City Forest Management Unit. The trail walks a considerable distance through Kalkaska before returning to protected forest lands for several dozen miles, trending to the southwest. The trail crosses US 131 near Fife Lake in Grand Traverse County. In Wexford County, the trail passes into the Cadillac Forest Management Unit and walks for several miles alongside three stretches of the Manistee River, with another crossing of US 131.

The NCT next begins a trek of about 130 miles (210 km) through the Manistee sector of the Huron-Manistee National Forests, roughly parallel to the Manistee River, passing through occasional unprotected areas between national forest segments. The trail crosses the Muskegon River near a private campground in Newaygo County and then continues south on a series of rural roads In Kent County, the trail traverses Rogue River State Game Area and then heads east to Cedar Springs. In the center of that city, the NCT joins the White Pine Trail (a rail trail) and follows it south for about eight miles (13 km) to downtown Rockford. Here the NCT leaves the rail trail and heads east then south on a series of rural roads. The next points of interest are Canonsburg State Game Area and Seidman County Park. The trail then reaches Fallasburg County Park (where it crosses the Flat River) and Lowell State Game Area. The trail then turns south through residential and commercial areas in Lowell and continues on rural roads, passing over I-96 near Pratt Lake. In Barry County, the trail passes through Midddleville State Game Area and then walks through the town of Middleville. At that town's lakefront, the NCT joins the Paul Henry Trail (a rail trail) for about three miles (4.8 km) parallel to the Thornapple River, then continues on rural roads.

The NCT briefly walks along MI 37, then passes through extensive sections of Barry State Game Area and Yankee Springs State Recreation Area, followed by more rural road walking interspersed with undeveloped forest areas in southwestern Michigan. The trail walks briefly through Augusta and a small corner of Fort Custer State Recreation Area, and then heads east through the city of Battle Creek. The NCT mostly follows parklands along the Kalamazoo River for more than five miles (8.0 km) in Battle Creek, and then proceeds through suburban parks to the east of the city. At Historic Bridge Park, the trail uses a rural road to pass over I-94 then heads east on more rural roads, roughly parallel to the Kalamazoo River. The NCT then walks through downtown Marshall, followed by Albion, after which it heads south to Homer and Litchfield. In Hillsdale County, the trail continues through Jonesville and Hillsdale. In all of these towns, the trail often follows riverfronts or lakefronts. Now trending east again, the NCT next passes through Lost Nation State Game Area, then turns south to the Ohio border near the town of Waldron. The trail briefly follows the state line east on a farm road then turns south on another road into Ohio.

== Ohio ==
Counties crossed: Williams County → Fulton County → Lucas County → Henry County → Defiance County → Paulding County → Putnam County → Van Wert County → Allen County → Van Wert County → Allen County → Auglaize County → Shelby County → Miami County → Montgomery County → Greene County → Warren County → Clermont County → Hamilton County → Clermont County → Brown County → Adams County → Scioto County → Adams County → Highland County → Pike County → Highland County → Pike County → Ross County → Pike County → Ross County → Pike County → Ross County → Hocking County → Vinton County → Hocking County → Perry County → Hocking County → Athens County → Perry County → Athens County → Perry County → Athens County → Morgan County → Noble County → Washington County → Monroe County → Noble County → Guernsey County → Harrison County → Guernsey County → Harrison County → Guernsey County → Belmont County → Harrison County → Carroll County → Tuscarawas County → Carroll County → Stark County → Carroll County → Columbiana County → Carroll County → Columbiana County → Carroll County → Columbiana County

The North Country Trail spends about 1,076 miles (1,732 km) in Ohio, and about 90% of that distance is via the preexisting Buckeye Trail (BT), which forms a large loop throughout the state. The NCT shares a path with the Buckeye Trail through western, southern, and east-central Ohio, incorporating about two-thirds of that trail's total distance.

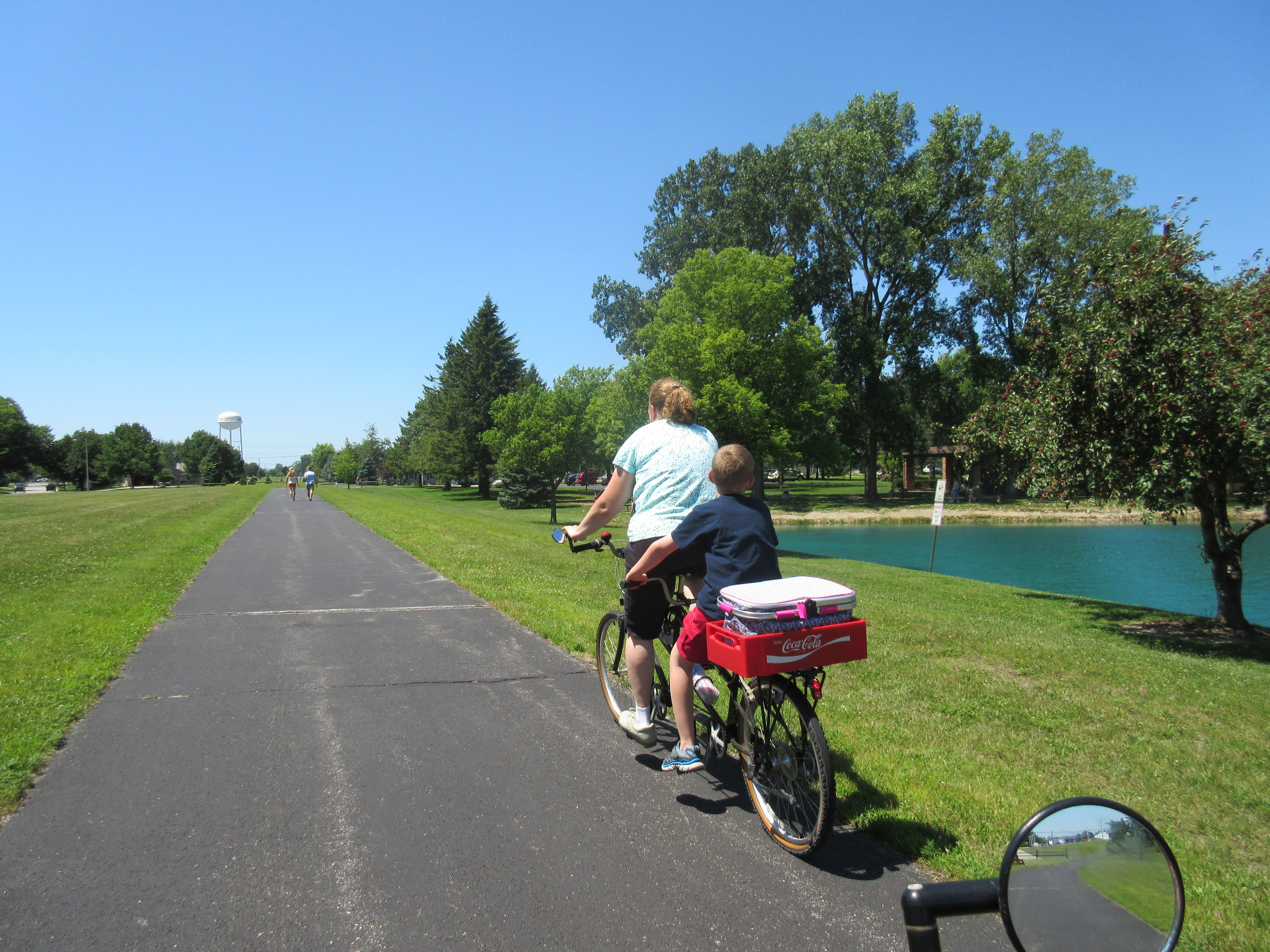
Rotary Park in Wauseon, Ohio, on the Wabash Cannonball Trail, a rail trail portion of the NCT

After entering Ohio from Michigan, the NCT continues south on rural roads, soon passing through the small village of Albion in Williams County, where it crosses US 20. The trail then passes over the Ohio Turnpike (I-80/I-90), walks through West Unity where crosses US 127 and Alternate US 20, and turns to the east. Here the NCT temporarily joins the Wabash Cannonball Trail (a rail trail). The NCT proceeds through Wauseon in Fulton County and continues on rural roads and then another segment of the Wabash Cannonball Trail. Just south of Swanton, the trail joins footpaths in Oak Openings Preserve Metropark and a small segment of Maumee State Forest, and then rejoins the Wabash Cannonball Trail again for a walk through Whitehouse. The trail then walks along State Route 64 (SR 64) for about two miles, over the US 24 expressway and into Waterville.

Along the Maumee River on the south side of Waterville, the NCT joins the route of the Buckeye Trail, and the two trails share the same path for more than 900 miles (1,400 km) ahead. The combined trail turns southwest and follows an old canal towpath and rural roads along the river for a considerable distance, passing through several local parks and preserves. In Henry County, the trail passes under the US 6 expressway and then walks through residential and commercial neighborhoods in Napoleon. Still following undeveloped lands along the Maumee River, the trail passes through the village of Florida and then walks through downtown Defiance. The trail then turns south and follows a long series of rural roads through the valley of the Auglaize River. At Ottoville in Putnam County, the trail briefly walks along US 224 and continues on rural roads through Fort Jennings. The trail then passes under the US 30 expressway and walks through Delphos. The trail continues south via the Miami-Erie Canal Walkway to Spencerville in Allen County.

The NCT/BT continues south on rural roads and undeveloped areas along SR 66 and then along the Saint Marys River for a considerable distance. The trail passes under the US 33 expressway and then walks through a few residential neighborhoods and several parks in St. Marys. The trail continues south alongside a long stretch of the former Miami and Erie Canal, with some surviving segments still carrying water. The trail walks through New Bremen and Minster in Auglaize County, still following the old canal towpath. The trail then walks through a segment of Lake Loramie State Park and briefly follows the lake of that name, then walks through the town of Fort Loramie. After a few miles on rural roads, the trail heads through undeveloped lands alongside Loramie Creek, and passes through the villages of Newport, Dawson, and Newbern in Shelby County.

The NCT/BT, still heading south, walks through several residential and commercial neighborhoods in Piqua in Miami County, and then follows parklands alongside the Great Miami River, passing under I-75. The trail then traverses local parklands for a considerable distance in Troy, Tipp City, and Vandalia (where it passes under I-70), still in the valley of the Great Miami River. The hiker then proceeds through extensive urban areas in the biggest city to be found on the North Country Trail, Dayton, using city streets, local parks, and undeveloped lands at Wright-Patterson Air Force Base and Wright State University. The trail then passes through residential and commercial areas in Yellow Springs (with a crossing of US 68) and Xenia (with a pass under the US 35 expressway), after which it joins the paved Little Miami Scenic Trail for several dozen miles. This trail passes through Spring Valley in Greene County, where it crosses US 42. In Warren County, the trail passes through the village of Corwin and Caesar Creek Gorge State Nature Preserve, enters the northeastern suburbs of the Cincinnati metro area, and then continues to an imposing underpass at I-71 near Fort Ancient. The trail next passes under I-275 and continues through several more suburbs along the Little Miami River.

At Milford, the NCT/BT exits the Little Miami Scenic Trail and uses US 50 to cross the river. After walking through Milford, the trail proceeds through undeveloped areas to the southeast, passing under I-275 again, walking through Rowe Woods Cincinnati Nature Center, and enjoying an extended walk through East Fork State Park. The trail continues to the southeast on a long series of rural roads, passing through Russellville in Brown County until reaching a long stretch of footpaths through undeveloped forest areas in Adams County, including a walk through Shawnee State Park. The trail continues to the northeast and spends a considerable distance in protected areas of Wayne National Forest. After the national forest, the trail uses a variety of footpaths and rural roads to Stockport in Morgan County, where it walks briefly along SR 266 to cross the Muskingum River, followed by a brief stretch on SR 376. The trail continues on a combination of footpaths and rural roads through more forested areas, and passes under I-77 at Macksburg in Washington County. The trail later turns north through another segment of Wayne National Forest, followed by Wolf Run State Park.

Now trending to the north, the NCT/BT walks alongside Senecaville Lake and passes over I-70 near Old Washington. The trail walks alongside or parallel to SR 73 followed by some rural roads to the southeastern segment of Salt Fork State Park. The trail walks briefly along US 22 near the east end of the park's lake, and then follows footpaths through more remote areas of the park. This is followed by several rural roads to the northeast, with another brief walk along US 22 then OH 800 in northeastern Guernsey County. The trail then walks alongside the northern end of Piedmont Reservoir, temporarily joins US 22 yet again, then continues north on rural roads. The trail walks around the eastern end of Clendening Reservoir and then the western end of Tappan Reservoir in Harrison County. To the north, the trail briefly walks alongside Leesville Lake in Carroll County then roughly follows the floodplain of Conolton Creek via rural roads to the northwest.

Outside of Zoar in northern Tuscarawas County, the North County Trail and Buckeye Trail finally separate after more than 900 miles together since the northwestern part of the state. The NCT heads northeast, using a rural road to cross the Tuscarawas River and then walking through Zoar. The trail follows several rural roads to the east and walks through Waynesburg in Stark County, followed by Malvern in Carroll County. The trail then reaches Hanoverton in Columbiana County and continues on rural roads. It walks along US 30 for about one mile, then follows more rural roads along Little Beaver Creek. At Lisbon, the trail walks along US 30 again through the town's center, followed by a stretch along SR 154 and a walk under the SR 11 expressway. The NCT then follows more rural roads, with a walk through a small disconnected segment of Beaver Creek State Park, followed by the larger main segment of the same park with footpaths alongside the creek of the same name. The trail then turns north onto more rural roads, then turns back to the east and northeast, with a footpath through Sheepskin Hollow Nature Preserve. The NCT then reaches the Pennsylvania state line via a rural road to the north of Ohioville.

== Pennsylvania ==
Counties crossed: Beaver County → Lawrence County → Butler County → Armstrong County → Clarion County → Venango County → Clarion County → Forest County → Clarion County → Forest County → Clarion County → Forest County → Warren County → McKean County → Warren County → McKean County → Warren County → McKean County → Warren County → McKean County

The North Country Trail spends about 284 miles (457 km) in Pennsylvania. After crossing the state line via a rural road out of Ohio, the NCT immediately turns onto footpaths through State Game Lands 285 in Beaver County. The trail proceeds through undeveloped forest lands and walks through the small town of Darlington, then continues on a combination of footpaths and rural roads to the north. In Lawrence County it briefly joins Pennsylvania Route 168 (PA 168) to pass over the Pennsylvania Turnpike (I-76) and then uses rural roads to pass under I-376. The trail proceeds through State Game Lands 148, then walks through Wampum, where it briefly follows PA 288 to cross the Beaver River. The NCT continues to the northeast on a variety of rural roads to McConnells Mill State Park, where it joins the preexisting Slippery Rock Gorge Trail and connected park trails. After that park, the NCT joins rural roads again, with a crossing of US 19 and an overpass at I-79. The NCT then enters Moraine State Park, passes under US 422, and then joins the preexisting Glacier Ridge Trail for about the next 15 miles (24 km), including a crossing of PA 528. After walking through the grounds of Jennings Environmental Education Center, the NCT continues to the northeast on rural roads, followed by long stretches of footpath hiking through two segments of State Game Lands 95, where Slippery Rock Creek is encountered again.

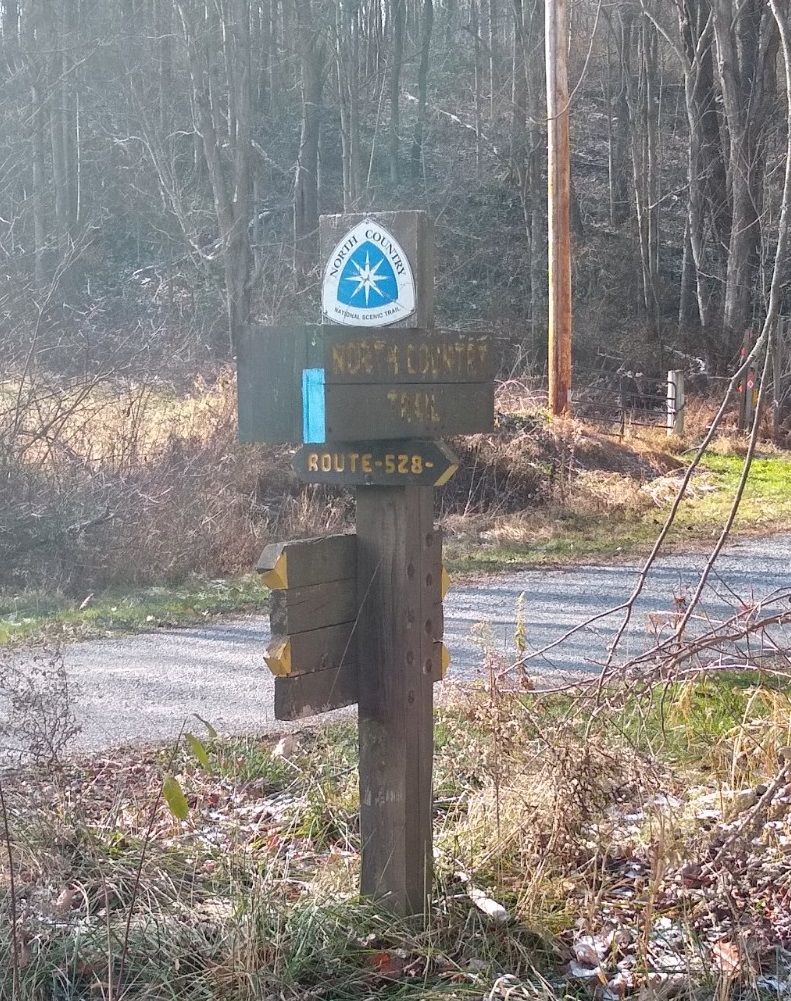
An NCT signpost in Moraine State Park, Pennsylvania

The NCT next walks through Parker and briefly joins PA 368 to cross the Allegheny River. The NCT then joins the Allegheny River Trail (a rail trail) to follow that river to the north for about the next 28 miles (45 km), traversing Foxburg and Emlenton, an underpass at I-80, and three former railroad tunnels along the way. In Venango County, the NCT switches to an intersecting rail trail, the Sandy Creek Trail, and heads to the southeast to a crossing of US 322. After that highway, the same old railroad grade continues ahead as the Clarion Highlands Trail, which takes the NCT through a portion of State Game Lands 45 and into Clarion County. Where that rail trail ends, the NCT continues on rural roads to the southeast, with a brief walk along US 322, followed by State Game Lands 63. and another brief walk along US 322 near Shippenville. This is followed by a lengthy footpath through another segment of State Game Lands 63, some more footpaths through undeveloped lands, another crossing of US 322, and then a trip through State Game Lands 72. The trail continues through undeveloped lands, roughly parallel to Toby Creek, until reaching Clear Creek State Forest where extended footpaths loosely follow the Clarion River. At the small village of Gravel Lick, the NCT reaches a junction with the preexisting Baker Trail, and the two trails follow the same path for about the next 15 miles (24 km).

The NCT continues north through Cook Forest State Park, followed by another segment of Clear Creek State Forest and State Game Lands 24. In Forest County, the trail crosses a border into Allegheny National Forest, through which it will hike for about the next 99 miles (159 km). Most of this distance is on footpaths, with occasional minor road walks. In Warren County, the NCT briefly follows the same path as the popular Minister Creek Trail, and in McKean County it crosses US 6 near the town of Ludlow. The trail crosses the southeastern arm of the Allegheny Reservoir via a brief walk on PA 321 at Red Bridge Recreation Area. Near the New York Border, the NCT enters the northern segment of Allegheny National Recreation Area and uses a portion of the Tracy Ridge Hiking Trail System to walk alongside the reservoir for an extended distance. Near Willow Bay Recreation Area, the NCT reaches the New York border and continues as a footpath into Allegany State Park.

== New York ==
Counties crossed: Cattaraugus County → Allegany County → Wyoming County → Livingston County → Allegany County → Steuben County → Schuyler County → Tompkins County → Tioga County → Tompkins County → Tioga County → Tompkins County → Cortland County → Tompkins County → Cortland County → Onondaga County → Madison County → Oneida County → Herkimer County → Hamilton County → Warren County → Essex County

The North Country Trail spends about 690 miles (1,110 km) in New York State. After leaving Allegheny National Forest at the Pennsylvania state line, the NCT continues on footpaths through Allegany State Park. At the state line, the NCT also joins the preexisting Finger Lakes Trail (FLT), and the two trails follow the same path for about the next 430 miles (690 km) until the central part of the state. North of the state park, the trail joins New York State Route 417 (NY 417) through an interchange with I-86 and a walk through Shongo, then joins NY 353 for a bridge over the Allegheny River. The trail then joins a combination of rural roads and footpaths through undeveloped areas of Cattaraugus and Allegany Counties, trending to the northeast then southeast. Just after entering Steuben County, the trail uses a drainage tunnel under I-86 then walks along Almond Lake. Continuing to the east on a mix of footpaths and rural roads, the trail crosses I-86 again via a short stretch of NY 415 near the town of Bath.

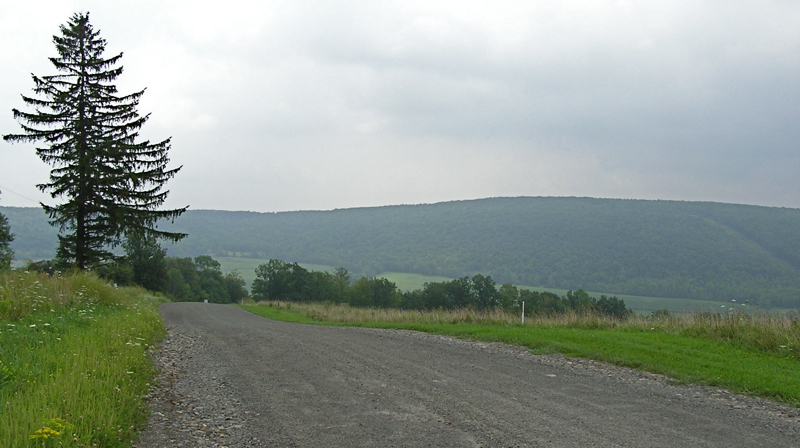
The combined North Country Trail and Finger Lakes Trail near Howard, New York

The NCT/FLT continues in like fashion into the region south of the Finger Lakes. In Schuyler County, the trail walks through downtown Watkins Glen and walks around the southern end of Seneca Lake. The trail later walks through Connecticut Hill Wildlife Management Area and continues through forested lands in the region south of Ithaca, with footpaths through six different small state forest districts. In Cortland County, the trail follows the Tioughnioga River for several miles, and near Messengerville it uses a rural road to pass under I-81. The trail then trends to the north and passes through seven more small state forest districts and Tioughnioga Wildlife Management Area in Madison County.

At the northern edge of the wildlife area, the NCT and the Finger Lakes Trail finally separate, with the NCT continuing north via rural roads though Nelson Swamp Unique Area and the town of Cazenovia, where is crosses US 20. The trail continues on rural roads through Canastota; near Oneida it uses a rural road to pass over I-90. The trail then joins an old canal towpath for about seven miles through Old Erie Canal State Historic Park, After a brief jaunt through farmlands, the trail then heads east on the towpath of the more familiar Erie Canal for about two miles (3.2 km), and then walks through extensive residential and commercial neighborhoods in Rome. In that city, the trail traverses Fort Stanwix National Monument and then parklands along the Mohawk River. After leaving Rome, the trail walks alongside Delta Reservoir and continues via rural roads to the north. In Oneida County it passes through Buck Hill State Forest and Pixley Falls State Park, but remains on roads. The trail next walks through Boonville and then roughly follows the valley of the Black River to the southeast. Shortly after entering Herkimer County, the trail enters Adirondack Park.

The NCT spends about the next 158 miles (254 km) in Adirondack Park, first on preexisting footpaths through extensive wilderness areas in the park's western regions. Near Schroon Lake it joins a rural road to pass over I-87, followed by a walk through the town of the same name. To the northeast, the trail walks along NY 74 for a few miles then continues on a series of remote forest roads. In this region, the North Country Trail Association plans to build footpaths through nearby wilderness areas. In Essex County the trail walks alongside Penfield Pond for about two miles. Still following rural roads to the northeast, the NCT reaches the shore of Lake Champlain and then walks through Crown Point State Historic Park. The trail joins NY 185 for a half-mile-long bridge over the lake and into Vermont.

== Vermont ==
Counties crossed: Addison County → Windsor County → Addison County → Winsdor County → Addison County → Windsor County → Addison County → Windsor County → Rutland County

The North Country Trail spends about 69 miles (111 km) miles in Vermont. Via the bridge out of New York State over Lake Champlain, NY 185 becomes Vermont Route 17 (VT 17), which the NCT follows for a short distance before turning east onto VT 125 through Chimney Point State Park and two wildlife management areas. The trail uses a series of rural roads to the east, with a brief walk along VT 23 near Weybridge. The trail then walks through downtown Middlebury, with a crossing of US 7, a walk through Chipman Hill Park and undeveloped areas within town limits, and two more crossings of US 7. Next is a brief walk through East Middlebury, after which the trail enters Mooselamoo National Recreation Area and Green Mountain National Forest, following wilderness footpaths to the south and southeast for the rest of its distance. After about 12 miles in the national forest, the NCT joins the preexisting Long Trail and the two trails follow the same path to the south for the next 23 miles. At Blue Ridge Mountain in eastern Rutland County, the North Country Trail ends at the Maine Junction intersection with the Appalachian Trail; at this junction the Long Trail continues through Vermont on the next segment of the Appalachian Trail.
