= North Country Trail =

Long-distance hiking trail in the US

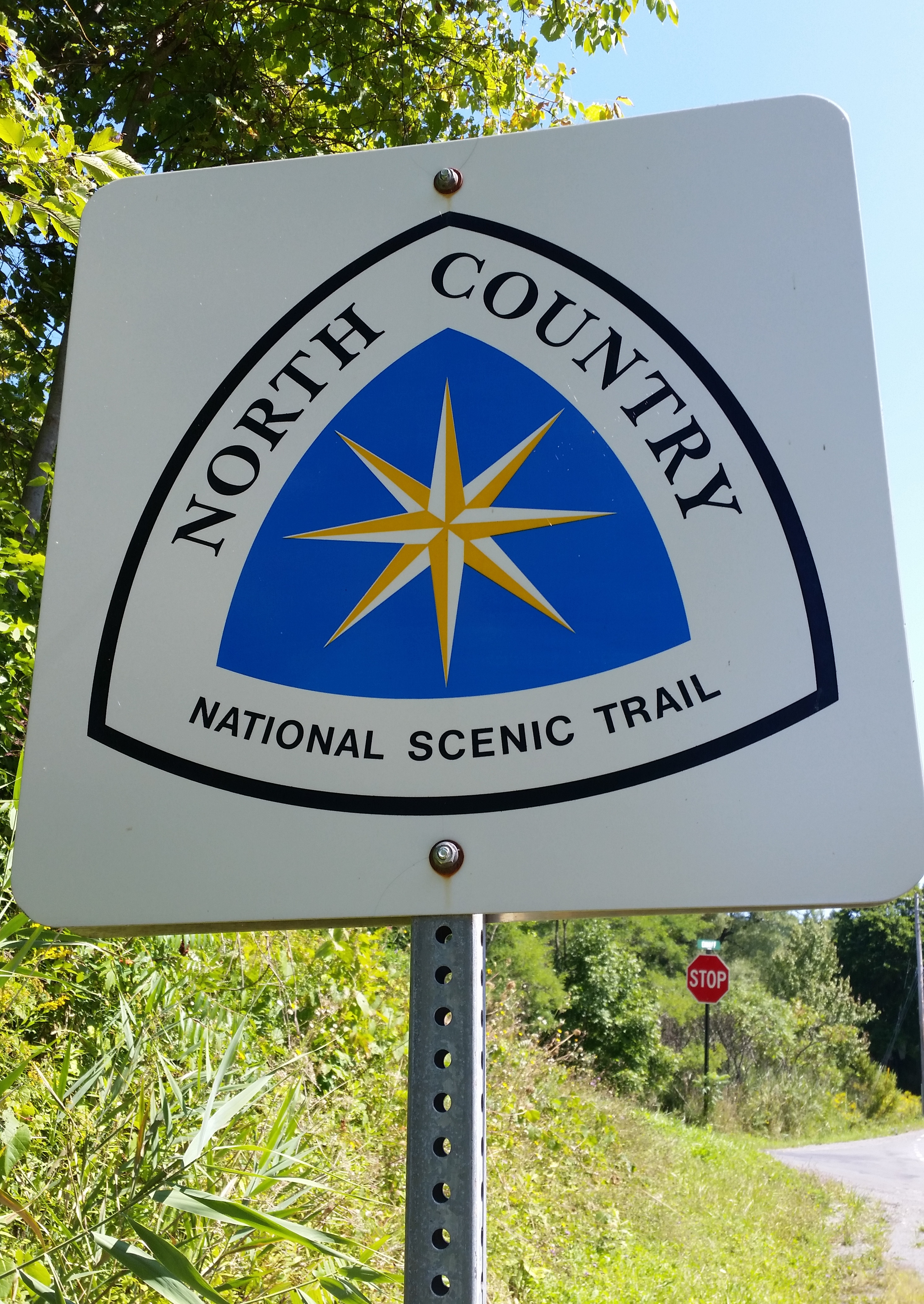
- A North Country Trail sign near Cazenovia, New York
- Length: 4,800 mi (7,700 km)
- Location: North Dakota / Minnesota / Wisconsin / Michigan / Ohio / Pennsylvania / New York / Vermont
- Designation: National Scenic Trail (1980)
- Trailheads: Lake Sakakawea State Park, North Dakota; Green Mountain National Forest, Vermont
- Use: Hiking
- Difficulty: Easy to strenuous
- Sights: Northern hardwood forest; prairie; agricultural fields; low mountains; sand dunes; boreal forest; lake shores; small towns
- Website: North Country Trail

Map overview

The North Country Trail (NCT, officially designated the North Country National Scenic Trail) is a long-distance hiking trail in the Midwestern and Northeastern United States. The trail extends roughly 4,800 miles (7,700 km) from Lake Sakakawea State Park in North Dakota to the Appalachian Trail in Green Mountain National Forest in Vermont, passing through eight states along its route. As of 2023, most of the trail is in place, though about one-third of the distance consists of road walking; those segments are frequently evaluated for transfer to off-road segments on nearby public or private lands.

The trail was designated a National Scenic Trail by the United States Congress in 1980, and became an official unit of the National Park System in 2023. The NCT is administered by the National Park Service, managed by federal, state, and local agencies, and built and maintained primarily by volunteers coordinated by the North Country Trail Association (NCTA) and affiliated local organizations.

The North Country Trail is generally limited to hiking, and some areas can support snowshoeing and cross-country skiing. Some particular segments allow additional non-motorized uses such as bicycling and horseback riding, but only in areas specifically designed and permitted to withstand such use. The distance of the NCT is estimated and often changes, as volunteers develop new footpath segments and other options to reduce road walking.

Interactive map of the North Country Trail

== History ==
The North Country Trail was proposed on March 5, 1980 via an amendment to the National Trails System Act. That year, a route was established that incorporated many preexisting trails along with plans for building new connecting segments or finding walkable routes on rural roads. In cooperation with local and state hiking organizations, the route of the NCT was superimposed on all 310 miles (499 km) of the Superior Hiking Trail in Minnesota, about 900 miles (1,400 km) of the Buckeye Trail in Ohio, and about 430 miles (690 km) of the Finger Lakes Trail in New York State. The NCT route also incorporated portions of many other shorter hiking trails and rail trails. In most such cases, the hiker follows signs denoting both the North Country Trail and the original trail.

Planning and construction of additional off-road segments continues to the present day. The original proposed route of the NCT was from central North Dakota to northeastern New York State; a long-held goal to extend the eastern end of the route to the Appalachian Trail in Vermont commenced in 2017. That extension was approved by Congress in 2019 as part of the omnibus John D. Dingell Jr. Conservation, Management, and Recreation Act, and the extension was completed in 2021. In 2023, the National Park Service recognized the trail as a unit of the National Park System.

== Route ==
The route of the North Country Trail is described here from west to east. Along its total distance, the NCT traverses more than 150 public land units, including parks, forests, scenic attractions, wildlife refuges, game areas, and historic sites. Included at the federal level are ten National Forests. four units of the National Park system, and two National Wildlife Refuges. The trail also visits dozens of state parks, forests, gamelands, and historic areas, and several local/county forests and parks.

=== North Dakota ===
The North Country Trail spends about 453 miles (729 km) in North Dakota. The trail begins at Lake Sakakawea State Park in Mercer County and heads generally to the east, soon reaching Audubon National Wildlife Refuge. It walks alongside most of the 73-mile-long (117 km) McClusky Canal and traverses Lone Tree Wildlife Management Area (North Dakota's largest). The trail traverses Sheyenne Lake National Wildlife Refuge, Fort Ransom State Park, and Sheyenne National Grassland. Near Abercrombie, the NCT uses a state highway to cross the Red River into Minnesota.

=== Minnesota ===
The North Country Trail spends about 869 miles (1,399 km) in Minnesota; this includes 310 miles (499 km) in conjunction with the Superior Hiking Trail. Much of the hike in the western part of the state is on rural roads, with an extended sojourn through Fergus Falls. After that city, the NCT visits many small lakes and passes through Maplewood State Park. Northeast of Frazee, the trail spends more than 160 miles (257 km) in a succession of mostly contiguous public lands that include a variety of state and federal parks, forests, and wildlife refuges.. Highlights include Wannigan Park in Frazee, Hubbell Pond WMA, Tamarac National Wildlife Refuge, Greenwater Lake SNA, White Earth State Forest, Itasca State Park, Paul Bunyan State Forest, and Chippewa National Forest.

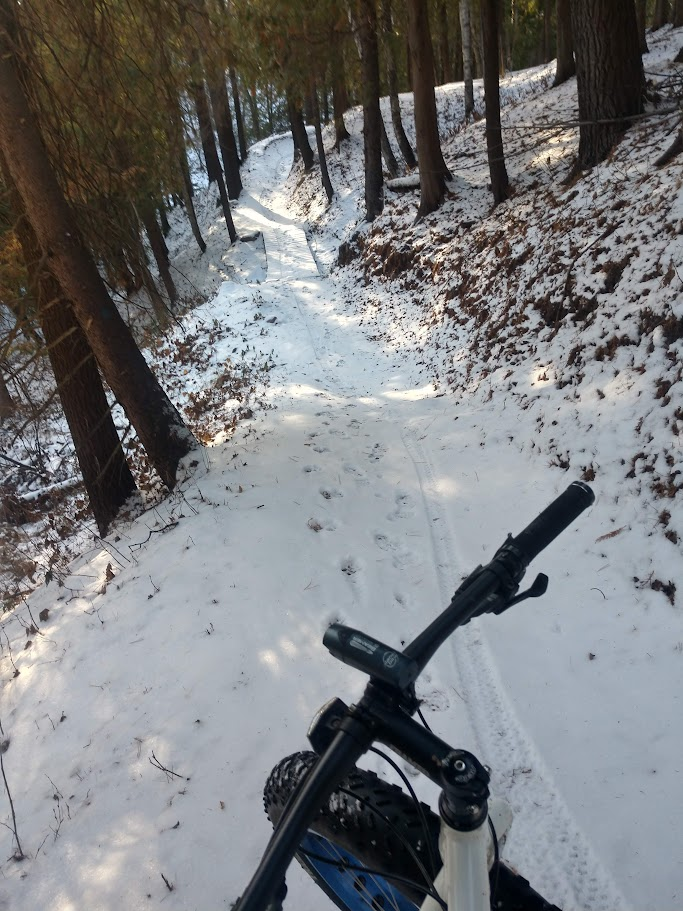
Fat tire bike on the trail in Jay Cooke State Park in Duluth, Minnesota

The NCT enjoys a lengthy walk through Cohasset and Grand Rapids, and also visits Hibbing and Virginia as it temporarily follows the Mesabi Trail in the northeastern part of the state. It also visits Tower and Lake Vermilion-Soudan Underground Mine State Park before reaching Ely. The trail later continues on the Kekekabic and Border Route Trails for about 100 miles (160 km) in Superior National Forest and various tracts of the Boundary Waters Canoe Area Wilderness, just south of the Canadian border, until reaching a junction with the Superior Hiking Trail (SHT). The NCT joins the preexisting SHT for the next 310 miles, heading southwest through more of Superior National Forest and six Minnesota state parks on or near Lake Superior. The NCT/SHT walks for a considerable distance through Duluth and its suburban areas, followed by a walk through Jay Cooke State Park to the Wisconsin border.

=== Wisconsin ===
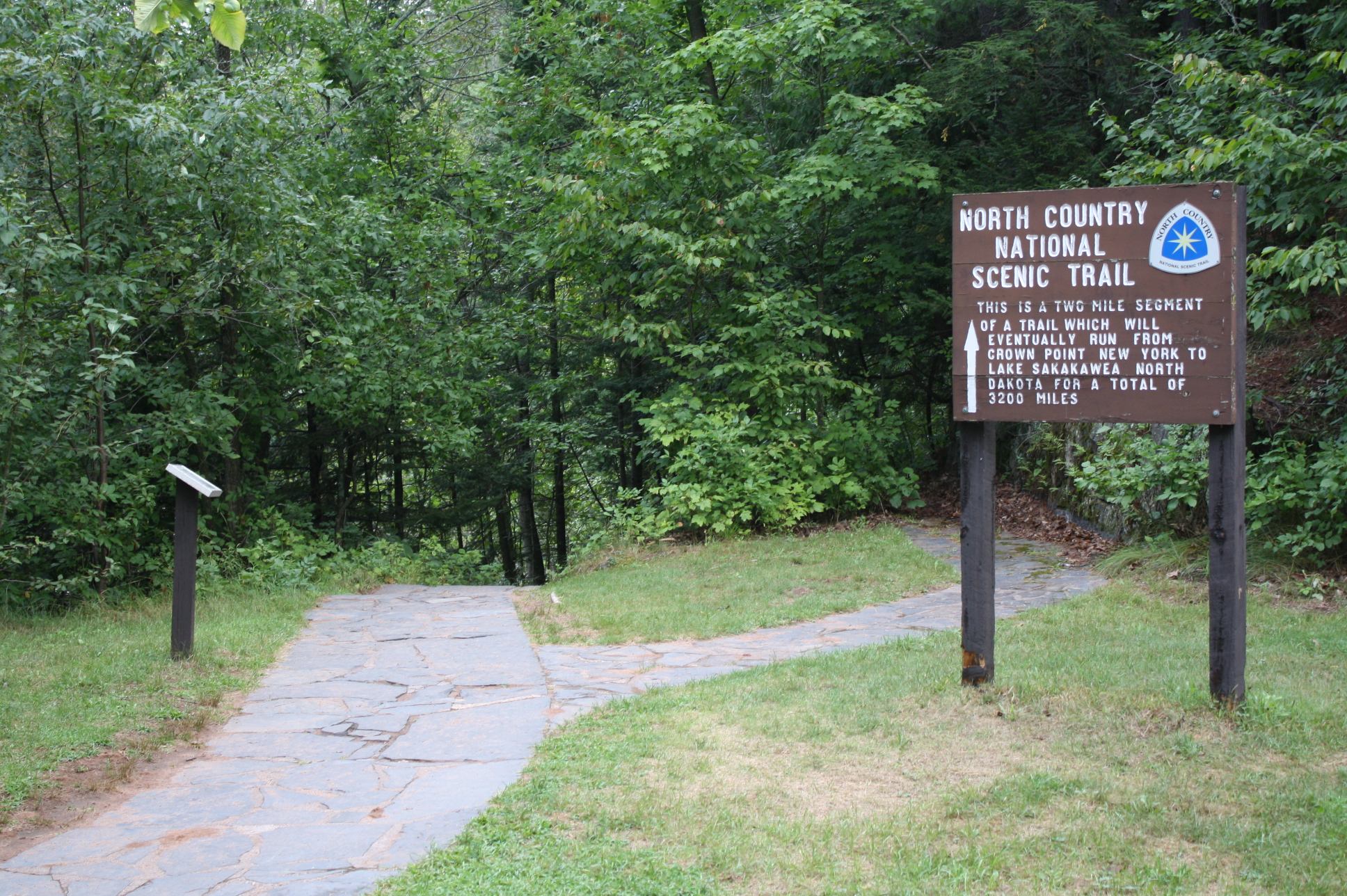
A trail sign in Wisconsin, describing a route and distance that have since been expanded

The North Country Trail spends about 215 miles (346 km) in Wisconsin. Shortly after exiting Minnesota, the NCT briefly winds back across the state line for about two miles (3.2 km) then

remains in Wisconsin. The trail traverses several locally-protected wetland and forest districts, and passes through Pattison State Park followed by Saint Croix National Scenic Riverway. Later there is an extensive hike on wilderness footpaths through Brule River State Forest. The wilderness footpaths continue through Chequamegon–Nicolet National Forest, including sojourns through Rainbow Lake Wilderness and Porcupine Lake Wilderness. Near the Michigan border, the NCT briefly encounters the shore of Lake Superior at Saxon Harbor County Park, then joins a rural road to a remote crossing of the Montreal River at the state line.

=== Michigan ===
The North Country Trail spends about 1,176 miles (1,893 km) in Michigan, and traverses both the Upper and Lower Peninsulas. After crossing the Montreal River out of Wisconsin, the NCT reaches Ottawa National Forest and continues on a lengthy hike along the Black River. The trail briefly encounters Lake Superior at Black River Harbor Recreation Area, then returns to the lake near Manabezho Falls. The trail turns inland through remote national forest lands for more than 150 miles (240 km), passing Lake of the Clouds. After leaving the national forest, the NCT continues through various locally-protected forest areas and walks through the large and remote Craig Lake State Park.

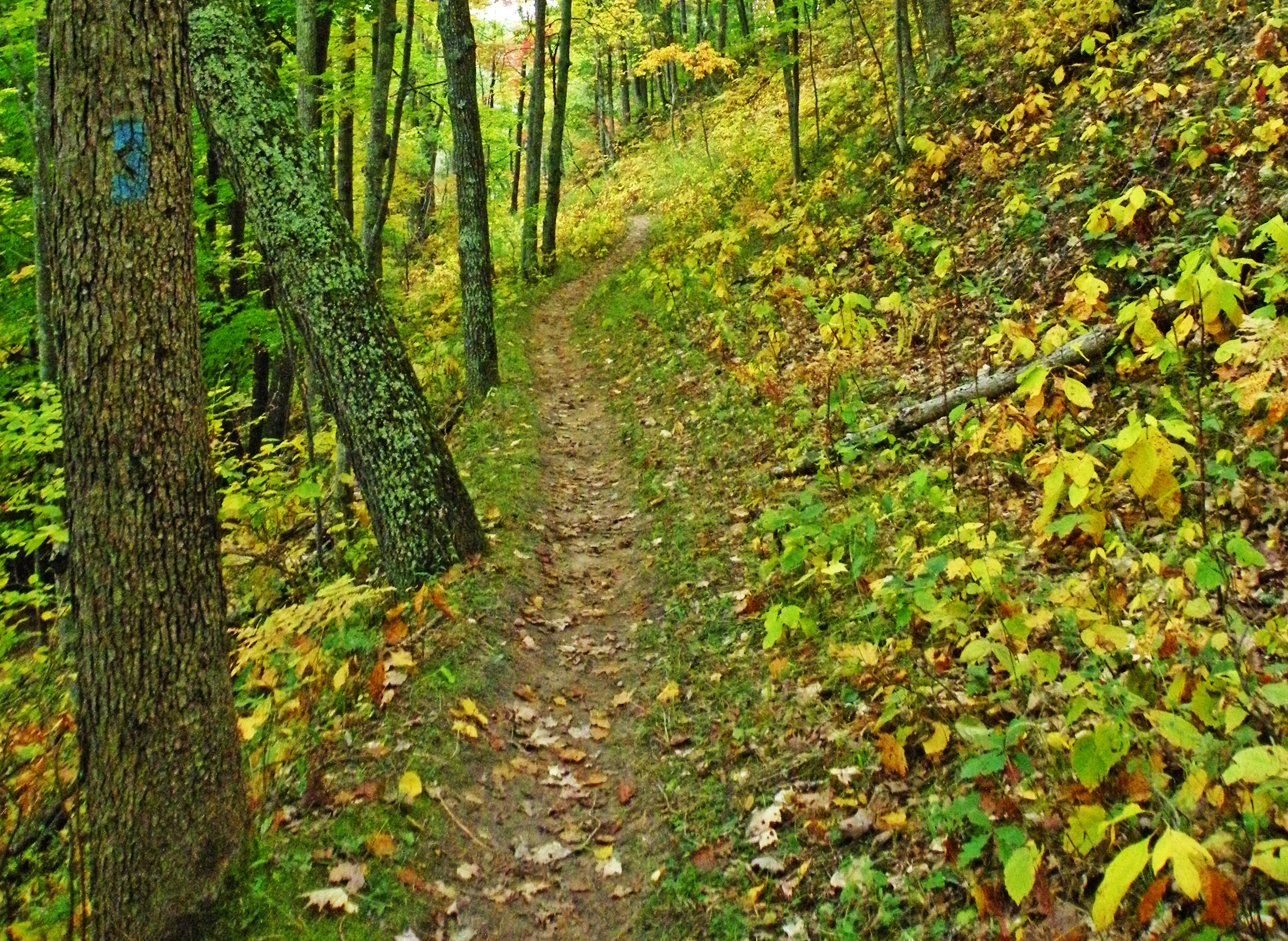
The North Country Trail in the Manistee sector of Huron-Manistee National Forests, Michigan

The NCT walks through Marquette for a considerable distance then reaches Laughing Whitefish Falls State Park. It then hikes about 23 miles (37 km) through Hiawatha National Forest, walks through Munising, and then follows the shore of Lake Superior for more than 30 miles (48 km) through Pictured Rocks National Lakeshore. The trail then passes through Grand Marais and walks alongside Lake Superior for about another 20 miles (32 km) through local forest districts. The NCT reaches the large and remote Tahquamenon Falls State Park, and then heads into another segment of Hiawatha National Forest and some more walking along the lakeshore. The NCT is in the national forest for more than 80 miles (130 km), heading south to a near-encounter with Lake Michigan and a long walk along Brevoort Lake. The trail walks through St. Ignace and then Straits State Park. The hiker then climbs onto the Mackinac Bridge (I-75) for the five-mile (8.0 km) crossing of the Straits of Mackinac to Michigan's Lower Peninsula. This crossing for pedestrians and hikers is only permitted for part of one day (Labor Day) during the annual Mackinac Bridge Walk; at other times, Trail users can purchase ferryboat tickets from point to point via Mackinac Island, Michigan.

After the bridge, the NCT walks through Mackinaw City and continues through Wilderness State Park and various locally-protected forest districts. The trail encounters Lake Michigan at Petoskey State Park and then walks through the city of Petoskey. The trail continues south through more protected forests and walks through Kalkaska. The NCT next begins a sojourn of about 130 miles (210 km) through the Manistee sector of the Huron-Manistee National Forests and reaches the town of Cedar Springs, where it joins the White Pine Trail for about eight miles (13 km) to Rockford. The trail then walks through Lowell and Middleville, where it joins the Paul Henry Trail for about three miles (4.8 km). The NCT continues through Yankee Springs State Recreation Area, followed by Augusta and Fort Custer State Recreation Area, and then heads east through the city of Battle Creek, where it follows parklands along the Kalamazoo River for more than five miles (8.0 km). The trail proceeds through several small towns in Hillsdale County, briefly follows the state line via a farm road just south of Waldron, and then crosses the border into Ohio.

=== Ohio ===
The North Country Trail spends about 1,076 miles (1,732 km) in Ohio, and about 90% of that distance is via the preexisting Buckeye Trail, which forms a large loop throughout the state. After entering Ohio, the NCT passes through Albion and West Unity, then temporarily joins multiple segments of the Wabash Cannonball Trail through Wauseon, Whitehouse, and Waterville. At the latter town, the NCT joins the route of the Buckeye Trail, and the two trails share the same path for more than 900 miles (1,400 km) ahead. In this area, the combined trail loosely follows the Maumee River and passes through Napoleon and Defiance. The trail continues to the south to Delphos, where it joins the Miami-Erie Canal Walkway to Spencerville in Allen County.

Still heading south, the trail walks through St. Marys, follows a long stretch of the former Miami and Erie Canal, and passes through Lake Loramie State Park. The trail walks through Piqua and then follows parklands alongside the Great Miami River, with walks through several small towns. The hiker then proceeds through extensive urban areas in Dayton, the biggest city to be found on the North Country Trail. The trail then walks through Yellow Springs and Xenia, after which it joins the paved Little Miami Scenic Trail for several dozen miles into the northeastern suburbs of the Cincinnati metro area. At Milford, the NCT switches to suburban streets and rural roads though various undeveloped districts, reaching East Fork State Park. Now heading east through southern Ohio, the trail follows a variety of rural roads interspersed with extended hikes through Shawnee State Park, two sectors of Wayne National Forest, and Wolf Run State Park.

Now trending to the north, the NCT walks alongside Senecaville Lake and then enjoys a lengthy hike through Salt Fork State Park. This is followed by rural road walking with visits to several lakes and reservoirs in east-central Ohio. At Zoar in Tuscarawas County, the North County Trail and Buckeye Trail finally separate after more than 900 miles together. The NCT uses rural roads through Waynesburg, Malvern, and Hanoverton. utilizing occasional local parklands and wilderness preserves. The NCT then reaches the Pennsylvania state line via a rural road to the north of Ohioville.

=== Pennsylvania ===
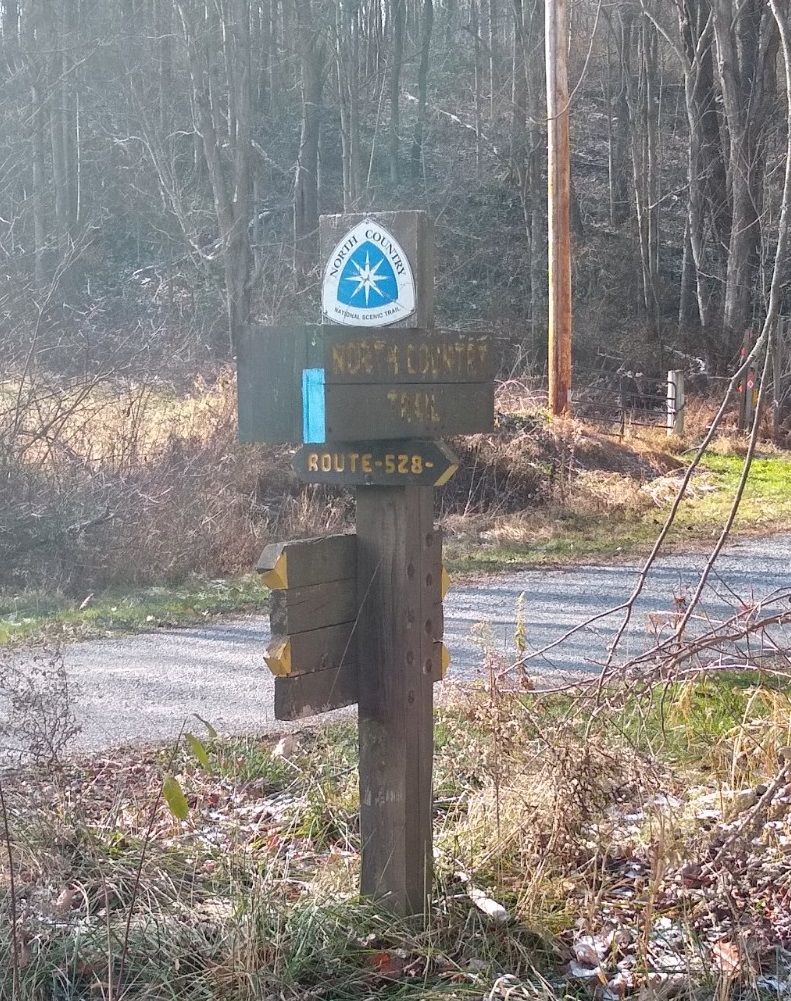
An NCT signpost in Moraine State Park, Pennsylvania

The North Country Trail spends about 284 miles (457 km) in Pennsylvania. After exiting Ohio, the NCT follows footpaths through state game lands and then walks through Darlington and Wampum. Next is McConnells Mill State Park, where the NCT joins the preexisting Slippery Rock Gorge Trail, followed by Moraine State Park, where it joins the preexisting Glacier Ridge Trail for about the next 15 miles (24 km) to Jennings Environmental Education Center. Following rural roads, the NCT next walks through Parker and then joins the Allegheny River Trail to follow that river to the north for about the next 28 miles (45 km), traversing Foxburg, Emlenton, and three former railroad tunnels. The NCT then switches to an intersecting rail trail, the Sandy Creek Trail, followed by the Clarion Highlands Trail. After hiking through some more state game lands, the trail reaches Clear Creek State Forest where extended footpaths loosely follow the Clarion River. The NCT then reaches a junction with the preexisting Baker Trail, and the two trails follow the same path for about the next 15 miles (24 km).

The NCT continues north through Cook Forest State Park, followed by additional state forest and game land districts. The trail crosses into Allegheny National Forest, through which it will hike for about the next about the next 99 miles (159 km). Along the way, it briefly follows the same path as the popular Minister Creek Trail, and crosses the southeastern arm of the Allegheny Reservoir on a road bridge at Red Bridge Recreation Area. Near the New York Border, the NCT enters the northern segment of Allegheny National Recreation Area and uses a portion of the Tracy Ridge Hiking Trail System to walk alongside the reservoir for an extended distance. The NCT then reaches the New York border and continues as a footpath into Allegany State Park.

=== New York ===
The North Country Trail spends about 690 miles (1,110 km) in New York State. Upon leaving Pennsylvania and entering Allegany State Park, the NCT joins the preexisting Finger Lakes Trail, and the two trails follow the same path for about the next 430 miles (690 km). North of the state park, the trail utilizes a combination of rural roads and footpaths through undeveloped areas in southwestern New York, and uses a drainage tunnel under I-86 near Almond Lake. The NCT continues in like fashion into the region south of the Finger Lakes, with a walk through downtown Watkins Glen and around the southern end of Seneca Lake. The trail continues through numerous state forest and wildlife management districts in the region south of Ithaca.

At Tioughnioga Wildlife Management Area in Madison County, the NCT and the Finger Lakes Trail finally separate, with the NCT continuing north via rural roads though Cazenovia and Canastota. Now trending to the east, the trail utilizes towpaths associated with the Erie Canal for several miles and then walks through Rome, with a visit to Fort Stanwix National Monument. After an extended distance on rural roads to Herkimer County, the trail enters Adirondack Park. The NCT spends about the next 158 miles (254 km) in Adirondack Park, largely via wilderness footpaths in the western districts of the park and then remote forest roads in the eastern districts. In this region, the North Country Trail Association plans to build footpaths through nearby wilderness areas. The NCT reaches the shore of Lake Champlain and then walks through Crown Point State Historic Park. The trail joins NY 185 for a half-mile-long bridge over the lake and into Vermont.

=== Vermont ===
The North Country Trail spends about 69 miles (111 km) miles in Vermont. After the bridge over Lake Champlain, the NCT briefly follows VT 17 and VT 125 through Chimney Point State Park and two wildlife management areas. The trail uses a series of rural roads to the east, walking through Middlebury and East Middlebury. The trail then enters Mooselamoo National Recreation Area and Green Mountain National Forest, following wilderness footpaths to the south and southeast. In the national forest, the NCT joins the preexisting Long Trail and the two trails follow the same path for the next 23 miles. At Blue Ridge Mountain in eastern Rutland County, the North Country Trail ends at the Maine Junction intersection with the Appalachian Trail.

== Trail towns ==
The North Country Trail Association coordinates a number of "trail towns" along the route of the NCT, in which local merchants and officials are encouraged to provide services to long-distance hikers. From west to east, these towns include:

- Lisbon, North Dakota
- Abercrombie, North Dakota
- Fergus Falls, Minnesota
- Frazee, Minnesota
- Walker, Minnesota
- Cohasset, Minnesota
- Grand Rapids, Minnesota
- Ely, Minnesota
- Solon Springs, Wisconsin
- Mellen, Wisconsin
- Marquette, Michigan
- Grand Marais, Michigan
- St. Ignace, Michigan
- Mackinaw City, Michigan
- Petoskey, Michigan
- Kalkaska, Michigan
- Fife Lake, Michigan
- White Cloud, Michigan
- Lowell, Michigan
- Middleville, Michigan
- Augusta, Michigan
- Battle Creek, Michigan
- Marshall, Michigan
- Albion, Michigan
- Litchfield, Michigan
- Dayton, Ohio
- Zoar, Ohio
- Lisbon, Ohio
- Darlington, Pennsylvania
- Wampum, Pennsylvania
- Parker, Pennsylvania
- Kane, Pennsylvania
- Canastota, New York
- North Creek, New York

Along the lengthy segment of the NCT that shares a path with the Buckeye Trail in Ohio, the Buckeye Trail Association manages several additional trail towns in which services are available to hikers. Dayton and Zoar are coordinated by both organizations. From west to east, the additional Buckeye Trail towns include:

- Napoleon, Ohio
- Defiance, Ohio
- Delphos, Ohio
- St. Marys, Ohio
- Fort Loramie, Ohio
- Piqua, Ohio
- Troy, Ohio
- Yellow Springs, Ohio
- Xenia, Ohio
- Spring Valley, Ohio
- Loveland, Ohio
- Milford, Ohio
- Shawnee, Ohio
- Deersville, Ohio

== Major intersections ==
Western terminus: Lake Sakakawea State Park, North Dakota
North Dakota

- US 83 / ND 1804 in Coleharbor
- US 52 near Harvey
- US 281 / ND 15 in New Rockford
- I-94 / US 52 in Valley City
- I-29 / US 81 near Abercrombie

Minnesota

- US 75 in Kent
- I-94 / US 59 / US 52 near Elizabeth
- US 10 near Frazee
- US 71 in Itasca State Park
- US 2 / US 169 in Grand Rapids
- US 169 multiple times northeast of Grand Rapids
- US 53 in Virginia
- US 53 in Duluth
- I-35 / US 2 in Duluth

Wisconsin

- US 53 in Solon Springs
- US 2 in Iron County

Michigan

- US 45 near Rockland
- US 41 in Baraga County
- I-75 at the Mackinac Bridge
- in Petoskey
- US 131 multiple times in Antrim County
- US 131 in Kalkaska
- US 131 near Fife Lake
- US 131 in Wexford County
- in Lake County
- US 131 / M-46 near Cedar Springs
- I-96 in Kent County
- I-94 near Battle Creek
- I-69 near Marshall
- in Jonesville

Ohio

- US 20 in Alvordton
- I-80 / I-90 (Ohio Turnpike) near West Unity
- US 20A / US 127 in West Unity
- US 24 near Waterville
- US 6 near Napoleon
- US 224 in Ottoville
- US 30 in Delphos
- US 33 in St. Marys
- US 36 in Piqua
- I-75 near Piqua
- US 40 in Vandalia
- I-70 in Vandalia
- I-75 twice in Dayton
- I-675 in Fairborn
- US 68 in Yellow Springs
- US 68 in Xenia
- US 42 twice in Xenia
- US 35 in Xenia
- US 42 in Spring Valley
- I-71 near Fort Ancient
- US 22 / SR 3 in Fosters
- I-275 near Branch Hill
- US 50 in Milford
- I-275 near South Milford
- US 68 near Mt. Orab
- US 68 multiple times in Brown County
- US 62 in Russellville
- US 23 / SR 104 near Waverly
- US 35 near Richmond Dale
- US 50 / SR 327 in Londondderry
- US 33 / SR 180 near Logan
- I-77 in Macksburg
- I-70 / US 40 in Old Washington
- US 22 in Salt Fork State Park
- US 22 twice near Piedmont Reservoir
- US 250 near Dennison
- US 30 multiple times in Columbiana County

Pennsylvania

- I-76 (Pennsylvania Turnpike) in Lawrence County
- I-376 in Lawrence County
- US 19 in Butler County
- I-79 in Butler County
- US 422 in Moraine State Park
- I-80 in Emlenton
- US 322 in Venango County
- US 322 multiple times in Clarion County
- US 6 near Ludlow

New York

- I-86 / NY 17 / NY 417 in Salamanca
- US 219 near Ellicottville
- I-86 / NY 17 near Almond Lake
- I-86 / NY 17 / NY 415 near Bath
- US 11 near Marathon
- I-81 near Marathon
- US 20 / NY 13 in Cazenovia
- I-90 (New York State Thruway) in Oneida
- I-87 near Schroon Lake
- US 9 near Schroon Lake

Vermont

- US 7 multiple times in Middlebury

Eastern terminus: Appalachian Trail/Long Trail at Maine Junction, Vermont
