= Father Marquette National Memorial =

Memorial in Michigan

- Location within the United States Location within Michigan
- Location: St. Ignace, Michigan, USA
- Nearest city: Sault Ste. Marie, Michigan
- Coordinates: 45°51′6″N 84°43′2″W
- Area: 52 acres (21 ha)
- Established: December 20, 1975
- Governing body: Michigan Department of Natural Resources

Father Marquette National Memorial pays tribute to the life and work of Jacques Marquette, French priest and explorer. The memorial is located in Straits State Park near St. Ignace in the modern-day U.S. state of Michigan, where he founded a Jesuit mission in 1671 and was buried in 1678. The associated Father Marquette Museum building was destroyed in a fire on March 9, 2000.

== History ==
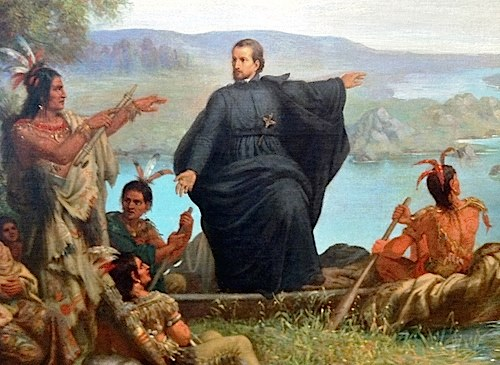
Fr. Jacques Marquette

Marquette arrived in New France in 1666. Marquette established Michigan's earliest European settlements at Sault Ste. Marie and St. Ignace near Mackinac Island in 1668 and 1671. He lived among the Great Lakes Indians from 1666 to his death in 1675. During these nine years, Father Marquette mastered several native languages and joined Louis Jolliet in his expedition to explore and map a navigable route to the Pacific Ocean, which resulted in the French discovery of the Mississippi River.

The Marquette and Joliet expeditions explored the Fox River, the Mississippi River as far as Arkansas, the Illinois River, and the Chicago River. They did not proceed to the mouth of the Mississippi due to hostility of the natives and fear of confronting Spanish colonials.

In October 1674, Marquette and two companions set out on a missionary expedition. By the end of the year, he was afflicted with dysentery. He died near Ludington, Michigan while attempting to return to St. Ignace. The grave of Father Marquette was found to be located in downtown St. Ignace near the Ojibway Indian Museum on State Street.

== The site today ==
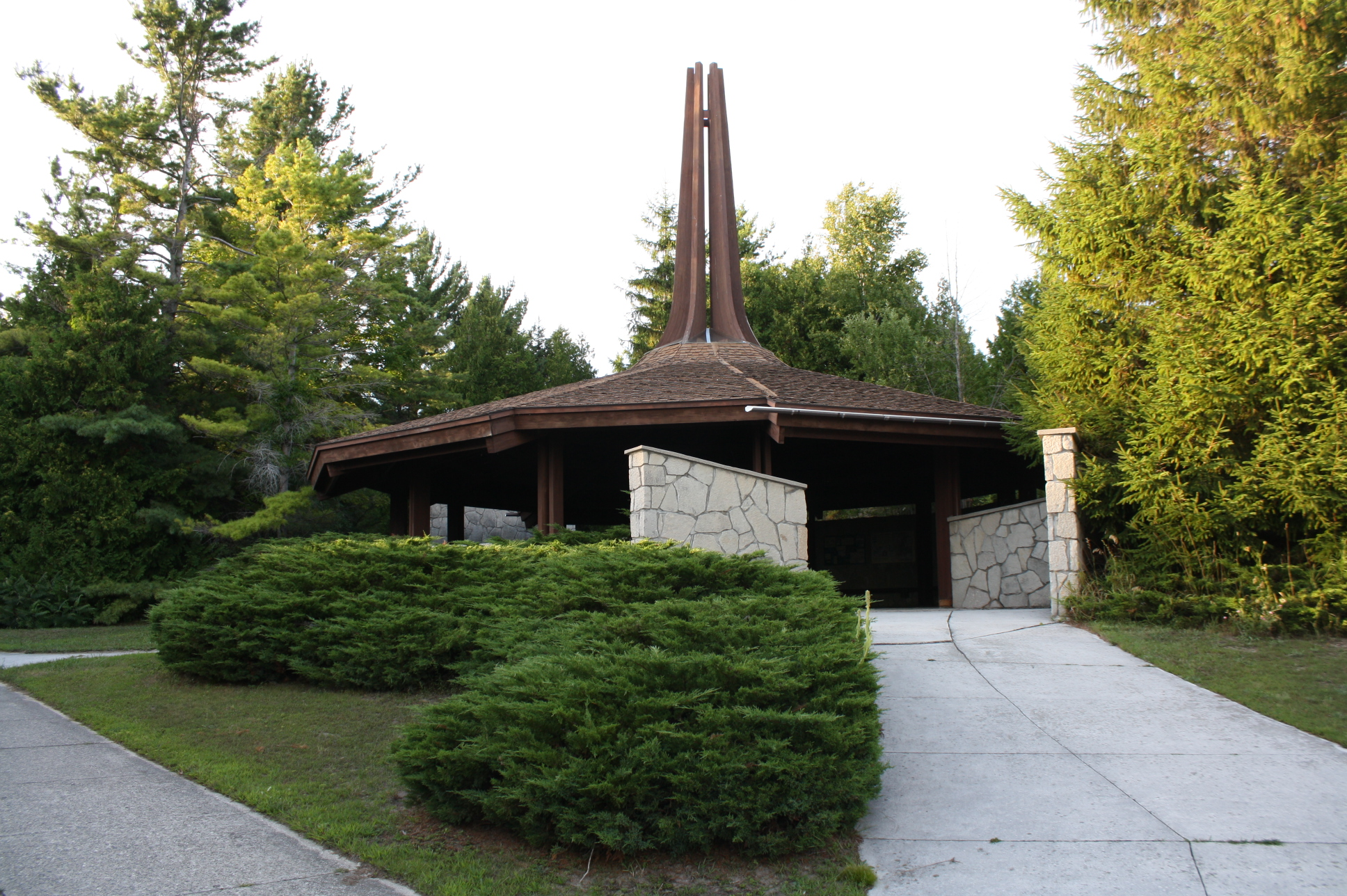
Main building

Subsequent to the destruction of the Marquette Memorial Museum by fire in 2000, the site contains exhibits and a fifteen-station interpretive trail. The main building is an open-concept wood structure with kiosks.

== Administrative history ==
The 52-acre (210,000 m^{2}) memorial is owned and administered by the Michigan Department of Natural Resources and is an affiliated area of the National Park Service. The national memorial was authorized on December 20, 1975. Unlike most national memorials, Father Marquette is not listed on the National Register of Historic Places.

== See also ==
- List of national memorials of the United States
