= Tracy Ridge Hiking Trail System =

Hiking trails in Pennsylvania, United States

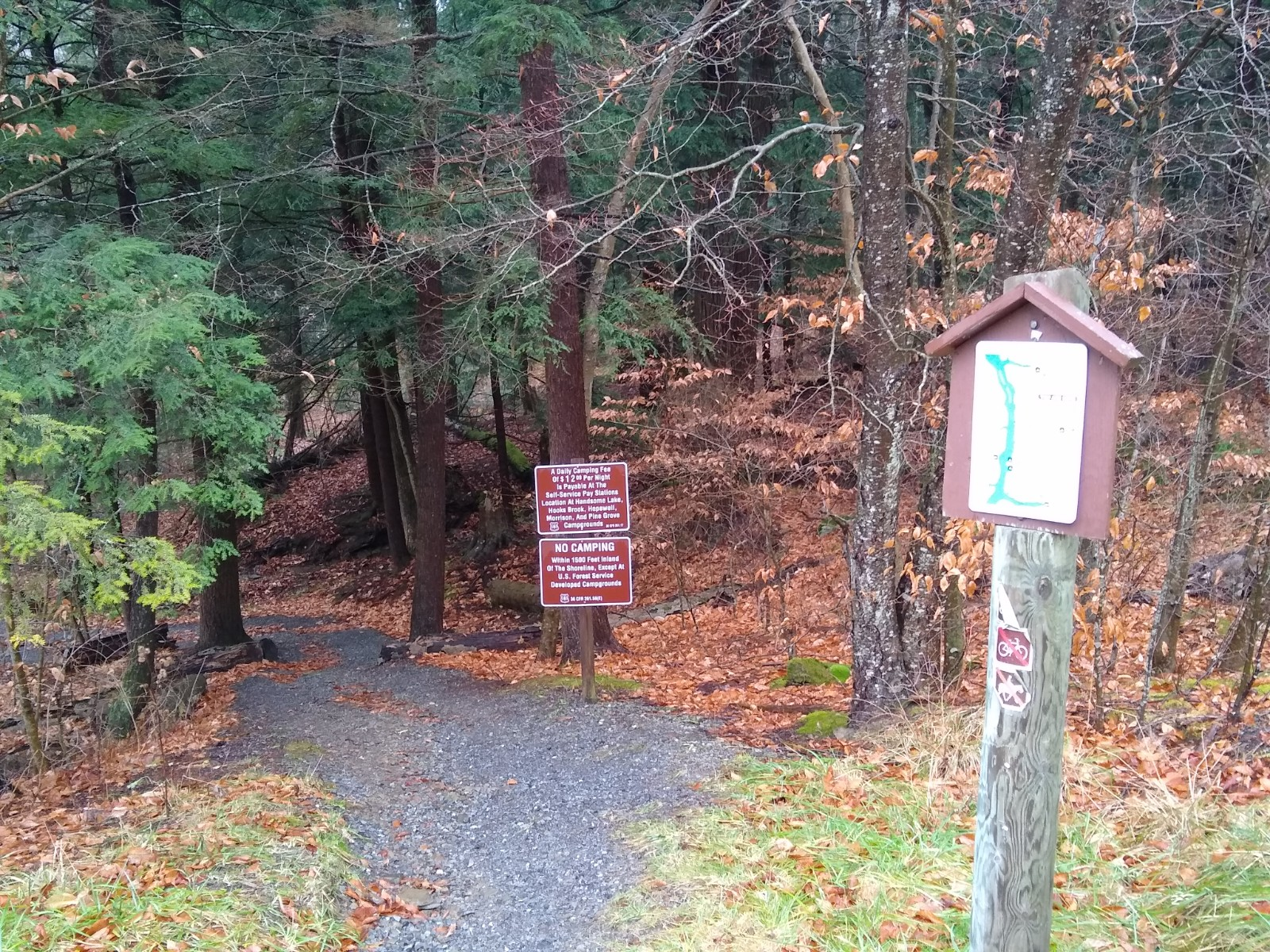
- A trailhead for the Tracy Ridge Hiking Trail System
- Length: 33.7 mi (54.2 km)
- Location: McKean County and Warren County, Pennsylvania, US
- Trailheads: Pennsylvania Route 321, western McKean County
- Use: Hiking
- Elevation change: Moderate
- Difficulty: Moderate
- Season: Year-round
- Hazards: Uneven and rocky terrain, rattlesnakes, mosquitoes, ticks, black bears

The Tracy Ridge Hiking Trail System is a 33.7-mile (54.2 km) system of interconnected hiking trails in Allegheny National Forest in northwestern Pennsylvania. The system was designed to visit the most remote areas of the Tracy Ridge portion of Allegheny National Recreation Area.

== Hiking options ==
The Tracy Ridge Hiking Trail System can be reached from two main trailheads in western McKean County: the northern segments of the network can accessed from Tracy Ridge Campground off of Pennsylvania Route 321, and the southern segments can be accessed from a small parking lot on PA 321 near Nelse Run.

The westernmost trails in the network walk along the shore of the Allegheny Reservoir for significant distances. The system connects with the North Country Trail several times, includes two named trails known as the Tracy Ridge Trail and Johnnycake Trail, and also includes several short unnamed trails from which a variety of hikes can be formed. The unnamed trails are denoted by numbered junctions on maps published by the National Forest. An "outer loop" of 10.3 miles, consisting of the Tracy Ridge Trail, Johnnycake Trail, and the connecting segment of the North Country Trail, is often promoted as an introduction to the Allegheny National Recreation Area's hiking options.
