= Minister Creek Trail =

Hiking trail in Allegheny National Forest in Pennsylvania

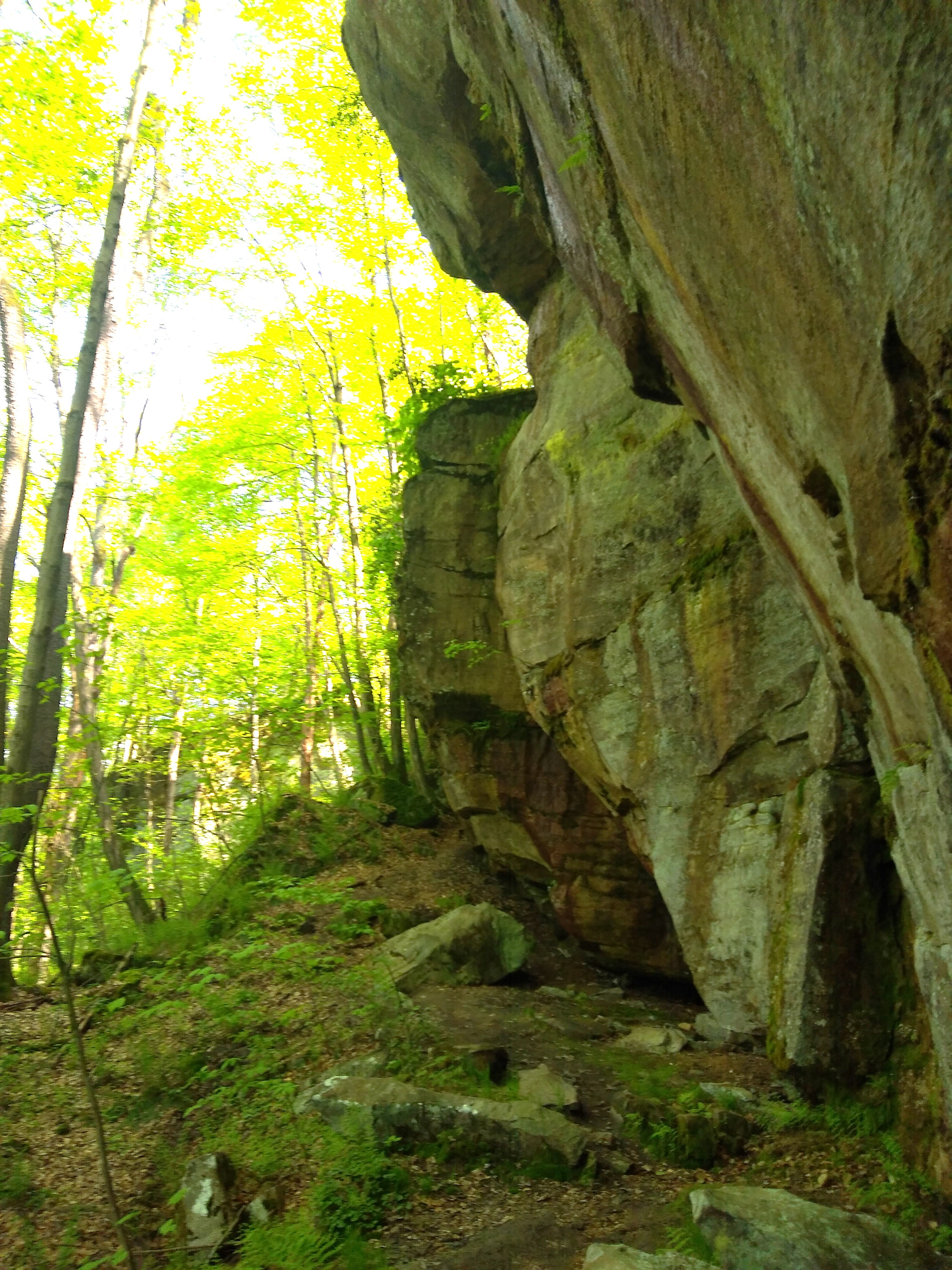
- Cliffs above the Minister Creek Trail
- Length: 6.3 mi (10.1 km)
- Location: Warren County and Forest County, Pennsylvania, US
- Trailheads: Pennsylvania Route 666, northwestern Forest County
- Use: Hiking
- Elevation change: Moderate
- Difficulty: Moderate
- Season: Year-round
- Hazards: Uneven and rocky terrain, rattlesnakes, mosquitoes, ticks, black bears

The Minister Creek Trail is a hiking trail in Allegheny National Forest in northwestern Pennsylvania, consisting of a main loop with entrance trail for a total distance of 6.3 miles (10.1 km). An optional spur trail leads away from the loop to a scenic spot and campground on Minister Creek.

The Minister Creek Trail is widely described as one of the most popular hiking trails in Allegheny National Forest and is renowned for its scenery. Because it shares a segment with the long-distance North Country Trail and passes several campgrounds, the Minister Creek Trail is also acclaimed as an enjoyable overnight backpacking trip, particularly for beginners.

== Route ==
The trailhead is across the road from a parking lot on Pennsylvania Route 666 near the small settlements of Porkey and Minister; the lot also serves Minister Creek Campground and a picnic area. The lot is found by following PA Route 666 for 14.7 miles westbound from Sheffield. The entrance trail (which leads to the main loop) begins to the left of the picnic area and heads to the northwest, rising above PA Route 666 on an old dirt road. At about 0.5 mile reach the first junction with the loop; here most hikers turn right (northeast), after which the trail descends to a footbridge over Minister Creek. The trail follows the valley upstream, gradually rising above the creek and passing many large rock formations. At the top of the initial climb up the side of the valley, the optional spur trail departs downhill to the left and heads to Deerlick Campground.

At 2.5 miles, reach a junction with the North Country Trail and turn left (west); the two trails share the same path for about the next half mile, passing through the popular Triple Forks backcountry campsite at the confluence of three branches of Minister Creek. The Minister Creek Trail then separates from the North Country Trail and heads to the south on the other side of the creek's valley, once again rising above the creek. The trail passes several vistas and many large boulder outcroppings. At 5.7 miles, reach the junction with the entrance trail again; repeat that trail southbound to return to the trailhead on PA Route 666.
