= Straits State Park =

State park in Michigan, United States

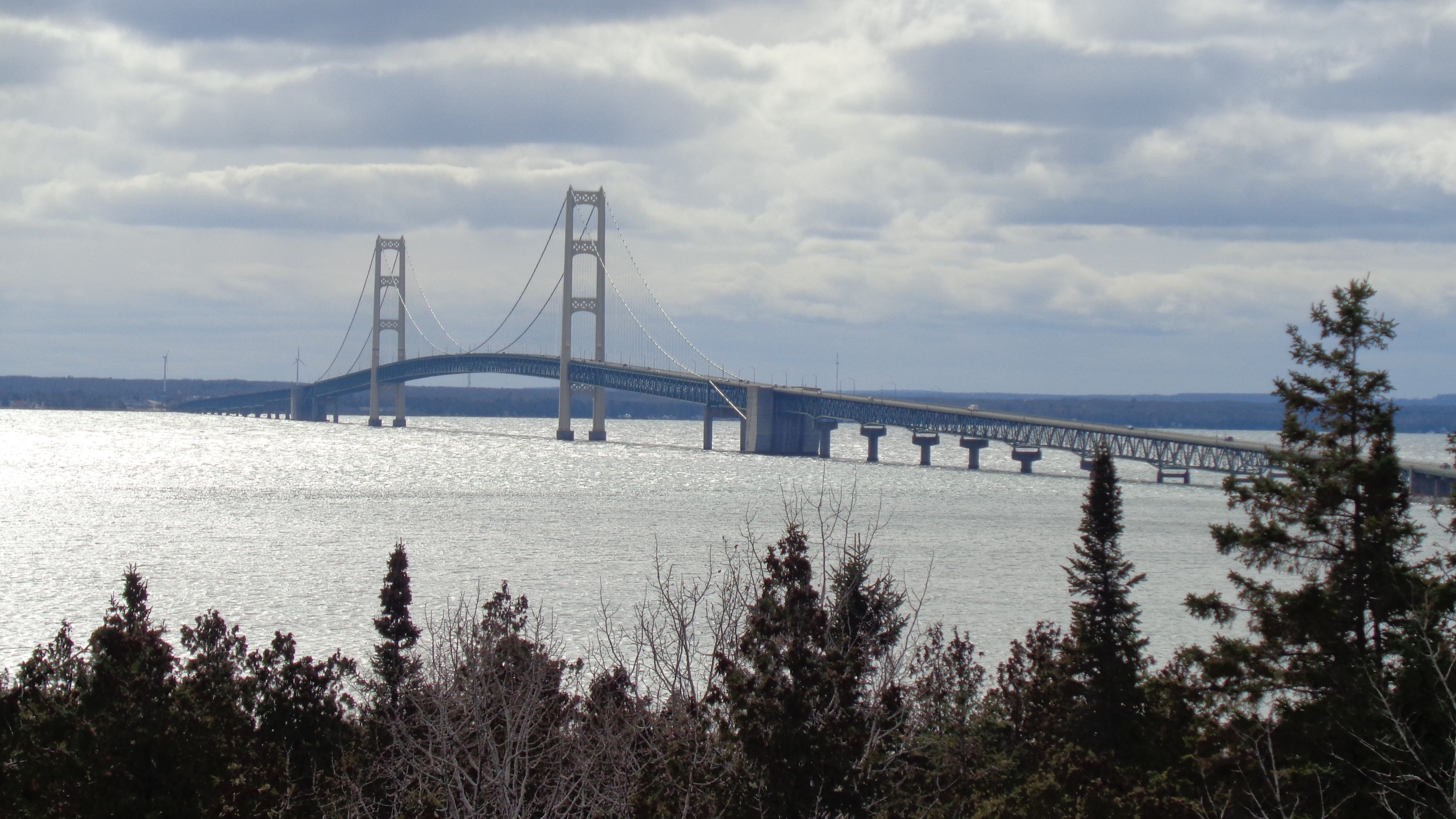
- View of Mackinac Bridge from the state park

- Location within Michigan Location within the United States
- Location: Moran Township and St. Ignace, Mackinac County, Michigan, United States
- Coordinates: 45°51′10″N 84°43′10″W
- Area: 181 acres (0.73 km^{2})
- Established: 1924
- Administrator: Michigan Department of Natural Resources
- Website: Official website

Straits State Park is a state park in the U.S. state of Michigan located in Moran Township and St. Ignace in Mackinac County on the northern shores of the Straits of Mackinac. The Father Marquette National Memorial and park is also located within the state park boundaries. The park has 255 campsites and several locations for viewing the Mackinac Bridge.

== History ==
=== Establishment ===
Straits State Park was established in 1924 as a simple day park with the entrance located at the corner of Paro and Hombach street. In the mid-1940s the park was redesigned to allow for approximately 32 tent campsites along the shores of the Straits of Mackinac. Around this time, the entrance to the park changed to the corner of Paro and Church street.

=== 1950s expansion and Mackinac Bridge impact ===
In the early 1950s the park expanded north and about 90 new campsites were created to accommodate traveling campers and their travel trailers in the southern park along the Straits of Mackinac. The park entrance remained the same as it was easily accessible to travelers arriving in St. Ignace from the Lower Peninsula by way of the car ferry which docked only a half mile east of the park. The new northern land was left undeveloped.

In the mid-1950s construction began on the Mackinac Bridge and its approaches. The road, however, was designed to cut through the center of the northern park expansion. In a compromise, it was agreed that a pedestrian bridge would be erected over the new road connecting the two parts. However, that bridge was never built. Additionally, original concepts called for a Mackinac Bridge Museum to be constructed at the northern end of the bridge thus cutting away more park land. The land for the museum was allowed to be annexed but no museum was ever built. Currently, it is the Upper Peninsula Welcome Center.

=== 1970s renovations and Marquette memorial ===
In the mid-1970s the park entrance was moved approximately 300 feet (91 m) north on Church street to its current location, the park restroom facilities were updated, and the lower park was expanded to nearly 130 campsites while the upper park was developed into nearly 145 sites and all site were equipped with electricity. Also at this time, the bridge overlook area and trail to the upper park were created.

In 1975 the decision was made to create the Father Marquette National Memorial, in the park area west of Interstate 75. Again, it was decided to erect a pedestrian bridge across the highway to the park. The memorial and museum opened in 1980 along with interpretive trails, however no pedestrian bridge was created. In 2000 the museum was struck by lightning and burned to the ground.

=== 2000s renovations ===
In 2003 and 2004 the Parks Division of the Michigan Department of Natural Resources did renovations on the campground, closing the park for much of that period. The plan called for new facilities at all 5 bathrooms, and updating each campsite with 20, 30, and 50 amp electrical service and a level camping pad. The popular campsites along the lake shoreline were closed, bringing the number of sites to 255. However some of those sites were later reopened.

== Park features / activities ==
- Playground - There are 3 playground areas in the park. One located in the lower park just north of site numbers 48–51. A second located in the upper park located across the street from site number 187 and behind site 216. The third is located in the day use / picnic area.
- Swimming - Although swimming is allowed anywhere in the park, not many participate in this activity. This is due to the lack of actual beach area and the rocky ground of the north straits.
- Picnic Areas - The two main picnic areas are located near the day use parking area and playground, and the bridge overlook. Each area contains several grills, picnic tables, and water fountains.
- Hiking - One trail runs through park with the origin located across the street from site numbers 190 and 225. Approximately 1,000 feet (300 m) from the origin is a view of the Mackinac Bridge. At this point is where surveyors outlined the construction of the bridge and is believed to be the exact center of the bridge. The trail then continues nearly ¾ of a mile where it intercepts with the North Country Trail. From here you can backtrack the North Country Trail south to the Upper Peninsula Welcome Center or continue on east over the park road and up to the observation tower. The official park trail ends here, however the North Country Trail extends north exiting onto Church street. The park trail is marked with yellow blazes while the North Country Trail is marked with blue blazes.
- Mini Cabins - The park features 2 mini cabins for rent which sleeps four on two bunk beds and are located on either side of the lower parks’ east bathroom facility.
- Bridge Overlook - The overlook is a handicap accessible structure that allows for a side viewing of the Mackinac Bridge. There is a binocular scope available for a small fee that allows for a closer view.
- Organizational Camping - Located in the day use area, this is a primitive camping area set aside for mainly youth organizations. No electricity is available, and the maximum number allowed to camp is 60 per site. There are 2 designated areas, and one over flow area.

== Staff ==
Straits State Park is staffed by two full-time park employees consisting of the park manager and secretary, 3 seasonal park employees consisting of a lead commissioned park ranger, seasonal commissioned park ranger, a seasonal non-commissioned park ranger, and several (7-12) seasonal state workers, mainly recent high school graduates and college students living in the area.
