= Rainbow Lake Wilderness =

7,135 acre Wilderness in Wisconsin

- IUCN category Ib (wilderness area)
- Location within Wisconsin Location within the United States
- Location: Bayfield County, Wisconsin
- Nearest city: North of Drummond
- Coordinates: 46.417900°N 91.301412°W
- Area: 7,135 acres (28.9 km^{2})
- Established: 1975
- Governing body: United States Forest Service

The Rainbow Lake Wilderness is a 7,135-acre (29 km^{2}) wilderness area located within the Chequamegon unit of the Chequamegon-Nicolet National Forest. The land is in northern Wisconsin and entirely in Bayfield County. The wilderness area is operated by the United States Forest Service.

Rainbow Lake Wilderness includes Rainbow Lake, fifteen other lakes and nine small ponds. Many can be accessed by former logging trails and rail grades, including the North Country National Scenic Trail. Rainbow Lake Wilderness is entirely bordered by roads that are maintained by the Forest Service. It is heavily wooded with many species of trees including northern hardwoods, balsam fir, pine, and paper birch. Rainbow Lake Wilderness gives opportunity for visitors to fish, hike, and camp in some of what is considered old-growth forest.

== See also ==
- List of U.S. Wilderness Areas
- Wilderness Act
