= Craig Lake State Park =

Park in Michigan, USA

- Location within Michigan Location within the United States
- Location: Spurr Township, Baraga County, Michigan, Michigamme Township, Marquette County, Michigan, United States
- Nearest city: Marquette, Michigan
- Coordinates: 46°36′22″N 88°11′11″W
- Area: 9,732 acres (3,938 ha)
- Elevation: 1,706 feet (520 m)
- Established: 1967
- Administrator: Michigan Department of Natural Resources
- Designation: Michigan State Park
- Website: Official website

Craig Lake State Park is a remote public recreation area covering 9,732 acres (3,938 ha) in Baraga County in the Upper Peninsula of the state of Michigan. The state park has several lakes that are accessible only by foot or paddling.

== History ==
The property was once the private preserve of Frederick Miller, president of the Miller Brewing Company. Miller built cabins that are still in use and named three of the area's lakes after his children Teddy, Craig, and Claire. After Miller's death in 1954, the state, which already owned land in the vicinity, was able to purchase more than two thousand additional acres from his estate in 1956.

The park grew by nearly 1,300 acres (530 ha) in 2022 when the U.P. Land Conservancy gifted three parcels of pristine highlands wilderness formally known as the Peshekee Headwaters Nature Preserve to the park.

== Activities and amenities ==
The park's rugged hiking trails include an eight-mile (13 km) loop around Craig Lake and a seven-mile (11 km) stretch of the North Country National Scenic Trail. The park also offers rustic camping, fishing for muskellunge and northern pike, hunting, cross-country skiing, and snowmobiling.

Nearby protected areas include McCormick Wilderness and two areas owned by The Nature Conservancy: Wilderness Lakes Reserve and Slate River Timberlands.
