= Lake Sakakawea State Park =

Park in North Dakota, USA

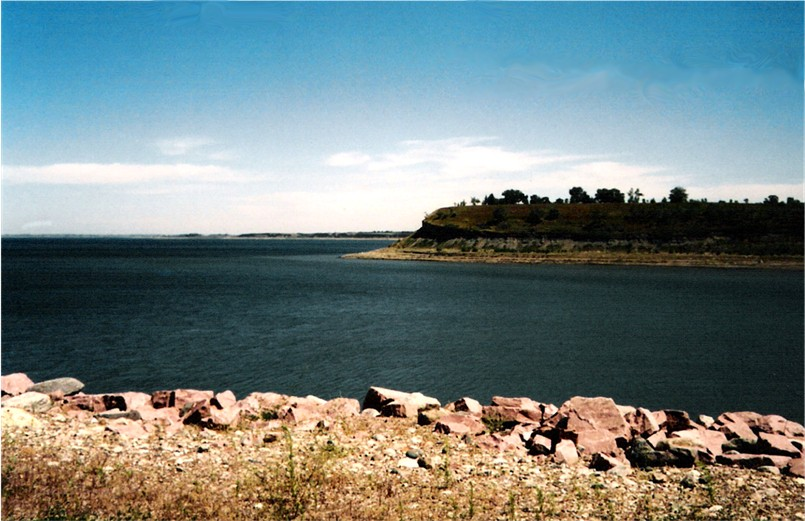
- Lake Sakakawea near Garrison Dam

- Location within North Dakota
- Location: Mercer County, North Dakota, United States
- Nearest city: Pick City, North Dakota
- Coordinates: 47°31′26″N 101°27′07″W
- Area: 739.52 acres (299.27 ha)
- Elevation: 1,841 ft (561 m)
- Established: 1965
- Administrator: North Dakota Parks and Recreation Department
- Designation: North Dakota state park
- Website: Official website

Lake Sakakawea State Park is a public recreation area occupying 739 acres (299 ha) on the southern shore of Lake Sakakawea in Mercer County, North Dakota, United States. The state park is located adjacent to the Garrison Dam, one mile (1.6 km) north of Pick City.

== History ==
The park was originally developed by the U.S. Army Corps of Engineers as Garrison Lake State Park. The North Dakota Parks and Recreation Department assumed management in 1965, then expanded the park, renaming it Lake Sakakawea State Park in 1973.

== Activities and amenities ==
The park offers hiking, swimming, fishing, boat ramps, marina, cabins, and campgrounds. The park's hiking trails include the western terminus of the 4,600-mile (7,400 km) North Country National Scenic Trail which, when completed, will cross the northern tier of the continental United States from its eastern terminus at Crown Point in upstate New York.
