= Maplewood State Park =

State park in Minnesota, United States

Coordinates: 46.533570°N 95.949219°W

- Maplewood Site
- U.S. National Register of Historic Places
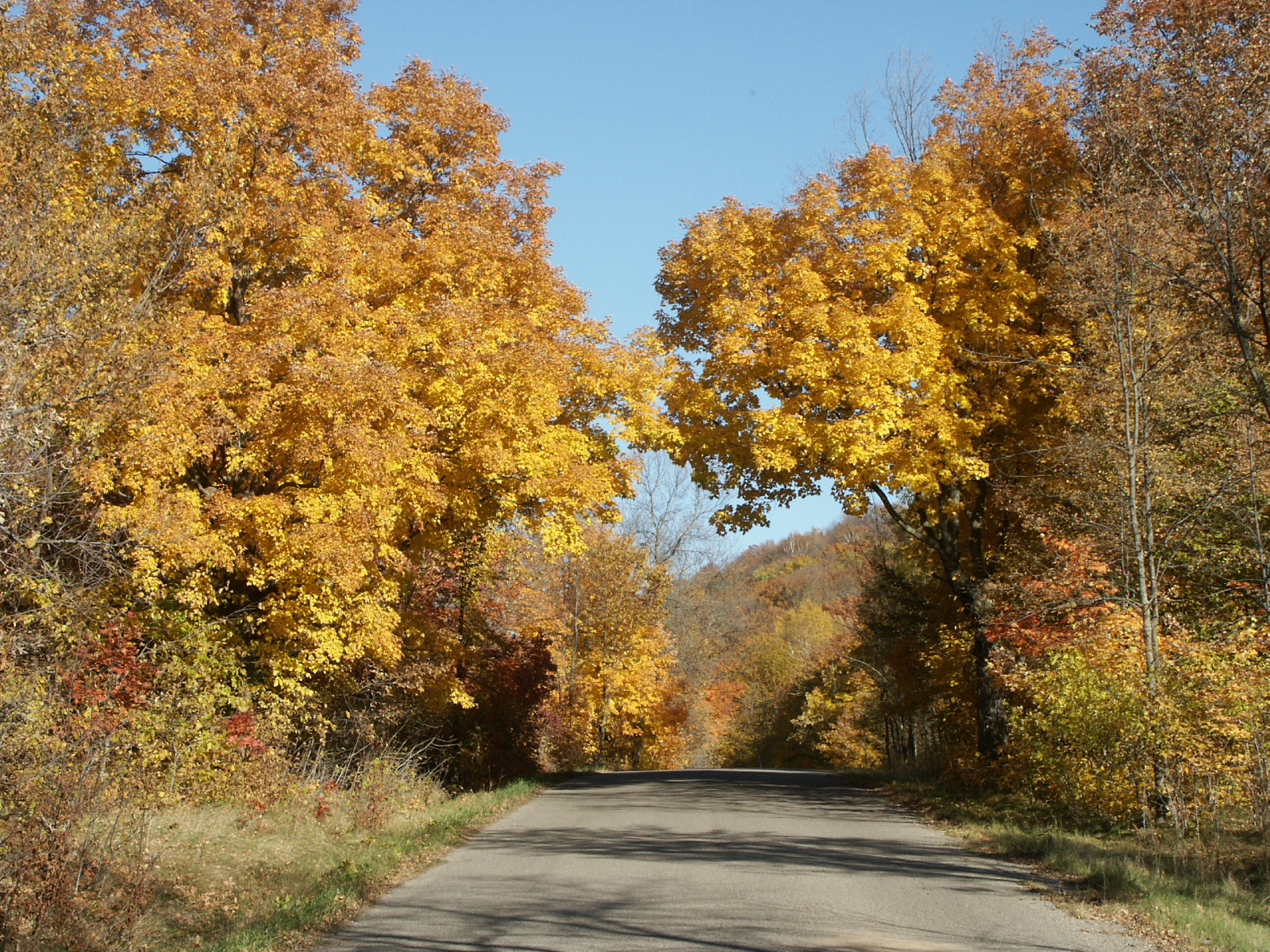
- Fall colors at Maplewood State Park
- Location: Otter Tail County, Minnesota
- Nearest city: Pelican Rapids, Minnesota
- NRHP reference No.: 78001555
- Added to NRHP: December 18, 1978

Maplewood State Park is a state park of Minnesota, United States, near Pelican Rapids. The park preserves a pre-contact habitation site that was occupied in two different periods (650–900 CE and 1450–1650 CE) in a forest/prairie transition zone. Located in the Leaf Mountains, Maplewood encompasses 9,250 acres (3,740 ha) in Otter Tail County and is known for its hardwood trees including sugar maple, basswood, American elm, and oak, which together provide a display of fall colors each year.

It became a state park in 1965, and an archeological site within the park, the Maplewood Site, was listed on the National Register of Historic Places in 1978.

== Popular culture ==
Jim Fletcher, the author of The Lore Adventure Trilogy, built several small villages with the help of students of the Pelican Rapids High School and other local people. Several of these villages are placed in Maplewood State Park. One is accessible by a hiking trail, while another is located inside one of the lakes. Those are two of the known locations, while there may be many others inside of Maplewood.

== Gallery ==
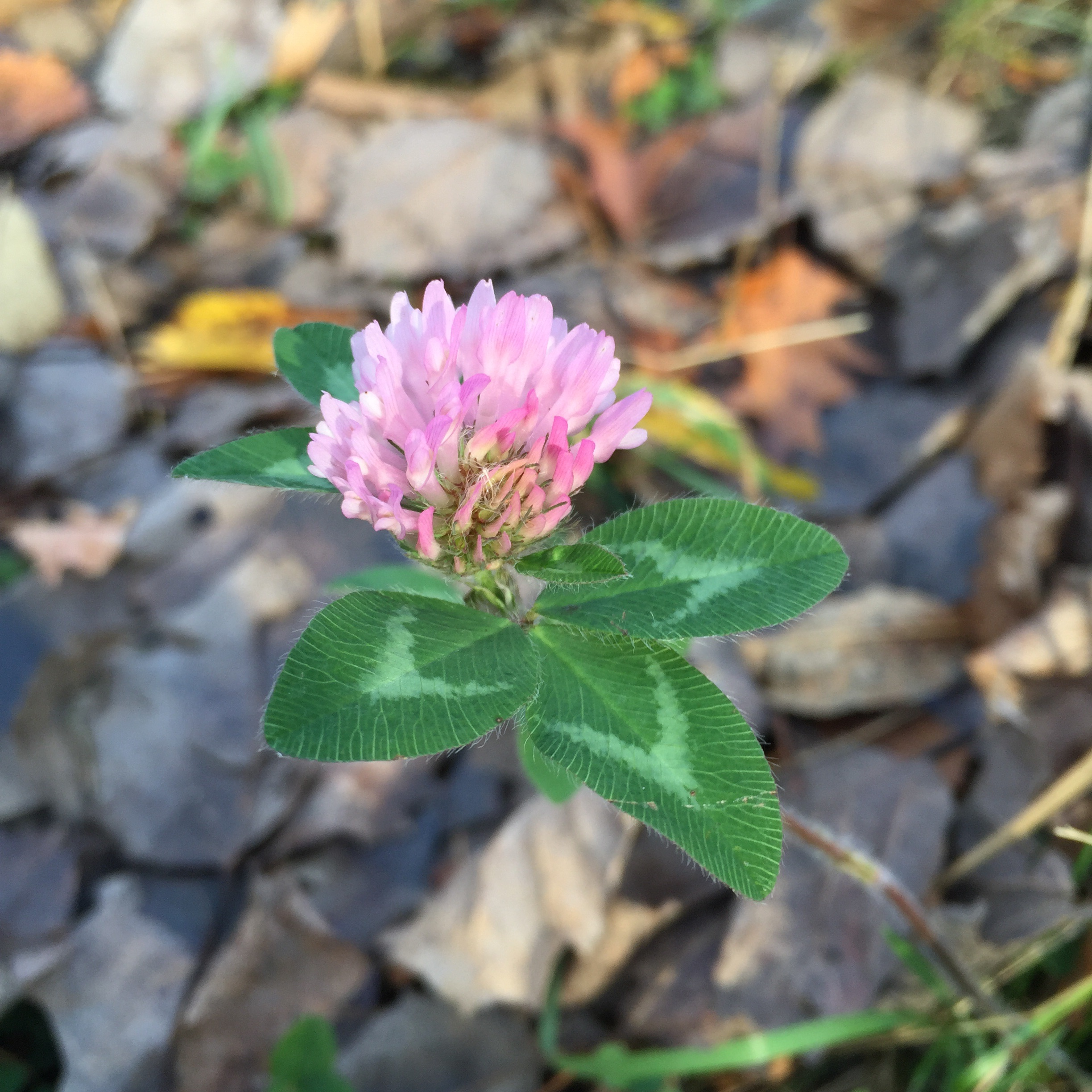
A lone flower rests among the park's fall leaves

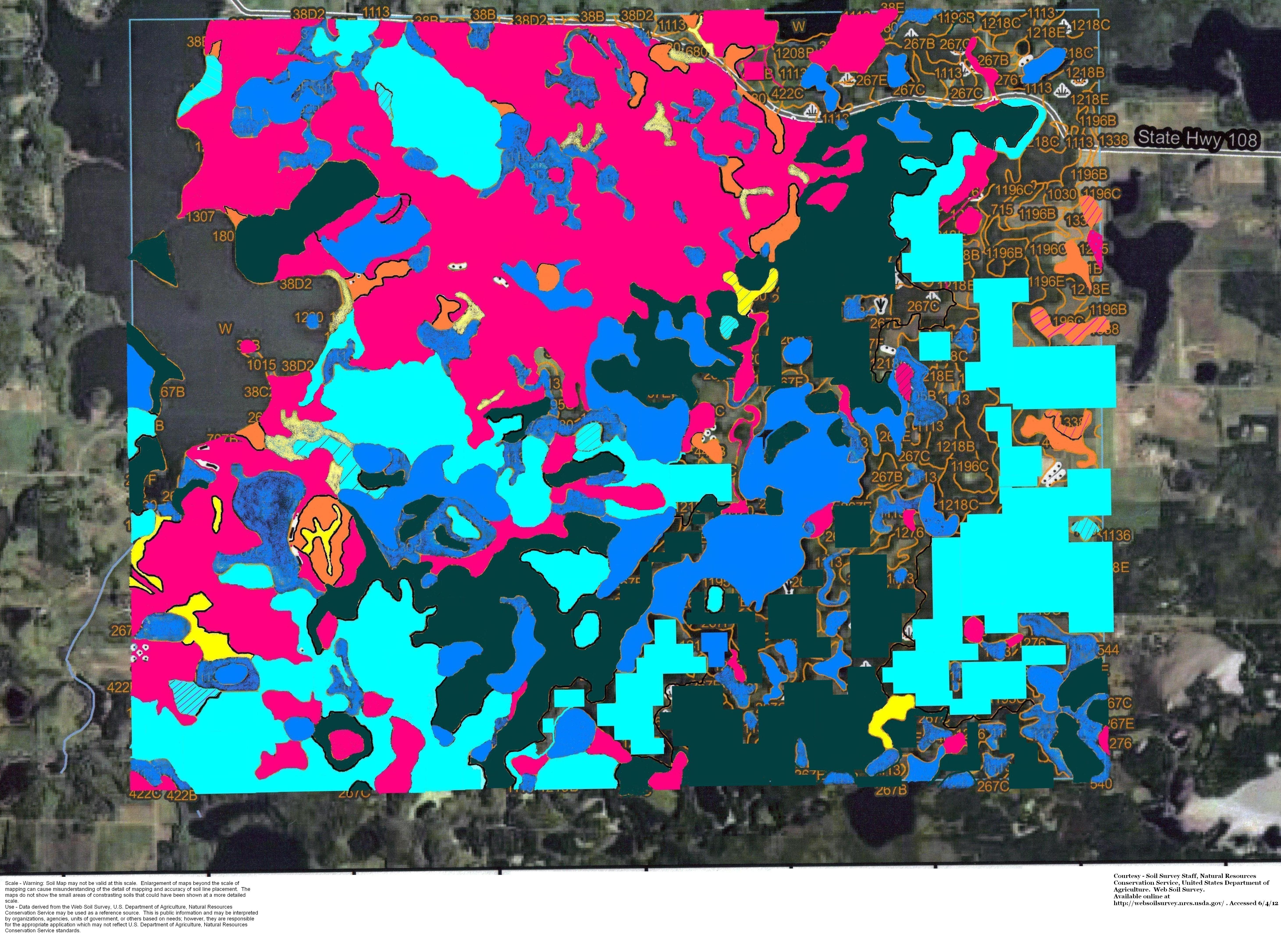
Vegetation cover map of Maplewood State Park
