= Sheyenne Lake National Wildlife Refuge =

American wildlife refuge

- IUCN category IV (habitat/species management area)
- Location within the United States
- Location: Sheridan County, North Dakota, United States
- Nearest city: Harvey, ND
- Coordinates: 47°41′57″N 100°12′37″W
- Area: 797 acres (323 ha)
- Governing body: U.S. Fish and Wildlife Service

Sheyenne Lake National Wildlife Refuge is an 800-acre (320 ha) National Wildlife Refuge (NWR) in the U.S. state of North Dakota. Sheyenne Lake NWR is an easement refuge and is on privately owned land, but the landowners and U.S. Government work cooperatively to protect the resources. The U.S. Fish and Wildlife Service oversees Sheyenne NWR from their offices at Audubon National Wildlife Refuge.
