= Almond Lake =

Lake in New York, United States

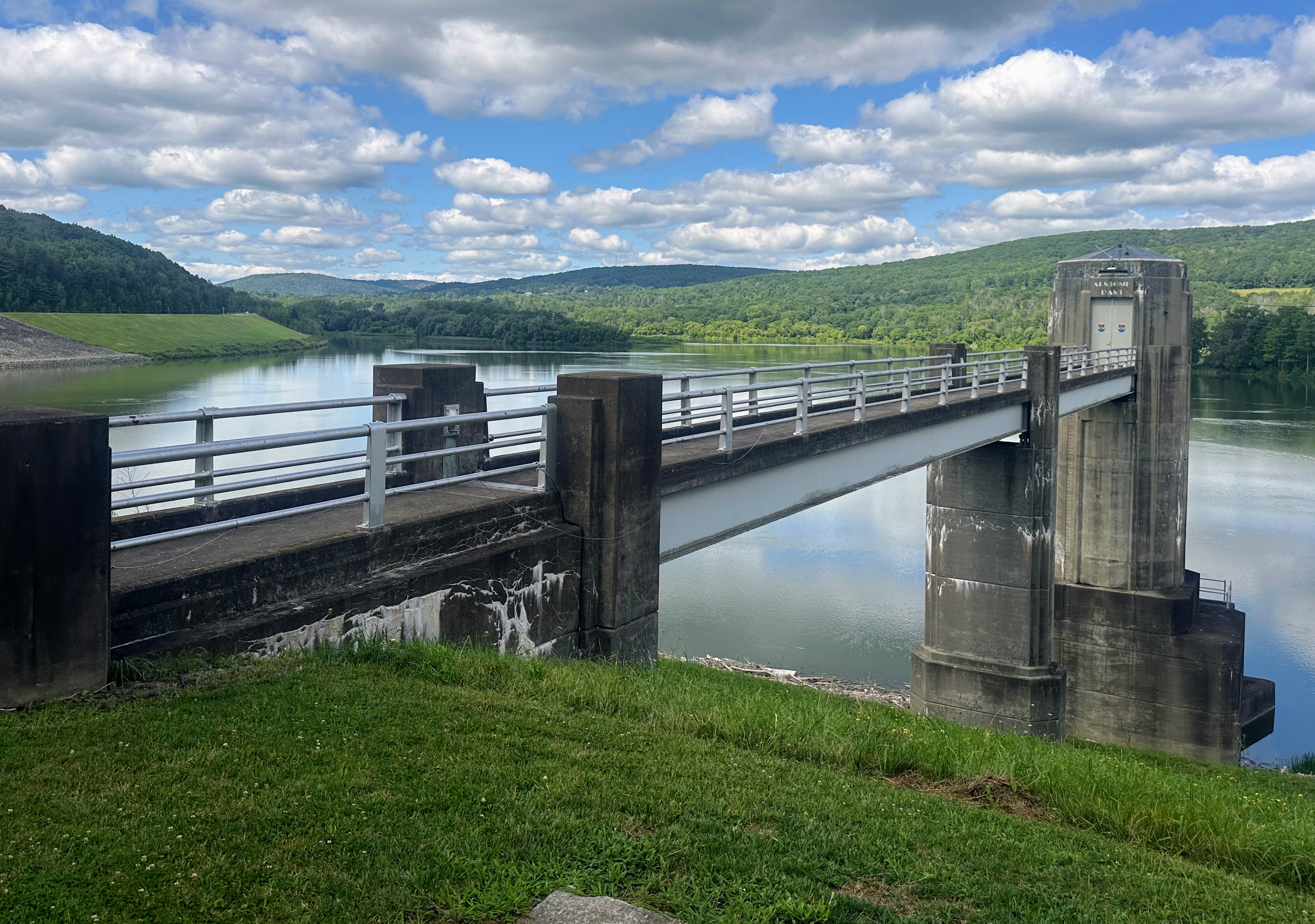
- Almond Lake, New York

- Location within New York Location within the United States
- Location: Steuben County, New York, United States
- Coordinates: 42°20′56″N 77°42′11″W
- Primary inflows: Canacadea Creek
- Primary outflows: Canacadea Creek
- Basin countries: United States
- Surface area: 480 acres (1.9 km^{2})
- Average depth: 15 feet (4.6 m)
- Max. depth: 25 ft (7.6 m)
- Shore length^{1}: 6.7 miles (10.8 km)
- Surface elevation: 1,257 ft (383 m)
- Islands: 1
- Settlements: Almond, New York
- ^{1} Shore length is not a well-defined measure.

Almond Lake also known as Almond Reservoir is a man-made lake located by Almond, New York. Fish species present in the lake include largemouth bass, yellow perch, black crappie, and pumpkinseed sunfish. There is access via boat launch in Kanakadea Recreation Area. The earthfill with concrete spillway dam was constructed in 1949.
