= Porcupine Lake Wilderness =

Protected State Wilderness in Bayfield County, Wisconsin

- Porcupine Lake
- IUCN category Ib (wilderness area)
- Location within Wisconsin Location within the United States
- Location: Bayfield, Wisconsin
- Nearest city: Drummond, WI
- Coordinates: 46°17′24″N 91°8′56″W
- Area: 4,446 acres (17.99 km^{2})
- Established: 1984
- Governing body: United States Forest Service

The Porcupine Lake Wilderness is a 4,446 acres (1,799 ha) tract of protected land located in Bayfield County, Wisconsin, managed by the United States Forest Service. The Wilderness is located within the boundaries of the Chequamegon–Nicolet National Forest.

== Porcupine Lake ==
The lake for which the Wilderness was named after has a maximum depth of 33 feet, a mean depth of 16 feet, and an area of 71 acres (29 ha), being made up of 30% muck, 30% sand, and 40% gravel. Porcupine Lake is just one of the over 10 lakes that can be found in the Wilderness.

== Flora and Fauna ==
There are several different types of trees residing in the Wilderness, the most prominent being Oak, Maple, Hemlock, and White Pine. In addition to the varied flora, in both Porcupine Lake and Eighteen Mile Spring Pond, trout, bass, and northern pike are commonly found. Besides sea dwelling fauna, deer, bears, foxes, and loons have been known to frequent the area.

== See also ==
- List of wilderness areas of the United States
