= Allegheny National Recreation Area =

Recreation area in northwestern Pennsylvania, United States

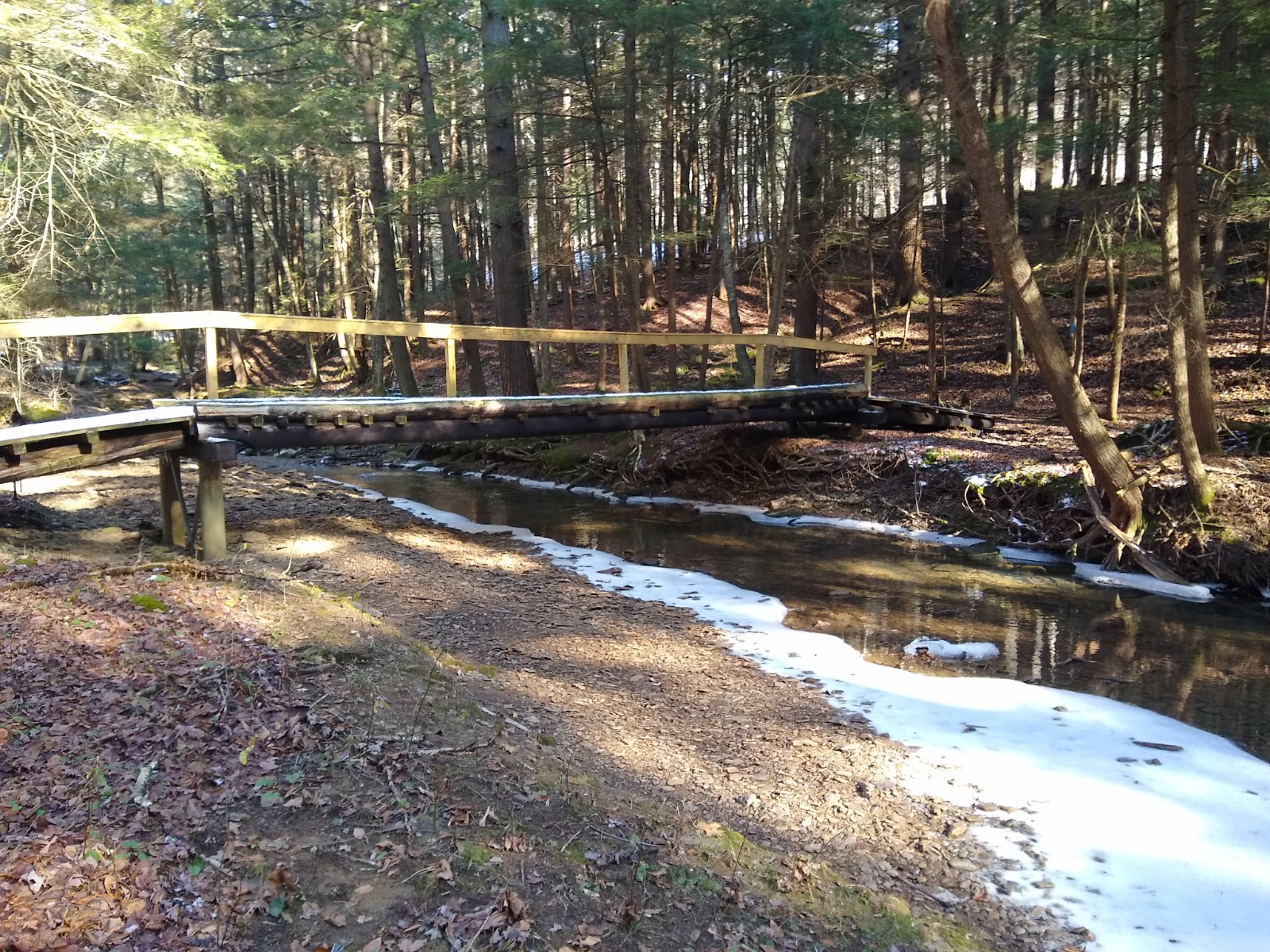
- Footbridge for the North Country Trail, over Nelse Run in the northern district of Allegheny National Recreation Area

- Location within the United States
- Interactive map of Allegheny National Recreation Area
- Location: Warren County and McKean County Pennsylvania, United States
- Nearest city: Warren, Pennsylvania
- Coordinates: 41.66°N 79.03°W
- Area: 20,152 acres (81.55 km^{2})
- Established: 1984
- Governing body: United States Forest Service

The Allegheny National Recreation Area is a national recreation area of the United States, located on the Allegheny Plateau in northwestern Pennsylvania. It is administered by the United States Forest Service as part of the Allegheny National Forest.

== Geography ==
The recreation area consists of 23,100 acres (93 km^{2}) on three separate parcels of land within the forest. It was established under the Pennsylvania Wilderness Act of 1984, by Congressman Bill Clinger, Senator Arlen Specter, and Senator John Heinz.

The national recreation area is divided into two units, one around Allegheny Reservoir upstream from Kinzua Dam, and another to the south of Warren on the east bank of the Allegheny River.

Allegheny National Recreation Area was established by the 1984 Pennsylvania Wilderness Act, Public Law 98-585.
