= Spring Valley, Ohio =

- Village
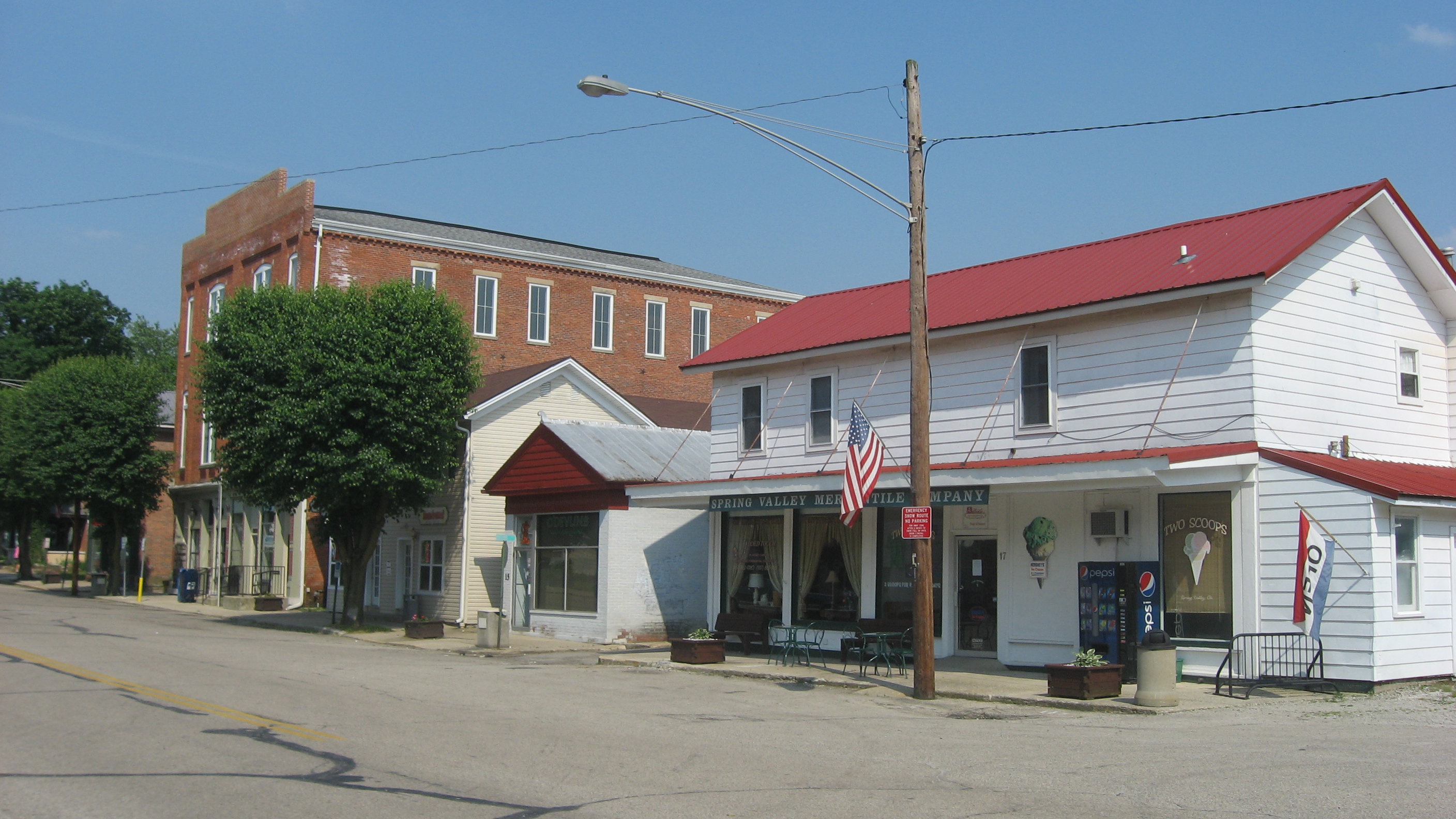
- Downtown Spring Valley

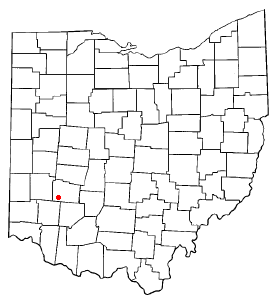
- Location of Spring Valley, Ohio

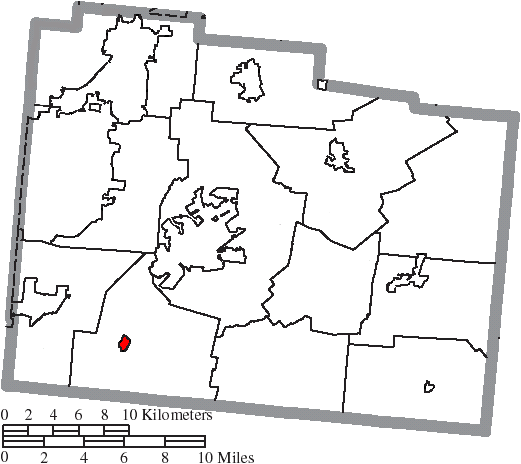
- Location of Spring Valley in Greene County
- Coordinates: 39°36′37″N 84°00′25″W
- Country: United States
- State: Ohio
- County: Greene

Area
  - Total: 0.27 sq mi (0.69 km^{2})
  - Land: 0.27 sq mi (0.69 km^{2})
  - Water: 0 sq mi (0.00 km^{2})
- Elevation: 778 ft (237 m)

Population (2020)
  - Total: 415
  - Density: 1,559/sq mi (601.8/km^{2})
- Time zone: UTC-5 (Eastern (EST))
  - Summer (DST): UTC-4 (EDT)
- ZIP code: 45370
- Area codes: 937, 326
- FIPS code: 39-74216
- GNIS feature ID: 2399878
- Website: https://www.villageofspringvalleyohio.com/

Spring Valley is a village in Greene County, Ohio, United States. The population was 415 at the 2020 census. It is part of the Dayton Metropolitan Statistical Area.

== History ==
Spring Valley had its start in the early 1840s by the building of the Little Miami Railroad through that territory. The town was platted in 1844.

== Geography ==
According to the United States Census Bureau, the village has a total area of 0.27 square miles (0.70 km^{2}), all of it land.

== Demographics ==
Historical population
Census	Pop.	Note	%±
1870	290		—
1880	376		29.7%
1890	538		43.1%
1900	522		−3.0%
1910	443		−15.1%
1920	444		0.2%
1930	478		7.7%
1940	468		−2.1%
1950	645		37.8%
1960	678		5.1%
1970	667		−1.6%
1980	541		−18.9%
1990	507		−6.3%
2000	510		0.6%
2010	479		−6.1%
2020	415		−13.4%
U.S. Decennial Census

=== 2010 census ===
As of the census of 2010, there were 479 people, 198 households, and 136 families living in the village. The population density was 1,774.1 inhabitants per square mile (685.0/km^{2}). There were 221 housing units at an average density of 818.5 per square mile (316.0/km^{2}). The racial makeup of the village was 97.3% White, 0.2% African American, 0.2% Native American, 0.2% from other races, and 2.1% from two or more races. Hispanic or Latino of any race were 0.8% of the population.

There were 198 households, of which 26.8% had children under the age of 18 living with them, 54.0% were married couples living together, 9.6% had a female householder with no husband present, 5.1% had a male householder with no wife present, and 31.3% were non-families. 23.7% of all households were made up of individuals, and 5% had someone living alone who was 65 years of age or older. The average household size was 2.42 and the average family size was 2.83.

The median age in the village was 43.8 years. 19.4% of residents were under the age of 18; 6.9% were between the ages of 18 and 24; 24.7% were from 25 to 44; 34.7% were from 45 to 64; and 14.4% were 65 years of age or older. The gender makeup of the village was 50.3% male and 49.7% female.

=== 2000 census ===
As of the census of 2000, there were 510 people, 195 households, and 147 families living in the village. The population density was 1,832.9 inhabitants per square mile (707.7/km^{2}). There were 211 housing units at an average density of 758.3 per square mile (292.8/km^{2}). The racial makeup of the village was 95.88% White, 1.76% African American, 0.39% Native American, 0.20% Asian, and 1.76% from two or more races.

There were 195 households, out of which 33.3% had children under the age of 18 living with them, 60.5% were married couples living together, 8.2% had a female householder with no husband present, and 24.6% were non-families. 20.0% of all households were made up of individuals, and 6.2% had someone living alone who was 65 years of age or older. The average household size was 2.62 and the average family size was 2.99.

In the village, the population was spread out, with 23.7% under the age of 18, 10.2% from 18 to 24, 30.8% from 25 to 44, 23.7% from 45 to 64, and 11.6% who were 65 years of age or older. The median age was 38 years. For every 100 females there were 103.2 males. For every 100 females age 18 and over, there were 98.5 males.

The median income for a household in the village was $42,500, and the median income for a family was $44,231. Males had a median income of $31,382 versus $26,250 for females. The per capita income for the village was $26,071. About 1.4% of families and 2.8% of the population were below the poverty line, including 3.4% of those under age 18 and none of those age 65 or over.
