= Pennsylvania State Game Lands Number 226 =

Park in the United States

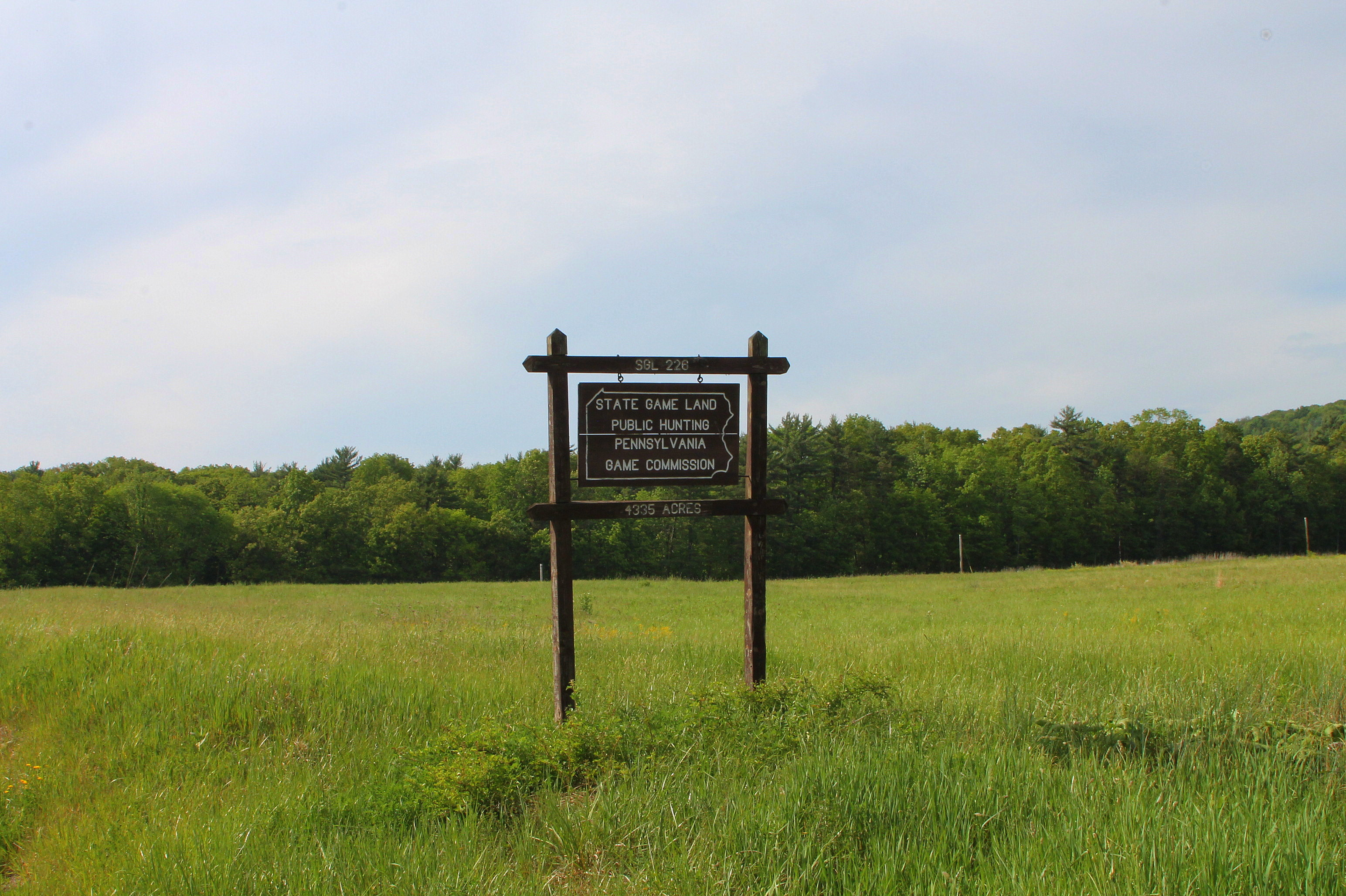
- Pennsylvania State Game Lands Number 226 sign

- Location within Pennsylvania
- Location: Pine Township and Madison Township, Columbia County, Pennsylvania
- Nearest city: Millville
- Coordinates: 41°7′53″N 76°35′44″W
- Area: 4,335 acres (1,754 ha)
- Designation: Pennsylvania State Game Lands
- Owner: Pennsylvania Game Commission

Pennsylvania State Game Lands Number 226 are Pennsylvania State Game Lands in Columbia County, Pennsylvania. They have an area of 4,335 acres (1,754 ha). The terrain of the game lands mainly consists of woodlots and food plots. Streams such as Spruce Run and East Branch Chillisquaque Creek are within their boundaries. The main game animals in these game lands include deer, grouse, squirrel, and turkey.

== Geography ==
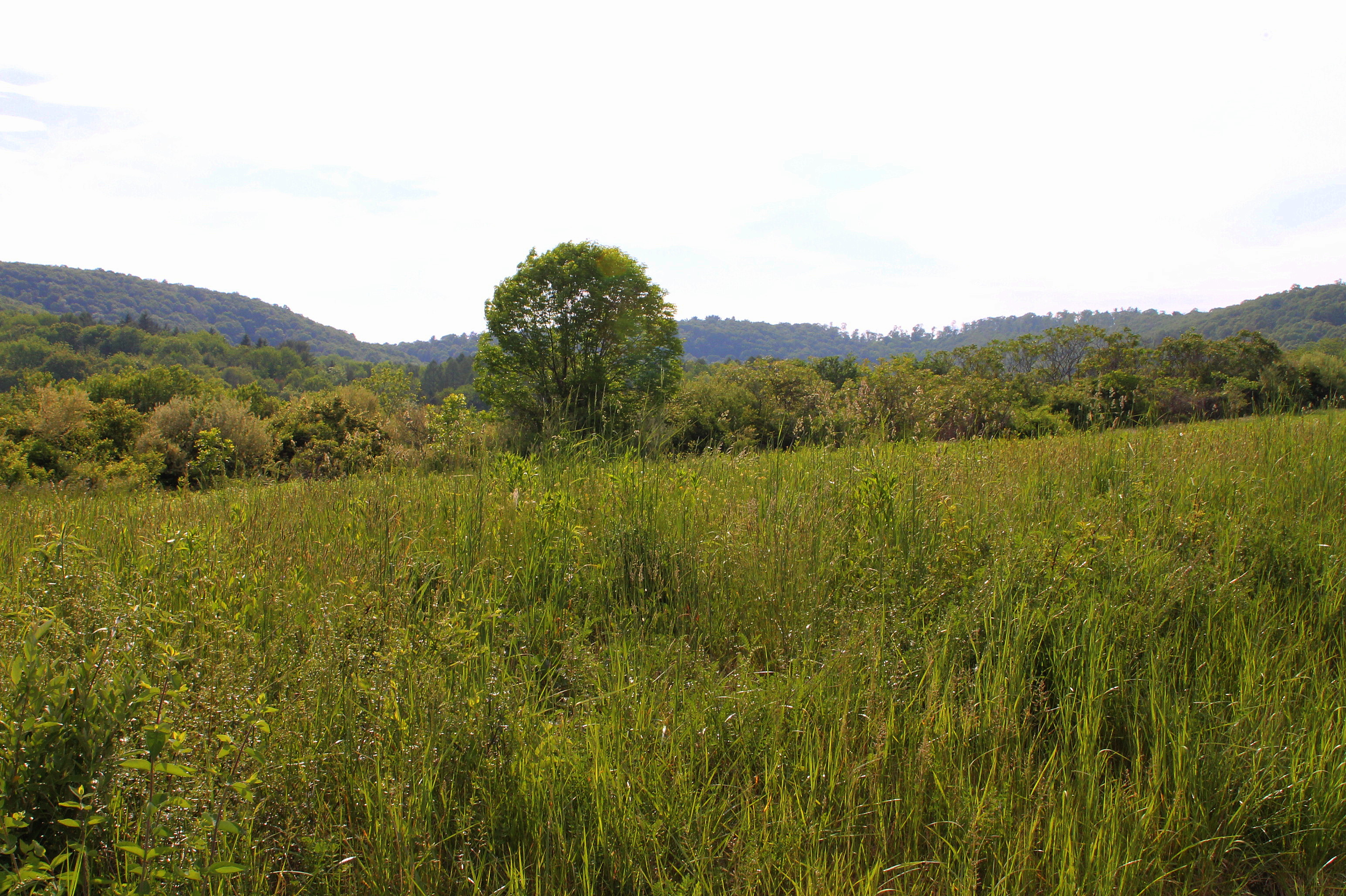
Scenery of Pennsylvania State Game Lands Number 226

Pennsylvania State Game Lands Number 226 have an area of 4,335 acres (1,754 ha), making them the third-largest state game lands in Columbia County. They are located within Pine Township and Madison Township in northwestern Columbia County, near Millville. Their northernmost reaches are near the border between Columbia County and Lycoming County.

The terrain in Pennsylvania State Game Lands Number 226 largely consists of woodlots and food plots, with much habitat work being done in the area by the Food and Cover Corps. However, the food plots are small due to a lack of manpower or funds to maintain them. In 2001, there were a dozen of them. There are also some fields within their boundaries.

Pennsylvania Route 42, Pennsylvania Route 44, and Pennsylvania Route 254 are all within a few miles of Pennsylvania State Game Lands Number 226. Numerous two-lane roads crisscross the game lands as well. These include State Road 4023, Spruce Run Road, Gillespie Road, and Ants Hill Road. Their northern part is in the Muncy Hills. Several hollows in the hills are also in the game lands. Streams such as East Branch Chillisquaque Creek and Spruce Run are also within their boundaries. The elevation of the game lands at their official coordinates is 1,066 feet (325 m) above sea level. The area is mostly at relatively low elevations.

Pennsylvania State Game Lands Number 226 are in the United States Geological Survey quadrangle of Lairdsville.

== Biology ==
The main game animals in Pennsylvania State Game Lands Number 226 include bear, deer, grouse, rabbits, squirrels, wild turkeys, and stocked pheasants. The game lands are managed for small game. Part of the game lands are in the Wild Pheasant Recovery Area for central Pennsylvania. Doves and woodchucks are also sometimes hunted there.

The main bird species in Pennsylvania State Game Lands Number 226 include ring-necked pheasant, ruffed grouse, northern cardinal, American woodcock, eastern bluebird, house wren, eastern towhee, blue-headed vireo, two warbler species, and two sparrow species. Three additional warbler species inhabit shrubs in the game lands and whip-poor-will, pileated woodpecker, and numerous other species are found in the forests. The game land's fields are inhabited by birds such as the eastern meadowlark and the bobolink. In the winter, American robins, Carolina wrens, and winter wrens visit the game lands.

Plant life in Pennsylvania State Game Lands Number 226 include successional woodlands and hedgerows, as well as warm season grass plots. Deciduous forests containing hemlock and white pine are also present in the game lands. Corn and sorghum are grown in food plots in the area and have been since at least 2012. The plant species Aplectrum hyemale, which is rare in Pennsylvania and extremely rare in northern Pennsylvania, is found in the game lands.

In the upper reaches of Spruce Run in Pennsylvania State Game Lands Number 226, there are hemlock and mixed hardwood forests. Hardwood trees in this area include sugar maple, white ash, black birch, yellow birch, black cherry, basswood, and beech. At least 15 fern species, 12 sedge species, and more than 60 other woodland herbs inhabit the area. However, there are also invasive plants such as multiflora rose and autumn olive.

== History ==
Pennsylvania State Game Lands Number 226 were specifically managed for cottontail rabbits as early as 1964, making them one of three state game lands in Northeastern Pennsylvania being managed for them at the time. In the 1960s, 22 tracts of land in the game lands were prepared for shrub planting. Shrubs, grasses, and legumes were experimentally grown in the area around this time.

A controlled fire was carried out in Pennsylvania State Game Lands Number 226 on April 10, 2014.

== Recreation ==
Pennsylvania State Game Lands Number 226 have 4.3 miles (6.9 km) of hiking trails from Ridge Road to Spruce Run Road to Dodson Hill Road via some loops. There are also 3 miles (4.8 km) of trails from Gilespie Road to Engles Road. The game lands have 12 miles (19 km) of snowmobile trails. There are 14 parking areas within its boundaries. The game lands are mainly accessed via Pennsylvania Route 442 from the north and Pennsylvania Route 44 from the southwest. They are described as "very accessible".

A junior pheasant hunt occurs annually in Pennsylvania State Game Lands Number 226.

According to Tim Conway, who was the Northeast Region's Information and Education Supervisor in 2010, Pennsylvania State Game Lands Number 226 are the most suitable public lands for dove hunting in Columbia County or Montour County.

== See also ==
- Pennsylvania State Game Lands Number 13, also in Columbia County
- Pennsylvania State Game Lands Number 55, also in Columbia County
- Pennsylvania State Game Lands Number 58, also in Columbia County
- Pennsylvania State Game Lands Number 329, also in Columbia County
