= Bermuda towhee =

Bermuda towhee Temporal range: Pleistocene-Holocene

Conservation status
- Extinct (1612) (IUCN 3.1)

Scientific classification
- Kingdom: Animalia
- Phylum: Chordata
- Class: Aves
- Order: Passeriformes
- Family: Passerellidae
- Genus: Pipilo
- Species: †P. naufragus

Binomial name
- †Pipilo naufragus Olson & Wingate, 2012

Synonyms
- Pipilo sp. undescribed Olson & Hearty, 2009

Extinct species of bird

The Bermuda towhee (Pipilo naufragus) is an extinct bird of the towhee genus Pipilo that was endemic to Bermuda.

== Taxonomy ==
It was a large member of the genus and closely related to the eastern towhee. The species was scientifically described in 2012, based on Pleistocene and Holocene remains from Quaternary cave deposits. 38 bones from at least five individuals are known.

== History ==
An old travel report by William Strachey who was shipwrecked on Bermuda from 1609 to 1610 might refer to that species. He wrote in 1625:

Sparrowes fat and plumpe like a Bunting, bigger then ours.

The exact cause for its extinction is unknown, but it most definitely became extinct soon after human arrival to Bermuda in the early 1600s. Its decline is thought to have been accelerated by predation from invasive species.
