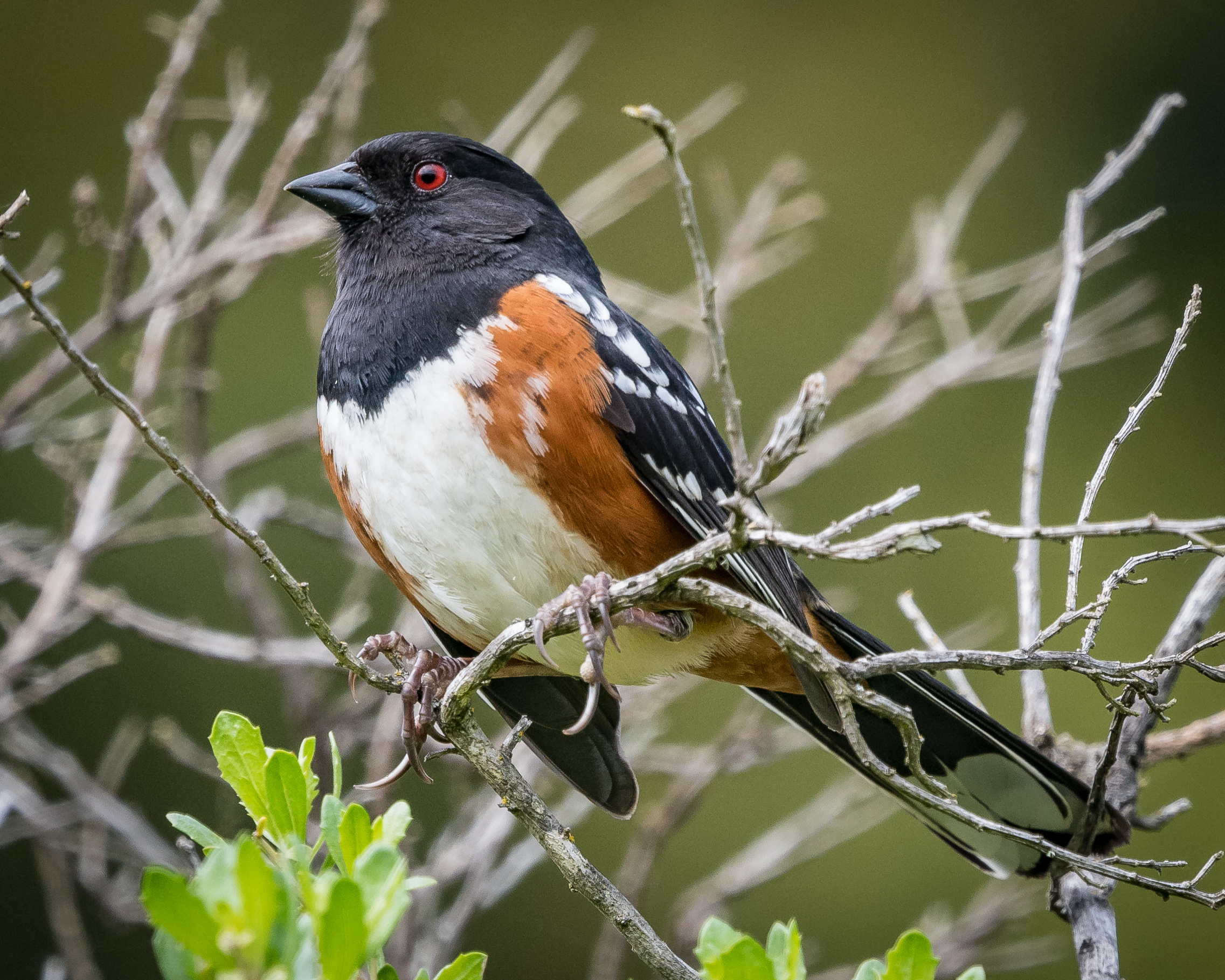

Conservation status
- Least Concern (IUCN 3.1)

Scientific classification
- Kingdom: Animalia
- Phylum: Chordata
- Class: Aves
- Order: Passeriformes
- Family: Passerellidae
- Genus: Pipilo
- Species: P. maculatus

Binomial name
- Pipilo maculatus Swainson, 1827
- Breeding Year-round Nonbreeding Nonbreeding (scarce)

= Spotted towhee =

Species of bird

The spotted towhee (Pipilo maculatus) is a large New World sparrow. The taxonomy of the towhees has been debated in recent decades, and until 1995 this bird and the eastern towhee were considered a single species, then named rufous-sided towhee. Another outdated name for the spotted towhee is the Oregon towhee (particularly for the subspecies Pipilo maculatus oregonus). The call may be harsher and more varied than for the eastern towhee.

== Description ==
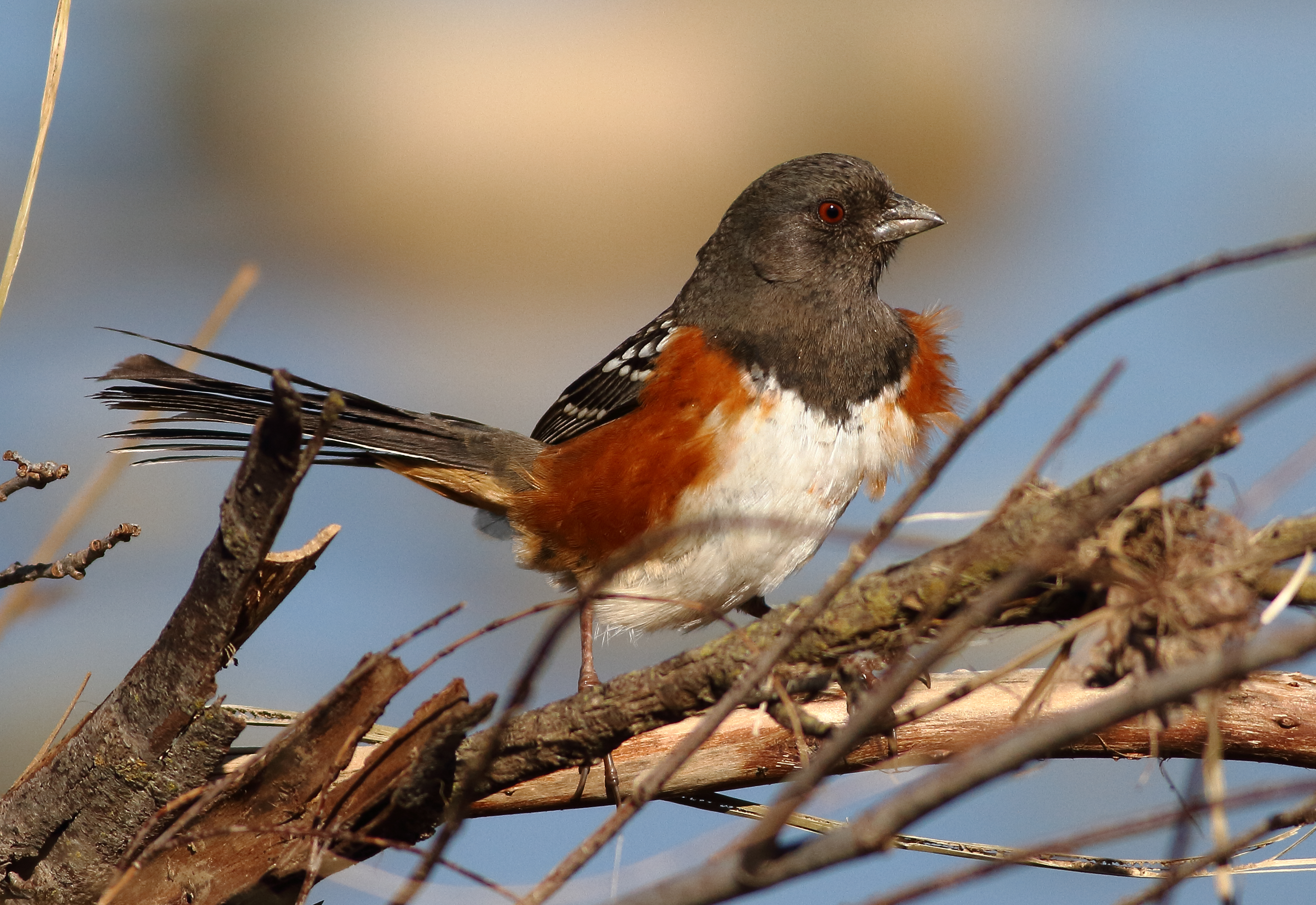
Female in Sacramento, California

The spotted towhee is a large New World sparrow, roughly the same size as a gray catbird. It has a long, dark, fan-shaped tail with white corners on the end. It has a round body (similar to New World sparrows) with bright red eyes and dull pink legs. The spotted towhee is between 17 cm (6.7 in) and 21 cm (8.3 in) long, and weighs in at between 33 g (1.2 oz) and 49 g (1.7 oz). It has a wingspan of 28 cm (11 in).

Adult males have a generally darker head, upper body and tail with a white belly, rufous sides, white spots on their back and white wing bars. Females look similar but are dark brown and grey instead of black. The spotted towhee has white spots on its primary and secondary feathers; the eastern towhee is the same in terms of its size and structure but does not have white spots, though does have a white base on the primary feathers, absent in spotted towhee.

== Distribution and habitat ==
The spotted towhee lives in dry upland forests, open forests, brushy fields, and chaparrals. It breeds across north-western North America and is present year-round in California, Nevada, Arizona, Utah, Oregon, Washington, Idaho and southern British Columbia. It is not found in arid climates and as a result does not reside in the Sonoran Desert, but resides in northern Arizona and the entirety of California except the southeast corner that borders Arizona. It has also been known to expand as far eastward as western Iowa and southwestern Minnesota. It also occurs in fringe wetland forests and riparian forests near the border of upland forests. Because the spotted towhee's habitat overlaps with areas of the United States that experience regular forest fires (Arizona, New Mexico, California), it tends to be found in unburned chaparral and avoids chaparral and forests which have been burned due to lack of ground cover and minimal foraging ability. Spotted towhees will be present in an area that is recovering after a burn (less than 15 years old), due to excellent ground cover and ease of ground foraging from the recovering understory vegetation, although populations will decrease after a forest fire until the vegetation has grown back.

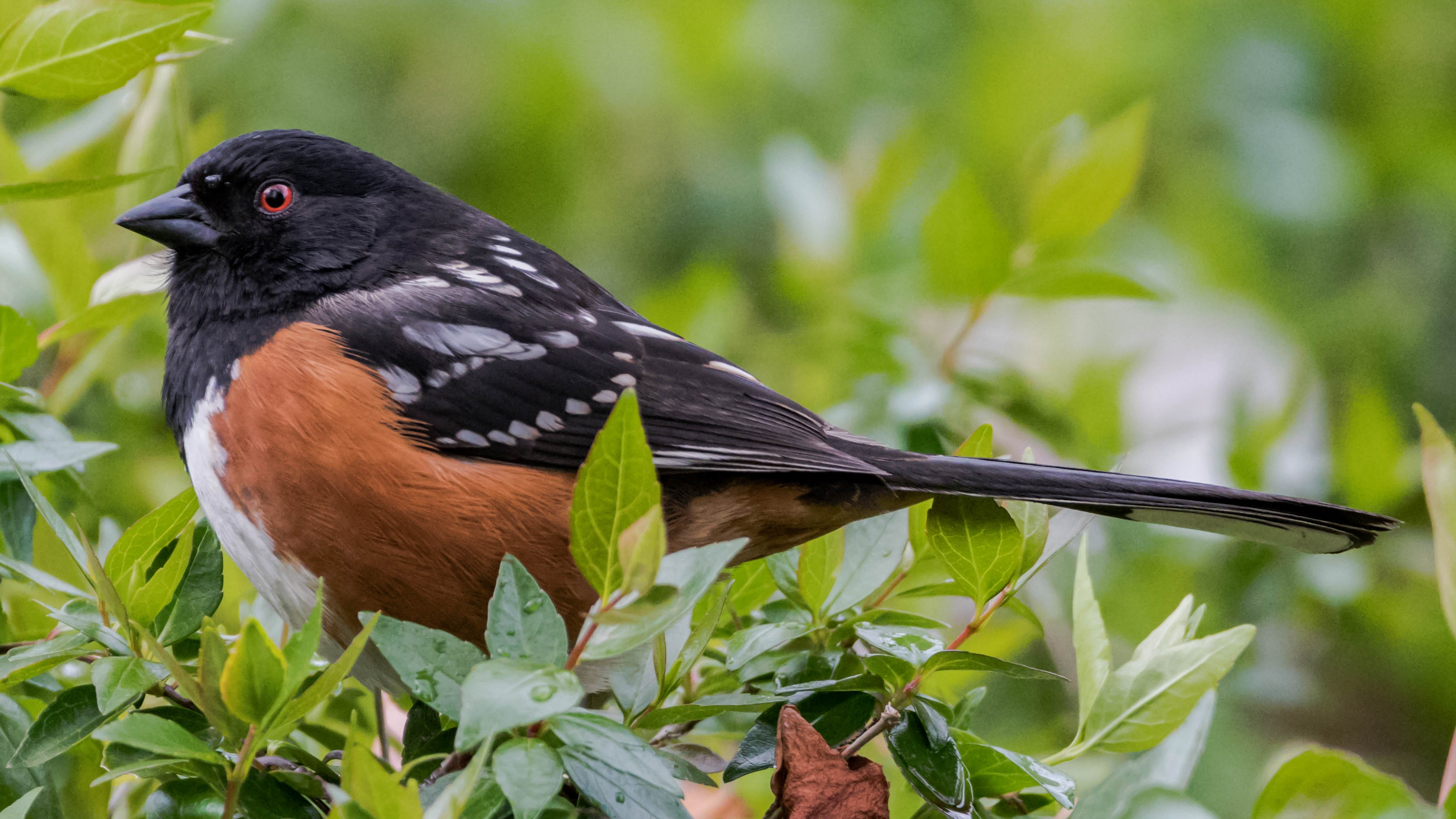
Spotted towhee at Vasona Park

Its breeding habitat in the southwest is largely dependent on coastal sage scrub, as it provides cover from predators. It migrates to northern and northwestern United States and southwestern Canada to breed in scrubland, parks and suburban gardens. Northwestern birds migrate eastwards to the central plains of the United States, mostly the northwestern-central Great Plains. In other areas, some birds may move to lower elevations in the winter. Their breeding habitat is chaparral, thickets or shrubby areas across western North America. Spotted towhee hybridizes with eastern towhee where their ranges overlap in the Midwest (mainly in Nebraska, and North and South Dakota), and with collared towhee where their ranges overlap in southwestern Mexico.

== Taxonomy ==
A total of 21 subspecies are recognised:

- P. m. oregonus Bell, JG, 1849 – breeds coastal southwestern British Columbia to southwestern Oregon; winters to southern California
- P. m. falcifer McGregor, RC, 1900 – coastal northern California (Del Norte to Santa Cruz and San Benito counties)
- P. m. megalonyx Baird, SF, 1858 – coastal southern California (Monterey) to northwestern Baja California and Santa Cruz Island
- P. m. clementae Grinnell, J, 1897 – Santa Rosa, Santa Catalina (or Owariki), and San Clemente islands (off southern California)
- P. m. umbraticola Grinnell, J & Swarth, HS, 1926 – northwestern Baja California (latitude 32°N to 30°N)
- † P. m. consobrinus Ridgway, R, 1876 – formerly Isla Guadalupe (off western Baja California); extinct, last observed in 1897
- P. m. magnirostris Brewster, W, 1891 – mountains of southern Baja California (Sierra de la Laguna)
- P. m. curtatus Grinnell, J, 1911 – southeastern British Columbia to northeastern California, Nevada, and Idaho; winters to southeastern California
- P. m. falcinellus Swarth, HS, 1913 – interior southwestern Oregon to Sierra Nevada and San Joaquin Valley
- P. m. arcticus (Swainson, WJ, 1832) – Great Plains of North America to southwestern US; winters to northeastern Mexico
- P. m. montanus Swarth, HS, 1905 – southwestern US to northwestern Mexico; winters to northern Mexico
- P. m. gaigei Van Tyne, J & Sutton, GM, 1937 – mountains of New Mexico, western Texas, and northern Mexico (northern Coahuila)
- P. m. griseipygius Van Rossem, AJ, 1934 – mountains of western Mexico (Sierra Madre Occidental)
- P. m. orientalis Sibley, CG, 1950 – mountains of eastern Mexico (Sierra Madre Oriental)
- P. m. maculatus Swainson, WJ, 1827 – eastern Mexico
- P. m. vulcanorum Sibley, CG, 1950 – mountains of central Mexico (México, northeastern Morelos, southwestern Tlaxcala, and western Puebla)
- P. m. oaxacae Sibley, CG, 1950 – highlands of southern Mexico (northern and central Oaxaca)
- P. m. chiapensis Van Rossem, AJ, 1938 – mountains of southern Mexico (central Chiapas)
- P. m. repetens Griscom, L, 1930 – mountains of southern Mexico (southeastern Chiapas) and western Guatemala
- P. m. macronyx Swainson, WJ, 1827 – mountains of central Mexico (eastern Michoacán, México, Morelos, and Distrito Federal)
- P. m. socorroensis Grayson, AJ, 1867 – Socorro Island (Revillagigedo Islands off western Mexico)

Individuals in the Socorro Island population P. m. socorroensis are smaller than other spotted towhees, and show distinctive gray upper-parts. That population is sometimes treated as a species, the Socorro towhee (Pipilo socorroensis).

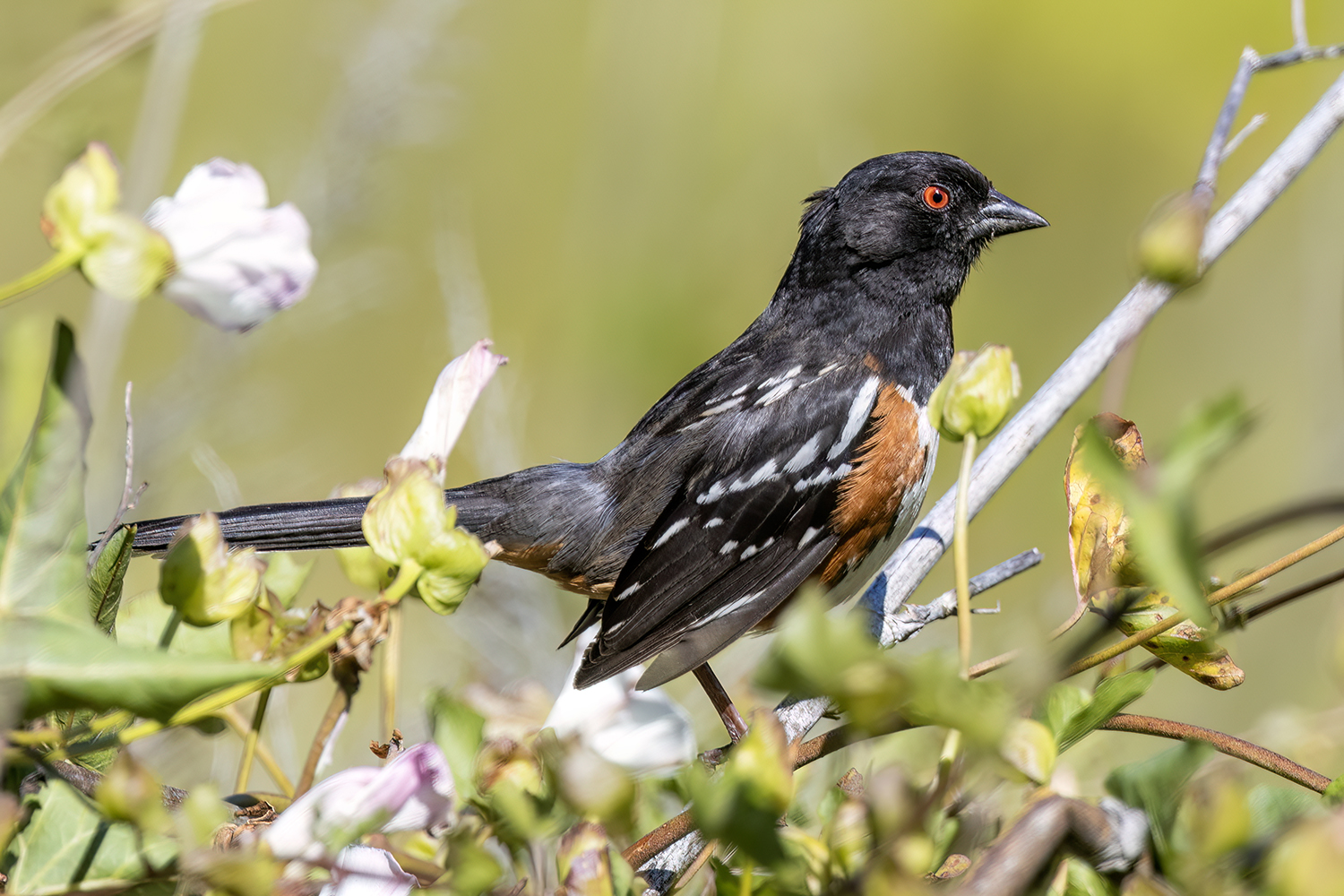
P. m. megalonyx on Santa Cruz Island

== Behavior ==
=== Breeding and nesting ===
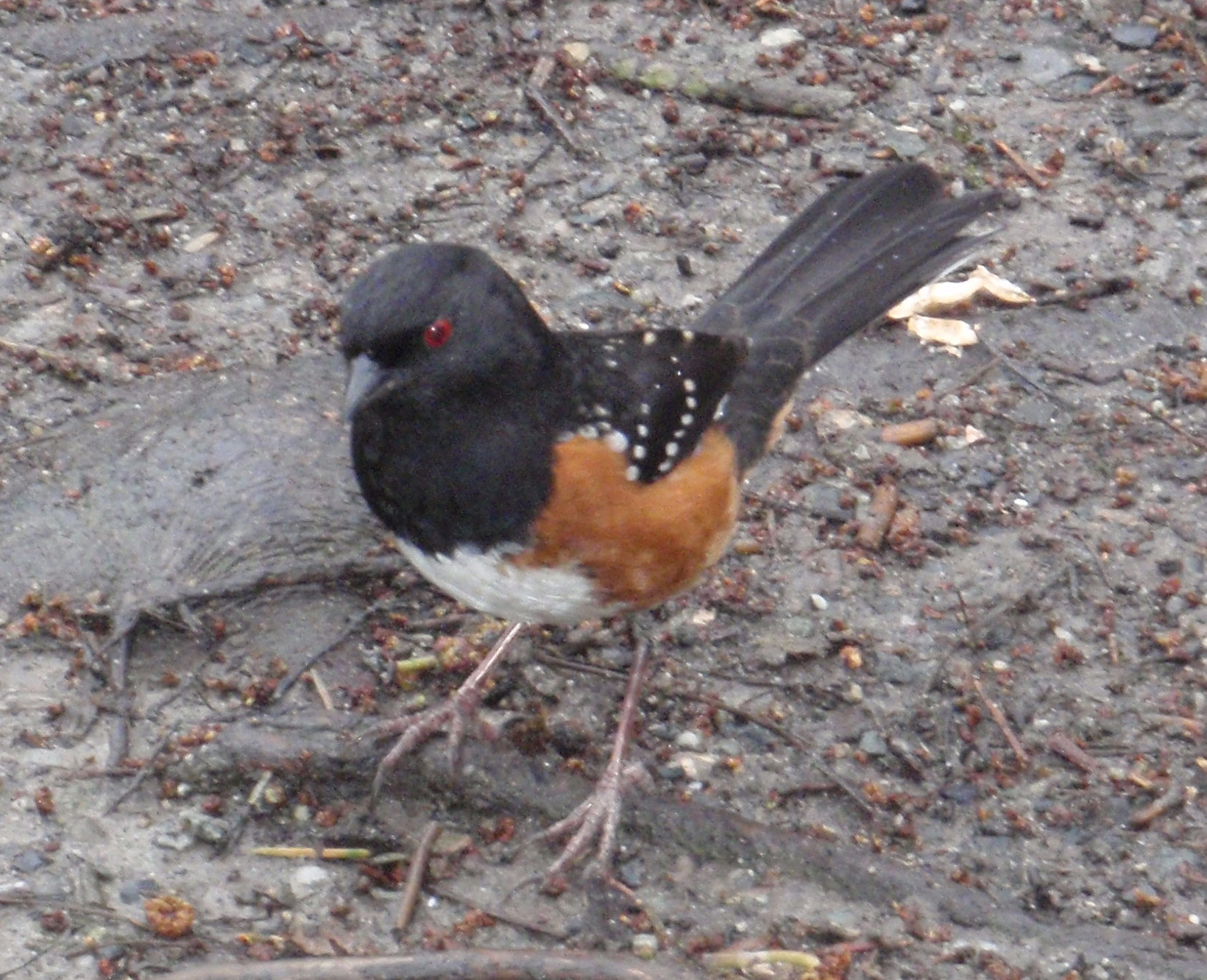
Spotted towhees forage on the ground or in low vegetation.

They nest either on the ground or low in bushes, seldom more than 1.5 m (5 ft) above the ground and most nests are around 40 cm (1.3 ft) above the ground. The location for the nests is usually found in exposed areas, but conceal the nest as it is being built. The female builds the nest over a period of about five days. It is bulky and sturdily made of leaves, strips of bark, twigs, forb stalks, and grasses, lined with pine needles, shredded bark, grass, and sometimes hair. It is usually 11 cm (4.5 in) in diameter with an inner ring of 6.4 cm (2.5 in) to 10 cm (4 in). The nests are built so the rim is at ground level and the nest is 6.4 cm (2.5 in) deep.

At least two broods, consisting of three to five eggs, are laid per season. The egg shells are grayish or creamy-white, sometimes with a tinge of green, with reddish brown spots that can form a wreath or cap. The eggs are slightly oblong, with their dimensions being 2 cm (0.79 in) to 2.6 cm (1.0 in) long and 1.7 cm (0.67 in) to 1.9 cm (0.75 in) wide. The female incubates the eggs alone for 12 to 14 days; the young leave the nest at 10 to 12 days. Nests are parasitized by cowbirds.

=== Diet ===
A spotted towhee finds an anise swallowtail caterpillar to return to its nest and feed to its young.

These birds forage on the ground or in low vegetation, with a habit of noisily rummaging through dry leaves searching for food. During the breeding season (spring and summer) they mainly eat insects, ground dwelling beetles, spiders and other arthropods that reside in the leaf litter that is foraged by the spotted towhee. They only eat protein rich food in the breeding season, and in the fall and winter they focus on foraging for acorns, seeds, oats, and berries. They will frequent bird feeders if present in their woodland habitat.

=== Threats ===
Their main predators in less developed areas are ground dwelling snakes because nests are built on the ground. There is a strong relationship between the number of snakes that a nest encounters and the lowered probability of young chicks fledgling. In developed areas and habitat near urban development their main predators are household cats.

Spotted towhee song
Spotted towhee singing in the Black Hills of South Dakota, with western meadowlark in the background
