= Pennsylvania State Game Lands Number 329 =

Park in the United States

- Location within Pennsylvania
- Location: southern Columbia County, Pennsylvania
- Nearest city: Aristes
- Coordinates: 40°49′35″N 76°17′40″W
- Area: 1,744 acres (706 ha)
- Designation: Pennsylvania State Game Lands
- Owner: Pennsylvania Game Commission

Pennsylvania State Game Lands Number 329 are Pennsylvania State Game Lands in Columbia County and Schuylkill County, in Pennsylvania, in the United States. They have an area of 1,146 acres (464 ha). The game lands are mainly forested, but there is also some farmland. Little Catawissa Creek passes through them. The main game animals in these game lands include bear, deer, grouse, squirrel, and turkey.

== Geography ==
Pennsylvania State Game Lands #329 have an area of 1,146 acres (464 ha), making them the smallest state game lands in Columbia County. They are located near Aristes, at a distance of 0.25 miles (0.40 km), and are in Conyngham Township, Columbia County, Roaring Creek Township, Columbia County, and Union Township, Schuylkill County. The borough of Centralia is to the southwest of the game lands.

The terrain in Pennsylvania State Game Lands #329 is predominantly forested. However, there are also some tracts of farmland. The topography of the game lands ranges from flat to steep.

Pennsylvania Route 42 passes fairly close to Pennsylvania State Game Lands #329. A stream known as Little Catawissa Creek also passes through the game lands. Of the 17.45 square miles (45.2 km^{2}) of public land in the watershed of Mahanoy Creek, a total of 0.004 square miles (10,000 m^{2}) is Pennsylvania State Game Lands #329. Most of the land in the game lands is to the north of the watershed.

== Biology ==
The main game animals in Pennsylvania State Game Lands #329 include bear, deer, grouse, squirrel, and wild turkey. Cottontail rabbits are also in the game lands and pheasants are stocked there.

== History and recreation ==
There are 0.9 miles (1.4 km) of hiking trails in Pennsylvania State Game Lands #329. They are in the northwestern part of the game lands and connect to a trail with a length of 8 miles (13 km) in the Roaring Creek Tract of Weiser State Forest.

Pennsylvania State Game Lands #329 are open 24 hours per day, year-round. However, they are sometimes difficult to access in the winter. The game lands are mainly accessed via Aristes/Ringtown Road. The game lands are managed mainly for activities related to wildlife and hunting.

Pennsylvania State Game Lands #329 are relatively new. In 2005, the board of the Pennsylvania Game Commission approved a proposal to purchase a 600 acres (240 ha) tract of land adjacent to Pennsylvania State Game Lands #329 in Union Township, Schuylkill County. The tract mainly contains mixed hardwood and was to be purchased from the Municipal Authority of the Borough of Shenandoah for $205,000.

== See also ==
- Pennsylvania State Game Lands Number 13, also in Columbia County
- Pennsylvania State Game Lands Number 55, also in Columbia County
- Pennsylvania State Game Lands Number 58, also in Columbia County
- Pennsylvania State Game Lands Number 106, also located in Schuylkill County
- Pennsylvania State Game Lands Number 110, also located in Schuylkill County
- Pennsylvania State Game Lands Number 226, also in Columbia County
