= Pennsylvania State Game Lands Number 55 =

Park in the United States

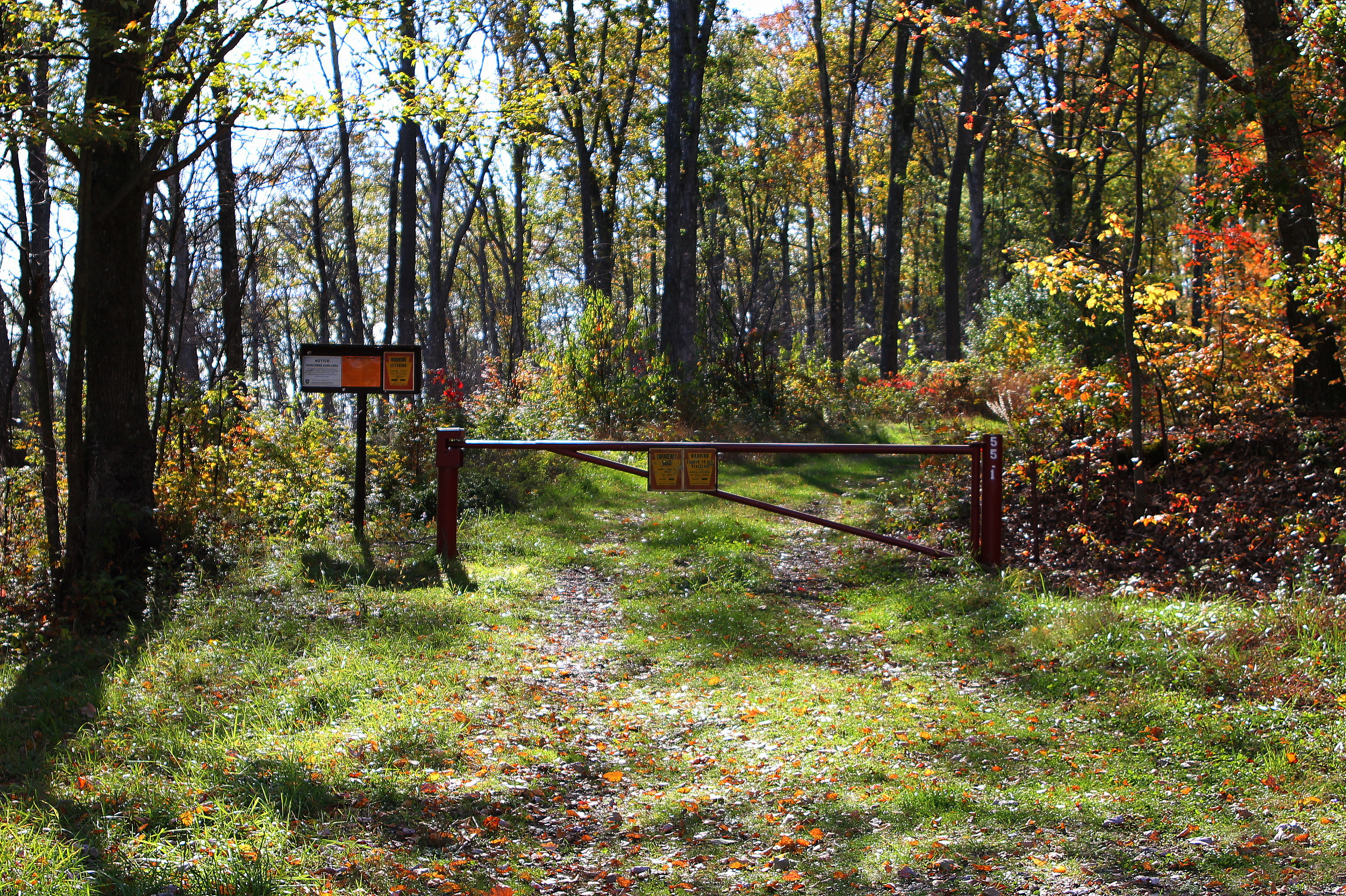
- Entrance to Pennsylvania State Game Lands Number 55 on a grassy trail

- Location within Pennsylvania
- Location: east-central Columbia County, Pennsylvania
- Nearest city: Jonestown
- Coordinates: 41°6′29″N 76°19′0″W
- Area: 2,474 acres (1,001 ha)
- Designation: Pennsylvania State Game Lands
- Owner: Pennsylvania Game Commission

Pennsylvania State Game Lands Number 55 are Pennsylvania State Game Lands in Columbia County, Pennsylvania, in the United States. They have an area of 2,474 acres (1,001 ha). A number of ridges, such as Knob Mountain, Huntington Mountain, and Lee Mountain, are within their boundaries, as are streams such as Briar Creek and Little Shickshinny Creek. The main game animals there include deer, grouse, squirrel, and turkey. Numerous bird species also inhabit these game lands.

== Geography ==
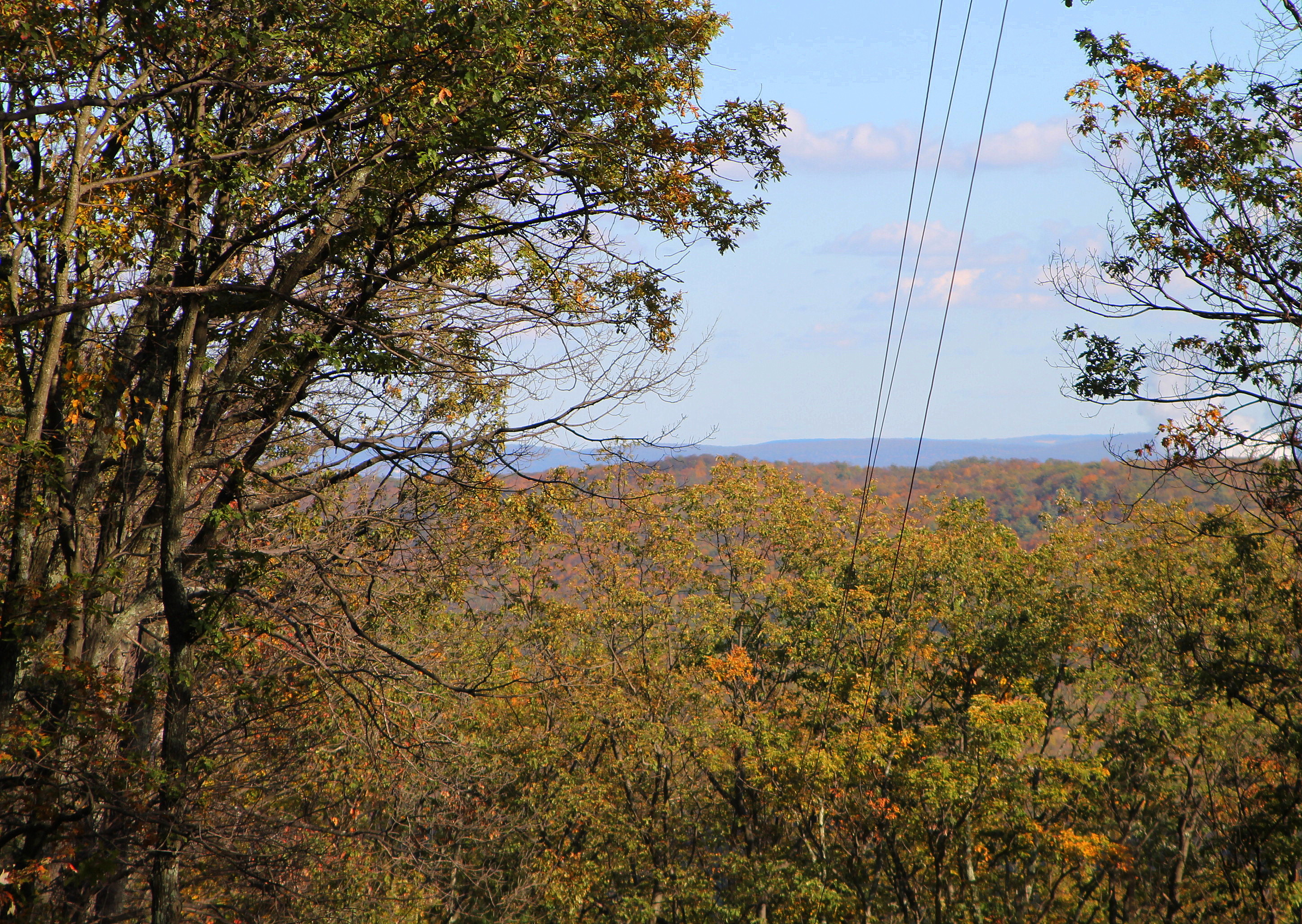
Vista in Pennsylvania State Game Lands Number 55 from the trail

Pennsylvania State Game Lands Number 55 have an area of 2,474 acres (1,001 ha), making them the fourth-largest state game lands in Columbia County. However, according to the Game and Fish Mag, its "topography makes it seem like much more". The game lands are located near Jonestown and are located some distance to the north of Pennsylvania Route 93. They are situated in the east-central part of Columbia County, in Briar Creek Township, Fishing Creek Township, and North Centre Township. They have predominantly mountainous terrain. Part of the watershed of Briar Creek is in the game lands. The game lands, along with Knob Mountain, comprise most of the forested land in the drainage basin of Briar Creek.

Mountains in Pennsylvania State Game Lands Number 55 include Knob Mountain, Huntington Mountain, and Lee Mountain. Many of the ridges in the game lands are at elevations of at least 1,500 to 1,600 feet (460 to 490 m) above sea level. Huntington Creek is to the north of the game lands and the headwaters of Briar Creek and Little Shickshinny Creek are within their boundaries. Stream bottom land is present in the game lands. There are two food plots in the game lands. The game lands have an elevation of 1,604 feet (489 m) at their official coordinates.

Pennsylvania State Game Lands Number 55, along with Pennsylvania State Game Lands Number 260, are in the vicinity of the Bell Bend Nuclear Power Plant site. Pennsylvania State Game Lands Number 55 are to the west of the site, within 6.2 miles (10.0 km) of it. The area in the vicinity of the game lands is surrounded by streams and farmland.

== Biology ==
The main game animals in Pennsylvania State Game Lands Number 55 include deer, grouse, squirrel, and wild turkey. However, bears have also been hunted in the game lands.

No golden-winged warblers or blue-winged warblers were observed in Pennsylvania State Game Lands Number 55 between 2011 and 2013. However, 14 species of warblers were there observed in May 1997. These warblers included the magnolia warbler, the yellow-rumped warbler, the Blackburnian warbler, the black-throated blue warbler, the black-throated green warbler, the hooded warbler, the cerulean warbler, and several others. Dark-eyed juncos also inhabit the game lands.

Hickory and oak forests occur on the ridges in Pennsylvania State Game Lands Number 55. Mountain laurel and various deciduous plants also inhabit the area. Some of the trees there have shelterwood cuttings and the game lands have been selectively timbered. Thick hemlock forests occur in bottom lands near Pennsylvania State Game Lands Number 55. The game lands are part of a forested ridgeline that runs as far as the Pocono Mountains.

In 2001, there were plans to create herbaceous openings within the boundaries of Pennsylvania State Game Lands Number 55. As of 2000, one Special Areas Project has been carried out by the Pennsylvania Society for Ornithology in the game lands. The game lands function as a wildlife bank and thus provide "current and future environmental conditions preferred by many species of birds and plants". Riparian buffers connect Briar Creek and East Branch Briar Creek to forests in the game lands and on Lee Mountain.

== Recreation ==
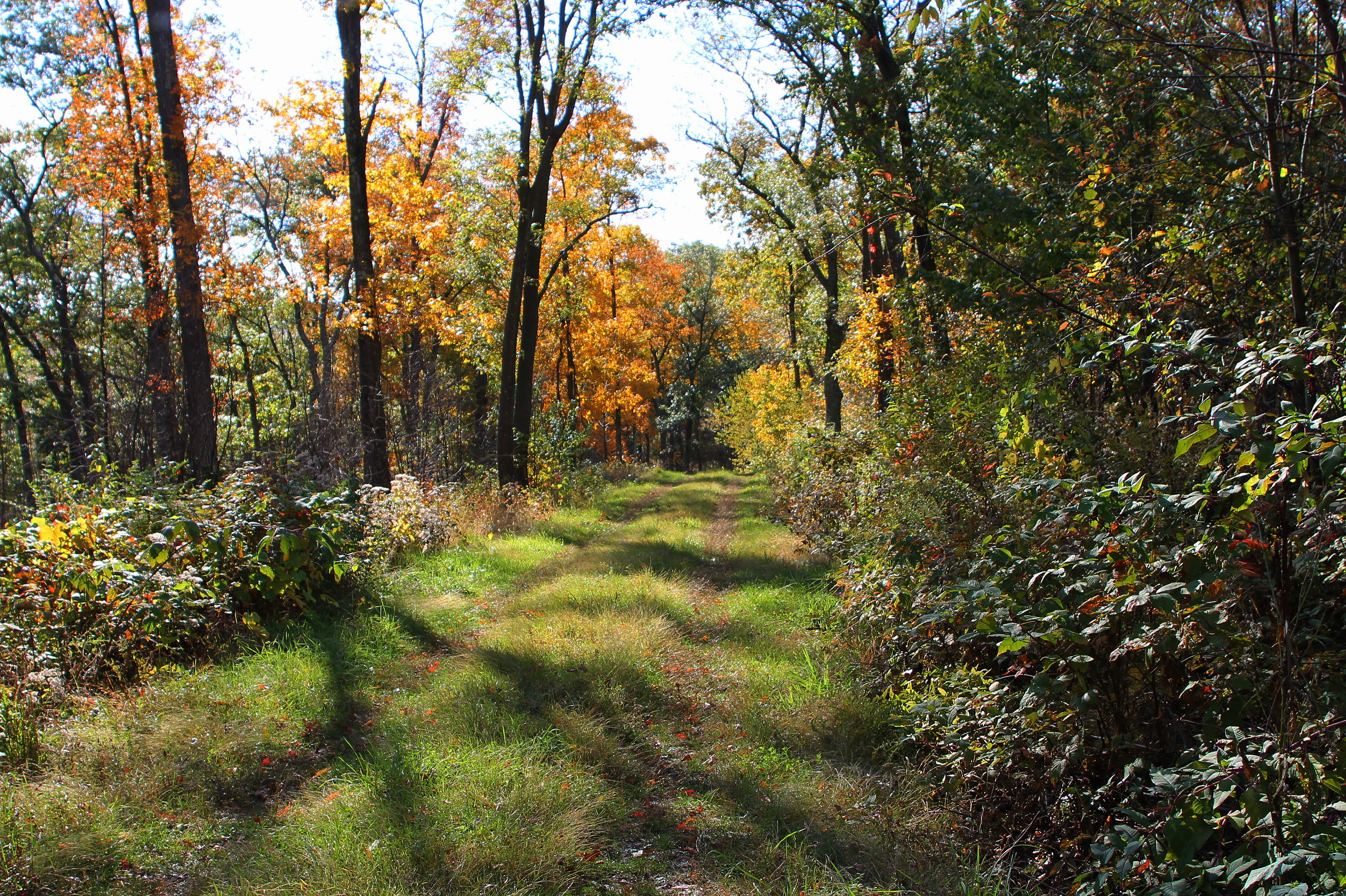
Trail on the top of Huntington Mountain in Pennsylvania State Game Lands Number 55

Camp Louise is located on the border of Pennsylvania State Game Lands Number 55.

Pennsylvania State Game Lands Number 55 are mainly accessed via State Route 1025. However, they can also be accessed via Pennsylvania Route 487 and State Route 1020.

== See also ==
- Pennsylvania State Game Lands Number 13, also in Columbia County
- Pennsylvania State Game Lands Number 58, also in Columbia County
- Pennsylvania State Game Lands Number 226, also in Columbia County
- Pennsylvania State Game Lands Number 329, also in Columbia County
