= Pennsylvania State Game Lands Number 13 =

Park in the United States

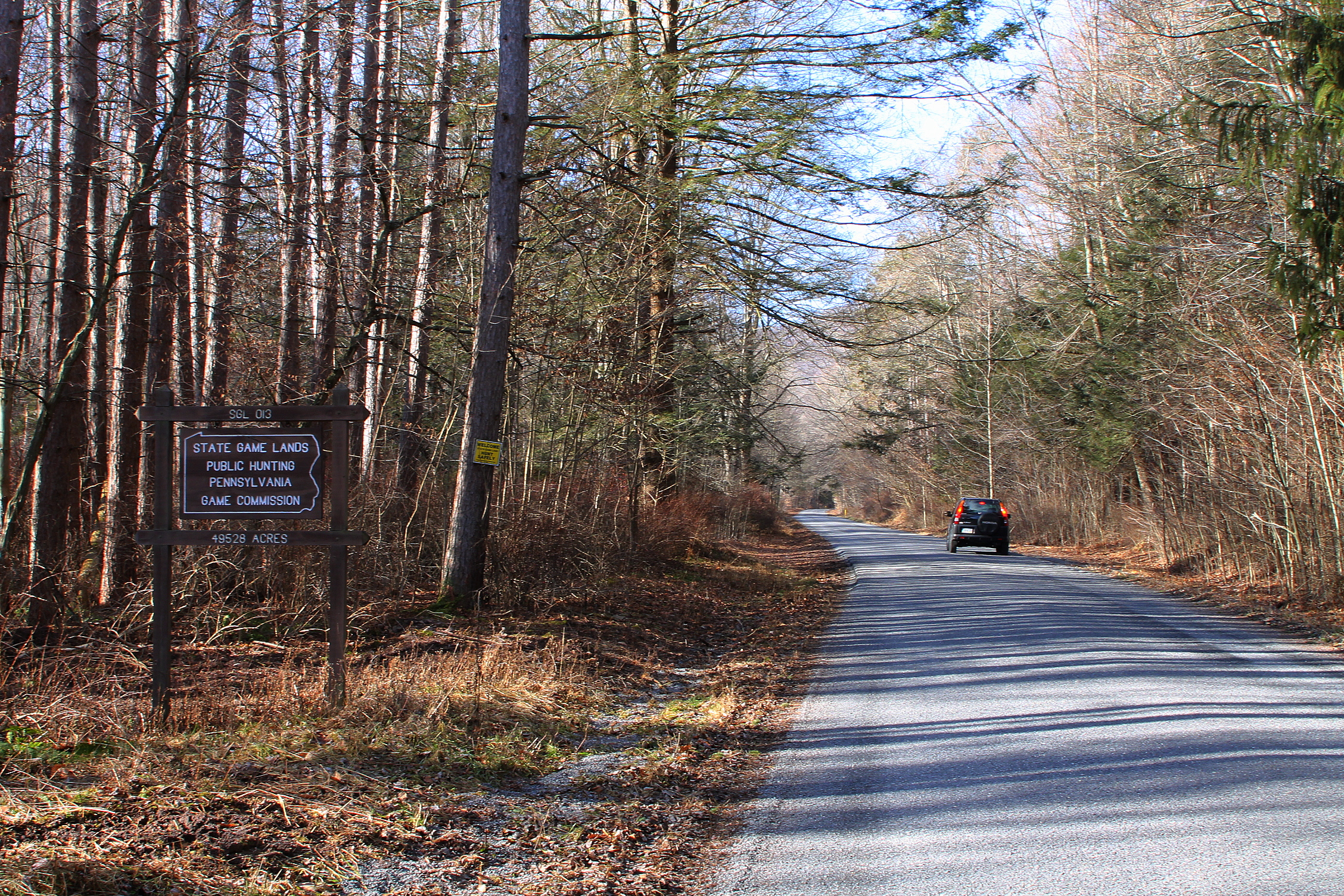

- Location within Pennsylvania Location within the United States
- Location: Columbia County, Pennsylvania and Sullivan County, Pennsylvania
- Nearest city: Sonestown
- Coordinates: 41°22′0″N 76°22′30″W
- Area: 49,529 acres (20,044 ha)
- Elevation: 2,201 feet (671 m)
- Max. elevation: 2,595 feet (791 m)
- Min. elevation: 1,060 feet (320 m)
- Designation: Pennsylvania State Game Lands
- Created: after 1930
- Owner: Pennsylvania Game Commission

Pennsylvania State Game Lands Number 13 are Pennsylvania State Game Lands in Columbia County and Sullivan County, in Pennsylvania, in the United States. They have an area of 49,529 acres. The game lands are mountainous and contain streams such as West Branch Fishing Creek and its tributaries. The main game animals in the area include bear, deer, grouse, turkey, and waterfowl. The game lands are adjacent to Pennsylvania State Game Lands Number 57.

== Geography ==
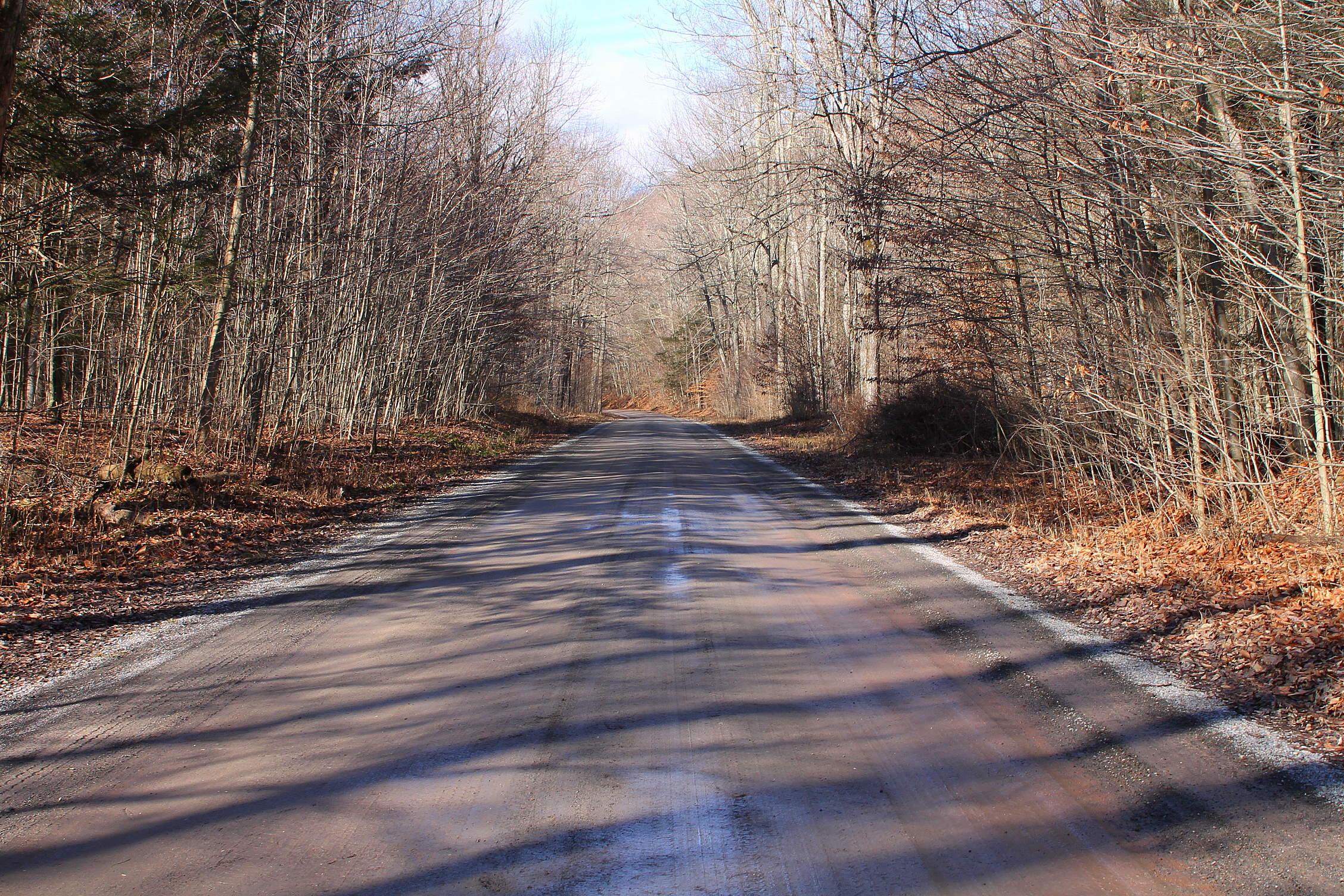
A road in Pennsylvania State Game Lands Number 13

Pennsylvania State Game Lands Number 13 consists of a single parcel located at 41°23′0″N 76°22′30″W and have an area of 49,529 acres. It and the adjacent Pennsylvania State Game Lands Number 57 together comprise an area of nearly 100,000 acres in four counties, making them the largest tract of continuous state game lands in Pennsylvania. State Game Lands Number 13 is itself the largest single state game land in Pennsylvania. The game lands are located near Sonestown. They are located mostly in Sullivan County, but a small area is in Columbia County. The game lands are in the Endless Mountains.

Pennsylvania State Game Lands Number 13 are mostly forested and mountainous, though there are a number of food plots. Several impoundments are located also within its boundaries. North Mountain, Huckleberry Mountain, and Roundtop are in the game lands and the highest mountains are over 2,200 feet (670 m) above sea level. The game land's northern reaches are somewhat flatter than its southern reaches, with rolling hills instead of mountains. West Branch Fishing Creek and many of its tributaries also flow through it, as are some tributaries of Little Fishing Creek. There are several minor roads passing through the game lands. Numerous old forest roads and grades are in the area.

In the western part of Pennsylvania State Game Lands Number 13, West Branch Fishing Creek cuts a gorge between a plateau and the Allegheny Front. Numerous wetlands, such as ponds and swamps are on the top of the plateau. In the eastern section of the game lands, streams such as Heberly Run and Sullivan Branch have created rugged and steep glens with many waterfalls. There are more than 20 waterfalls in the game lands.

Nearby recreational and protected areas include, Pennsylvania State Game Lands Number 142, Pennsylvania State Game Lands Number 172 and Pennsylvania State Game Lands Number 250 to the north, Pennsylvania State Game Lands Number 66 to the northeast, Pennsylvania State Game Lands Number 57 and Ricketts Glen State Park to the east, Pennsylvania State Game Lands Number 206, Pennsylvania State Game Lands Number 224, Pennsylvania State Game Lands Number 260, Moon Lake County Park and PP&L Susquehanna Riverlands Wetland to the southeast, Pennsylvania State Game Lands Number 55 to the south, Pennsylvania State Game Lands Number 226, Pennsylvania State Game Lands Number 325 and Montour Environmental Preserve to the southwest, Pennsylvania State Game Lands Number 134 and Worlds End State Park to the west, and Pennsylvania State Game Lands Number 12 and Pennsylvania State Game Lands Number 36 to the northwest.

Pennsylvania Route 487 passes near a part of Pennsylvania State Game Lands Number 13.

== Statistics ==
SGL 13 was entered into the Geographic Names Information System on 2 August 1979 as identification number 1199594 and is located at 41°22′0″N 76°22′30″W consisting of a single parcel of 49,528.72 acres (20,043.56 ha). Elevations range from 1,060 feet (320 m) to 2,595 feet (791 m). SGL 13 is located at 41°22′0″N 76°22′30″W

== Biology ==
Common game animals in Pennsylvania State Game Lands Number 13 include bear, deer, grouse, wild turkey, and waterfowl. Large numbers of deer inhabit the area.

== History and recreation ==
There are 31.3 miles (50.4 km) of hiking trails in Pennsylvania State Game Lands Number 13. 7 miles (11 km) of designated routes in the game lands are on Fishing Creek Road and head to a fire tower. 5 miles (8.0 km) are on Lee Road, 6 miles (9.7 km) are on Cherry Ridge Road, 6 miles (9.7 km) are on Grassy Hollow Road, and 7.3 miles (11.7 km) are on Glass Creek/Masonite Road.

Pennsylvania State Game Lands Number 13 are less of a popular hiking destination than the nearby Ricketts Glen State Park.

Bicycling, horseback riding, and snowmobiling can also be done in Pennsylvania State Game Lands Number 13.

A large logging town was historically on the border of what is now Pennsylvania State Game Lands Number 13. The game lands were planned as early as 1930. An infrared deer survey was planned in 2006. Twenty nest boxes were set up in the area in July 2008.

== See also ==
- Pennsylvania State Game Lands
- Pennsylvania State Game Lands Number 12 (also located in Sullivan County)
