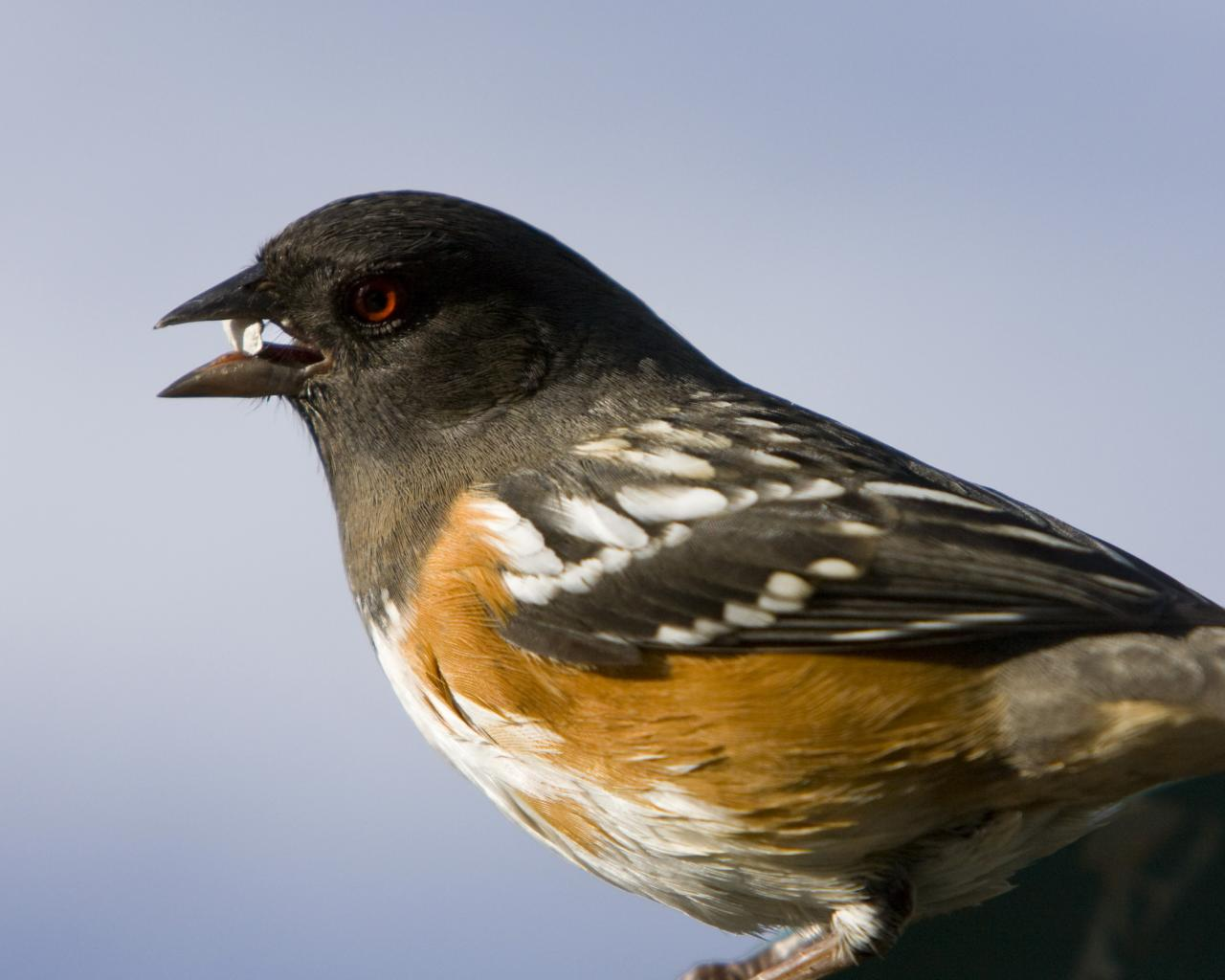
- Spotted towhee (Pipilo maculatus)

Scientific classification
- Kingdom: Animalia
- Phylum: Chordata
- Class: Aves
- Order: Passeriformes
- Family: Passerellidae
- Genus: Pipilo; Vieillot, 1816

Type species
- Fringilla erythrophthalma Linnaeus, 1758

Species
- 4, see text

= Pipilo =

Genus of birds

Pipilo is a genus of birds in the American sparrow family Passerellidae. It is one of two genera containing birds with the common name towhee.

== Taxonomy ==
The genus Pipilo was introduced by the French ornithologist Louis Pierre Vieillot in 1816 with the eastern towhee as the type species. The name Pipilo is Neo-Latin for "bunting" from pipilare "to chirp". Within the New World sparrow family Passerellidae, the genus Pipilo is sister to the larger genus Atlapetes.

== Species ==
The genus contains the following five species, four extant and one extinct:

Image	Scientific name	Common name	Distribution
	Pipilo chlorurus	Green-tailed towhee	interior Western United States, with a winter range in Mexico and the southern edge of the Southwestern United States
	Pipilo ocai	Collared towhee	Mexico
	Pipilo erythrophthalmus	Eastern towhee	eastern North America
	Pipilo maculatus	Spotted towhee	across western North America
	†Pipilo naufragus	†Bermuda towhee	Bermuda; extinct
