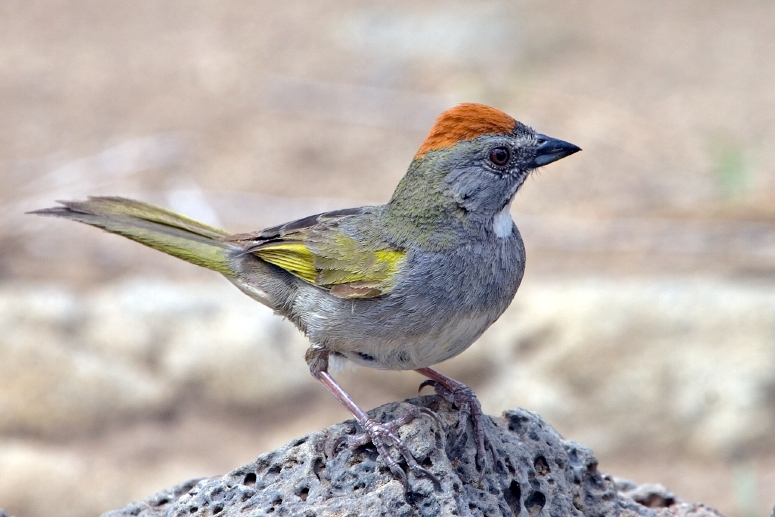

Conservation status
- Least Concern (IUCN 3.1)

Scientific classification
- Kingdom: Animalia
- Phylum: Chordata
- Class: Aves
- Order: Passeriformes
- Family: Passerellidae
- Genus: Pipilo
- Species: P. chlorurus

Binomial name
- Pipilo chlorurus (Audubon, 1839)

Synonyms
- See text

= Green-tailed towhee =

Species of bird

The green-tailed towhee (Pipilo chlorurus) is a species of bird in the family Passerellidae, the New World sparrows. It is found in the western United States and much of Mexico.

== Taxonomy and systematics ==
The formal description of the green-tailed towhee is credited to Audubon, although the bird's description was written by John Townsend in a letter to him. Audubon gave this bird the binomial Fringilla chlorura and the English name "green-tailed sparrow". Because the species' wing shape and some other characteristics are somewhat distinctive, various authors placed it genera Oreospiza, Chlorura, or Oberholseria before it settled into its current Pipilo.

The genus (Pipilo) of the green-tailed towhee is monotypic.

== Description ==
The green-tailed towhee is about 18 cm (7.1 in) long and weighs on average about 29 g (1.0 oz). Though the sexes have essentially the same plumage, females tend to be slightly duller than males. Adults have a reddish brown crown, a white spot above the lores, and a white "moustache" and throat on an otherwise gray head. Their hindneck, back, and scapulars are yellowish olive with grayish olive edges on the feathers. Their rump and uppertail coverts are grayish olive. Their tail is mostly greenish to yellow-green with olive brown edges on most feathers. Their wings are light fuscous with yellow-green edges on most flight feathers. Their breast and belly are grayish white, their sides and flanks pale gray with a creamy buff tinge, and their crissum creamy buff. Juveniles are comparatively drab with brownish gray upperparts and white underparts, both of which are heavily streaked with black.

== Distribution and habitat ==
The green-tailed towhee has a large contiguous breeding range in the western U. S. and a few small populations outside it. It breeds from southeastern Washington, southern and southeastern Idaho, and southwestern Montana south through eastern Oregon and eastern California approximately to Kern County, in all but southernmost Nevada, in all of Utah, in all but northeastern Wyoming, in the western two-thirds of Colorado, most of the northern half of Arizona, and most of the northwestern half of New Mexico. There are isolated breeding areas in northwestern Oregon, north-central Montana, and the area where northeastern Wyoming and western South Dakota meet. It is found year-round in coastal southern California, in a band across central Arizona into west-central New Mexico, and in northern Baja California. It migrates through eastern Colorado, eastern New Mexico, and northwestern Texas. It winters coastally in California from approximately the San Francisco Bay area south and south from a line approximately across southern Nevada, central Arizona, central New Mexico, and central Texas south through Mexico to a line approximately from Jalisco to northern Oaxaca and in the east somewhat inland from central Tamaulipas to Oaxaca. Individuals have wandered as far north as northern Manitoba and east to Nova Scotia in Canada; in the U. S. wanderers have reached most of the east coast states. There are also records in Cuba.

In its breeding range the green-tailed towhee's habitat varies with elevation. In lower areas it inhabits shrub-steppe, a grassland with sagebrush, other brushy plants, and scattered trees. It also inhabits brushy areas regrowing after disturbance such as fire. At higher elevations it inhabits somewhat open woodlands of pine and other conifers, oak and other deciduous trees, and a brushy understory. Here also it often in found in post-fire landscapes. In migration it frequents similar brushy landscapes and includes riparian woodlands. In its non-breeding range it inhabits some similar semi-open landscapes, many of which include Acacia, mesquite, and oak-juniper woodlands. In elevation during the course of the year one source says it occurs from sea level to 2,500 m (8,200 ft). Another says it reaches 3,700 m (12,100 ft).

== Behavior ==
=== Movement ===
The green-tailed towhee is a complete migrant or nearly so; its breeding and non-breeding ranges are detailed above. It vacates its breeding range beginning as early as July and returns to its northernmost parts by May. There are small zones of overlap between the breeding and non-breeding ranges where the species is present year-round. These are apparently not residents but the pattern is believed to be due to northern breeders wintering there and being replaced by breeders arriving from further south. Males tend to return to breeding areas before females.

=== Feeding ===
The green-tailed towhee feeds on a wide variety of seeds and insects and includes smaller amounts of small fruits in its diet. It forages primarily on the ground, usually in dense vegetation, kicking backwards with both feet during a forward hop. It also simply picks food from the ground without the kick. In human-inhabited areas it visits feeders, especially during winter. During the breeding season it forages in pairs and in the non-breeding season is sometimes in small flocks of sparrows.

=== Breeding ===
The green-tailed towhee breeds between early May and early August with pair formation typically occurring within about a week of females' arrival. The species is believed to sometimes raise two broods in a season but direct evidence is lacking. The female builds the nest, a large deep cup with thick walls made from twigs, grass, and bark lined with finer plant fibers and hair. It is placed on the ground under a dense shrub or in a shrub typically within 1 m (3 ft) of the ground. Clutches range from two to five eggs but most are of three or four. The egg is pale sky blue or turquoise with reddish brown speckles. The female alone incubates, for 11 to 13 days. Fledging occurs 11 to 14 days after hatch; females alone brood nestlings but both parents provision them.

=== Vocalization ===
One description of the green-tailed towhee's song is a "very high varied tjip drip threeeeh witwitwit- ending in a fast rattle". Another calls it a "series of clear, whistled notes, preceded by a rather drawn-out weet-chur and ending with a raspy trill". The species also makes a "catlike ascending meeoow. It usually is in dense cover, and one author writes, "A catlike mewing call in the bushes may reveal the presence of the Green-tailed Towhee". Other calls include an "emphatic tick", a "poitt", a "thin, high-pitched tseeeeee", a series of rapid "tuck notes", and "skee-skee-skee and tst-tst-tst".

== Status ==
The IUCN has assessed the green-tailed towhee as being of Least Concern. It has an extremely large range and its estimated population of 4.8 million mature individuals is believed to be stable. The only identified threat is "ecosystem stresses" resulting from climate change. It is considered fairly common throughout its breeding range. "Destruction of large areas of sagebrush and reseeding with grasses for cattle probably had substantial negative impact on Green-tailed Towhees."
