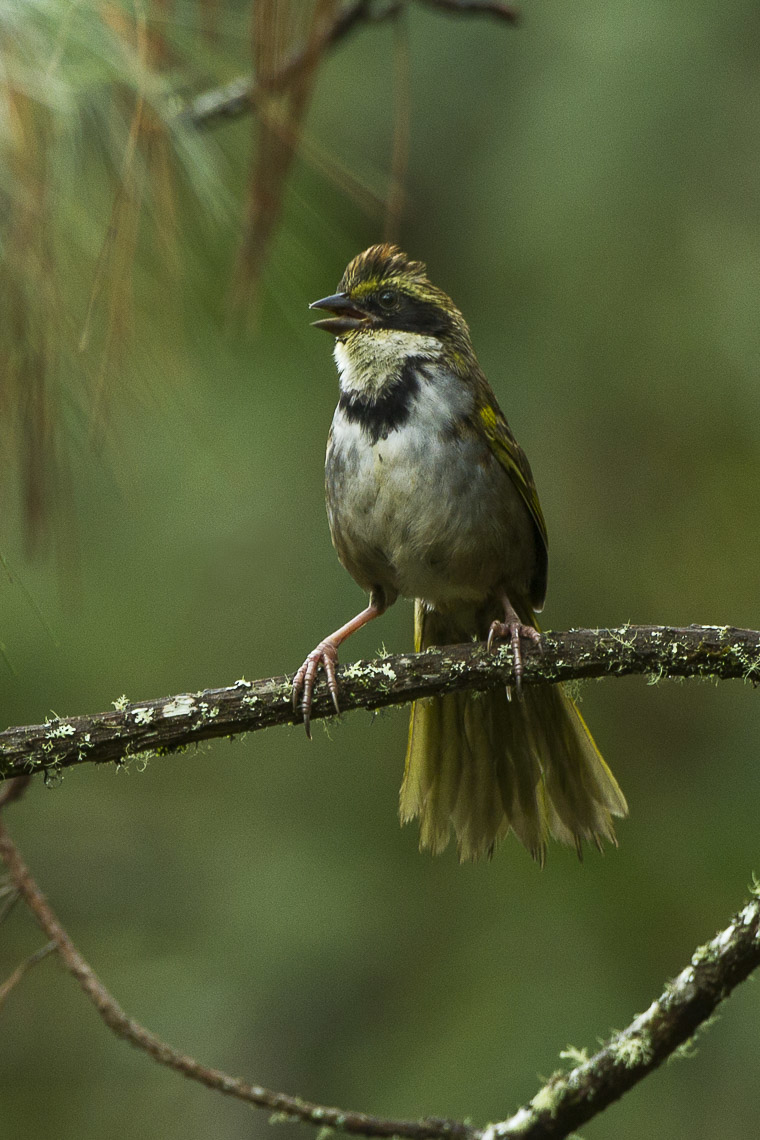

Conservation status
- Least Concern (IUCN 3.1)

Scientific classification
- Kingdom: Animalia
- Phylum: Chordata
- Class: Aves
- Order: Passeriformes
- Family: Passerellidae
- Genus: Pipilo
- Species: P. ocai

Binomial name
- Pipilo ocai (Lawrence, 1865)

= Collared towhee =

Species of bird

The collared towhee (Pipilo ocai) is a species of bird in the family Passerellidae, the New World sparrows. It is endemic to Mexico.

== Taxonomy and systematics ==
The collared towhee was formally described in 1865 with the binomial Buarremon ocai. It was eventually reassigned to its present Pipilo, a genus that had been erected in 1816.

The collared towhee has these five subspecies:

- P. o. alticola (Salvin & Godman, 1889)
- P. o. nigrescens (Salvin & Godman, 1889)
- P. o. guerrerensis Van Rossem, 1938
- P. o. brunnescens Van Rossem, 1938
- P. o. ocai (Lawrence, 1865)

== Description ==
The collared towhee is 19.5 to 23 cm (7.7 to 9.1 in) long. It is the heaviest member of its family though some other towhees are longer; males weigh 61 to 68 g (2.2 to 2.4 oz) and females 54.5 to 62.5 g (1.9 to 2.2 oz). Its wing chord is 7.9 to 9.2 cm (3.1 to 3.6 in), its relatively short tail is 8.9 to 10.6 cm (3.5 to 4.2 in), the bill is 1.5 to 1.8 cm (0.59 to 0.71 in), and the tarsus is 2.8 to 3.4 cm (1.1 to 1.3 in).

The sexes have the same plumage. Adults of the nominate subspecies P. o. ocai have a black forehead with a white line in its middle, a rufous crown, a long white supercilium that reaches the side of the nape, and black lores and ear coverts. Their nape, the sides of their neck, their upperparts, and their tail are olive-green. Their wings are olive-green with bright yellow at the bend. Their throat and lower cheeks are white with a black band across the chest below the throat; it is widest in its center. Their breast is gray, their flanks and undertail coverts brownish, and the center of their belly a paler brownish. They have a reddish brown iris, a black bill, and pale horn-colored to pinkish horn legs and feet. Juveniles have a blackish face with a yellow supercilium and a brown crown and upperparts with darker streaks. They have a yellowish throat and underparts with a dark brown streaks forming a "necklace" and dusky streaks on the belly, and dusky cinnamon flanks and undertail coverts. Their iris is brown.

The other subspecies differ from the nominate and each other thus:

- P. o. alticola: no white in forecrown, very thin supercilium, and wider black chest band than nominate
- P. o. nigrescens: very black face with no forecrown white and no supercilium; rusty tinge on flanks
- P. o. guerrerensis: thin black chest band and pale brownish undertail coverts
- P. o. brunnescens: similar to guerrerensis but with grayer flanks

== Distribution and habitat ==
The collared towhee has an extremely disjunct distribution with four ranges in southern Mexico; only those of P. o. alticola and P. o. nigrescens are contiguous or nearly so. The subspecies are found thus:

- P. o. alticola: western Jalisco and extreme northeastern Colima states in the west
- P. o. nigrescens: north-central Michoacán in the southwest
- P. o. guerrerensis: Sierra Madre del Sur in Guerrero in the southwest
- P. o. brunnescens: central Oaxaca in the south
- P. o. ocai: eastern Puebla and west-central Veracruz in the east-central

The collared towhee inhabits the edges of pine-oak and montane evergreen forest and also scrublands in the subtropical and temperate zones. Sources differ slightly on its elevational range. One says it is 1,500 to 3,750 m (4,900 to 12,300 ft) and another 1,500 to 3,500 m (4,900 to 11,500 ft).

== Behavior ==
=== Movement ===
The collared towhee is a sedentary year-round resident.

=== Feeding ===
The collared towhee's diet has not been studied but is thought to be mostly insects and other arthropods, seeds, and fruits. It forages singly, in pairs, or in family groups. It forages on the ground, where it scratches in leaf litter, and not far above the ground in vegetation.

=== Breeding ===
The collared towhee's breeding season has not been fully defined. It is known to span March through July in Michoacán and include September in Guerrero. Its nest is a cup made from twigs, dry grass, and pine needles lined with softer plant fibers and hair. It typically is placed in a dense shrub not far above the ground. The usual clutch is four eggs that are pale bluish with dark markings. The incubation period, time to fledging, and details of parental care are not known.

=== Vocalization ===
The collared towhee's song is variable; examples are "clee-o-weet-ship-trrr", "wheer-tseet-tseet-trrr, treee-chit-chit-chit", and "chree-tsit-tsit-trrr". It makes zhree and jor-ee calls.

== Status ==
The IUCN has assessed the collared towhee as being of Least Concern. It has a large range; its estimated population of at least 50,000 mature individuals is believed to be decreasing. No immediate threats have been identified. It is considered "often common or very common in appropriate habitat".
