= Pennsylvania State Game Lands Number 36 =

Park in the United States

- Location within Pennsylvania Location within the United States
- Location: Bradford County
- Coordinates: 41°38′0″N 76°35′6″W; 41°36′39″N 76°34′35″W; 41°38′27″N 76°30′19″W
- Area: 18,870 acres (7,640 ha)
- Elevation: 1,762 feet (537 m)
- Max. elevation: 2,300 feet (700 m)
- Min. elevation: 840 feet (260 m)
- Owner: Pennsylvania Game Commission

The Pennsylvania State Game Lands Number 36 are Pennsylvania State Game Lands in Bradford County in Pennsylvania in the United States providing hunting, bird watching, and other activities.

== Geography ==
State Game Lands Number 36 is in Franklin and Monroe Townships in Bradford County. A portion of the eastern parcel of the Game Lands is on Kellogg Mountain (summit elevation 2,132 feet (650 m)). The Game Lands shares a border with Pennsylvania State Game Lands Number 12 to the west.

== Statistics ==
SGL 36 was entered into the Geographic Names Information System on 1 March 1990 as identification number 1208052, elevation is listed as 1,762 feet (537 m).
