= Food plot =

Area acting as a food source for wildlife

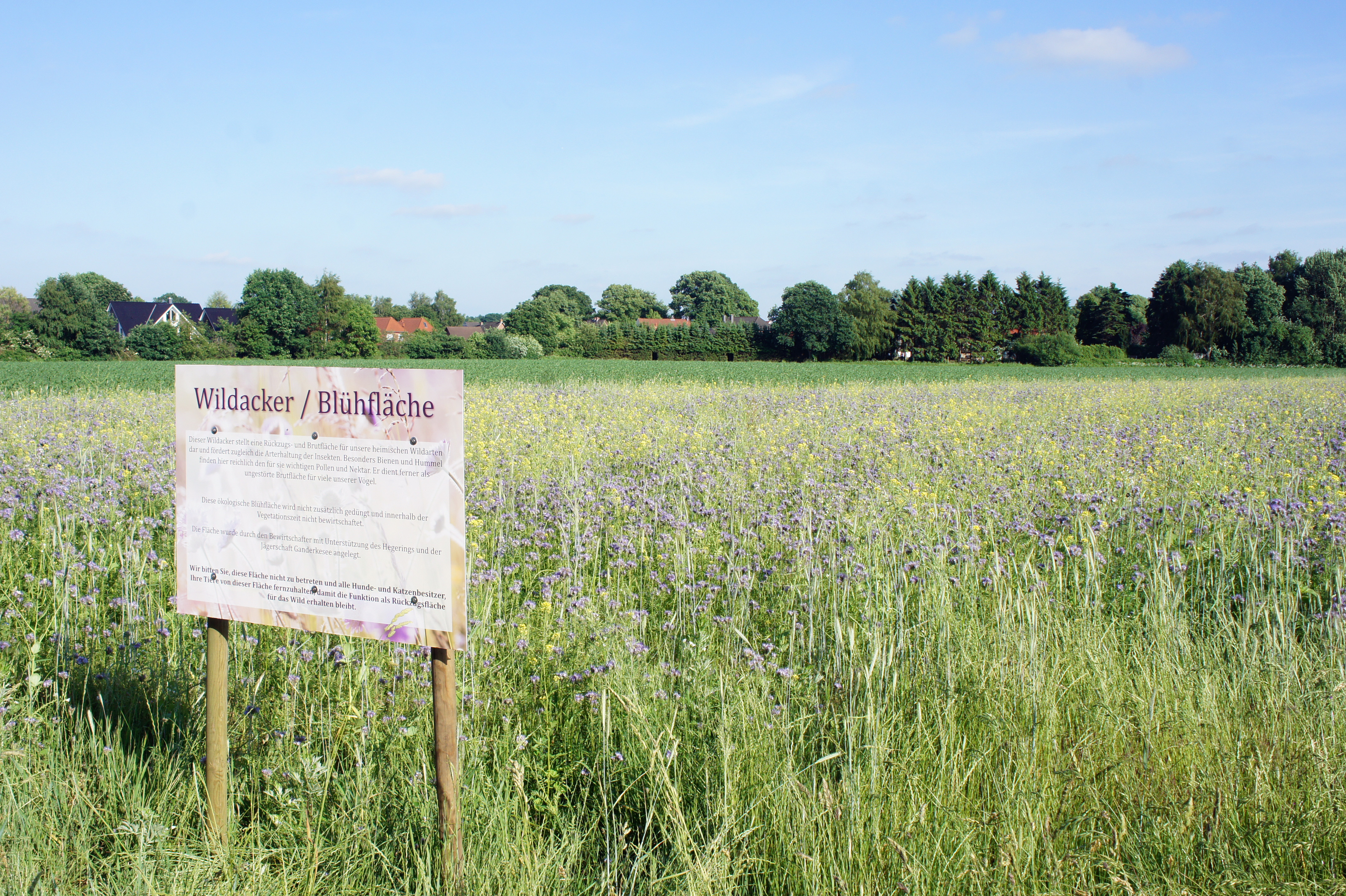
Food plot in Germany

A food plot is a planted area set aside to act as a supplementary food source for wildlife. The term was coined by the United States hunting and outdoor industries. Food plots are most commonly planted for game species.

Food plot crops generally consist of legumes (clovers, alfalfa, beans, etc.), grains, or certain wildflowers. The plants may be annual or perennial and specific recommendations for local varieties that perform best in your area for specific wildlife species are often available. In agricultural areas, food plots may be planted in fields after the crop has been harvested, and left standing through the fall, winter, and early spring for the use of wildlife.

In some cases farmers and landowners may be reimbursed by the government for providing food plots that meet government specifications. A food plot should be located close to a source of cover for animals and should only be one part of a comprehensive habitat management program. Ideally a food plot should be small (2 to 4 acres), irregularly shaped, and located away from roads. A variety of cool-season grasses and forbs can be used to attract and enhance nutrition of multiple game species simultaneously when mixed according to recommendations.

Food plots differ from revegetation, which is intended to stabilize and rebuild the soil of disturbed land using naturally growing grasses, legumes, shrubs, and trees. Food plots are intended to feed wildlife rather than rebuild the soil, and generally use agricultural forages rather than native or naturally occurring plants. The oldest company to start developing products for food plots is the Whitetail Institute of North America in 1988.

Food plots can greatly increase the wildlife carrying capacity of a particular ecosystem, enhancing opportunities for hunting or wildlife viewing. Target animals include whitetail deer, bear, moose, rabbit, woodchuck, deer, wild turkey, grouse, and songbirds.

In 2001 the United States Fish and Wildlife Service announced that 8.7 million people across the country maintained some sort of planting for the sole benefit of wildlife. This group of people spent $699 million on these plantings.
