= Bruce Mansfield Power Plant =

Defunct coal power plant in Pennsylvania, US

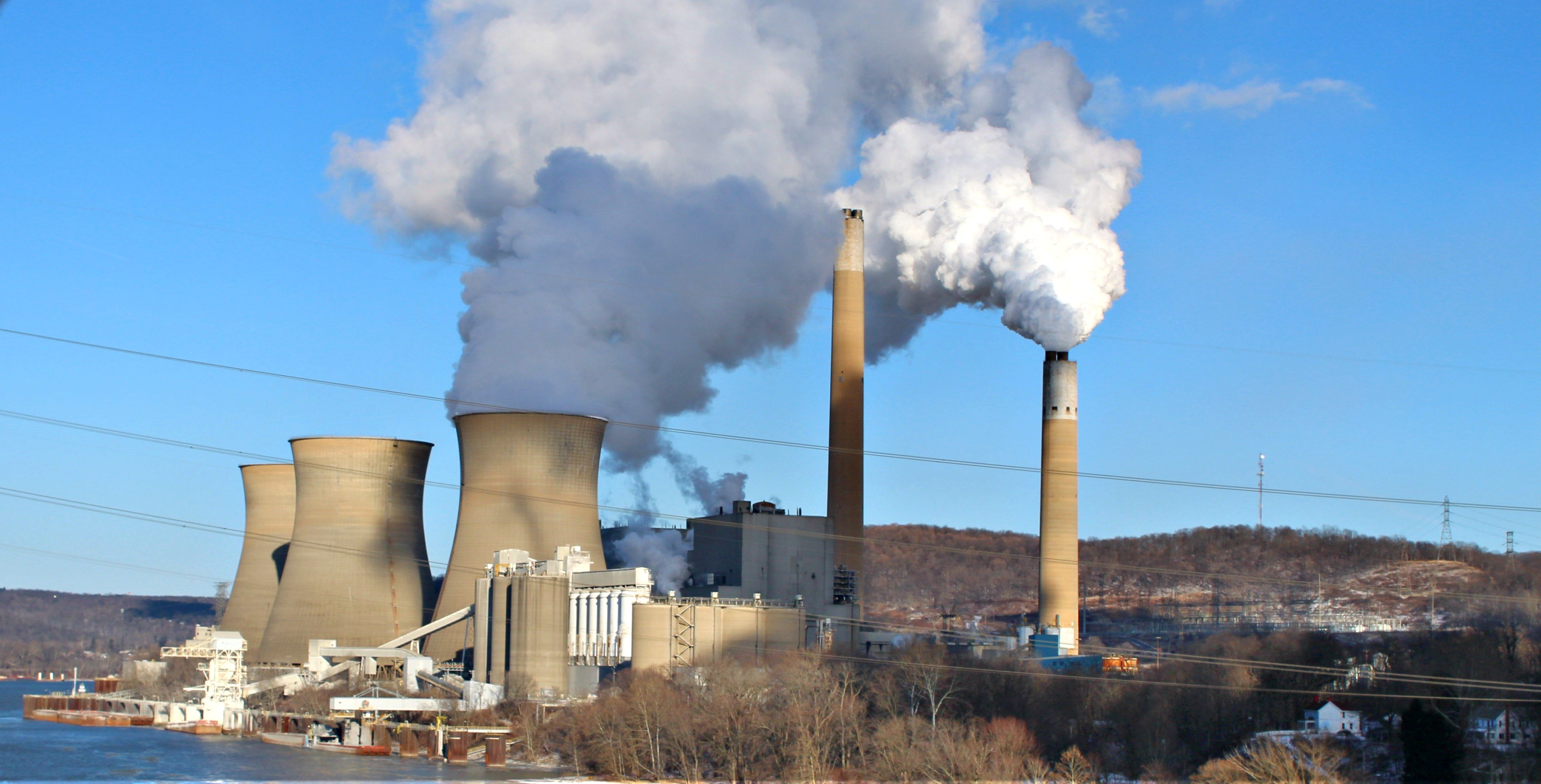
- Bruce Mansfield Power Plant from the Shippingport Bridge in 2019
- Country: United States
- Location: Shippingport, Pennsylvania
- Coordinates: 40°38′04″N 80°25′01″W
- Status: Shutdown
- Commission date: Unit 1: 1976; Unit 2: 1977; Unit 3: 1980
- Decommission date: Units 1–2: February 5, 2019; Unit 3: November 7, 2019
- Owner: FirstEnergy
- Operator: FirstEnergy

Thermal power station
- Primary fuel: Coal
- Cooling source: Ohio River

Power generation
- Nameplate capacity: 2,490 MW

External links
- Commons: Related media on Commons

Bruce Mansfield Power Plant was a 2.49-gigawatt (2,490 MW), coal power plant located in Shippingport, Pennsylvania in Beaver County, Pennsylvania. The plant was operated by FirstEnergy. It began operations in 1976 and was shut down in November 2019.

== History ==
Construction of Bruce Mansfield commenced in 1970. The plant was operated by Pennsylvania Power (a subsidiary of Ohio Edison). Its ownership was a consortium of Pennsylvania Power, Ohio Edison, Cleveland Electric Illuminating, Toledo Edison, and Duquesne Light to form the Central Area Power Coordination (CAPCO). Bruce Mansfield began commercial operations of Unit 1 in 1976 with Units 2 and 3 following suit in 1977 and 1980 respectively. All three of the units generated 830 MW each with a nameplate capacity of 2490 MW. The plant was named after D. Bruce Mansfield, a former chairman of Pennsylvania Power. Murray Energy was the primary supplier of coal for Bruce Mansfield. The coal was shipped from West Virginia.

FirstEnergy Solutions announced in August 2018 that they were closing Bruce Mansfield by June 2021. FirstEnergy Solutions blamed the wholesale market system, which PJM Interconnection operates on, for not relying on coal and nuclear plants. PJM Interconnection conducted an analysis and concluded the plant's closure would not affect grid reliability. The closure was moved back to November 2019 due to, "a lack of economic viability."

== Environmental mitigation ==
Units 1 and 2 were installed with a flue-gas desulfurization (FGD) system to prevent sulfur dioxide (SO_{2}) from being emitted into the atmosphere. Its chimney is 950 feet (290 m) tall. The sludge was then transported 7 miles (11 km) by pipe to Little Blue Run Lake between Beaver County, Pennsylvania and Hancock County, West Virginia. When Unit 3 was constructed in 1980, an electrostatic precipitator (ESP) system, designed by the Weir Group, was installed instead for the unit to curb particulate emissions. Its chimney is 600 feet (180 m) tall. To reduce waste disposal from scrubbers at Bruce Mansfield, National Gypsum constructed a nearby plant in 1998 to process synthetic gypsum from the plant to produce drywall. To deliver the gypsum for the nearby manufacturer, a forced-oxidation gypsum (FOG) system was built. A $200 million dewatering facility was completed in 2016 in response to a 2012 settlement that prohibits the further disposal of byproduct at Little Blue Run Lake. The facility would separate byproduct from water and then be properly disposed of in a lined impoundment at Murray Energy's mine in Marshall County, West Virginia. The dewatering facility began operations in January 2017, but problems at the new facility forced the plant to go offline the following month. The plant restarted two weeks later.

== Incidents ==
A release of hydrogen sulfide (H_{2}S) during repair work on a pipe killed two and injured four workers in August 2017. The workers' families who experienced casualties in the accident filed lawsuits against FirstEnergy in November 2017 seeking damages. Occupational Safety and Health Administration (OSHA) fined FirstEnergy $77,605 for workplace hazards and also fined subcontractor Enerfab $129,340 for failing to provide "appropriate respiratory protection". FirstEnergy ultimately settled by paying a fine of $65,963.

On January 10, 2018, Bruce Mansfield caught on fire causing damage to its roof and duct work. In a filing later that month, FirstEnergy revealed that the fire caused significant damage to the equipment for Units 1 and 2. The damage was severe enough that deactivation of both units were accelerated from June 2021 to February 5, 2019.

== See also ==
- List of largest power stations in the United States
- List of power stations in Pennsylvania
