= PCCS =

PCCS may refer to:

- Pennsylvania Cyber Charter School, a public virtual charter school based out of Midland, Pennsylvania, USA
- Prairie Creek Community School, a K-5 charter school in Castle Rock Township, Minnesota, USA
- Pocatello Community Charter School, a public K-8 charter school in Pocatello, Idaho, USA
- Practical Color Coordinate System, a color model developed by the Japan Color Research Institute
- Pearson correlation coefficients, a measure of linear correlation in mathematics
- Plymouth Canton Community Schools, a public K-12 school system, Michigan, USA
