= Little Blue Run Lake =

Artificial lake in Pennsylvania and West Virginia, United States

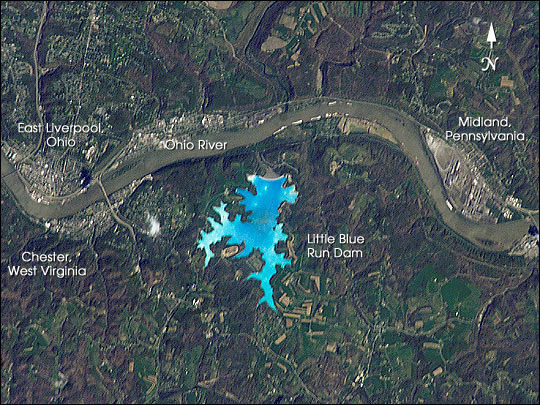
- NASA image of Little Blue Run from 2002

- Location within Pennsylvania
- Location: Pennsylvania, West Virginia
- Coordinates: 40°37′32″N 80°30′47″W
- Lake type: artificial lake
- Basin countries: United States

Little Blue Run Lake or Little Blue Run is the largest coal ash impound in the United States. Ohio-based FirstEnergy owns the site, located in Western Pennsylvania and parts of the Northern Panhandle of West Virginia, and has disposed of billions of gallons of coal waste into the body of water. Several court cases have been brought against the company as a result of the damage caused by the company's practices at the site.

== Description ==
The artificial lake was completed in 1975 and is located in both Beaver County, Pennsylvania and Hancock County, West Virginia and is owned by FirstEnergy, a publicly traded company with assets worth $48 billion in 2010. Before Little Blue Run Lake was created, the power company told local residents that the project would create a local recreational and boating area. The lake covers 1,900 acres (770 ha) and the waste in the lake is prevented from escaping thanks to a 400-foot-tall (120 m), 2,200-foot-wide (670 m) rock-and-earth dam. The dam containing Little Blue Run Lake has been given a designation of "high hazard", meaning, there would be harm or loss of life if the structure were to fail. Some of the natural valleys in the area were filled with a coal ash slurry and held in place by one of the nation's largest high hazard dams. Coal slurry from Bruce Mansfield Power Plant in Shippingport was piped into the lake. This same coal slurry is piped into the lake via a seven-mile long pipeline.

=== Toxic waste and risks ===
The lake contains 20 billion US gallons (7.6×10^{10} litres; 1.7×10^{10} imperial gallons) of coal ash and smokestack scrubber waste. The northern coast of the lake is only a few hundred meters from the Ohio River, which is the drinking water source for more than three million people.

The Pennsylvania Department of Environmental Protection (PADEP) estimates that if the dam failed it would affect 50,000 people and has mandated that coal ash cannot be added to the lake after 2016. In 2015, Vice News reported that dangerous pollutants were leaking from the body of water into the local community.

The Little Blue Run Coal Ash Impoundment is unlined and has over time leaked pollution into the local ground and surface water, which local families rely on for consumption, cooking, and bathing. Some local residents worry for their health because of this pollution. In addition to the water concerns, families living near the site worry about toxic dust and complain of a strong rotten egg smell from hydrogen sulfide (H_{2}S).

== Lawsuits against FirstEnergy ==
Numerous lawsuits regarding Little Blue Run Lake have been filed against FirstEnergy. In one action, a notice of intent to sue letter was filed by The Environmental Integrity Project and Public Justice on May 30, 2012. The notice of Intent alleged that toxic pollution and leaks from the Little Blue Run Impoundment violated State and Federal environmental laws. The leaks from the Impoundment allowed boron, manganese, sulfates, arsenic, and other pollutants to discharge into local water sources. On day 59 of a 60 day notice of intent to sue waiting period, the PADEP filed the first ever state lawsuit for a coal ash disposal site. This state action was taken against FirstEnergy because the Little Blue Run Impoundment caused a potential "imminent and substantial endangerment" to human health and the environment. Simultaneously the PADEP filed its lawsuit and a consent decree in federal court seeking the closure of the Little Blue Run Coal Ash Impoundment. The consent decree "The consent decree requires First Energy to submit a plan to close the plant by the end of 2016. The company will also have to pay a fine of $800,000, supply 21 households with hook-ups to municipal water systems, and conduct an environmental impact study on the area." FirstEnergy is required to clean up the site by 2031, but in April 2014, FirstEnergy agreed to have the site cleaned by 2028. FirstEnergy is required to cover the ash with two layers of impermeable "geotextile" sheeting to keep unhealthy chemicals from entering the local groundwater, it must monitor noise, odors and particulate emissions, conduct quarterly reconnaissance of contaminated water seepage from the lake and take corrective actions when necessary. According to the PADEP, FirstEnergy is also required to monitor the site "for as long as environmental problems remain at the site."

As a result of settling the lawsuit, FirstEnergy began disposing the byproduct (through the process of dewatering) in a lined impoundment at Murray Energy's mine in Marshall County, West Virginia.

Another lawsuit was filed in Federal Court by 15 Beaver County, Pennsylvania residents and 36 West Virginia residents who accused FirstEnergy of contaminating groundwater and leaking hazardous waste, including arsenic, sulfates, sodium, calcium, magnesium and chloride into local waterways and groundwater systems. The dispute with the Pennsylvania residents, a minority of the parties who claim to have been affected, was settled out of court in February 2015. The terms of the settlement were undisclosed.
