= Jersey Central =

Jersey Central can refer to:

Companies of U.S. Mid-Atlantic states:

- Central Railroad of New Jersey
- Jersey Central Power & Light, acquisition of FirstEnergy
