= Shippingport Bridge =

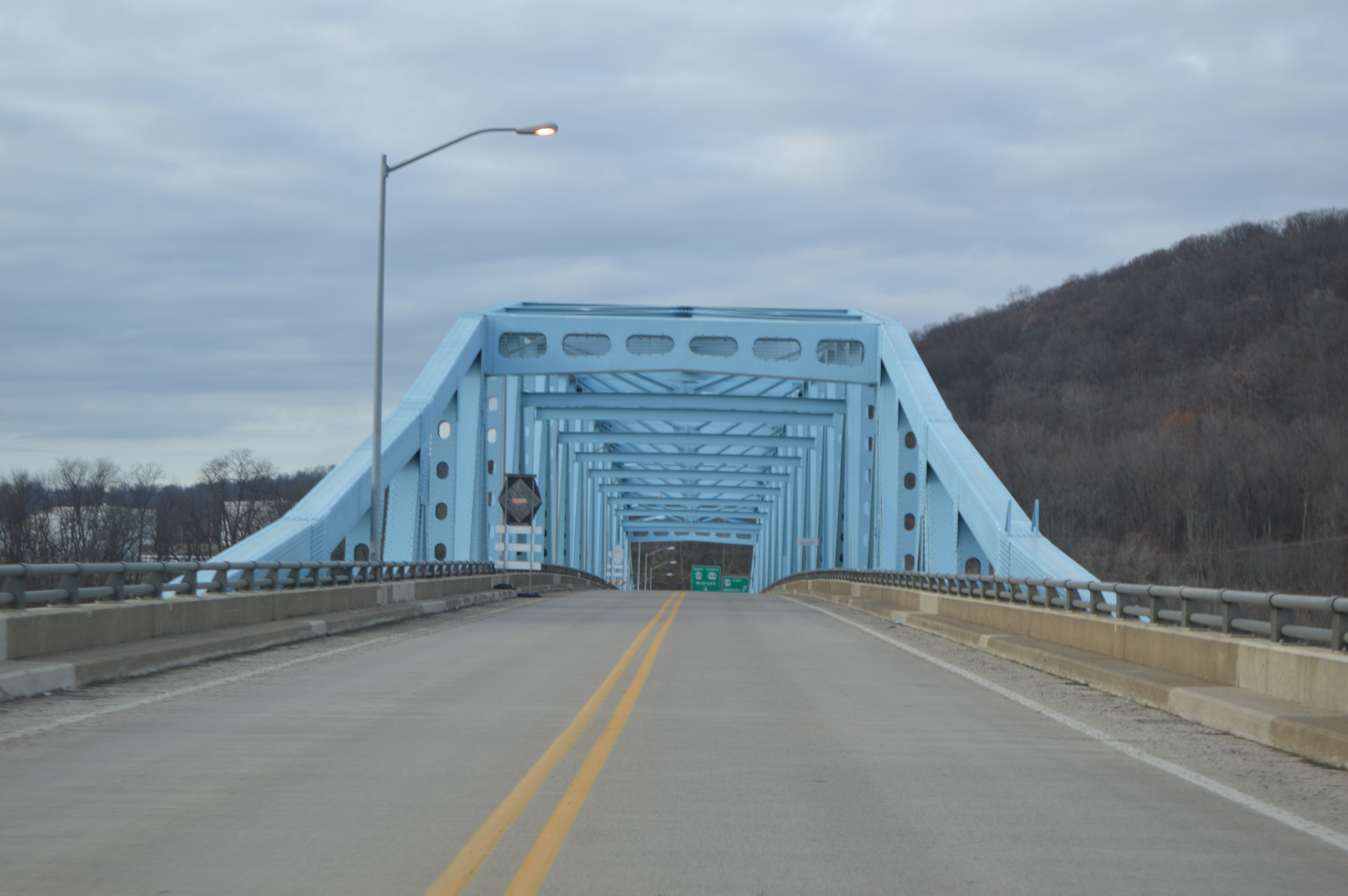
- Looking north from the bridge's southern end
- Coordinates: 40°37′37″N 80°25′56″W
- Carries: 2 lanes of PA 168
- Crosses: Ohio River
- Locale: Shippingport and Midland, Pennsylvania
- Maintained by: PennDOT

Characteristics
- Design: Cantilevered through truss bridge

History
- Opened: 1964

The Shippingport Bridge is a cantilevered, through truss bridge in the U.S. state of Pennsylvania that carries Pennsylvania Route 168 across the Ohio River between the boroughs of Shippingport and Industry.

Built in 1961, the southern approach to this bridge is adjacent to the Beaver Valley Nuclear Power Station.

== History and notable features ==
From 1951 until the opening of this bridge in 1964, PA 168 was accessed across the river via Cooks Ferry.

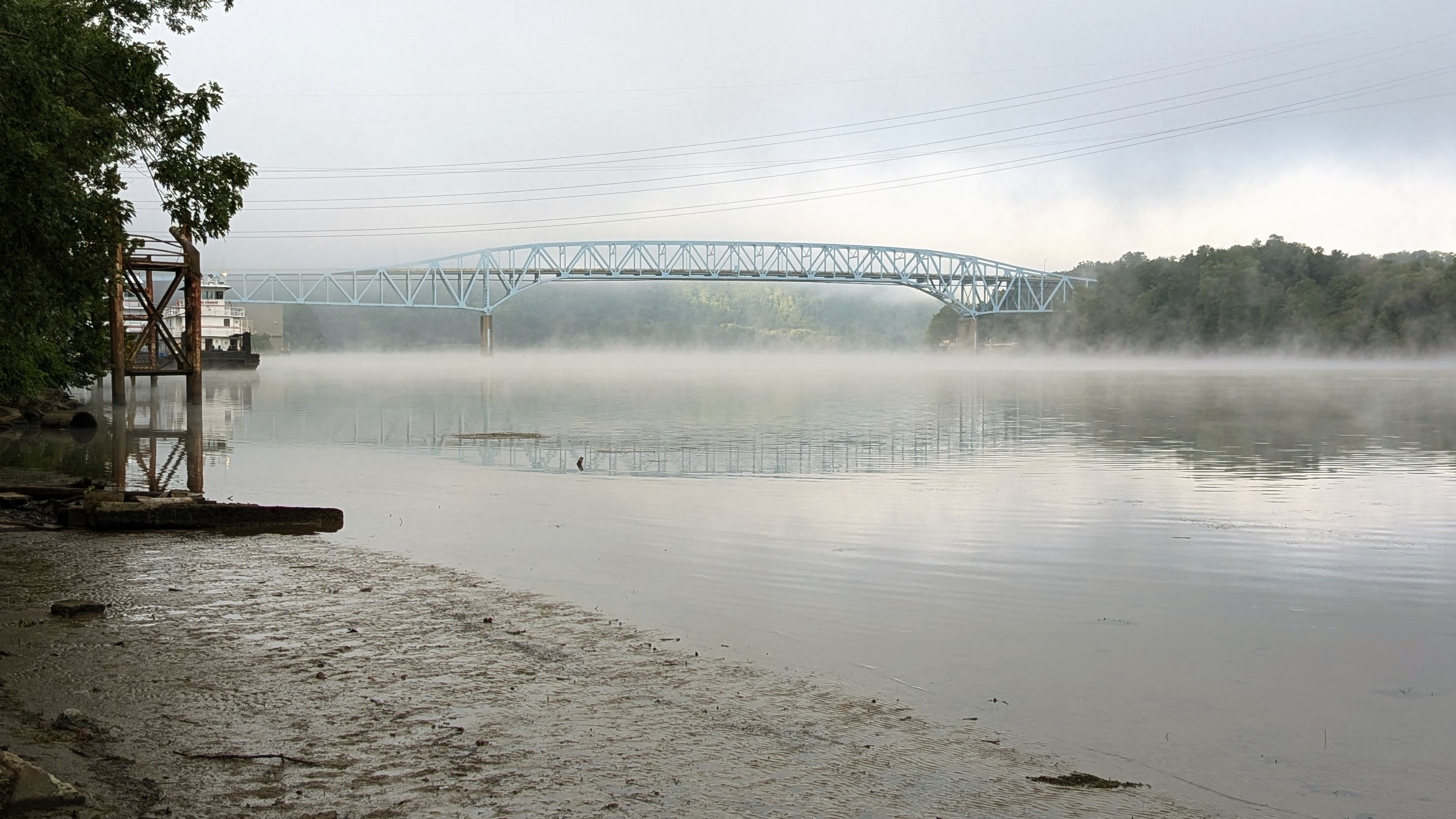
Shippingport Bridge from the south bank of the Ohio River looking west.

On May 14, 1969, the Chester Bridge (1896–1970) between East Liverpool, Ohio and Chester, West Virginia, which had carried U.S. 30 across the Ohio River, was permanently closed. From that day until November 7, 1977, when the Jennings Randolph Bridge was opened to traffic, the Shippingport Bridge carried what was temporarily designated as "Detour U.S. 30." That detour used Ohio State Route 39 through the East End of East Liverpool to reach Pennsylvania State Route 68.

It remained on that route through Midland, Pennsylvania, then used Pennsylvania State Route 168 on the Shippingport Bridge to cross the river. From there, it proceeded southwest along highway 168 through Hookstown, where it then turned and rejoined U.S. 30 about 1.4 miles (2.3 km) south of that hamlet.

== See also ==
- List of crossings of the Ohio River
