= Midland, Pennsylvania =

Borough in Pennsylvania, US

- Borough
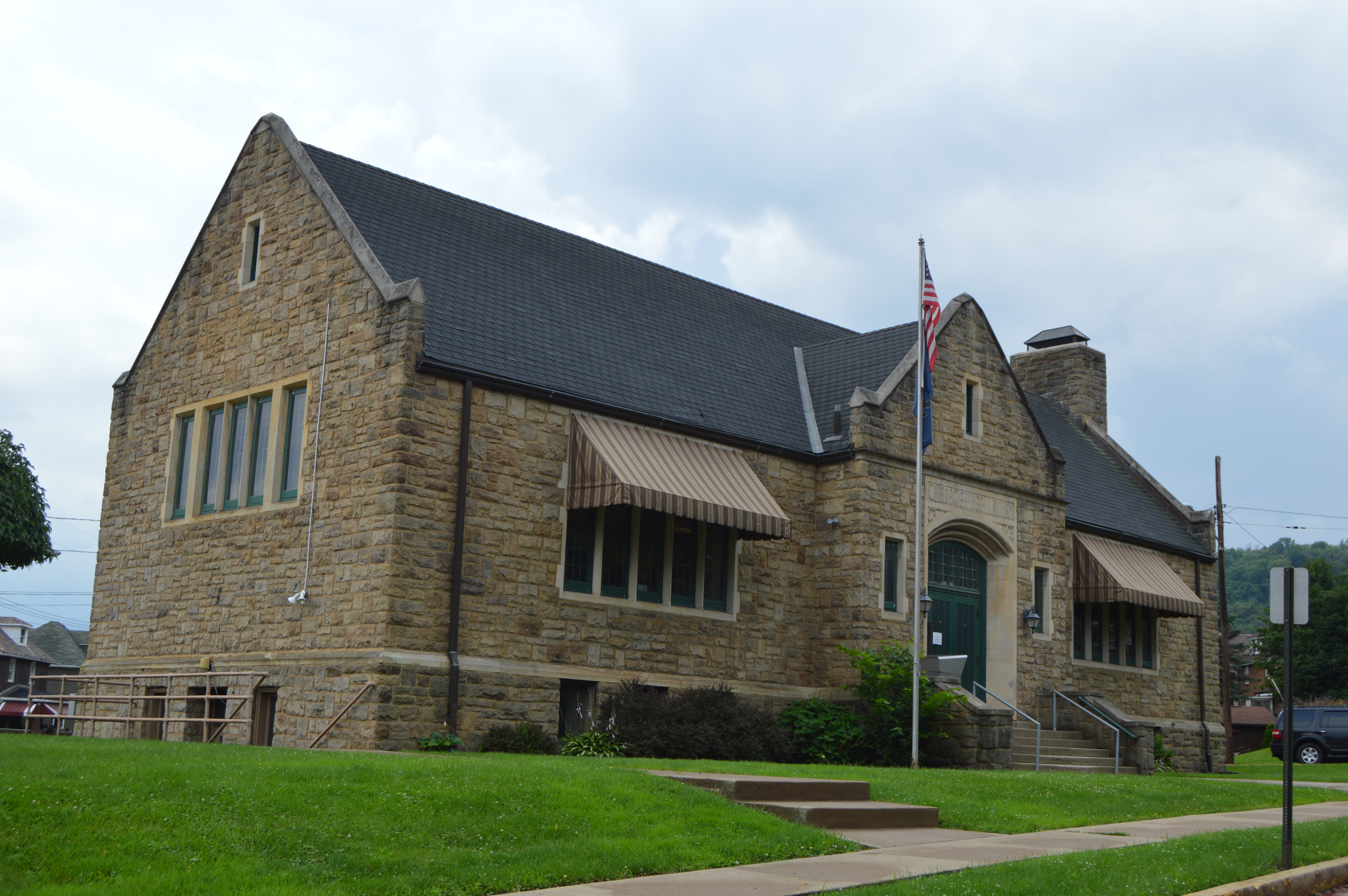
- Carnegie Library
- Interactive map of Midland, Pennsylvania
- Location within Pennsylvania Location within the United States
- Coordinates: 40°38′18″N 80°27′09″W
- Country: United States
- State: Pennsylvania
- County: Beaver
- Incorporated: 1906

Government
  - Type: Borough Council

Area
  - Total: 1.99 sq mi (5.16 km^{2})
  - Land: 1.81 sq mi (4.69 km^{2})
  - Water: 0.18 sq mi (0.47 km^{2})
- Elevation: 797 ft (243 m)

Population (2020)
  - Total: 2,433
  - Density: 1,344.9/sq mi (519.28/km^{2})
- Time zone: UTC-5 (Eastern (EST))
  - Summer (DST): UTC-4 (EDT)
- Zip code: 15059
- Area code: 724
- FIPS code: 42-49184
- Website: https://www.midlandboro.org/

Midland is a borough located along the Ohio River in western Beaver County, Pennsylvania, United States. As of the 2020 census, the population was 2,433. It is part of the Pittsburgh metropolitan area. Founded in 1906, it was initially a company town surrounding the Crucible Steel Company's Midland Works.

== History ==
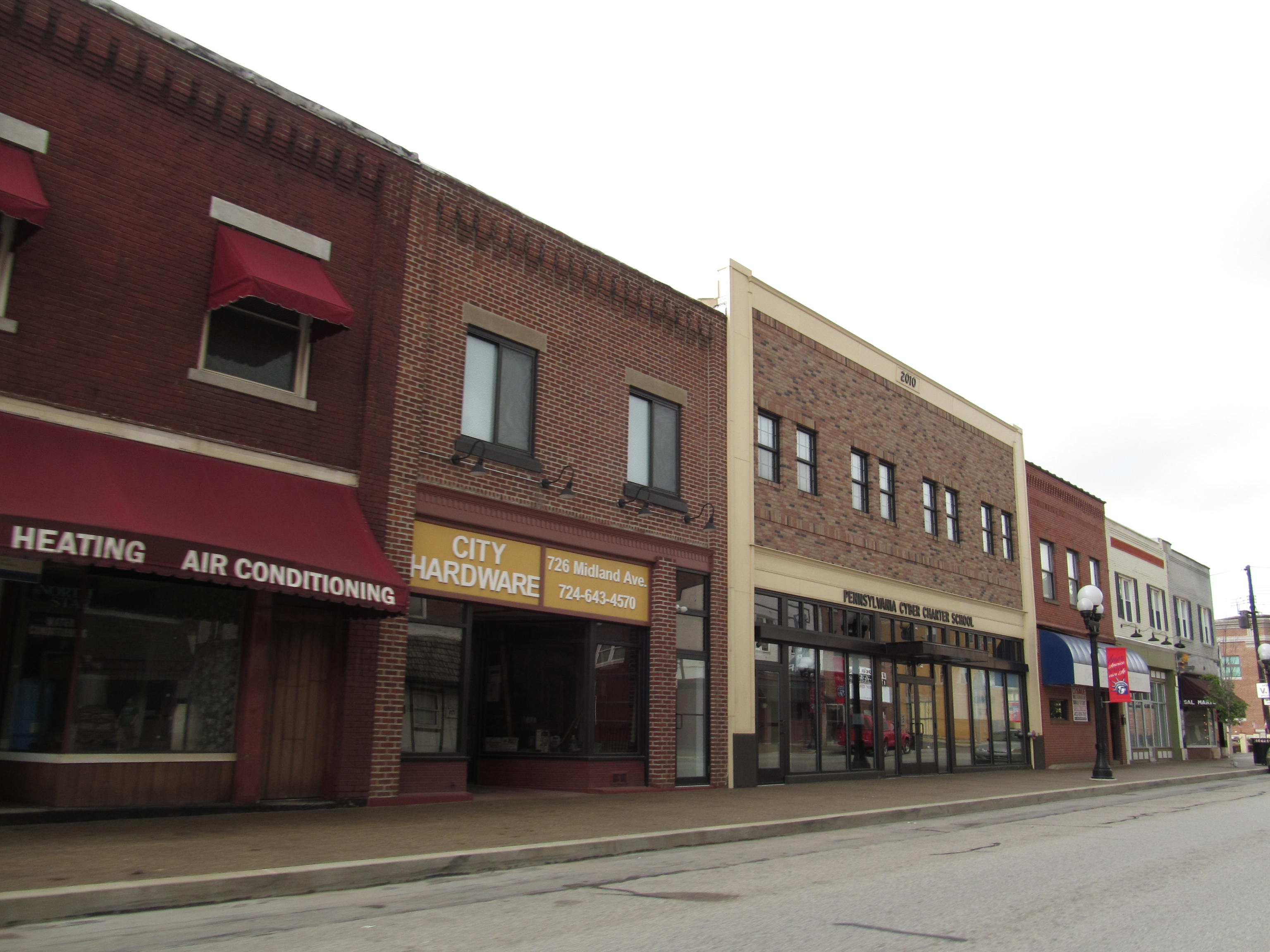
Downtown Midland

Native American petroglyphs exist in the area surrounding Midland, including on Babbs Island, the Little Beaver Creek, and Shippingport Bridge.

In 1905, Pittsburgh agent T. K. Miller purchased land on behalf of a group of industrialists who would form the Midland Steel Company and with it, the borough of Midland as a company town in 1906. Other companies would begin operations in the town as well. In 1911, Midland Steel Company sold its operations to the Pittsburgh Crucible Steel Company, a division of the larger Crucible Steel Company of America. By the end of the First World War, Crucible employed 2,700 men.

The contraction of the American steel industry in the 1960s and 1970s forced layoffs at the Crucible plant and a decline in the borough's population. During the 1980s, the American Iron and Steel Institute reported that more than 200,000 steelworkers in the U.S. had lost their jobs, and more than 400 mills and plant divisions were closing, including Crucible's Midland plant. Jones & Laughlin Steel bought the Midland plant and merged with Republic Steel to form the LTV Steel Corporation, which went bankrupt in 2001, accelerating the decline of the borough's economy.

== Geography ==
Midland is located in western Beaver County at 40°38′18″N 80°27′9″W (40.638273, −80.452455).

According to the United States Census Bureau, the borough has a total area of 2.0 square miles (5.2 km^{2}), of which 1.8 square miles (4.7 km^{2}) is land and 0.19 square miles (0.5 km^{2}), or 9.13%, is water.

Pennsylvania Route 68 (Midland Avenue) is the main street through the community, leading east into Industry and west to Glasgow and the Ohio border. Pennsylvania Route 168 joins PA-68 along Midland Avenue through the center of town but splits off to the south to cross the Ohio River via the Shippingport Bridge, and climbs out of the river valley to the north via Fairview Road.

=== Surrounding and adjacent neighborhoods ===
Midland has two land borders, with Industry to the northeast and Ohioville to the northwest. Across the Ohio River to the southeast, Midland runs mostly adjacent with Greene Township with a short alignment with Shippingport to the southwest.

== Demographics ==
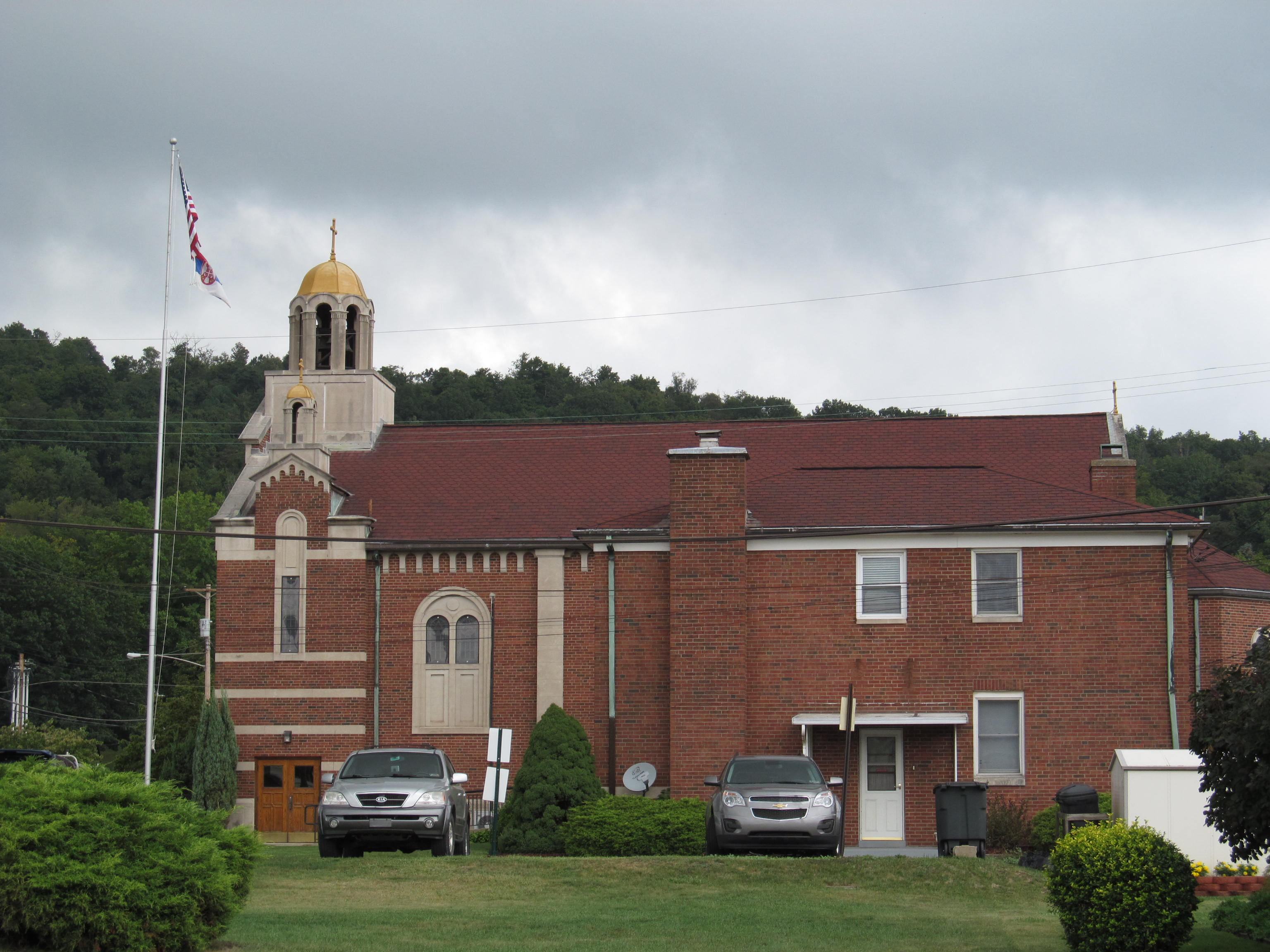
St. George Serbian Orthodox Church

Historical population
Census	Pop.	Note	%±
1910	1,244		—
1920	5,452		338.3%
1930	6,007		10.2%
1940	6,373		6.1%
1950	6,491		1.9%
1960	6,425		−1.0%
1970	5,271		−18.0%
1980	4,310		−18.2%
1990	3,321		−22.9%
2000	3,137		−5.5%
2010	2,635		−16.0%
2020	2,433		−7.7%
2021 (est.)	2,398	▼	−1.4%

As of the 2000 census, there were 3,137 people, 1,424 households, and 817 families residing in the borough. The population density was 1,537.1 inhabitants per square mile (593.5/km^{2}). There were 1,651 housing units at an average density of 809.0 per square mile (312.4/km^{2}). The racial makeup of the borough was 75.71% White, 20.85% African American, 0.45% Native American, 0.89% from other races, and 2.10% from two or more races. Hispanic or Latino of any race were 3.70% of the population.

There were 1,424 households, out of which 24.6% had children under the age of 18 living with them, 34.1% were married couples living together, 18.1% had a female householder with no husband present, and 42.6% were non-families. 38.7% of all households were made up of individuals, and 19.5% had someone living alone who was 65 years of age or older. The average household size was 2.19 and the average family size was 2.91.

In the borough the population was spread out, with 23.2% under the age of 18, 8.2% from 18 to 24, 25.8% from 25 to 44, 19.0% from 45 to 64, and 23.8% who were 65 years of age or older. The median age was 40 years. For every 100 females, there were 82.6 males. For every 100 females aged 18 and over, there were 76.7 males.

The median income for a household in the borough was $23,117, and the median income for a family was $31,887. Males had a median income of $27,261 versus $20,078 for females. The per capita income for the borough was $17,066. About 17.3% of families and 20.3% of the population were below the poverty line, including 39.9% of those under age 18 and 7.7% of those age 65 or over.

== Education ==
Midland is served by the Midland Borough School District. The current schools serving Midland include Midland Elementary/Middle School (grades K–8), Beaver Area High School (grades 9–12, part of the Beaver Area School District), and alternatively, Lincoln Park Performing Arts Charter School (grades 7–12) and Midland Innovation + Technology Charter School (grades 9-12) (although the latter announced a permanent closure in August of 2025.)

Lincoln Park is the only school serving grades 9 through 12 in the borough, despite being a charter school with admissions requirements. Until 1985, Lincoln High School operated within the borough. In 1985, the school board voted to close Lincoln Junior-Senior High School. With only 150 students in grades 7 through 12, they could no longer afford to operate the school. The district made two failed attempts to merge with neighboring Western Beaver County School District, once in 1965, and again in 1985. First, the district entered into a 5-year tuition agreement with the Beaver Area School District from 1985 to 1990. In 1990, an agreement was reached to bus students 8 miles to East Liverpool High School in East Liverpool, Ohio, where they attend 9th through 12th grades and graduate. These were the only Pennsylvania public school students attending a facility in another state. In February 2015, East Liverpool notified the Midland Borough School Board of its intention to end the agreement. High school students once again attend Beaver Area High School.

Pennsylvania Cyber Charter School, an online school, bases its operations out of Midland.

== Notable people ==
- Ellis Cannon, talk show host, television personality and publisher
- John Hardon, Jesuit priest, writer, teacher and theologian
- Simmie Hill, American Basketball Association player
- Ralph Francis Scalera, judge of the United States District Court for the Western District of Pennsylvania
- Norm Van Lier, NBA player and All-Star guard with the Cincinnati Royals, Chicago Bulls, and Milwaukee Bucks
- Robert Zielinski, American football end

== See also ==
- List of cities and towns along the Ohio River
