= MYR Group Inc. =

Renewable energy company

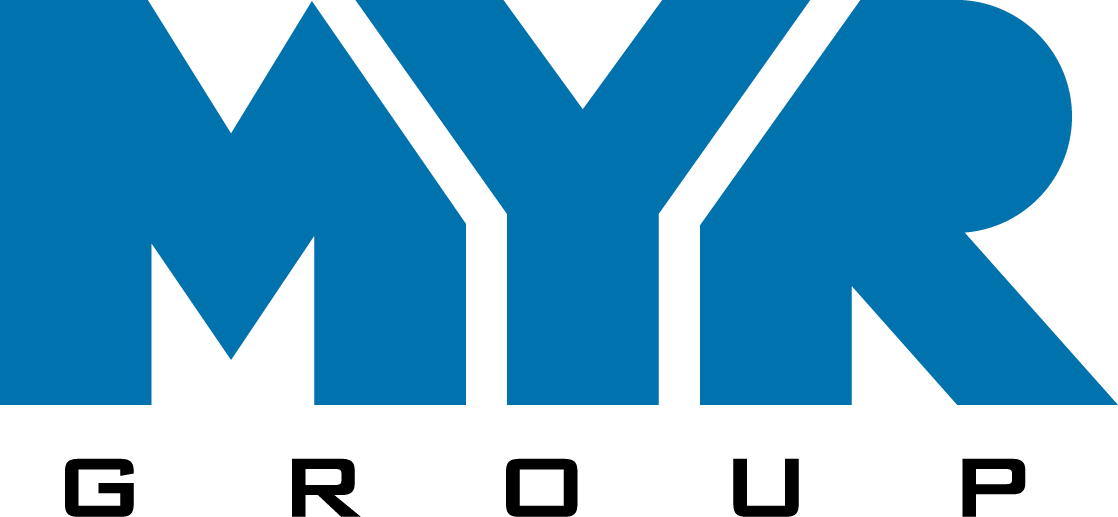
- Type: Public
- Traded as: Nasdaq: MYRG
- Founded: 1995
- Headquarters: Henderson, Colorado
- Revenue: ▲$3.66 billion USD (2025)
- Net income: ▲$91 million USD(2025)
- Number of employees: 9,000
- Website: myrgroup.com

MYR Group Inc. is an American corporation that offers electrical construction services for transmission and distribution lines, substations, commercial and industrial buildings, and renewable energy. It is the parent company to 12 subsidiary electrical construction companies.

It has approximately 8500 employees and in 2022 had revenue of $3.01 billion. It is publicly traded on Nasdaq under the stock symbol MYRG. Its headquarters are in Thornton, Colorado.

== History ==
MYR Group was listed on the New York Stock Exchange from 1996 to 2000, when it was bought by GPU Inc., which was then bought by FirstEnergy Corp. From 2005 to 2007, ArcLight Capital Partners was the majority shareholder. In 2008, approximately 20 million shares in the company were registered with NASDAQ for resale. Trading started at $16 per share; by December the price had fallen to $10. In 2023 the stock reached $150 a share. Currently the biggest shareholders are BlackRock and Vanguard Group.

Richard S. Swartz became president and chief executive officer in January 2017, replacing William A. Koertner who had held those posts since 2003.

== Acquisitions ==
In 2000 the company acquired Great Southwestern Construction, followed by E.S. Boulos and High Country Line Construction in 2015, Western Pacific Enterprises in 2016, Huen Electric in 2018, and Powerline Plus in 2022. MYR Energy Services, Inc. was created in 2009.
