= Ellis Cannon =

American talk show host, television personality and publisher

- Born: March 28, 1959 (age 67)
- Occupations: American talk show host, television personality, and publisher

Ellis G. Cannon is an American talk show host, television personality and publisher.

He was born on March 28, 1959, and was raised in Midland, Pennsylvania. He graduated from Lincoln High School in Midland in 1977. Cannon received his B.A. and J.D. from the University of Pittsburgh in 1981 and 1984, respectively.

Between 1984 and 1996, Cannon was a trial lawyer in the Pittsburgh law firm of Robb, Leonard & Mulvihill, highlighted by a successful representation of the Major League Baseball Players Association. He served as a partner in the law firm from 1990 to 1996.

In 1996, Ellis and his brother, Henry, co-founded the "Pittsburgh Sports Report", a monthly newspaper covering all Western Pennsylvania sports. Cannon remains the publisher of PSR as of April 2010. Since its creation in 2004, Cannon has also been the publisher of "KidSPORTS Magazine, A Parent's Guide for the Young Athlete". He is President of Pittsburgh Sports Report, Inc.

PSR has won 5 Golden Quill Awards, presented by The Press Club of Western Pennsylvania, recognizing excellence in journalism, among over 20 nominations.

Ellis and Henry co-hosted "The Pittsburgh Sports Report with the Cannon Brothers", a sports talk show on Pittsburgh's ESPN Radio 1250 beginning in 1998. In 2001, Ellis became the sole host of "The Pittsburgh Sports Report with Ellis Cannon" on the station and the show quickly became the Pittsburgh market's #1 rated weekend talk show. He also hosted numerous other programs dedicated to the NFL, Pittsburgh Steelers, MLB, Pittsburgh Penguins and professional golf. Cannon also co-hosted national weekend programming for ESPN Radio between 2001 and 2004.

In January 2004, Cannon was hired by WPGB (FM 104.7) of Clear Channel in Pittsburgh to host "Ellis Cannon’s Sportsline Pittsburgh," weeknights from 6 PM EDT to 8 PM EDT, and won multiple Pittsburgh A.I.R. Awards for Achievement in Radio, including "Best Evening Show on a Sports, Talk or Personality Station", "Best Sports Reporter" and "Best Sports Coverage Reporting". "Sportsline" was the only daily sports program in the station's newstalk format and was removed from the air in January 2010 when the station's daily format was changed to all political talk.

Cannon was an on-air member of the Pittsburgh Steelers radio network between 2004 and 2010, serving as gameday anchor and host of all pre-game, halftime and post-game coverage. He was also a member of the on-air broadcast, offering in-game updates and analysis, and covered the Steelers in Super Bowl XL and Super Bowl XLIII. He hosted several Pittsburgh Steelers players shows as well.

From 2007 to 2009, "Ellis Cannon's Sportsline Pittsburgh" was the lead-in program to the Pittsburgh Pirates Radio Network game broadcasts after the Pirates changed flagship stations from KDKA to WPGB, after KDKA served as the flagship from 1955 to 2007.

Cannon produced daily on-air commentaries during his tenure at WPGB, served as a daily sport commentator on the Pittsburgh Steelers flagship station, WDVE-FM (2004–2010), and previously served as a sports anchor for Pittsburgh's Fox Sports Radio 970 (WPGG-AM).

In addition, Cannon has appeared on many national television networks as a sports/sports law analyst, including Fox News Channel, MSNBC and CNN, and on many Pittsburgh television programs on KDKA-TV, Pittsburgh CW, and PCNC.

In April, 2010, Mr. Cannon was inducted into the Beaver County (PA) Sports Hall of Fame in the category of broadcasting.

For the past several years, Cannon has served as color commentator for Duquesne Dukes football, men's and women's basketball broadcasts on SportsNet Pittsburgh and ESPN+.

He also teaches the Ellis Cannon Academy of Sports Media and Broadcasting at the Pennsylvania Cyber Charter School.
