= Western Beaver Junior/Senior High School =

Location
- 224 Engle Road; Industry, Pennsylvania 15052; United States; 40.6691°N 80.4207°W

Information
- Type: Public, Coeducational high school
- School district: Western Beaver County School District
- Superintendent: Robert H. Postupac
- Principal: David M. Brandon
- Teaching staff: 33.10 (FTE)
- Grades: 6-12
- Enrollment: 350
- Student to teacher ratio: 11.03
- Colors: Purple and Gold
- Athletics conference: Western Pennsylvania Interscholastic Athletic League
- Mascot: Golden Beavers
- Team name: Golden Beavers
- Yearbook: Aurora
- Communities served: Industry, Ohioville
- Feeder schools: Fairview Elementary
- Athletic Director: Tyler Hedorn
- Website: www.westernbeaver.org/o/high-school

Western Beaver Junior/Senior High School is a public high school in Industry, Pennsylvania, United States. It is the only high school in the Western Beaver County School District. Athletic teams compete as the Western Beaver Golden Beavers in the Western Pennsylvania Interscholastic Athletic League.
