= Pittsburgh Cable News Channel =

- Type: Digital subchannel
- Country: United States
- Broadcast area: Pittsburgh Media Market

Ownership
- Owner: Cox Media Group
- Sister channels: WPXI

History
- Launched: January 1, 1994; 32 years ago

Availability

Terrestrial
- WPXI 11.4

The Pittsburgh Cable News Channel (PCNC) is a cable news channel and digital subchannel of WPXI serving the Western Pennsylvania area. It is owned by Cox Media Group. PCNC simulcasts or replays much of WPXI's programming. It continues to produce two original talk shows, "Pittsburgh Now" and "Night Talk", along with local news and regional business news.

== History ==
PCNC first started broadcasting on January 1, 1994, created in a partnership between WPXI (Channel 11) and the region's largest cable TV company at the time, TCI. Comcast (Xfinity) stopped carrying PCNC on January 1, 2020, which significantly reduced the potential viewing audience. WPXI added PCNC to its digital subchannel lineup in early March 2023.

From 1996 to 2023, PCNC produced the local prime time talk show "Night Talk", featuring one-on-one interviews of local newsmakers. The show launched with John McIntire as host. After McIntire's departure in 2003, the show had several hosts, including Ann Devlin and its final host, Beaver County sports hall-of-fame broadcaster Ellis Cannon. Other shows aired on the channel included "Pittsburgh Now"; "Our Region's Business", hosted by Bill Flanagan (not to be confused with radio and TV host Bill Flanagan) of the Allegheny Conference; and local newscasts multiple times per day with reporting from WPXI.

Currently, PCNC airs reruns of WPXI newscasts, some syndicated news/talk shows, and Cox Media Group shows such as National News Tonight (produced by WSB-TV) and Justice Rules. PCNC's only current exclusive newscast is at 5:30 p.m. on Saturdays and Sundays.
