= Shippingport, Pennsylvania =

Borough in Pennsylvania, US

- Borough
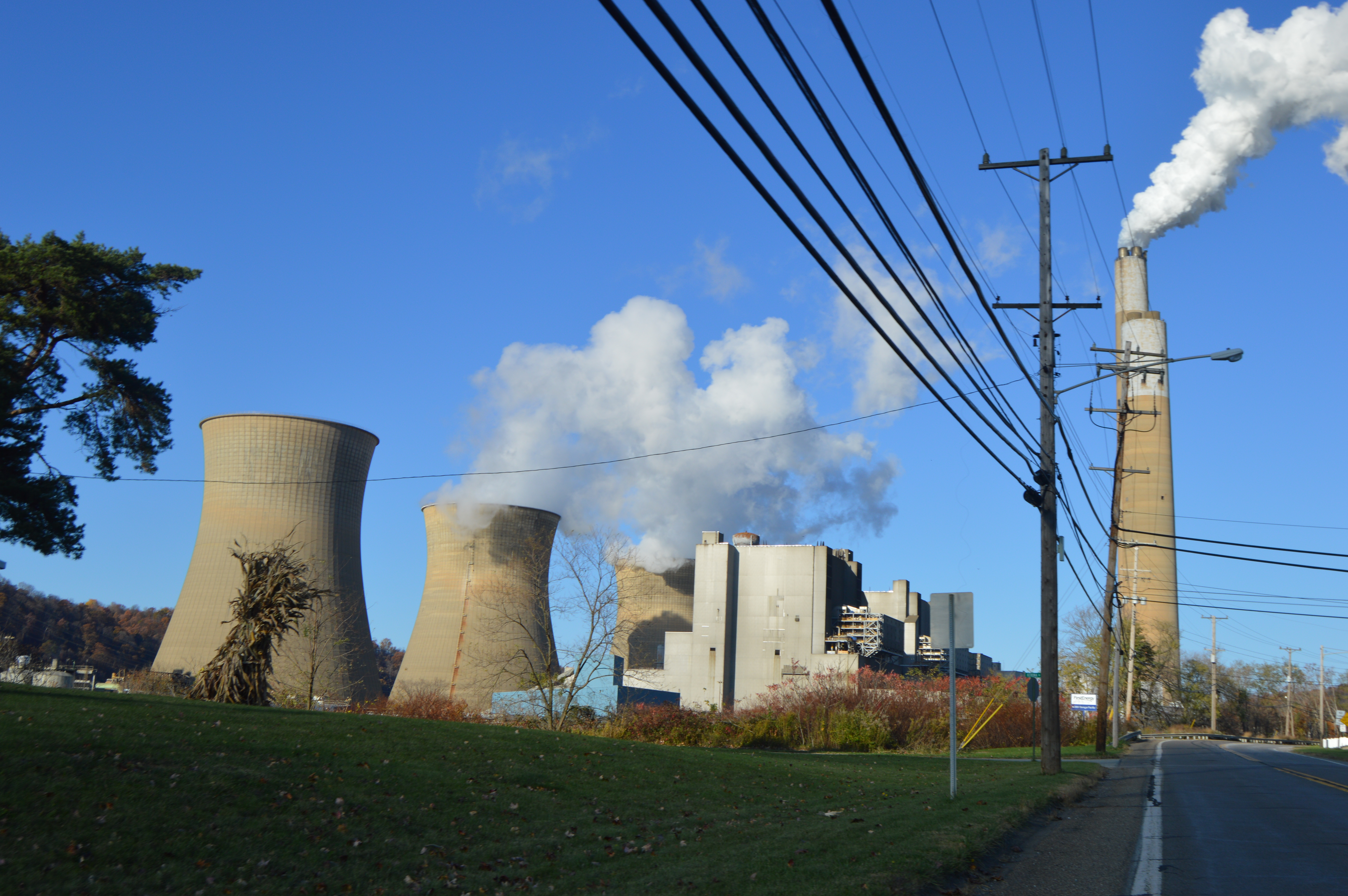
- The Beaver Valley Nuclear Power Station and Bruce Mansfield Power Plant
- Interactive map of Shippingport, Pennsylvania
- Location within Pennsylvania Location within the United States
- Coordinates: 40°37′28″N 80°25′29″W
- Country: United States
- State: Pennsylvania
- County: Beaver
- Incorporated: 1910

Government
  - Type: Borough Council

Area
  - Total: 3.68 sq mi (9.54 km^{2})
  - Land: 3.33 sq mi (8.62 km^{2})
  - Water: 0.36 sq mi (0.92 km^{2})
- Elevation: 741 ft (226 m)

Population (2020)
  - Total: 160
  - Estimate (2021): 157
  - Density: 56.8/sq mi (21.93/km^{2})
- Time zone: UTC-5 (Eastern (EST))
  - Summer (DST): UTC-4 (EDT)
- Zip code: 15077
- Area code: 724
- FIPS code: 42-70376
- Website: shippingportpa.com

Shippingport is a borough in western Beaver County, Pennsylvania, United States, located along the Ohio River. The population was 160 at the 2020 census. It is part of the Pittsburgh metropolitan area. Shippingport is home to the Beaver Valley Nuclear Power Station, and formerly the Bruce Mansfield Power Plant and Shippingport Atomic Power Station, the world's first full-scale atomic electric power plant devoted exclusively to peacetime uses.

== Nuclear energy ==
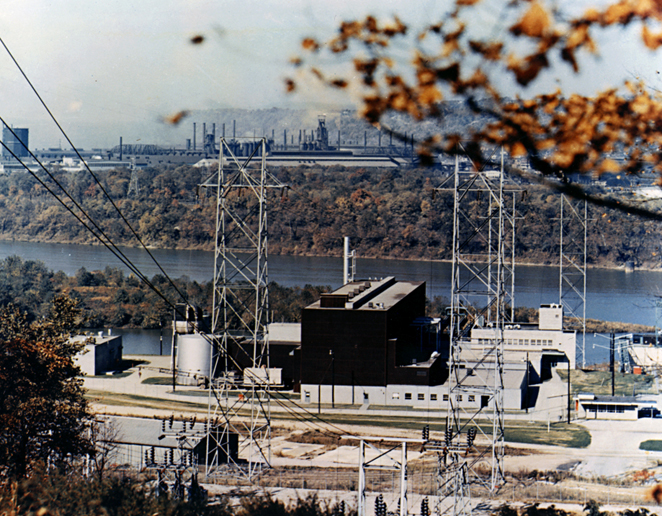
Shippingport Reactor in 1957

Shippingport is the site of the United States' first commercial nuclear power plant, the Shippingport Atomic Power Station, which began operation in 1957. Although the original Shippingport reactor was decommissioned in 1982, the Beaver Valley Nuclear Power Station Units 1 and 2 from the same site have been in operation since 1976 and 1987, respectively.

== Geography ==
Shippingport is located in west-central Beaver County at 40°37′25″N 80°25′29″W (40.623594, −80.424691), on the south side of the Ohio River. It is bordered to the southwest by Greene Township and to the southeast by Raccoon Township. To the north, across the Ohio River, are the boroughs of Industry (north) and Midland (northwest). The Shippingport Bridge carries Pennsylvania Route 168 across the river into Industry.

According to the United States Census Bureau, Shippingport has a total area of 3.7 square miles (9.5 km^{2}), of which 3.3 square miles (8.6 km^{2}) is land and 0.35 square miles (0.9 km^{2}), or 9.65%, is water.

== Demographics ==
Historical population
Census	Pop.	Note	%±
1920	299		—
1930	317		6.0%
1940	441		39.1%
1950	408		−7.5%
1960	383		−6.1%
1970	328		−14.4%
1980	255		−22.3%
1990	227		−11.0%
2000	237		4.4%
2010	214		−9.7%
2020	160		−25.2%
2021 (est.)	157	▼	−1.9%

As of the 2000 census, there were 237 people, 89 households, and 63 families residing in the borough. The population density was 72.2 inhabitants per square mile (27.9/km^{2}). There were 95 housing units at an average density of 29.0 per square mile (11.2/km^{2}). The racial makeup of the borough was 100.00% White.

There were 89 households, out of which 32.6% had children under the age of 18 living with them, 55.1% were married couples living together, 13.5% had a female householder with no husband present, and 29.2% were non-families. 25.8% of all households were made up of individuals, and 11.2% had someone living alone who was 65 years of age or older. The average household size was 2.66 and the average family size was 3.21.

In the borough the population was spread out, with 27.8% under the age of 18, 8.0% from 18 to 24, 28.3% from 25 to 44, 19.8% from 45 to 64, and 16.0% who were 65 years of age or older. The median age was 33 years. For every 100 females, there were 89.6 males. For every 100 females age 18 and over, there were 96.6 males.

The median income for a household in the borough was $33,333, and the median income for a family was $34,861. Males had a median income of $27,159 versus $15,938 for females. The per capita income for the borough was $13,759. About 7.0% of families and 7.5% of the population were below the poverty line, including 16.7% of those under the age of 18 and none of those 65 or over.

== Education ==
Children in Shippingport are served by the South Side Area School District. The current schools serving Shippingport are:

- South Side Elementary School – grades K–5
- South Side Middle School – grades 6–8
- South Side High School – grades 9–12

== See also ==
- List of cities and towns along the Ohio River
