= Beaver Valley Nuclear Power Station =

Nuclear power plant located near Shippingport, Pennsylvania

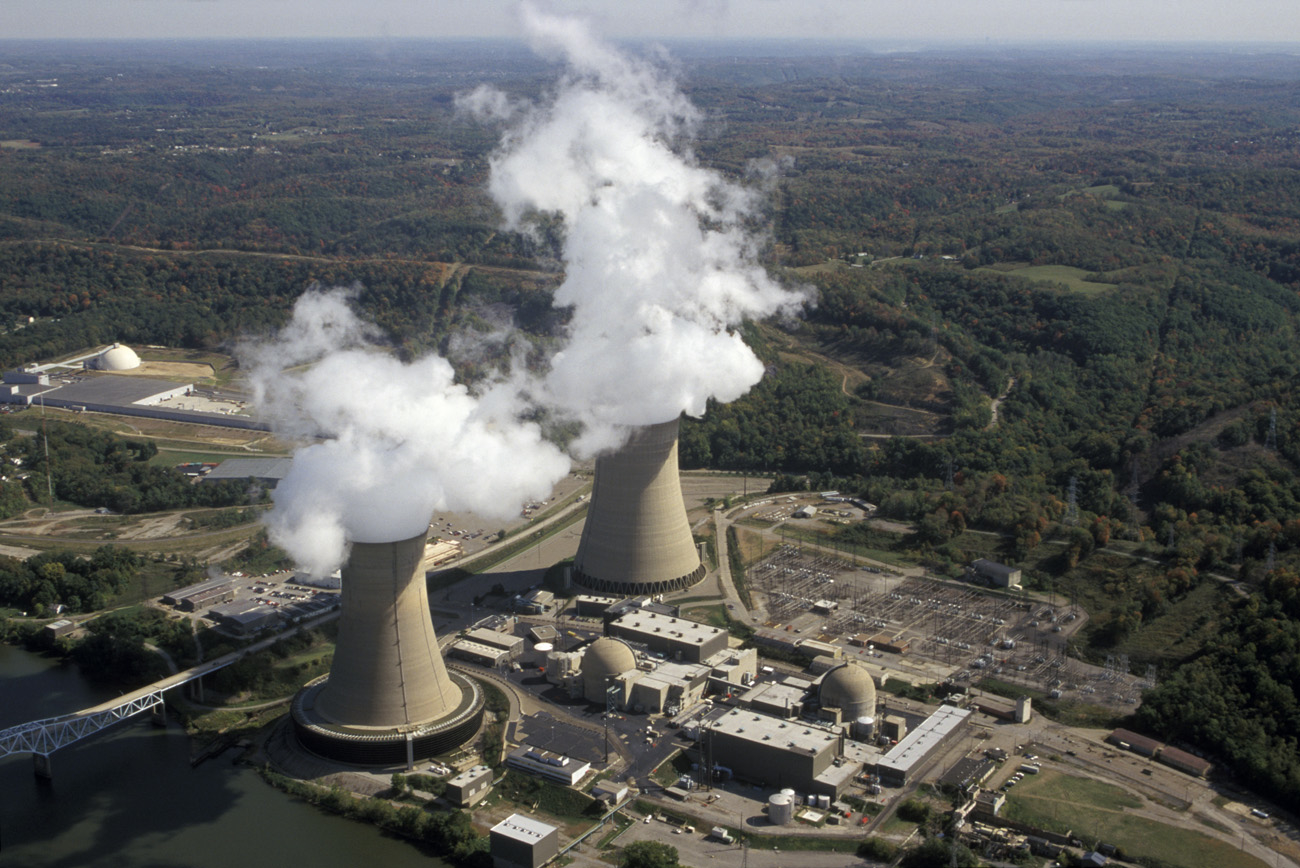
- Aerial photograph of the power plant
- Country: United States
- Location: Shippingport, Pennsylvania
- Coordinates: 40°37′24″N 80°25′50″W
- Status: Operational
- Construction began: Unit 1: June 26, 1970; Unit 2: May 3, 1974
- Commission date: Unit 1: October 1, 1976; Unit 2: November 17, 1987
- Construction cost: $8.520 billion (2007 USD)
- Owner: Vistra
- Operator: Vistra

Nuclear power station
- Reactor type: PWR
- Reactor supplier: Westinghouse
- Cooling towers: 2 × Natural Draft
- Cooling source: Ohio River
- Thermal capacity: 2 × 2900 MW_{th}

Power generation
- Units operational: 1 × 980 MWe; 1 × 960 MWe
- Make and model: WH 3-loop (DRYSUB)
- Nameplate capacity: 1826 MW
- Capacity factor: 95.73% (2017); 80.25% (lifetime)
- Annual net output: 14,381 GWh (2021)

External links
- Commons: Related media on Commons

Beaver Valley Power Station is a nuclear power plant on the Ohio River covering 1,000 acres (400 ha) near Shippingport, Pennsylvania, United States, roughly 27 miles (43 km) northwest of Pittsburgh. The plant is operated by Vistra Corp and power is generated by two Westinghouse pressurized water reactors. As of 2023, it is the fourth largest employer in Beaver County.

Beaver Valley 1 was used as the reference design for the French nuclear plant in Fessenheim.

In 2018, the previous owner FirstEnergy Solutions filed for bankruptcy and announced the plant would begin deactivation by 2021. However, upon emergence from bankruptcy in 2020 as new owner Energy Harbor, the shutdown of the plant was reversed largely due to then Governor Tom Wolf's decision to join the Regional Greenhouse Gas Initiative. Energy Harbor and the power plant were acquired by Vistra Corp in 2024.

== Surrounding population ==
The Nuclear Regulatory Commission defines two emergency planning zones around nuclear power plants: a plume exposure pathway zone with a radius of 10 miles (16 km), concerned primarily with exposure to, and inhalation of, airborne radioactive contamination, and an ingestion pathway zone of about 50 miles (80 km), concerned primarily with ingestion of food and liquid contaminated by radioactivity.

The 2010 U.S. population within 10 miles (16 km) of Beaver Valley was 114,514, a decrease of 6.6 percent in a decade, according to an analysis of U.S. Census data for msnbc.com. The 2010 U.S. population within 50 miles (80 km) was 3,140,766, a decrease of 3.7 percent since 2000. Cities within 50 miles include Pittsburgh (27 miles away, located upriver from the station).

== Seismic risk ==
The Nuclear Regulatory Commission's estimate of the risk each year of an earthquake intense enough to cause core damage to the reactor at Beaver Valley was Reactor 1: 1 in 20,833; Reactor 2: 1 in 45,455, according to an NRC study published in August 2010.

== Electricity production ==
Generation (MWh) of Beaver Valley Nuclear Power Station
Year	Jan	Feb	Mar	Apr	May	Jun	Jul	Aug	Sep	Oct	Nov	Dec	Annual (Total)
2001	1,231,013	1,102,516	1,166,836	950,419	1,233,917	1,121,462	1,217,758	1,198,702	591,649	1,025,347	1,142,673	1,196,944	13,179,236
2002	1,251,304	608,240	1,153,187	1,145,473	1,184,805	1,192,272	1,221,348	1,225,802	1,154,533	1,249,381	965,672	1,242,688	13,594,705
2003	1,255,979	1,055,681	697,138	603,373	1,170,240	1,166,613	1,236,025	1,231,773	827,308	934,518	1,176,607	1,263,843	12,619,098
2004	1,251,657	1,177,942	1,220,378	1,188,612	1,225,320	1,201,024	1,220,772	1,235,005	1,195,867	952,187	864,397	1,260,218	13,993,379
2005	1,255,576	1,090,158	1,199,215	668,912	1,207,987	1,191,284	1,219,273	1,223,496	1,194,150	1,248,452	1,213,007	1,258,802	13,970,312
2006	1,254,947	792,833	624,592	697,832	1,186,048	1,191,446	1,220,324	1,113,204	1,172,583	653,918	944,844	1,282,740	12,135,311
2007	1,285,853	1,154,054	1,261,440	1,279,576	1,308,772	1,224,796	1,300,702	1,281,551	1,075,003	757,142	1,281,442	1,330,533	14,540,864
2008	1,328,381	1,211,375	1,313,801	911,269	792,501	1,284,269	1,326,577	1,333,679	1,256,559	1,245,861	1,310,912	1,355,952	14,671,136
2009	1,357,886	1,216,023	1,354,586	1,037,877	861,301	1,294,649	1,335,155	1,322,102	1,297,394	900,693	689,664	1,344,115	14,011,445
2010	1,357,353	1,225,085	1,353,752	1,247,013	1,345,076	1,290,446	1,326,140	1,311,559	1,294,561	678,679	1,215,321	1,348,579	14,993,564
2011	1,358,220	1,223,500	794,430	945,182	1,380,844	1,292,883	1,322,972	1,333,629	1,297,709	1,353,637	1,314,586	1,359,030	14,976,622
2012	1,359,448	1,272,132	1,344,520	808,692	1,161,799	1,292,939	1,268,412	1,329,804	1,110,623	671,637	1,262,546	1,377,604	14,260,156
2013	1,375,394	1,178,630	1,377,800	1,322,946	1,269,906	1,100,118	1,342,437	1,348,437	1,262,925	685,882	1,116,453	1,398,375	14,779,303
2014	844,865	1,243,056	1,395,377	1,047,970	844,775	1,321,456	1,364,524	1,364,878	1,328,888	1,252,314	1,351,231	1,397,972	14,757,306
2015	1,398,293	1,261,672	1,391,529	1,037,656	829,260	1,269,925	1,364,082	1,366,499	1,174,970	703,561	1,346,473	1,393,852	14,537,772
2016	1,397,675	1,094,983	1,389,378	1,344,236	1,377,025	1,299,133	1,345,488	1,347,302	1,072,007	805,867	1,349,777	1,396,703	15,219,574
2017	1,394,300	1,257,282	1,381,341	1,064,573	899,597	1,314,750	1,349,908	1,357,233	1,320,533	1,373,254	1,207,854	1,390,882	15,311,507
2018	1,381,756	1,252,602	1,380,710	949,395	1,132,138	1,290,425	1,260,796	1,254,216	1,294,648	1,049,057	1,014,319	1,393,394	14,653,456
2019	1,393,366	1,256,203	1,380,532	1,320,761	1,366,244	1,306,762	1,344,244	1,353,568	1,257,007	874,858	1,210,506	1,392,419	15,456,470
2020	1,391,732	1,302,673	1,340,253	857,986	1,206,458	1,310,120	1,208,593	1,363,603	1,313,674	1,372,307	1,338,512	1,387,482	15,393,393
2021	1,391,329	1,254,453	1,374,763	862,925	1,075,609	1,300,647	1,352,121	1,348,384	1,308,693	781,423	949,760	1,381,289	14,381,396
2022	1,387,928	1,252,103	1,379,442	1,333,966	1,360,796	955,857	1,320,353	1,348,094	1,314,936	845,831	862,952	1,387,769	14,750,027
2023	1,387,043	1,251,449	1,370,780	831,678	849,294	1,318,244	1,350,951	1,355,943	1,229,198	1,337,087	1,343,339	1,387,447	15,012,453
2024	1,386,896	1,298,444	1,312,902	930,638	849,757	1,295,618	1,351,119	1,354,073	1,319,363	952,110	1,020,860	1,389,045	14,460,825
2025	1,390,809	1,168,865	1,376,125	1,327,771	1,347,451	1,300,484	1,334,834	1,351,818	1,322,379	922,810	851,279	1,389,635	15,084,260
2026	1,392,717	1,256,612	1,381,125	745,007	1,261,090	1,315,004	1,344,420	1,351,841					--

== See also ==
- Shippingport Reactor - Located adjacent to the Beaver Valley Power Station
- Energy in the United States
  - Renewable energy in the United States
