= Practical Color Coordinate System =

The Practical Color Coordinate System (PCCS) is a discrete color space developed by the Japan Color Research Institute in 1964. PCCS is notable for indexing colors by just two characteristics, hue and tone, as opposed to the three (hue, value, and chroma) traditionally used by systems such as the Munsell color system.

== Hue ==
PCCS defines 24 gradations of hue, arranged to be perceptually equal. These hues are determined based on the psychological primaries (●) and their psychological complements (○) as well as the additive and subtractive primaries (△).

Procedure	Hue	Number:Symbol	Name	Notes
		1:pR	Purplish red	
●		2:R	Red	
△		3:yR	Yellowish red	Additive primary red.
		4:rO	Reddish orange	
		5:O	Orange	
○		6:yO	Yellowish orange	
		7:rY	Reddish yellow	
● △		8:Y	Yellow	Psychological & subtractive primary yellow.
		9:gY	Greenish yellow	
		10:YG	Yellow green	
		11:yG	Yellowish green	
● △		12:G	Green	Psychological & additive primary green.
		13:bG	Bluish green	
○		14:BG	Blue green	
		15:BG	Blue green	
△		16:gB	Greenish blue	Subtractive primary cyan.
		17:B	Blue	
●		18:B	Blue	Psychological primary blue.
△		19:pB	Purplish blue	Additive primary blue.
○		20:V	Violet	
		21:bP	Bluish purple	
		22:P	Purple	
		23:rP	Reddish purple	
○ △		24:RP	Red purple	Subtractive primary magenta.

Upon comparing two hues, the difference in hue number can be used to determine the following relationships.

Difference	Relationship	Corresponding hues when based on red（■ 2:R)
0	Same hue	■ 2:R
1	Adjacent hues	■ 1:rP, ■ 3:rY
2–3	Similar hues	■ 4:rO, ■ 5:O, ■ 23:rP, ■ 24:RP
4–7	Intermediate hues	■ 6:yO, ■ 7:rY, ■ 8:Y, ■ 9:gY, ■ 19:pB, ■ 20:V, ■ 21:bP, ■ 22:P
8–10	Contrasting hues	■ 10:YG, ■ 11:yG, ■ 12:G, ■ 16:gB, ■ 17:B, ■ 18:B
11	Adjacent complementary hues	■ 13:bG, ■ 15:BG
12	Complementary hue	■ 14:BG

== Tone ==
PCCS defines 12 tones and 5 achromatic greys based on Munsell categorizations of lightness and chroma. Colors within the same tone category will have a similar quality regardless of hue. Lightness ranges from 1.5 (black) to 9.5 (white), while chroma ranges from 0s (achromatic) to 9s (pure color).

9.5	W	p	lt
	ltGy	p	lt	b
	ltGy	ltg	sf	b	v
5.5	mGy	ltg	sf	s	v
5.5	mGy	g	d	s	v
	dkGy	g	d	dp	v
	dkGy	dkg	dk	dp
Lightness 1.5	Bk	dkg	dk
	Saturation 0s	1–3s	4–6s	7–8s	9s

Classification	Tone	Symbol	Name
Light pure color (tints)		p	Pale
Light pure color (tints)		lt	Light
Light pure color (tints)		b	Bright
Pure color		v	Vivid
Dark pure color (shades)		dp	Deep
Dark pure color (shades)		dk	Dark
Dark pure color (shades)		dkg	Dark greyish
Intermediate tones (tones)		ltg	Light greyish
Intermediate tones (tones)		sf	Soft
Intermediate tones (tones)		s	Strong
Intermediate tones (tones)		d	Dull
Intermediate tones (tones)		g	Greyish

"Vivid" colors are pure colors and represent the highest possible chroma for their respective hue. Light pure colors (pale, light, and bright) result from mixing the pure color with only white. Dark pure colors (deep, dark, and dark-greyish) result from mixing the pure color with only black. The intermediate colors (light greyish, soft, strong, dull, and greyish) result from mixing the pure color with both black and white.

These charts use reddish orange (■ 4:rO) as the example hue. 4:rO has a vertically symmetrical hue plane because the pure color has a lightness of about 5.5. This is not the case for all hues; pure colors with high lightness (e.g. ■ 8:Y) or low lightness (e.g. ■ 20:V) have accordingly skewed hue planes. Despite this difference in lightness, all pure colors are considered "vivid." In general, tone categories are meant to group colors that give a similar impression, so colors within a tone category do not necessarily have matching lightness or chroma.
