= Industry, Pennsylvania =

Borough in Pennsylvania, US

- Borough
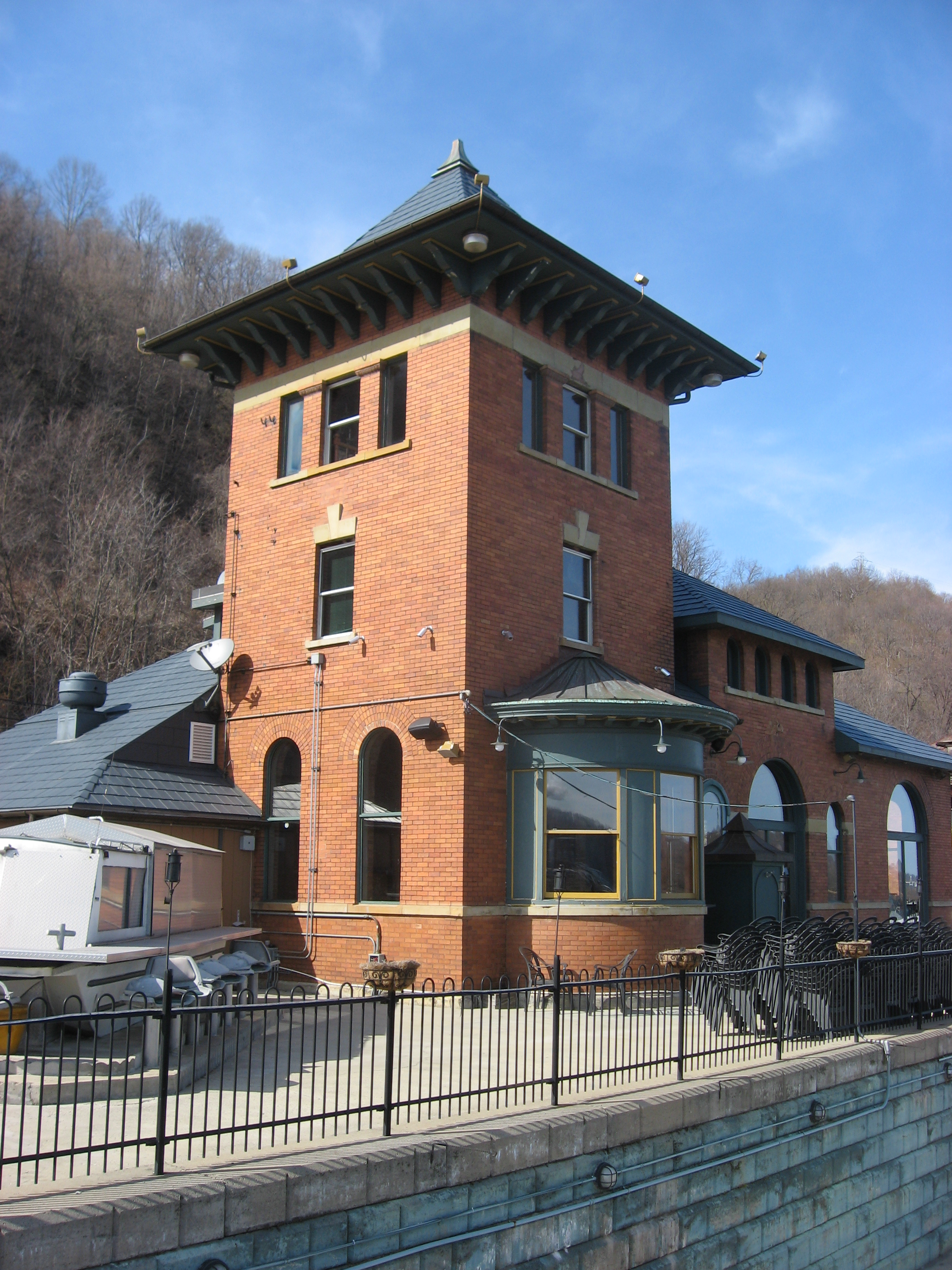
- Merrill Lock No. 6 (1904); National Register of Historic Places
- Interactive map of Industry, Pennsylvania
- Location within Pennsylvania Location within the United States
- Coordinates: 40°39′22″N 80°24′34″W
- Country: United States
- State: Pennsylvania
- County: Beaver
- Settled: 1836
- Organized as township: 1856
- Incorporated as borough: 1960

Government
  - Type: Borough Council
  - Mayor: Kevin D. Kelley Sr.

Area
  - Total: 10.98 sq mi (28.43 km^{2})
  - Land: 10.14 sq mi (26.25 km^{2})
  - Water: 0.84 sq mi (2.18 km^{2})
- Elevation: 1,040 ft (320 m)

Population (2020)
  - Total: 1,838
  - Density: 181.4/sq mi (70.02/km^{2})
- Time zone: UTC-5 (Eastern (EST))
  - Summer (DST): UTC-4 (EDT)
- Zip code: 15052
- Area code: 724
- FIPS code: 42-36944

Industry is a borough in western Beaver County, Pennsylvania, United States, along the Ohio River. As of the 2020 census, the population was 1,838, almost unchanged from 2010. It is part of the Pittsburgh metropolitan area.

== History ==
The borough was organized as the Township of Industry in 1856 from an electoral district named Industry that comprised portions of Ohio Township and Brighton Township. The township incorporated as a borough in 1960.

The village of Industry was a settlement in the township laid out in 1836 by William McCallister, though a post office had been established in 1833. The name was selected to promote the town's industry.

== Geography ==
Industry is located at 40°39′22″N 80°24′34″W (40.656017, −80.409538).

Pennsylvania Route 68 (Midland Beaver Road) is the main road through the borough, leading west into Midland and east to Beaver.

According to the United States Census Bureau, Industry has a total area of 11.0 square miles (28.4 km^{2}), of which 10.1 square miles (26.2 km^{2}) is land and 0.85 square miles (2.2 km^{2}), or 7.68%, is water.

The community of Merrill was located in the southeastern part of the borough, along the Ohio River. No one has lived in Merrill since the 1960s at the latest (probably much earlier).

=== Surrounding and adjacent neighborhoods ===
Industry has four land borders: with Brighton Township to the north, Vanport Township in the far northeast corner, Midland to the southwest, and Ohioville to the northwest. Across the Ohio River to the south, Industry runs adjacent with (from west to east) Shippingport, Raccoon Township and Potter Township.

== Demographics ==
Historical population
Census	Pop.	Note	%±
1880	499		—
1910	764		—
1920	834		9.2%
1930	996		19.4%
1940	1,208		21.3%
1950	1,788		48.0%
1960	2,338		30.8%
1970	2,442		4.4%
1980	2,417		−1.0%
1990	2,124		−12.1%
2000	1,921		−9.6%
2010	1,835		−4.5%
2020	1,838		0.2%
2021 (est.)	1,810	▼	−1.5%

As of the 2000 census, there were 1,921 people, 772 households, and 581 families residing in the borough. The population density was 195.2 inhabitants per square mile (75.4/km^{2}). There were 816 housing units at an average density of 82.9 per square mile (32.0/km^{2}). The racial makeup of the borough was 96.88% White, 1.93% African American, 0.05% Native American, 0.16% Asian, 0.57% from other races, and 0.42% from two or more races. 1.41% of the population were Hispanic or Latino of any race.

There were 772 households, out of which 28.9% had children under the age of 18 living with them, 60.0% were married couples living together, 9.5% had a female householder with no husband present, and 24.7% were non-families. 22.0% of all households were made up of individuals, and 11.0% had someone living alone who was 65 years of age or older. The average household size was 2.47 and the average family size was 2.85.

In the borough the population was spread out, with 21.3% under the age of 18, 6.9% from 18 to 24, 26.1% from 25 to 44, 27.7% from 45 to 64, and 18.0% who were 65 years of age or older. The median age was 43 years. For every 100 females, there were 98.7 males. For every 100 females age 18 and over, there were 94.2 males.

The median income for a household in the borough was $38,125, and the median income for a family was $43,571. Males had a median income of $34,667 versus $22,731 for females. The per capita income for the borough was $18,337. 8.1% of the population and 6.9% of families were below the poverty line. Out of the total population, 14.0% of those under the age of 18 and none of those 65 and older were living below the poverty line.

== Recreation ==
A small portion of Pennsylvania State Game Lands Number 173 is located in Industry.

== Education ==
Industry is home to the Western Beaver County School District main campus, including the Western Beaver Junior/Senior High School.

== See also ==
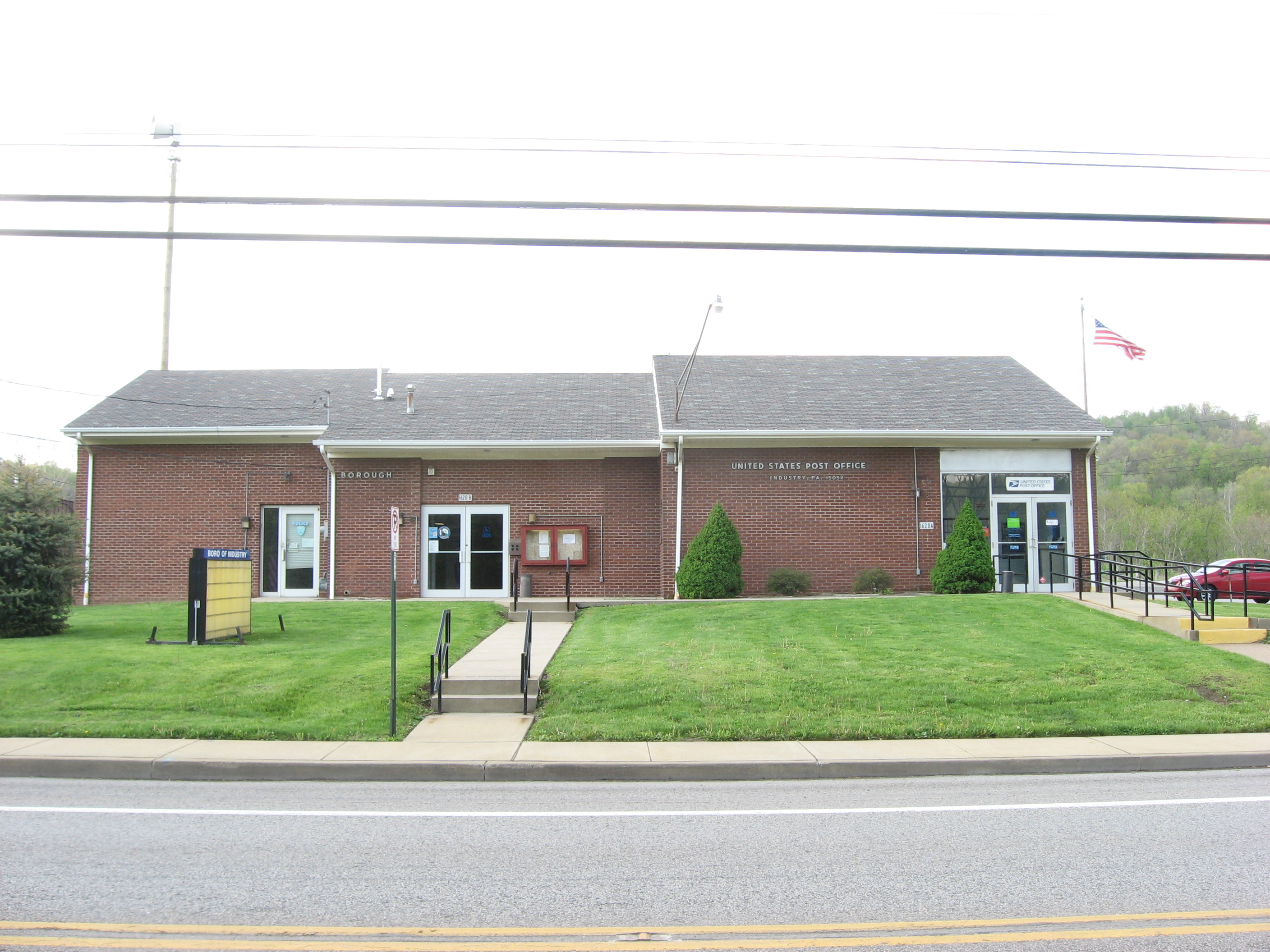
Industry post office and borough building

- List of cities and towns on the Ohio River
