= Pennsylvania Cyber Charter School =

School district in Pennsylvania

Coordinates: 40.63851°N 80.45490°W

Location
- 652 Midland Avenue; Midland, Pennsylvania 15059; United States

Information
- Type: Online
- Motto: The Learning Never Stops
- Established: 2000
- CEO: Brian Hayden
- Grades: K - 12
- Enrollment: Public (PA only), 10,000+
- Website: www.pacyber.org

The Pennsylvania Cyber Charter School, known simply as PA Cyber, is a public cyber charter school founded in Midland, Pennsylvania in 2000.

== Regional Office locations ==
- Allentown, Pennsylvania
- Erie, Pennsylvania
- Greensburg, Pennsylvania
- Harrisburg, Pennsylvania
- Midland, Pennsylvania
- Philadelphia, Pennsylvania
- Pittsburgh, Pennsylvania
- State College, Pennsylvania
- Warrendale, Pennsylvania
- Wilkes-Barre, Pennsylvania

== Alumni ==
- Gabby Barrett, country singer
- Sabrina Carpenter, actress and singer
- Alex Kirilloff, MLB outfielder for the Minnesota Twins
- Alison Riske, tennis player
- Nia Sioux, dancer, actress, and singer

=== Notable staff ===
- Ellis Cannon, talk show host, teacher at the Ellis Cannon Academy of Sports Media and Broadcasting
