= Western Beaver County School District =

School district in Pennsylvania, U.S.

Coordinates: 40.69298°N 80.47115°W

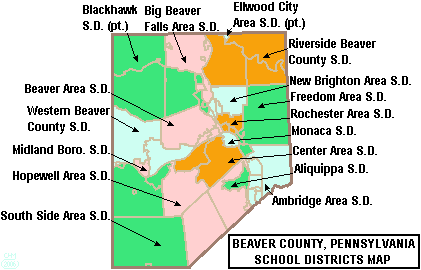

Address
- 343 Ridgemont Drive Midland, Beaver County, Pennsylvania, 15059; United States

District information
- Type: Public

Other information
- Website: www.westernbeaver.org

The Western Beaver County School District is a diminutive, rural, public school district serving the boroughs of Industry, Glasgow and Ohioville, Pennsylvania. Western Beaver County School District encompasses approximately 34.5 square miles (89 km^{2}). According to 2000 federal census data, it served a resident population of 5,743. By 2010, the district's population declined to 5,429 people. The educational attainment levels for the Western Beaver County School District population (25 years old and over) were 92.5% high school graduates and 14.4% college graduates. The district is one of the 500 public school districts of Pennsylvania.

According to the Pennsylvania Budget and Policy Center, 36.5% of the district's pupils lived at 185% or below the Federal Poverty Level as shown by their eligibility for the federal free or reduced price school meal programs in 2012. In 2009, the district residents’ per capita income was $18,006, while the median family income was $46,433. In the Commonwealth, the median family income was $49,501 and the United States median family income was $49,445, in 2010. In Beaver County, the median household income was $49,217. By 2013, the median household income in the United States rose to $52,100. In 2014, the median household income in the United States was $53,700.

Special education services are provided by the district and the Beaver Valley Intermediate Unit #27. Occupational training and adult education in various vocational and technical fields were provided by the district and the Beaver County Career & Technology Center.

Western Beaver County School District operates just two schools: Western Beaver Junior/Senior High School (6th grade through 12th grade) and Fairview Elementary School (preschool through fifth grade).

Snyder Elementary School offered fifth and sixth grades. It operated until 2011, when it was closed due to declining enrollment districtwide. The sixth grade was moved to the junior senior high building, while the fifth grade was relocated to Fairview Elementary School.
