= Duquesne Light Company =

Energy services holding company in Pittsburgh, Pennsylvania

- Company type: Private company
- Industry: Utility
- Founded: 1912
- Headquarters: Pittsburgh, Pennsylvania
- Key people: Kevin Walker, CEO
- Products: Electric power and related services
- Owner: GIC Private Limited (31%); IFM Investors (25%); Macquarie Group (24%); Macquarie/First State Super (13%); State Super (7%)
- Number of employees: 1,200
- Website: www.duquesnelight.com

Duquesne Light Holdings, Inc. (DLH) is an energy services holding company formed in 1989 to serve as the holding company for Duquesne Light Company and to engage in certain unregulated energy and related businesses. After a 2007 acquisition, DLH is a wholly owned subsidiary of parent company DQE Holdings LLC, with principal executive offices located in Pittsburgh, Pennsylvania.

Through its chief subsidiary, Duquesne Light Company, the corporation provides energy to over 588,000 homes and businesses.

== Historic incorporation ==
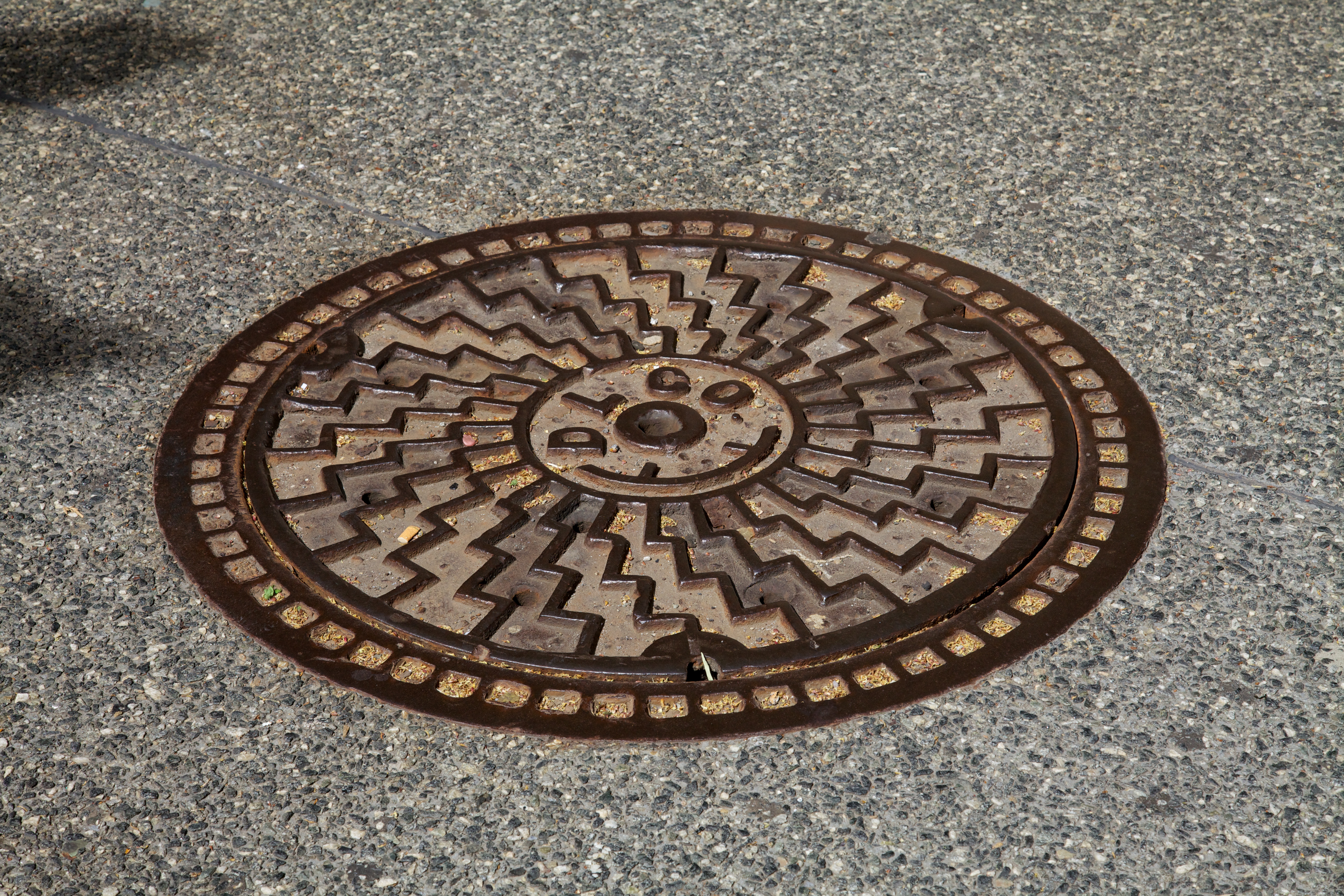
Duquesne Light manhole cover.

Duquesne Light was one of the dozens of companies founded by inventor George Westinghouse and for its first 75 years of operation (1870s-1940s) was a subsidiary of the holding company known as the "Philadelphia Company". Other such companies also founded by Westinghouse such as the Equitable Gas company and other "Equitable" energy/electronic companies were equal subsidiaries with DQE when it was a subsidiary of the 'Philadelphia Company'.

In 1997, Duquesne and Allegheny Energy agreed to a $4.3 billion merger with headquarters remaining in Hagerstown, Maryland. However DQE backed out of the deal by 1998.

In May 2007, Duquesne was acquired by a consortium led by affiliates of the Australian-based Macquarie Group Limited. The consortium consists of several institutional investors which own all of the common equity of parent company, DQE Holdings, LLC. This classifies it as an investor-owned utility. In 2010, GIC Private Limited acquired a 29% stake from original investor DUET Group.

In 2018, Duquesne Light began offering $3,000 rebates for the purchase of electric vehicles in an effort to promote adoption of electric vehicles and increase the number on the road. The company partnered with Nissan North America to execute the program. People in Pennsylvania who purchase electric vehicles, in addition to the rebate, get up to $7,500 in federal tax credits and a $1,750 rebate from the state. In 2019, the company named Steve Malnight as CEO, replacing Rich Riazzi, who had held the post since 2010.
