= Pennsylvania State Game Lands Number 31 =

Park in the United States

- Location within Pennsylvania Location within the United States
- Location: Jefferson County
- Coordinates: 41°2′28″N 79°1′5″W
- Area: 5,175.63 acres (2,094.50 ha)
- Elevation: 1,824 feet (556 m)
- Max. elevation: 2,046 feet (624 m)
- Min. elevation: 1,340 feet (410 m)
- Owner: Pennsylvania Game Commission

The Pennsylvania State Game Lands Number 31 are Pennsylvania State Game Lands in Jefferson County in Pennsylvania in the United States providing hunting, bird watching, and other activities.

== Geography ==
State Game Lands Number 31 is located in Knox, McCalmont and Oliver Townships in Jefferson County. Nearby communities include unincorporated communities Adrian Mines, Anita, Battle Hollow, Coolspring, Cortez, Coulter, Crawfordtown, East Branch, Frostburg, Fuller, Green Valley, Knox Dale, Markton, Meredith, Oliveburg, Panic, Ramsaytown and Tait.

Highways passing nearby SGL 31 include Interstate 80, U.S. Routes 119 and 322, and Pennsylvania Routes 28, 36, 210, 310, 436, 536 and 950.

SGL 31 is drained by Clutch Run, Hadden Run, Hickock Run, Indiancamp Run, and Middle Branch Little Sandy Creek, all tributaries of Little Sandy Creek, which leads to Redbank Creek, part of the Allegheny River watershed.

Other nearby protected areas in Pennsylvania within 30 miles (48 km) include Allegheny National Forest, Clear Creek State Park, Cook Forest State Park, Parker Dam State Park and S. B. Elliott State Park as well as Pennsylvania State Game Lands Numbers 24, 28, 44, 54, 63, 72, 77, 87, 90, 105, 120, 137, 174, 185, 195, 244, 248, 262, 266, 283, 287, 320, 330, 331.

== Statistics ==
SGL 31 was entered into the Geographic Names Information System on 2 August 1979 as identification number 1188510. Elevations range from 1,340 feet (410 m) to 2,046 feet (624 m), located on a single parcel at 41°2′17″N 79°1′5″W.

== Biology ==
Hunting and trapping species include bear (Ursus americanus), deer (Odocoileus virginanus), pheasant (Phasianus colchicus) and turkey (Meleagris vison).

== See also ==
Pennsylvania State Game Lands
