= Pennsylvania State Game Lands Number 24 =

Park in the United States

- Location within Pennsylvania Location within the United States
- Location: Clarion County; Forest County
- Coordinates: 41°26′14″N 79°16′15″W
- Area: 8,500 acres (3,400 ha)
- Elevation: 1,572 feet (479 m)
- Max. elevation: 1,681 feet (512 m)
- Min. elevation: 1,280 feet (390 m)
- Owner: Pennsylvania Game Commission

The Pennsylvania State Game Lands Number 24 are Pennsylvania State Game Lands in Clarion, and Forest counties in Pennsylvania in the United States providing hunting, bird watching, and other activities.

== Geography ==
State Game Lands Number 24 is located in Farmington Township in Clarion County, and in Green and Jenks townships in Forest County. Nearby populated places include Crown, Frills Corner, Gilfoyle, Golinza, Guitonville, Leeper, Lickingville, Muzette, Newmansville, North Pine Grove, Tylersburg, Vowinckel, Williams and Wolf's Corners.

Pennsylvania Route 66 is northeast/southwest oriented and passes less than 0.25 miles (0.40 km) from the southeast portion of SGL 24; Pennsylvania Route 36 passes to the southwest. The Knox and Kane Railroad roughly follows Route 66 also passing close to the southeast.

Named streams in SGL 24 include Big Weaver Run, Bull Run, Coon Creek, Dans Run, Ellsworth Run, Fox Run, Irish Run, Judy Run, Little Coon Creek, Little Coon Run, Little Weaver Run, Walley Run, Wolf Run, and Zipp Run, which all are part of the Allegheny River watershed.

Nearby recreational and protected areas include:

=== Federal ===
- Allegheny National Forest

=== State ===
- Chapman State Park
- Clear Creek State Park
- Cook Forest State Park
- Oil Creek State Park

=== Pennsylvania State Game Lands ===
- Pennsylvania State Game Lands Number 25
- Pennsylvania State Game Lands Number 28
- Pennsylvania State Game Lands Number 29
- Pennsylvania State Game Lands Number 31
- Pennsylvania State Game Lands Number 44
- Pennsylvania State Game Lands Number 45
- Pennsylvania State Game Lands Number 54
- Pennsylvania State Game Lands Number 72
- Pennsylvania State Game Lands Number 74
- Pennsylvania State Game Lands Number 86
- Pennsylvania State Game Lands Number 96
- Pennsylvania State Game Lands Number 143
- Pennsylvania State Game Lands Number 244
- Pennsylvania State Game Lands Number 266
- Pennsylvania State Game Lands Number 272
- Pennsylvania State Game Lands Number 283
- Pennsylvania State Game Lands Number 309

== Statistics ==
SGL 24 was entered into the Geographic Names Information System on 2 August 1979 as identification number 1210214, elevation is listed as 1,572 feet (479 m). Consisting of a single parcel located at 41°26′14″N 79°16′15″W, elevations range from 1,280 feet (390 m) to 1,681 feet (512 m).

== Biology ==
SGL 24 is roughly 94% terrestrial forested with a small percentage of wetland. Game species include bear (Ursus americanus), deer (Odocoileus virginianus), ruffed grouse (Bonasa umbellus), gray squirrel, (Sciurus carolinensis), turkey (Meleagris gallopavo). Non-game species include northern goshawk (Accipiter gentilis), Blackburnian warbler (Setophaga fusca), black-throated blue warbler (Setophaga caerulescens) and magnolia warbler (Setophaga magnolia).

== See also ==
- Pennsylvania State Game Lands
