= Pennsylvania State Game Lands Number 211 =

Pennsylvania State Gamelands Number 211
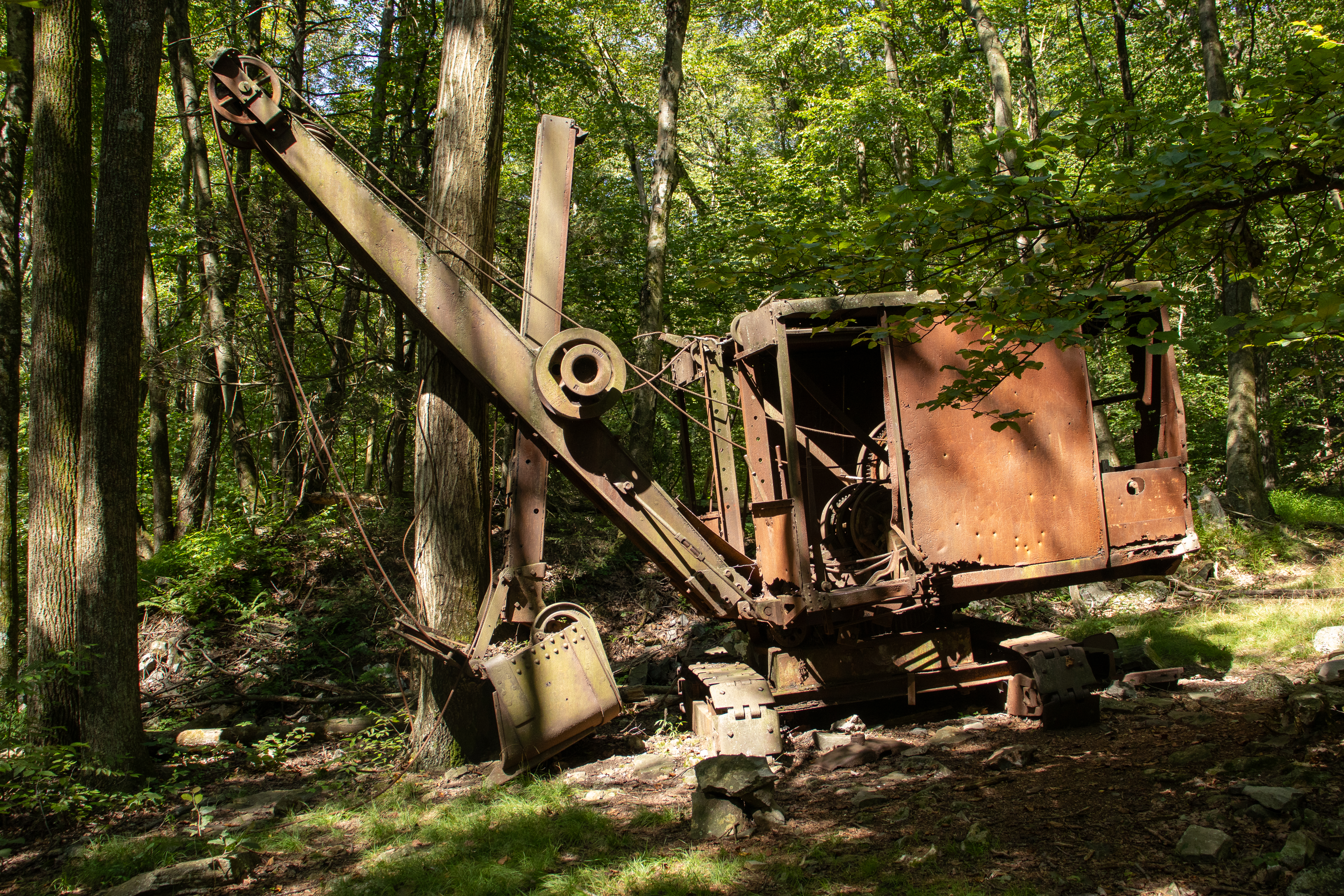
- The General
- Interactive map of Pennsylvania State Gamelands; Number 211
- Location: Dauphin County, Pennsylvania, Lebanon County, Pennsylvania, and Schuylkill County, Pennsylvania
- Area: 43,971 acres (17,794 ha)
- Elevation: 1,027 feet (313 m)
- Designation: Pennsylvania State Game Lands
- Governing body: Pennsylvania Game Commission

Pennsylvania State Game Lands Number 211 are Pennsylvania State Game Lands in Dauphin County, Lebanon County, and Schuylkill County, in Pennsylvania, in the United States. In total, the game lands have an area of 43,971 acres (17,794 ha). The terrain runs along ridgelines and is wooded, covering portions of Fishing Creek, Stony Creek, and Clark Creek Drainages. An abandoned railroad bed traverses the game lands from east to west in the Stony Valley. This Stony Valley Railroad Grade, the Appalachian Trail, and Horse-Shoe Trail provide outdoor recreation opportunities. Primary game species within the game lands are white-tailed deer, squirrel, grouse, and turkey.

Nearby recreational areas include Boyd Big Tree Preserve Conservation Area, Joseph E. Ibberson Conservation Area, and Fort Hunter Historic District.

== Natural Features ==
Within the Pennsylvania State Game Lands 211, there are numerous natural features that attract visitors. Devil's Race Course, located at the headwaters of Rattling Run, is a large boulder field. Today, the Horse-Shoe Trail passes by the boulder field, known for the rattling sound caused by water running through the boulders. The Second Mountain Hawk Watch provides a vantage point over Fort Indiantown Gap and is in the path of migratory hawks. Boxcar Rocks is a notable rock feature, an outcropping of conglomerate rock, thought to look like a railroad wreck of boxcars. There are also at least a dozen Sand Springs in Stony Valley and Clark's Valley known for their sandy water.

== Biology ==
American beaver have created two swamps in the game lands, known as Evening Branch Beaver Swamp and Jeff's Swamp. These swamps are home to wood ducks, great blue herons, white-tailed deer, and many songbirds. The common game animals in the game lands are white-tailed deer, squirrel, grouse, and turkey.

Pennsylvania State Game Lands 211 contains a large American Holly grove, once thought to be the largest in the Commonwealth of Pennsylvania.

== History ==
The Schuylkill and Susquehanna Railroad ran through Stony Valley from Reading Railroad's mainline to the Pennsylvania Railroad's Rockville Bridge. It was first opened in 1854 to haul coal, the Philadelphia & Reading Railroad took over the line in 1872. Once a bridge burnt down in 1939, the company abandoned the line. Today, the Stony Valley Rail-Trail exists on the former railroad grade.

Evidence of the area's history still exists through the Stony Mountain Fire Tower, Summit Siding, Rausch Gap Cemetery, The General, Victoria Iron Furnace, and the Yellow Spring Stone Tower.
