= Pennsylvania State Game Lands Number 28 =

Park in the United States

- Location within Pennsylvania Location within the United States
- Location: Elk County; Forest County
- Coordinates: 41°26′46″N 78°56′12″W
- Area: 11,257.42 acres (4,555.72 ha)
- Elevation: 1,740 feet (530 m)
- Max. elevation: 1,847 feet (563 m)
- Min. elevation: 1,260 feet (380 m)
- Owner: Pennsylvania Game Commission

The Pennsylvania State Game Lands Number 28 are Pennsylvania State Game Lands in Elk, Forest and Jefferson Counties in Pennsylvania in the United States providing hunting, bird watching, and other activities.

== Geography ==
State Game Lands Number 28 is located in Highland, Millstone and Spring Creek Townships in Elk County, and in Jenks Township in Forest County.

Nearby communities include Beuhler Corner, Corduroy, Four Corners, Hallton, Lake City, Owls Nest, Sackett and Threemile in Elk County, and Lamonaville and Parrish in Forest County.

Highways in the vicinity of SGL 28 include U.S. Route 219, Pennsylvania Route 66, Pennsylvania Route 948 and Pennsylvania Route 949.

== Hydrography ==
The Clarion River is a portion of the southern border of SGL 28. Tributaries draining SGL 28 include Belvidere Run, Big Run, Hill Run, Lappin Run, Little Crow Run, Little Run, McCellan Run, Pearsall Run, Pigeon Run, Red Lick Run and Spring Creek. Clarion River and its tributaries are all part of the Allegheny River watershed.

== Protected areas ==
The Game Lands is almost surrounded by the Allegheny National Forest to the west, north, and east. Other protected areas within 30 miles (48 km) include Bendigo State Park, Chapman State Park, Cook Forest State Park, Elk State Park, Kinzua Bridge State Park, and Parker Dam State Park, and State Game Lands Pennsylvania State Game Lands Numbers 14, 24, 25, 29, 31, 34, 44, 54, 62, 72, 74, 77, 86, 244, 266, 283, 293, 331.

== Statistics ==
SGL 28 was entered into the Geographic Names Information System on 2 August 1979 as identification number 1199600. Elevations range from 1,260 feet (380 m) to 1,847 feet (563 m) and consists of 11,257.42 acres (4,555.72 ha) in a single parcel located at 41°26′46″N 78°56′12″W.

== Biology ==
Hunting and trapping species in SGL include bear (Ursus americanus), beaver (Castor canadensis), deer (Odocoileus virginianus), Mallard (Anas platyrhynchos), goose (Branta canadensis) and turkey (Meleagris vison). Forest species include American beech (Fagus grandifolia), Black birch (Betula nigra), Black cherry (Prunus serotina), Eastern hemlock (Tsuga canadensis), Red maple (Acer rubrum), Sugar maple (Acer saccharum), Chestnut oak (Quercus montana), Northern red oak, (Quercus rubra), White oak (Quercus alba) and Eastern white pine (Pinus strobus).

== See also ==
- Pennsylvania State Game Lands
- Pennsylvania State Game Lands Number 14, also located in Elk County
- Pennsylvania State Game Lands Number 24, also located in Forest County
- Pennsylvania State Game Lands Number 25, also located in Elk County
