= Pennsylvania State Game Lands Number 29 =

Park in the United States

- Location within Pennsylvania Location within the United States
- Location: Warren County
- Coordinates: 41°43′23″N 79°13′9″W
- Area: 9,800 acres (4,000 ha)
- Elevation: 1,883 feet (574 m)
- Max. elevation: 1,947 feet (593 m)
- Min. elevation: 1,440 feet (440 m)
- Owner: Pennsylvania Game Commission

The Pennsylvania State Game Lands Number 29 are Pennsylvania State Game Lands in Warren Counties in Pennsylvania in the United States providing hunting, bird watching, and other activities.

== Geography ==
State Game Lands Number 29 is located in Cherry Grove, Pleasant and Watson Townships in Warren County. Nearby communities include unincorporated communities Althorn, Buchers Mills, Cherry Grove, Hearts Content, and Hermit Springs.

Highways in the vicinity of SGL 29 include U.S. Route 6 and U.S. Route 62, and Pennsylvania Route 59 and Pennsylvania Route 666.

SGL 29 is located within the Allegheny River watershed and is drained by Tionesta Creek, West Branch Tionesta Creek, Adams Run, Clark Run, Conklin Run, Davis Run, Jones Run, Mix Run, Shaw Run, Slater Run, Tom Run and Wildcat Run.

Except for Chapman State Park to the northeast, SGL 29 is completely surrounded by the Allegheny National Forest. Other protected areas within 30 miles of SGL 29 include Cook Forest State Park and Oil Creek State Park, Jamestown Audubon Nature Center, and Pennsylvania State Game Lands Numbers 24, 28, 47, 86, 96, 122, 143, 144, 197, 253, 263, 272, 282, 283, 291, 306 and 309.

== Statistics ==
Elevations range from 1,440 feet (440 m) to 1,947 feet (593 m) and consists of 9,800 acres (4,000 ha) in a single parcel located 41°43′23″N 79°13′9″W.

== Biology ==
Hunting and trapping species include bear, (Ursus americanus), rabbit (Silvilagus floridanus), Coyote (Canis latrans), deer (Odocoileus virginianus), Gray fox (Urocyon cinereoargenteus), red fox (Vulpes vulpes), Ruffed grouse (Bonasa umbellus), Snowshoe hare (Lepus americanus), Eastern gray squirrel (Sciurus carolinensis), Fox squirrel (Sciurus niger), American red squirrel (Tamiasciurus hudsonicus) and Wild turkey (Meleagris vison). Birdwatchers may observe Northern goshawk (Accipiter gentilis), Ovenbird (Seiurus aurocapilla), Scarlet tanager (Piranga olivacea), Wood thrush (Hylocichla mustelina), blue-headed vireo (vireo solitarius), Red-eyed vireo (Vireo olivaceus), Blackburnian warbler (Setophaga fusca), Black-throated blue warbler (Setophaga caerulescens) and Black-throated green warbler (Setophaga virens).

== See also ==
Pennsylvania State Game Lands
