= Pennsylvania State Game Lands Number 38 =

Park in the United States

- Location within Pennsylvania Location within the United States
- Location: Monroe County
- Coordinates: 41°1′56″N 75°24′39″W
- Area: 5,577 acres (2,257 ha)
- Elevation: 1,926 feet (587 m)
- Max. elevation: 2,124 feet (647 m)
- Min. elevation: 1,140 feet (350 m)
- Owner: Pennsylvania Game Commission

The Pennsylvania State Game Lands Number 38 are Pennsylvania State Game Lands in Monroe County in Pennsylvania in the United States providing hunting, bird watching, and other activities.

== Geography ==
State Game Lands Number 38 is located in Chestnuthill, Jackson, Pocono and Tunkhannock Townships in Monroe County. The Game Lands shares border with Big Pocono State Park to the east. The Pohopco Mountains lie to the southwest. Other nearby recreational and protected areas include Pennsylvania State Game Lands Number 127 to the north, Pennsylvania State Game Lands Number 221 to the northeast, Pennsylvania State Game Lands Number 186 to the southeast, Pennsylvania State Game Lands Number 129 to the west and Pennsylvania State Game Lands Number 318 to the northwest.

== Statistics ==
SGL 38 was entered into the Geographic Names Information System on 1 March 1990 as identification number 1208052, elevation is listed as 1,926 feet (587 m).
