= Pennsylvania State Game Lands Number 39 =

Park in the United States

- Location within Pennsylvania Location within the United States
- Location: Venango County
- Coordinates: 41°15′53″N 79°52′35″W; 41°18′55″N 79°56′43″W
- Area: 10,868 acres (4,398 ha)
- Elevation: 1,211 feet (369 m)
- Max. elevation: 1,552 feet (473 m)
- Min. elevation: 1,040 feet (320 m)
- Owner: Pennsylvania Game Commission

The Pennsylvania State Game Lands Number 39 are Pennsylvania State Game Lands in Venango County in Pennsylvania in the United States providing hunting, bird watching, and other activities.

== Geography ==
State Game Lands Number 39 is located in Clinton, Frenchcreek, Irwin, Mineral, Sandycreek and Victory Townships in Venango County. Pennsylvania State Game Lands Number 130 is located to the west.

== Statistics ==
SGL 39 was entered into the Geographic Names Information System on 1 March 1990 as identification number 1208054, elevation is listed as 1,211 feet (369 m).
