= Pennsylvania State Game Lands Number 51 =

Park in the United States

- Location within Pennsylvania Location within the United States
- Location: Fayette County, Pennsylvania: Connellsville Township; Dunbar Township; Springfield Township; Stewart Township; Wharton Township
- Coordinates: 39°56′N 79°33′W
- Area: 16,945 acres (6,857 hectares)
- Max. elevation: 2,122 feet (647 m)
- Owner: Pennsylvania Game Commission

Pennsylvania State Game Lands Number 51 are Pennsylvania State Game Lands in Fayette County, Pennsylvania
