= Pennsylvania State Game Lands Number 247 =

Park in the United States

- Location within Pennsylvania Location within the United States
- Location: Armstrong County
- Nearest town: Cadogan, McHadden, North Buffalo, Sistersville, West Ford City
- Coordinates: 40°46′18″N 79°34′18″W
- Area: 452.3 acres (183.0 ha)
- Elevation: 1,073 feet (327 m)
- Max. elevation: 1,300 feet (400 m)
- Min. elevation: 900 feet (270 m)
- Owner: Pennsylvania Game Commission

The Pennsylvania State Game Lands Number 247 are Pennsylvania State Game Lands in Armstrong County in Pennsylvania in the United States providing hunting, bird watching, and other activities.

== Geography ==
SGL 247 consists of a single parcel located in North Buffalo Township. It lies in the watershed of the Allegheny River, part of the Ohio River watershed. Nearby communities include populated places Cadogan, McHadden, North Buffalo, Sistersville, and West Ford City. Pennsylvania Route 28 runs to the northwest of SGL 247, Pennsylvania Route 128 runs to the southwest.

== Statistics ==
SGL 247 was entered into the Geographic Names Information System on 2 August 1979 as identification number 1208344, its elevation is listed as 1,073 feet (327 m). Elevations range from 900 feet (270 m) to 1,300 feet (400 m). It consists of 452.3 acres (183.0 ha) in one parcel.

== Biology ==
Hunting and furtaking species include bear (Ursus americanus), Bobcat (Lynx rufus), Coyote (Canis latrans), deer (Odocoileus virginianus), Gray fox (Urocyon cinereoargenteus), Red fox (Vulpes vulpes), grouse (Bonasa umbellus), mink (Neovison vison), Raccoon (Procyoon lotor), squirrel (Sciurus carolinensis), and turkey (Meleagris gallopavo). The habitat management goal of SGL 137 is to favor requirements for deer and grouse, which coincides with the non-game focus for aspen stands, interior forest conditions as well as forested riparian areas. In addition, management activities will consider species of concern such as bats (Order Chiroptera), Chimney swift (Chaetura pelagica), Louisiana waterthrush (Parkesia motacilla), and Cerulean warbler (Setophaga cerulea).

== See also ==
- Pennsylvania State Game Lands
- Pennsylvania State Game Lands Number 105, also located in Armstrong County
- Pennsylvania State Game Lands Number 137, also located in Armstrong County
- Pennsylvania State Game Lands Number 259, also located in Armstrong County
- Pennsylvania State Game Lands Number 287, also located in Armstrong County
