= Pennsylvania State Game Lands Number 37 =

Park in the United States

- Location within Pennsylvania Location within the United States
- Location: Tioga County
- Coordinates: 41°51′26″N 77°10′7″W; 41°53′4″N 77°5′22″W
- Area: 8,858.32 acres (3,584.83 ha)
- Elevation: 1,631 feet (497 m)
- Max. elevation: 2,290 feet (700 m)
- Min. elevation: 1,100 feet (340 m)
- Owner: Pennsylvania Game Commission

The Pennsylvania State Game Lands Number 37 (SGL 31) are Pennsylvania State Game Lands in Tioga County, Pennsylvania, United States, that provide hunting, bird watching, and other activities.

== Geography ==
State Game Lands Number 37 is located in Charleston, Middlebury, Richmond, Rutland and Tioga Townships, in Tioga County. Nearby recreational and protected areas include Cowanesque Lake to the north, Smythe Park to the southeast in Mansfield, and Hills Creek State Park to the southwest.

== Statistics ==
SGL 37 was entered into the Geographic Names Information System on 1 March 1990 as identification number 1208053, elevation is listed as 1,631 feet (497 m).
