= Pennsylvania State Game Lands Number 148 =

Park in the United States

- Location within Pennsylvania Location within the United States
- Location: Lawrence and Beaver Counties, Pennsylvania
- Nearest city: Ellwood City
- Coordinates: 40°51′43″N 80°21′14″W
- Area: 575 acres (233 ha)
- Elevation: 1,234 feet (376 m)
- Owner: Pennsylvania Game Commission
- Website: www.pgc.pa.gov/HuntTrap/StateGameLands/Documents/SGL%20Maps/SGL__148.pdf

The Pennsylvania State Game Lands Number 148 are Pennsylvania State Game Lands in Lawrence and Beaver Counties in Pennsylvania in the United States providing hunting, bird watching, cross-country skiing, and other activities.

== Geography ==
The Game Lands consists of two parcels located just a few miles west of Ellwood City. Located in New Beaver borough and Wayne Township in Lawrence County, with a small portion in the borough of Big Beaver in Beaver County. Other nearby populated places are Chewton, Coverdale, Possum Hollow, and Wampum.

== Statistics ==
SGL 148 consists of approximately 575 acres (233 ha) in two parcels and was entered into the Geographic Names Information System as identification number 1188452 on 2 August 1979; its elevation is listed as 1,234 feet (376 m).It falls within the 16157 United States Postal Service zip code.

== Biology ==
Game Lands 148 is 95% forested with most of the forest cover red oak (Quercus) along with aspen (Populus tremuloides), beech (Fagus), black cherry (Prunus serotina), maple (Acer), spruce (Picea), and tuliptree (Liriodendron tulipifera). Fur and game includes coyote (Canis latrans), white-tailed deer (Odocoileus virginianus), gray fox (Urocyon cinereoargenteus), red fox (Vulpes Vulpes), ruffed grouse (Bonasa umbellus), pheasant (Phasianus cochicus), raccoon (Procyon lotor), gray squirrel, (Sciurus carolinensis), and wild turkey (Meleagris gallopavo).

== See also ==
- Pennsylvania State Game Lands
- Pennsylvania State Game Lands Number 173, also located in Beaver County
- Pennsylvania State Game Lands Number 189, also located in Beaver County
- Pennsylvania State Game Lands Number 285, also located in Beaver County
