= Pennsylvania State Game Lands Number 259 =

Park in the United States

- Location within Pennsylvania Location within the United States
- Location: Armstrong County
- Nearest town: Worthington
- Coordinates: 40°54′29″N 79°37′59″W
- Area: 351.66 acres (142.31 ha)
- Elevation: 1,266 feet (386 m)
- Max. elevation: 1,480 feet (450 m)
- Min. elevation: 1,180 feet (360 m)
- Owner: Pennsylvania Game Commission
- Website: www.pgc.pa.gov/HuntTrap/StateGameLands/Documents/SGL%20Maps/SGL__259.pdf

The Pennsylvania State Game Lands Number 259 are Pennsylvania State Game Lands in Armstrong County in Pennsylvania in the United States providing hunting, bird watching, and other activities.

== Geography ==
SGL 259 consists of a single parcel located in Sugarcreek and West Franklin Townships. It lies in the watershed of the Allegheny River, part of the Ohio River watershed. Nearby communities include the Borough of Worthington and populated places Adams, Browns Crossroads, Buffalo Mills, Cowansville, Craigsville, Fosters Mills, Frogtown, Greenville, Laird Crossing, Nichola, Rattigan, Shadyside Village, Sherrett, and Somerville. U.S. Route 422 runs northwest/southeast to the south, Pennsylvania Route 268 runs north/south to the east of SGL 259.

== Statistics ==
SGL 259 was entered into the Geographic Names Information System on 2 August 1979 as identification number 1208336, its elevation is listed as 1,266 feet (386 m). Elevations range from 1,180 feet (360 m) to 1,480 feet (450 m). It consists of 351.66 acres (142.31 ha) in one parcel.

== Biology ==
Although Black bear (Ursus americanus) inhabit this area it is not often pursued. Other hunting and furtaking species include Coyote (Canis latrans), deer (Odocoileus virginianus), Gray fox (Urocyon cinereoargenteus), Red fox (Vulpes vulpes), grouse (Bonasa umbellus), mink (Neovison vison), Raccoon (Procyoon lotor), squirrel (Sciurus carolinensis), and turkey (Meleagris gallopavo).

== See also ==
- Pennsylvania State Game Lands
- Pennsylvania State Game Lands Number 105, also located in Armstrong County
- Pennsylvania State Game Lands Number 137, also located in Armstrong County
- Pennsylvania State Game Lands Number 247, also located in Armstrong County
- Pennsylvania State Game Lands Number 287, also located in Armstrong County
