= Pennsylvania State Game Lands Number 35 =

Park in the United States

- Location within Pennsylvania Location within the United States
- Location: Susquehanna County
- Coordinates: 41°55′53″N 75°41′51″W
- Area: 7,772 acres (3,145 ha)
- Elevation: 1,686 feet (514 m)
- Max. elevation: 1,866 feet (569 m)
- Min. elevation: 880 feet (270 m)
- Owner: Pennsylvania Game Commission

The Pennsylvania State Game Lands Number 35 are Pennsylvania State Game Lands in Susquehanna County in Pennsylvania in the United States providing hunting, bird watching, and other activities.

== Geography ==
State Game Lands Number 35 is located in Great Bend, Harmony, Jackson and New Milford Townships in Susquehanna County. Maunatome Mountain (summit elevation 1,602 feet (488 m)) is located just outside of the Game Lands to the northwest. Other nearby protected areas include Pennsylvania State Game Lands Number 70 to the northwest, Pennsylvania State Game Lands Number 175 close by to the southwest and Salt Springs State Park to the west.

== Statistics ==
SGL 35 was entered into the Geographic Names Information System on 1 March 1990 as identification number 1208052, elevation is listed as 1,883 feet (574 m).
