= Pennsylvania State Game Lands Number 189 =

Park in the United States

- Location within Pennsylvania Location within the United States
- Location: Beaver County, Pennsylvania
- Nearest city: Mechanicsburg
- Coordinates: 40°31′41″N 80°21′50″W; 40°30′36″N 80°29′11″W
- Area: 415.3 acres (168.1 ha)
- Elevation: 1,220 feet (370 m)
- Owner: Pennsylvania Game Commission

The Pennsylvania State Game Lands Number 189 are Pennsylvania State Game Lands in Beaver County in Pennsylvania in the United States providing hunting, bird watching, cross-country skiing, and other activities.

== Geography ==
SGL 189 consists of two parcels. The larger parcel is located partially in Hanover Township and partially in Independence Township. The smaller parcel, 6.2 acres (2.5 ha) in extant is about 6.5 miles (10.5 km) west of the main parcel, located adjacent to the western edge of Raccoon Creek State Park also in Hanover Township. The Game Lands falls within the Raccoon Creek watershed which is part of the Ohio River watershed. U.S. Route 30 passes along the southwest border of the main parcel and Pennsylvania Route 168 passes within 0.5 miles (0.80 km) of the small parcel.

== Statistics ==
SGL 189 consists of 415.3 acres (168.1 ha) in two parcels and was entered into the Geographic Names Information System as identification number 1212723 on 2 November 1979; its elevation is listed as 1,220 feet (370 m). It falls within the 15026 United States Postal Service zip code.

== Biology ==
Game Lands 189 is 94% forested, the topography is rolling, elevations range from 920 feet (280 m) to 1,220 feet (370 m) and tends toward steeper around the streams. Hunting and furtaking species include coyote (Canis latrans), white-tailed deer (Odocoileus virginianus), gray fox (Urocyon cinereoargenteus), red fox (Vulpes Vulpes), ruffed grouse (Bonasa umbellus), mink (Neovison vison), muskrat (Ondatra zibethicus), Ring-necked pheasant (Phasianus colchicus), raccoon (Procyon lotor), gray squirrel, (Sciurus carolinensis), wild turkey (Meleagris gallopavo). An occasional bear (Ursus americanus) has been seen in the area.

== See also ==
- Pennsylvania State Game Lands
- Pennsylvania State Game Lands Number 148, also located in Beaver County
- Pennsylvania State Game Lands Number 173, also located in Beaver County
- Pennsylvania State Game Lands Number 285, also located in Beaver County
