= Pennsylvania State Game Lands Number 40 =

Park in the United States

- Location within Pennsylvania Location within the United States
- Location: Carbon County
- Coordinates: 41°4′10″N 75°42′52″W
- Area: 6,202 acres (2,510 ha)
- Elevation: 1,529 feet (466 m)
- Max. elevation: 1,881 feet (573 m)
- Min. elevation: 1,300 feet (400 m)
- Owner: Pennsylvania Game Commission

The Pennsylvania State Game Lands Number 40 are Pennsylvania State Game Lands in Carbon County in Pennsylvania in the United States providing hunting, bird watching, and other activities.

== Geography ==
State Game Lands Number 40 is located in Kidder Township in Carbon County, Pennsylvania. The Game Lands shares a common border with Hickory Run State Park to the south and with Pennsylvania State Game Lands Number 149 to the southwest. Other nearby recreational and protected areas are Pennsylvania State Game Lands Number 91 to the north, Pennsylvania State Game Lands Number 129 to the east, Pennsylvania State Game Lands Number 141 and Weiser State Forest to the southeast, Lehigh Gorge State Park to the south, Pennsylvania State Game Lands Number 187 and Nescopeck State Park to the west, and Pennsylvania State Game Lands Number 119 to the northwest.

== Statistics ==
SGL 40 was entered into the Geographic Names Information System on 2 August 1979 as identification number 1188513, elevation is listed as 1,211 feet (369 m).
