= Pennsylvania State Game Lands Number 173 =

Park in the United States

- Location within Pennsylvania Location within the United States
- Location: Beaver County, Pennsylvania
- Nearest city: Ohioville
- Coordinates: 40°40′19″N 80°28′6″W
- Area: 575 acres (233 ha)
- Elevation: 1,234 feet (376 m)
- Owner: Pennsylvania Game Commission
- Website: www.pgc.pa.gov/HuntTrap/StateGameLands/Documents/SGL%20Maps/SGL__148.pdf

The Pennsylvania State Game Lands Number 148 are Pennsylvania State Game Lands in Beaver County in Pennsylvania in the United States providing hunting, hiking, bird watching, wildlife photography and other activities.

== Geography ==
Most of the Game Lands is located in Ohioville Borough with a small portion of the eastern end located in Industry Borough. Other nearby communities are Glasgow, Midland and Shippingport Boroughs, and populated places Fairview, Five Points, and Smiths Ferry.

== Statistics ==
SGL 173 consists of 1,063 acres (430 ha) in one parcel and was entered into the Geographic Names Information System as identification number 1205937 on 1 November 1989; its elevation is listed as 1,207 feet (368 m). It falls within the 15052 United States Postal Service zip code.

== Biology ==
Game Lands 173 offers hunting and furtaking for beaver (Castor canadensis), Coyote (Canis latrans), White-tailed deer (Odocoileus virginianus), Gray fox (Urocyon cinereoargenteus), Red fox (Vulpes Vulpes), Ruffed grouse (Bonasa umbellus), mink (Neovison vison), Muskrat (Ondatra zibethicus), Raccoon (Procyon lotor), squirrel (Sciurus carolinensis), turkey (Meleagris gallopavo) and possibly Bobcat (Lynx rufus). Non-game birds of special concern in SGL 173 are Scarlet tanager (Piranga olivacea), Cerulean warbler (Setophaga cerulean), and Kentucky warbler (Geothlypis Formosa).

== See also ==
- Pennsylvania State Game Lands
- Pennsylvania State Game Lands Number 148, also located in Beaver County
- Pennsylvania State Game Lands Number 189, also located in Beaver County
- Pennsylvania State Game Lands Number 285, also located in Beaver County
