= Pennsylvania State Game Lands Number 285 =

Protected area in Pennsylvania, US

- Location within Pennsylvania
- Location: Beaver County, Pennsylvania
- Nearest city: East Palestine, Ohio
- Coordinates: 40°48′7″N 80°30′0″W
- Area: 2,840.4 acres (1,149.5 ha)
- Elevation: 1,221 feet (372 m)
- Owner: Pennsylvania Game Commission
- Website: www.pgc.pa.gov/HuntTrap/StateGameLands/Documents/SGL%20Maps/SGL__285.pdf

The Pennsylvania State Game Lands Number 285 are Pennsylvania State Game Lands in Beaver County in Pennsylvania in the United States providing hunting, bird watching, cross-country skiing, and other activities.

== Geography ==
SGL 285 consists of three parcels. The southernmost parcel is located in South Beaver Township, the other two parcels are located in Darlington Township. The Game Lands falls within the watershed of Little Beaver Creek and its tributaries which is part of the Ohio River watershed. Pennsylvania Route 51 passes nearby to the east of the parcels, Pennsylvania Route 251 passes to the south, and an Ohio and Pennsylvania rail line passes between the central and southern portions. The southern parcel touches the border between Pennsylvania and Ohio.

== Statistics ==
SGL 189 consists of 2,840.4 acres (1,149.5 ha) in three parcels, its highest elevation is 1,221 feet (372 m).

== Biology ==
Hunting and furtaking species include North American beaver (Castor canadensis), coyote (Canis latrans), white-tailed deer (Odocoileus virginianus), Mallard (Anas platyrhynchos) and other dabbling ducks, Wood duck (Aix sponsa), gray fox (Urocyon cinereoargenteus), red fox (Vulpes Vulpes), ruffed grouse (Bonasa umbellus), mink (Neovison vison), Ring-necked pheasant (Phasianus colchicus), raccoon (Procyon lotor), rabbit (Sylvilagus floridanus), gray squirrel, (Sciurus carolinensis), wild turkey (Meleagris gallopavo). North Fork Little Beaver Creek is an approved trout stream for fishing opportunities.

== See also ==
- Pennsylvania State Game Lands
- Pennsylvania State Game Lands Number 148, also located in Beaver County
- Pennsylvania State Game Lands Number 173, also located in Beaver County
- Pennsylvania State Game Lands Number 189, also located in Beaver County
