= Pennsylvania State Game Lands Number 42 =

Park in the United States

- Location within Pennsylvania Location within the United States
- Location: Cambria County; Somerset County; Westmoreland County
- Coordinates: 40°13′49″N 79°6′25″W; 40°14′59″N 79°3′52″W; 40°20′38″N 79°0′34″W; 40°22′13″N 79°5′32″W
- Area: 15,625 acres (6,323 ha)
- Elevation: 2,566 feet (782 m); 2,034 feet (620 m)
- Max. elevation: 2,911 feet (887 m)
- Min. elevation: 1,020 feet (310 m)
- Owner: Pennsylvania Game Commission

The Pennsylvania State Game Lands Number 42 are Pennsylvania State Game Lands in Cambria, Somerset and Westmoreland Counties in Pennsylvania in the United States providing hunting, bird watching, and other activities.

== Geography ==
State Game Lands Number 42 is located in Jackson, Lower Yoder, Upper Yoder and West Taylor Townships in Cambria County, in Conemaugh and Jenner Townships in Somerset County, and in Fairfield, Ligonier and St Clair Townships in Westmoreland County.

== Statistics ==
SGL 42 was entered into the Geographic Names Information System on 2 August 1979 as identification number 1193452, elevation is listed as 2,566 feet (782 m) and entered also as identification number 1209274 on 1 October 1992, elevation listed as 2,034 feet (620 m).
