= Pennsylvania State Game Lands Number 45 =

Park in the United States

- Location within Pennsylvania Location within the United States
- Location: Clarion County; Venango County
- Coordinates: 41°19′9″N 79°41′43″W; 41°19′22″N 79°37′0″W; 41°19′44″N 79°34′37″W
- Area: 5,226.83 acres (2,115.22 ha)
- Elevation: 1,404 feet (428 m)
- Max. elevation: 1,598 feet (487 m)
- Min. elevation: 1,100 feet (340 m)
- Owner: Pennsylvania Game Commission

The Pennsylvania State Game Lands Number 45 are Pennsylvania State Game Lands in Clarion and Venango Counties in Pennsylvania in the United States providing hunting, bird watching, and other activities.

== Geography ==
State Game Lands Number 45 is located in Ashland Township in Clarion County, and in Cranberry, Pinegrove and Rockland Townships in Venango County.

== Statistics ==
SGL 45 was entered into the Geographic Names Information System on 2 August 1979 as identification number 1193453, elevation is listed as 1,404 feet (428 m).
