= Pennsylvania State Game Lands =

Protected area in Pennsylvania, US

The Pennsylvania State Game Lands (SGL) are lands managed by the Pennsylvania Game Commission (PGC) for hunting, trapping, and fishing. These lands, often not usable for farming or development, are donated to the PGC or purchased by the PGC with hunting license money.

The Pennsylvania Game Commission runs a monthly publication called the Pennsylvania Game News. This publication features financial and legislative updates from the PGC, stories, and monthly Field Notes submitted by the Wildlife Conservation Officers of the Pennsylvania Game Commission.

== History ==
Wild game animals have been hunted for thousands of years in what is now Pennsylvania, first by the Indigenous peoples of the Americas, later by Europeans. Until the arrival of Europeans, such hunting was not recreational, but exclusively for the purpose of food. By 1890 game had practically disappeared from Pennsylvania. That year, John M. Phillips and other sportsmen, recognizing the scarcity of game, formed the Pennsylvania Sportsmen's Association so that they could press the state government for protection of wildlife. This resulted in the formation of the Pennsylvania Game Commission. New game laws were enacted by the General Assembly in 1897 to protect populations of deer, elk, waterfowl and game birds.

The Commission appointed the first game protectors and empowered constables to enforce the new laws. Game Commissioner Joseph Kalbus remarked that Pennsylvania hunters, "appeared to think they had...an inherent right to destroy game and birds at pleasure." Pennsylvanians, like other Americans resisted efforts to limit hunting to protect the game. In 1906 alone, fourteen protectors were shot at and three were killed. In 1905 Governor Samuel Pennypacker authorized the Commission to establish 'game preserves' in state forests to protect deer, Wild turkey, Grouse, Woodcock, and other animals. The first was on 2,000 acres (810 ha) in Clinton County.

In 1913, by act of the General Assembly, passing the Resident Hunter's License Law, the Commission began to charge one dollar for each hunting license, which provided funding to purchase additional lands for hunting.

The Commonwealth had twenty game preserves but the game population was still extremely low, so Pennsylvania restocked the Game Lands with game from other states and Canada. Today, the Commission has set aside almost 1.5 million acres (610 thousand hectares) as State Game Lands.

== List of State Game Lands ==
For Game Lands containing more than one parcel, coordinate given is for a point central to the array of parcels.

| Number | GNIS ID | County | Tracts | Area* | Coordinates | Elevation | Quad Map |
|---|---|---|---|---|---|---|---|
| 12 | 1193432 | Bradford; Sullivan | 2 | 24,480 acres (9,910 ha) | 41°37′18″N 76°42′47″W | 2,034 feet (620 m) | Shunk |
| 13 | 1199594 | Sullivan | 1 | 49,528.72 acres (20,043.56 ha) | 41°22′0″N 76°22′30″W | 2,201 feet (671 m) | Sonestown |
| 14 | 1199597 | Cameron; Elk | 1 | 14,947 acres (6,049 ha) | 41°25′50″N 78°21′18″W | 1,749 feet (533 m) | West Creek |
| 24 | 1210214 | Clarion; Forest | 1 | 8,500 acres (3,400 ha) | 41°26′14″N 79°16′15″W | 1,572 feet (479 m) | Tylersburg |
| 25 | 1210215 | Elk | 2 | 24,117 acres (9,760 ha) | 41°29′39″N 78°35′42″W | 1,998 feet (609 m) | Glen Hazel |
| 26 | 1188508 | Bedford; Blair; Cambria; Somerset | 2 | 12,346 acres (4,996 ha) | 40°31′6″N 78°37′23″W | 2,628 feet (801 m) | Beaverdale |
| 28 | 1199600 | Elk; Forest | 1 | 11,257.42 acres (4,555.72 ha) | 41°26′46″N 78°56′12″W | 1,755 feet (535 m) | Hallton |
| 29 | 1210216 | Warren | 1 | 9,800 acres (4,000 ha) | 41°43′23″N 79°13′9″W | 1,883 feet (574 m) | Cobham |
| 30 | 1208051 | McKean | 1 | 11,604 acres (4,696 ha) | 41°38′22″N 78°20′29″W | 2,300 feet (700 m) | Norwich |
| 31 | 1188510 | Jefferson | 1 | 5,175.63 acres (2,094.50 ha) | 41°2′17″N 79°1′5″W | 1,824 feet (556 m) | Coolspring |
| 33 | 1193450 | Centre | 1 | 17,583 acres (7,116 ha) | 40°49′38″N 78°10′41″W | 2,198 feet (670 m) | Sandy Ridge |
| 34 | 1188511 | Clearfield | 5 | 10,248 acres (4,147 ha) | 41°14′9″N 78°20′41″W | 2,021 feet (616 m) | The Knobs |
| 35 | 1208052 | Susquehanna | 1 | 7,772 acres (3,145 ha) | 41°55′53″N 75°41′19″W | 1,686 feet (514 m) | Great Bend |
| 36 | 1188512 | Bradford | 3 | 18,870 acres (7,640 ha) | 41°38′0″N 76°32′43″W | 1,762 feet (537 m) | Powell |
| 37 | 1208053 | Tioga | 3 | 8,858.32 acres (3,584.83 ha) | 41°51′41″N 77°8′2″W | 1,631 feet (497 m) | Tioga |
| 38 | 1193451 | Monroe | 1 | - | 41°2′56″N 75°24′39″W | 1,926 feet (587 m) | Pocono Pines |
| 39 | 1208054 | Venango | 2 | 10,868 acres (4,398 ha) | 41°18′31″N 79°55′48″W | 1,211 feet (369 m) | Polk |
| 40 | 1188513 | Carbon | 1 | 6,202 acres (2,510 ha) | 41°4′10″N 75°42′52″W | 1,670 feet (510 m) | Hickory Run |
| 41 | 1188514 | Bedford | 2 | 2,618 acres (1,059 ha) | 40°14′49″N 78°25′0″W | 1,529 feet (466 m) | New Enterprise |
| 42 | 1209274; 1193452 | Cambria; Somerset; Westmoreland | 4 | 15,625 acres (6,323 ha) | 40°18′8″N 79°4′4″W | 2,566 feet (782 m); 2,034 feet (620 m) | Boswell; Vintondale |
| 43 | 1188515 | Berks; Chester | 3 | 2,545 acres (1,030 ha) | 40°10′33″N 75°46′51″W | 843 feet (257 m) | Elverson |
| 44 | 1210008 | Elk | 7 | 39,400 acres (15,900 ha) | 41°21′28″N 78°45′1″W | 1,919 feet (585 m) | Carman |
| 45 | 1193453 | Clarion; Venango | 2 | 5,226.83 acres (2,115.22 ha) | 41°35′5″N 79°36′38″W | 1,404 feet (428 m) | Cranberry |
| 46 | 1193454 | Lancaster; Lebanon | 1 | 6,254 acres (2,531 ha) | 40°15′2″N 76°15′39″W | 837 feet (255 m) | Lititz |
| 47 | 1199601 | Venango | 1 | 2,214 acres (896 ha) | 41°25′56″N 79°36′27″W | 1,558 feet (475 m) | President |
| 48 | 1193455 | Bedford | 2 | 11,093 acres (4,489 ha) | 39°54′14″N 78°37′52″W | 1,893 feet (577 m) | Buffalo Mills |
| 49 | 1193456 | Bedford; Fulton | 5 | 6,393 acres (2,587 ha) | 39°49′29″N 78°18′43″W | 1,204 feet (367 m) | Amaranth |
| 50 | 1193457 | Somerset | 1 | 3,256.187 acres (1,317.732 ha) | 39°57′35″N 79°3′44″W | 2,260 feet (690 m) | Murdock |
| 51 | 1193458 | Fayette | 1 | 16,853.8 acres (6,820.5 ha) | 39°55′9″N 79°40′51″W | 2,100 feet (640 m) | South Connellsville |
| 52 | 1193459 | Berks; Lancaster | 2 | 2,463 acres (997 ha) | 40°11′18″N 75°56′57″W | 679 feet (207 m) | Morgantown |
| 53 | 1188516 | Fulton | 1 | 5,901 acres (2,388 ha) | 39°55′16″N 78°3′30″W | 1,604 feet (489 m) | Meadow Grounds |
| 54 | 1210009 | Jefferson | 1 | 19,160 acres (7,750 ha) | 41°18′28″N 78°51′59″W | 1,808 feet (551 m) | Munderf |
| 55 | 1208055 | Columbia | 1 | 2,509 acres (1,015 ha) | 41°6′29″N 76°18′1″W | 1,608 feet (490 m) | Mifflinville |
| 56 | 1188517 | Bucks | 7 | 1,787.1 acres (723.2 ha) | 40°32′6″N 75°7′48″W | 728 feet (222 m) | Riegelsville |
| 57 | 1199986 | Luzerne; Wyoming | 2 | 45,986 acres (18,610 ha) | 41°25′9″N 76°9′6″W | 2,136 feet (651 m) | Lopez |
| 58 | 1208050 | Columbia | 2 | 12,646 acres (5,118 ha) | 40°56′30″N 76°20′47″W | 1,890 feet (580 m) | Shumans |
| 59 | 1188518 | McKean; Potter | 2 | 7,024 acres (2,843 ha) | 41°50′19″N 78°10′27″W | 2,372 feet (723 m) | Roulette |
| 60 | 1188519 | Blair; Cambria; Centre | 2 | 8,764 acres (3,547 ha) | 40°45′53″N 78°20′19″W | 2,470 feet (750 m) | Tipton |
| 61 | 1188520 | McKean | 4 | 9,886 acres (4,001 ha) | 41°45′49″N 78°18′43″W | 2,067 feet (630 m) | Port Allegany |
| 62 | 1188521; 1210468 | McKean | 1 | 9,178 acres (3,714 ha) | 41°45′57″N 78°34′12″W | 2,155 feet (657 m); 2,031 feet (619 m) | Hazel Hurst; Lewis Run |
| 63 | 1188522 | Clarion | 2 | 3,533 acres (1,430 ha) | 41°14′17″N 79°27′52″W | 1,230 feet (370 m) | Clarion |
| 64 | 1188523 | Potter | 2 | 8,057 acres (3,261 ha) | 41°46′3″N 77°38′4″W | 2,103 feet (641 m) | West Pike |
| 65 | 1188524 | Fulton | 1 | 6,000.71 acres (2,428.40 ha) | 39°54′3″N 78°12′43″W | 1,716 feet (523 m) | Needmore |
| 66 | 1199602 | Sullivan; Wyoming | 4 | 8,107 acres (3,281 ha) | 41°28′33″N 76°16′54″W | 2,028 feet (618 m) | Lopez |
| 67 | 1188525 | Huntingdon | 1 | 5,769 acres (2,335 ha) | 40°14′32″N 78°9′45″W | 2,060 feet (630 m) | Saxton |
| 68 | 1199603 | Lycoming | 1 | 3,921.88 acres (1,587.13 ha) | 41°28′58″N 77°27′57″W | 1,932 feet (589 m) | Cammal |
| 69 | 1188526 | Crawford | 2 | 4,496 acres (1,819 ha) | 41°38′40″N 79°53′13″W | 1,634 feet (498 m) | Townville |
| 70 | 1188527 | Susquehanna; Wayne | 2 | 6,363 acres (2,575 ha) | 41°58′9″N 75°28′45″W | 1,729 feet (527 m) | Starrucca |
| 71 | 1188528 | Huntingdon | 2 | 5,204 acres (2,106 ha) | 40°21′28″N 77°56′22″W | 2,142 feet (653 m) | Butler Knob |
| 72 | 1188529 | Clarion | 1 | 2,027 acres (820 ha) | 41°14′48″N 79°22′38″W | 1,437 feet (438 m) | Clarion |
| 73 | 1188530 | Bedford; Blair; Huntingdon | 7 | 20,814 acres (8,423 ha) | 40°13′31″N 78°17′29″W | 1,919 feet (585 m) | Everett East |
| 74 | 1188531 | Clarion; Jefferson | 3 | 6,499.12 acres (2,630.10 ha) | 41°13′47″N 78°45′8″W | 1,398 feet (426 m) | Strattanville |
| 75 | 1199604 | Lycoming | 2 | 27,505 acres (11,131 ha) | 41°27′59″N 77°19′40″W | 1,611 feet (491 m) | English Center |
| 76 | 1188532 | Franklin | 1 | 4,328 acres (1,751 ha) | 40°5′25″N 77°44′39″W | 988 feet (301 m) | Roxbury |
| 77 | 1188533 | Clearfield | 1 | 3,038 acres (1,229 ha) | 41°10′4″N 78°45′50″W | 1,635 feet (498 m) | Glenshaw |
| 78 | 1188534 | Clearfield | 1 | 717 acres (290 ha) | 40°59′27″N 78°15′17″W | 1,621 feet (494 m) | Philipsburg |
| 79 | 1188535 | Cambria; Indiana | 8 | 10,593 acres (4,287 ha) | 40°29′33″N 78°53′28″W | 1,713 feet (522 m) | Vintondale |
| 80 | 1188536; 1205691 | Berks; Lebanon; Schuylkill | 5 | 11,252 acres (4,554 ha) | 40°30′23″N 76°23′35″W | 768 feet (234 m) | Indiantown Gap |
| 81 | 1193460 | Fulton; Huntingdon | 2 | 3,931 acres (1,591 ha) | 40°7′12″N 77°55′13″W | 1,319 feet (402 m) | Friedensburg |
| 82 | 1190994 | Somerset | 2 | 6,775.213 acres (2,741.831 ha) | 39°48′25″N 78°54′18″W | 2,323 feet (708 m) | Wittenberg |
| 83 | 1208049 | York | 1 | 788 acres (319 ha) | 39°52′26″N 76°24′1″W | 732 feet (223 m) | Airville |
| 84 | 1199605 | Northumberland; Schuylkill | 2 | 8,940 acres (3,620 ha) | 40°44′46″N 76°36′44″W | 988 feet (301 m) | Valley View |
| 85 | 1188537 | Crawford | 1 | 115 acres (47 ha) | 41°48′19″N 79°58′51″W | 1,142 feet (348 m) | Millers Station |
| 86 | 1210010 | Warren | 1 | 14,320 acres (5,800 ha) | 41°45′14″N 79°20′30″W | 1,742 feet (531 m) | Cobham |
| 87 | 1188538 | Clearfield | 4 | 10,613 acres (4,295 ha) | 40°57′40″N 78°45′4″W | 1,854 feet (565 m) | Mahaffey |
| 88 | 1188539 | Juniata; Perry | 1 | 6,930 acres (2,800 ha) | 40°26′30″N 77°27′17″W | 1,237 feet (377 m) | McCoysville |
| 89 | 1188540 | Clinton | 1 | 10,571.2 acres (4,278.0 ha) | 41°15′45″N 77°30′27″W | 1,329 feet (405 m) | Farrandsville |
| 90 | 1193461 | Clearfield | 1 | 3,957 acres (1,601 ha) | 41°6′17″N 78°27′6″W | 1,873 feet (571 m) | Clearfield |
| 91 | 1208048 | Carbon; Lackawanna; Luzerne | 4 | 21,137 acres (8,554 ha) | 41°12′27″N 75°42′1″W | 1,896 feet (578 m) | Pleasant View Summit |
| 92 | 1188541 | Centre | 1 | 5,278.719 acres (2,136.222 ha) | 41°0′27″N 77°44′27″W | 1,033 feet (315 m) | Bellefonte |
| 93 | 1190995 | Somerset | 3 | 2,945 acres (1,192 ha) | 40°5′51″N 78°51′48″W | 1,437 feet (438 m) | Penfield |
| 94 | 1188542 | Clearfield | 1 | 2,298 acres (930 ha) | 41°9′36″N 78°23′3″W | 2,139 feet (652 m) | Huntley |
| 95 | 1188543 | Butler | 5 | 9,962.5 acres (4,031.7 ha) | 41°4′13″N 79°47′58″W | 1,207 feet (368 m) | West Sunbury |
| 96 | 1193462 | Venango | 6 | 4,972.8 acres (2,012.4 ha) | 41°32′46″N 79°48′52″W | 1,470 feet (450 m) | Dempseytown |
| 97 | 1193463 | Bedford | 1 | 7,612 acres (3,080 ha) | 39°55′43″N 78°27′20″W | 1,834 feet (559 m) | Clearville |
| 98 | 1208047 | Clearfield | 1 | 1,172 acres (474 ha) | 40°55′43″N 78°21′10″W | 1,896 feet (578 m) | Wallaceton |
| 99 | 1188544 | Huntingdon | 1 | 4,470 acres (1,810 ha) | 40°15′35″N 77°58′7″W | 2,044 feet (623 m) | Orbisonia |
| 100 | 1188427 | Centre; Clearfield | 2 | 21,054 acres (8,520 ha) | 41°6′59″N 78°2′53″W | 1,647 feet (502 m) | Karthaus |
| 101 | 1188428 | Crawford; Erie | 2 | 5,056.7 acres (2,046.4 ha) | 41°50′28″N 80°27′58″W | 965 feet (294 m) | Beaver Center |
| 102 | 1188429 | Erie | 1 | 384 acres (155 ha) | 41°56′13″N 79°48′23″W | 1,430 feet (440 m) | Union City |
| 103 | 1193428 | Centre | 1 | 8,993 acres (3,639 ha) | 40°58′3″N 77°54′31″W | 1,923 feet (586 m) | Bear Knob |
| 104 | 1193429 | Bedford; Somerset | 2 | 8,182 acres (3,311 ha) | 39°51′24″N 78°45′22″W | 2,247 feet (685 m) | New Baltimore |
| 105 | 1188430 | Armstrong | 3 | 3,068.65 acres (1,241.84 ha) | 40°59′14″N 79°35′48″W | 1,197 feet (365 m) | Chicora |
| 106 | 1190992 | Berks; Schuylkill; Lehigh | 2 | 9,720.847 acres (3,933.887 ha) | 40°37′47″N 75°57′6″W | 1,411 feet (430 m) | New Ringgold |
| 107 | 1193430 | Juniata; Mifflin | 1 | 8,254 acres (3,340 ha) | 40°38′37″N 77°24′50″W | 1,309 feet (399 m) | Alfarata |
| 108 | 1209259; 1188431 | Blair; Cambria | 4 | 23,131 acres (9,361 ha) | 40°39′11″N 78°30′52″W | Coalport; Hastings | |
| 109 | 1188432 | Erie | 2 | 1,973 acres (798 ha) | 41°59′25″N 79°59′16″W | 1,214 feet (370 m) | Waterford |
| 110 | 1208081 | Berks; Schuylkill | 1 | 10,130 acres (4,100 ha) | 40°32′11″N 76°7′15″W | 830 feet (250 m) | Auburn |
| 111 | 1188433 | Fayette; Somerset | 2 | 10,520 acres (4,260 ha) | 39°52′46″N 79°21′55″W | 2,313 feet (705 m) | Ohiopyle |
| 112 | 1188434 | Huntingdon; Mifflin | 4 | 6,441 acres (2,607 ha) | 40°28′6″N 77°53′33″W | 1,063 feet (324 m) | Donation |
| 113 | 1188435 | Mifflin | 2 | 523 acres (212 ha) | 40°33′6″N 77°41′19″W | 892 feet (272 m) | Belleville |
| 114 | 1199592 | Lycoming | 1 | 2,881.8 acres (1,166.2 ha) | 41°21′42″N 77°12′19″W | 1,601 feet (488 m) | Salladasburg |
| 115 | 1193431 | Northumberland; Montour | 1 | 1,844 acres (746 ha) | 40°57′31″N 76°41′33″W | 1,063 feet (324 m) | Riverside |
| 116 | 1199593 | Pike | 1 | 3,024 acres (1,224 ha) | 41°26′50″N 74°58′18″W | 1,220 feet (370 m) | Shohola |
| 117 | 1208045; 1990205 | Washington | 1 | 2,895 acres (1,172 ha) | 40°24′21″N 80°24′0″W | 1,125 feet (343 m); 958 feet (292 m) | Burgettstown; Clinton |
| 118 | 1188436 | Blair; Huntingdon | 3 | 6,133 acres (2,482 ha) | 40°29′5″N 78°9′11″W | 1,867 feet (569 m) | Williamsburg |
| 119 | 1208044 | Luzerne | 3 | 7,967 acres (3,224 ha) | 41°8′27″N 75°47′40″W | 1,621 feet (494 m) | Wilkes-Barre East |
| 120 | 1188437 | Cambria; Clearfield | 2 | 7,651 acres (3,096 ha) | 40°45′52″N 78°35′8″W | 1,975 feet (602 m) | Coalport |
| 121 | 1193433 | Fulton; Huntingdon | 1 | 2,234 acres (904 ha) | 40°10′39″N 78°4′6″W | 1,424 feet (434 m) | Saltillo |
| 122 | 1188438 | Crawford | 2 | 2,659 acres (1,076 ha) | 41°41′24″N 79°48′30″W | 1,270 feet (390 m) | Centerville |
| 123 | 1188439 | Bradford | 2 | 1,615 acres (654 ha) | 41°54′51″N 76°46′32″W | 1,693 feet (516 m) | Bentley Creek |
| 124 | 1193434 | Franklin; Fulton | 1 | 6,835 acres (2,766 ha) | 39°49′10″N 78°0′59″W | 1,184 feet (361 m) | Big Cove Tannery |
| 126 | 1188548 | Lycoming | 1 | 652.78 acres (264.17 ha) | 41°12′48″N 77°3′19″W | 991 feet (302 m) | Williamsport |
| 127 | 1188440 | Monroe | 3 | 29,039 acres (11,752 ha) | 41°10′50″N 75°25′15″W | 1,863 feet (568 m) | Tobyhanna |
| 128 | 1188441 | Fulton | 1 | 1,710 acres (690 ha) | 39°47′27″N 78°14′11″W | 820 feet (250 m) | Needmore |
| 129 | 1208043 | Carbon; Monroe | 1 | 3,702 acres (1,498 ha) | 41°2′5″N 75°34′26″W | 1,627 feet (496 m) | Blakeslee |
| 130 | 1188442 | Mercer; Venango | 2 | 3,182.22 acres (1,287.80 ha) | 41°18′53″N 80°3′12″W | 1,421 feet (433 m) | Sandy Lake |
| 131 | 1193435 | Huntingdon | 1 | 309 acres (125 ha) | 40°38′58″N 78°11′8″W | 1,119 feet (341 m) | Tyrone |
| 132 | 1188443 | Schuylkill | 2 | 1,381 acres (559 ha) | 40°41′5″N 76°30′0″W | 1,421 feet (433 m) | Valley View |
| 133 | 1199595 | Lycoming | 1 | 2,536 acres (1,026 ha) | 41°25′2″N 77°0′9″W | 2,021 feet (616 m) | Trout Run |
| 134 | 1199596 | Lycoming; Sullivan | 3 | 8,375.01 acres (3,389.25 ha) | 41°25′0″N 76°46′24″W | 1,601 feet (488 m) | Barbours |
| 135 | 1188444 | Lackawanna | 1 | 3,549 acres (1,436 ha) | 41°14′27″N 75°34′38″W | 1,808 feet (551 m) | Thornhurst |
| 136 | 1188445 | Lancaster | 1 | 94 acres (38 ha) | 39°51′19″N 76°6′39″W | 443 feet (135 m) | Kirkwood |
| 137 | 1188446 | Armstrong | 1 | 1,134.79 acres (459.23 ha) | 40°59′11″N 79°20′45″W | 1,384 feet (422 m) | Distant |
| 138 | 1188447 | Fayette | 3 | 2,918.65 acres (1,181.14 ha) | 39°46′58″N 79°43′10″W | 2,169 feet (661 m) | Brownfield |
| 139 | 1208042 | Bucks | 3 | 265 acres (107 ha) | 40°24′25″N 75°18′33″W | 646 feet (197 m) | Quakertown |
| 140 | 1208348 | Susquehanna | 3 | 1,347 acres (545 ha) | 41°56′15″N 76°5′2″W | 1,348 feet (411 m) | Friendsville |
| 141 | 1188448 | Carbon | 1 | 17,047.91 acres (6,899.04 ha) | 40°55′49″N 75°45′34″W | 1,542 feet (470 m) | Christmans |
| 142 | 1188449 | Bradford | 1 | 369 acres (149 ha) | 41°35′45″N 76°21′31″W | 1,509 feet (460 m) | Colley |
| 143 | 1188450 | Warren | 2 | 8,500 acres (3,400 ha) | 41°51′18″N 79°26′54″W | 1,604 feet (489 m) | Pittsfield |
| 144 | 1188545 | Crawford; Erie | 2 | 648 acres (262 ha) | 41°50′28″N 79°43′41″W | 1,693 feet (516 m) | Spartansburg |
| 145 | 1193436 | Lebanon | 1 | 2,816 acres (1,140 ha) | 40°13′59″N 76°29′41″W | 577 feet (176 m) | Elizabethtown |
| 146 | 1208041 | Crawford | 1 | 526 acres (213 ha) | 41°43′58″N 79°58′6″W | 1,378 feet (420 m) | Townville |
| 147 | 1188451 | Blair | 4 | 6,107 acres (2,471 ha) | 40°24′37″N 78°19′32″W | 1,585 feet (483 m) | Martinsburg |
| 148 | 1188452 | Beaver; Lawrence | 1 | 575 acres (233 ha) | 40°51′47″N 80°21′24″W | 1,234 feet (376 m) | Beaver Falls |
| 149 | 1208039 | Carbon; Luzerne | 2 | 1,991.139 acres (805.785 ha) | 41°0′42″N 75°45′51″W | 1,224 feet (373 m) | Hickory Run |
| 150 | 1206192 | Lawrence | 2 | 586 acres (237 ha) | 41°6′4″N 80°26′31″W | 919 feet (280 m) | Edinburg |
| 151 | 1188453 | Lawrence; Mercer | 2 | 1,438.24 acres (582.04 ha) | 41°5′27″N 80°9′25″W | 1,260 feet (380 m) | Harlansburg |
| 152 | 1188454 | Crawford | 1 | 500 acres (200 ha) | 41°50′45″N 80°14′11″W | 1,319 feet (402 m) | Edinboro South |
| 153 | 1188455 | Indiana; Westmoreland | 1 | 2,941.76 acres (1,190.49 ha) | 40°24′52″N 79°10′32″W | 1,647 feet (502 m) | Bolivar |
| 154 | 1188456 | Erie | 1 | 1,455 acres (589 ha) | 41°59′30″N 79°42′30″W | 1,690 feet (520 m) | Corry |
| 155 | 1188457 | Erie | 1 | 390.7 acres (158.1 ha) | 42°0′22″N 79°52′26″W | 1,545 feet (471 m) | Wattsburg |
| 156 | 1199984 | Lancaster; Lebanon | 2 | 5,247 acres (2,123 ha) | 40°15′6″N 76°22′37″W | 846 feet (258 m) | Manheim |
| 157 | 1188458 | Bucks | 1 | 2,011 acres (814 ha) | 40°29′48″N 75°13′51″W | 797 feet (243 m) | Bedminster |
| 158 | 1188459 | Blair; Cambria; Clearfield | 1 | 17,411 acres (7,046 ha) | 40°40′50″N 78°20′29″W | 2,392 feet (729 m) | Blandburg |
| 159 | 1188460 | Wayne | 2 | 9,289 acres (3,759 ha) | 41°43′41″N 75°17′36″W | 1,647 feet (502 m) | Lake Como |
| 160 | 1211829 | Schuylkill | 1 | 245.8 acres (99.5 ha) | 40°32′27″N 76°20′14″W | 538 feet (164 m) | Swatara Hill |
| 161 | 1188461 | Erie | 1 | 235 acres (95 ha) | 42°0′15″N 79°54′52″W | 1,549 feet (472 m) | Hammett |
| 162 | 1188462 | Erie | 1 | 1,072 acres (434 ha) | 41°58′27″N 79°50′0″W | 1,496 feet (456 m) | Union City |
| 163 | 1208003 | Erie | 1 | 333 acres (135 ha) | 42°8′5″N 79°49′59″W | 1,463 feet (446 m) | North East |
| 164 | 1188463 | Butler | 1 | 456 acres (185 ha) | 40°53′20″N 79°46′19″W | 1,388 feet (423 m) | East Butler |
| 165 | 1188464 | Northumberland | 1 | 1,267 acres (513 ha) | 40°47′55″N 76°38′15″W | 1,296 feet (395 m) | Trevorton |
| 166 | 1188465 | Blair; Huntingdon | 3 | 11,851 acres (4,796 ha) | 40°32′37″N 78°14′29″W | 1,211 feet (369 m) | Spruce Creek |
| 167 | 1188466 | Erie | 1 | 627 acres (254 ha) | 42°0′0″N 79°46′41″W | 1,565 feet (477 m) | Union City |
| 168 | 1188467 | Carbon; Monroe; Northampton | 7 | 7,716 acres (3,123 ha) | 40°49′19″N 75°26′53″W | 1,447 feet (441 m) | Kunkletown |
| 169 | 1193437 | Cumberland; Perry | 1 | 2,514 acres (1,017 ha) | 40°10′3″N 77°29′28″W | 587 feet (179 m) | Newville |
| 170 | 1188468 | Perry | 2 | 9,248 acres (3,743 ha) | 40°20′15″N 77°2′26″W | 751 feet (229 m) | Wertzville |
| 171 | 1193438 | Juniata; Perry | 1 | 1,086 acres (439 ha) | 40°33′9″N 77°12′6″W | 1,194 feet (364 m) | Millerstown |
| 172 | 1188469 | Bradford | 1 | 722.3 acres (292.3 ha) | 41°37′22″N 76°17′11″W | 1,004 feet (306 m) | Colley |
| 173 | 1205937 | Beaver | 1 | 1,063 acres (430 ha) | 40°40′26″N 80°28′13″W | 1,207 feet (368 m) | Midland |
| 174 | 1193439 | Indiana | 1 | 3,956 acres (1,601 ha) | 40°52′31″N 78°49′57″W | 1,985 feet (605 m) | McGees Mills |
| 175 | 1188470 | Susquehanna | 1 | 736 acres (298 ha) | 41°53′19″N 75°44′42″W | 1,342 feet (409 m) | Great Bend |
| 176 | 1188471 | Centre | 1 | 6,446 acres (2,609 ha) | 40°46′31″N 77°58′13″W | 1,220 feet (370 m) | Julian |
| 178 | 1206198 | Lawrence | 1 | 165 acres (67 ha) | 41°33′7″N 80°19′4″W | 968 feet (295 m) | New Castle North |
| 179 | 1188472 | Greene | 3 | 5,715.6 acres (2,313.0 ha) | 39°49′14″N 80°23′24″W | 1,253 feet (382 m) | New Freeport |
| 180 | 1199985 | Pike | 1 | 11,492.81 acres (4,650.98 ha) | 41°22′3″N 75°2′52″W | 1,414 feet (431 m) | Pecks Pond |
| 181 | 1208002 | York | 2 | 563.3 acres (228.0 ha) | 39°50′21″N 76°22′3″W | 699 feet (213 m) | Holtwood |
| 182 | 1193440 | Berks | 1 | 273 acres (110 ha) | 40°31′54″N 75°49′51″W | 427 feet (130 m) | Kutztown |
| 183 | 1199598 | Pike | 1 | 2,797 acres (1,132 ha) | 41°26′40″N 75°9′0″W | 965 feet (294 m) | Hawley |
| 184 | 1188473 | Blair; Cambria | 1 | 4,610 acres (1,870 ha) | 40°34′2″N 78°29′37″W | 2,044 feet (623 m) | Altoona |
| 185 | 1188474 | Indiana | 1 | 629.53 acres (254.76 ha) | 40°41′18″N 78°51′40″W | 1,581 feet (482 m) | Barnesboro |
| 186 | 1208001 | Monroe | 1 | 967.2 acres (391.4 ha) | 40°58′59″N 75°20′6″W | 1,027 feet (313 m) | Saylorsburg |
| 187 | 1208000 | Luzerne | 3 | 8,283 acres (3,352 ha) | 41°4′23″N 75°54′22″W | 1,263 feet (385 m) | White Haven |
| 188 | 1188475 | Snyder | 1 | 1,637 acres (662 ha) | 40°47′3″N 77°10′5″W | 591 feet (180 m) | Beavertown |
| 189 | 1212723 | Beaver | 2 | 415.3 acres (168.1 ha) | 40°31′24″N 80°25′18″W | 1,220 feet (370 m) | Aliquippa |
| 190 | 1188476 | Erie | 1 | 394 acres (159 ha) | 41°57′6″N 79°53′42″W | 1,325 feet (404 m) | Waterford |
| 191 | 1188477 | Erie | 1 | 1,223 acres (495 ha) | 42°4′41″N 79°47′57″W | 1,594 feet (486 m) | Wattsburg |
| 192 | 1188478 | Erie | 1 | 333 acres (135 ha) | 41°54′52″N 80°2′37″W | 1,578 feet (481 m) | Cambridge Springs NE |
| 193 | 1193441 | Union | 1 | 325.92 acres (131.90 ha) | 40°54′33″N 76°53′29″W | 686 feet (209 m) | Lewisburg |
| 194 | 1188479 | Snyder | 1 | 717 acres (290 ha) | 40°39′29″N 76°59′3″W | 623 feet (190 m) | Dalmatia |
| 195 | 1188480 | Jefferson | 2 | 3,483 acres (1,410 ha) | 40°57′37″N 78°49′44″W | 1,447 feet (441 m) | McGees Mills |
| 196 | 1188481 | Bucks | 2 | 424 acres (172 ha) | 40°22′34″N 75°21′51″W | 466 feet (142 m) | Telford |
| 197 | 1188482 | Warren | 2 | 1,555 acres (629 ha) | 41°58′56″N 79°34′0″W | 1,460 feet (450 m) | Columbus |
| 198 | 1188483 | Blair; Cambria | 3 | 8,604 acres (3,482 ha) | 40°26′25″N 78°32′5″W | 1,929 feet (588 m) | Cresson |
| 199 | 1193442 | Crawford | 1 | 1,132 acres (458 ha) | 41°45′36″N 79°49′30″W | 1,444 feet (440 m) | Centerville |
| 200 | 1208040 | Crawford | 1 | 154 acres (62 ha) | 41°42′33″N 79°56′57″W | 1,417 feet (432 m) | Townville |
| 201 | 1188484 | Union | 1 | 269 acres (109 ha) | 40°52′46″N 77°3′22″W | 604 feet (184 m) | Mifflinburg |
| 202 | 1188546 | Crawford | 1 | 507 acres (205 ha) | 41°50′34″N 79°50′30″W | 1,585 feet (483 m) | Lake Canadohta |
| 203 | 1208078 | Allegheny | 2 | 1,245.8 acres (504.2 ha) | 40°35′54″N 79°58′0″W | 1,138 feet (347 m) | Mars |
| 204 | 1208077 | Potter | 1 | 4,030.25 acres (1,630.98 ha) | 41°52′52″N 78°4′4″W | 2,195 feet (669 m) | Coudersport |
| 205 | 1188485 | Lehigh | 1 | 1,303 acres (527 ha) | 40°39′29″N 75°39′37″W | 702 feet (214 m) | Slatedale |
| 206 | 1208076 | Luzerne | 2 | 1,524.78 acres (617.06 ha) | 41°17′27″N 76°11′37″W | 1,237 feet (377 m) | Sweet Valley |
| 207 | 1208075 | Luzerne | 6 | 2,518 acres (1,019 ha) | 41°9′48″N 75°57′58″W | 1,509 feet (460 m) | Wilkes-Barre West |
| 208 | 1188486 | Tioga | 2 | 8,858.32 acres (3,584.83 ha) | 41°46′3″N 77°33′25″W | 1,870 feet (570 m) | Sabinsville |
| 209 | 1208074 | Pike | 1 | 4,391 acres (1,777 ha) | 41°24′48″N 74°50′9″W | 1,132 feet (345 m) | Pond Eddy |
| 210 | 1188487 | Dauphin | 1 | 11,124 acres (4,502 ha) | 40°31′23″N 76°39′39″W | 1,152 feet (351 m) | Lykens |
| 211 | 1188488; 1992845 | Dauphin; Lebanon; Schuylkill | 1 | 44,343 acres (17,945 ha) | 40°28′12″N 76°40′54″W | 1,027 feet (313 m) | Grantville |
| 212 | 1188489 | Snyder | 1 | 504 acres (204 ha) | 40°45′17″N 76°52′35″W | 735 feet (224 m) | Freeburg |
| 213 | 1188490 | Crawford | 3 | 5,603 acres (2,267 ha) | 41°34′0″N 80°12′59″W | 1,063 feet (324 m) | Geneva |
| 214 | 1193443 | Crawford | 2 | 9,661 acres (3,910 ha) | 41°35′7″N 80°23′50″W | 1,017 feet (310 m) | Conneaut Lake |
| 215 | 1188491 | Juniata | 1 | 1,276 acres (516 ha) | 40°23′35″N 77°38′15″W | 912 feet (278 m) | McVeytown |
| 216 | 1188492 | Lawrence | 1 | 488 acres (197 ha) | 41°0′9″N 80°11′34″W | 1,207 feet (368 m) | Harlansburg |
| 217 | 1199599 | Carbon; Lehigh; Schuylkill | 3 | 8,087 acres (3,273 ha) | 40°43′41″N 75°44′59″W | 961 feet (293 m) | Lehighton |
| 218 | 1188493 | Erie | 1 | 1,351.2 acres (546.8 ha) | 42°2′57″N 79°55′13″W | 1,289 feet (393 m) | Hammett |
| 219 | 1193444 | Bradford | 1 | 5,619.14 acres (2,273.99 ha) | 41°58′5″N 76°11′52″W | 1,319 feet (402 m) | Windham |
| 220 | 1208350 | Lancaster | 1 | 96.3 acres (39.0 ha) | 40°16′35″N 76°7′6″W | 495 feet (151 m) | Sinking Spring |
| 221 | 1188494 | Monroe | 2 | 4,675 acres (1,892 ha) | 41°9′48″N 75°19′2″W | 1,788 feet (545 m) | Buck Hill Falls |
| 222 | 1208073 | Schuylkill | 2 | 2,382.58 acres (964.20 ha) | 40°42′36″N 76°0′24″W | 1,381 feet (421 m) | Orwigsburg |
| 223 | 1188498; 1193445 | Greene | 7 | 7,790 acres (3,150 ha) | 39°48′51″N 80°3′26″W; 40°44′35″N 76°50′54″W | 423 feet (129 m); 1,332 feet (406 m) | Pillow; Garards Fort |
| 224 | 1208067 | Luzerne | 1 | 3 acres (1.2 ha) | 41°11′22″N 76°5′53″W | 1,122 feet (342 m) | Nanticoke |
| 225 | 1205690 | Lebanon | 1 | 297 acres (120 ha) | 40°18′41″N 76°11′58″W | 1,122 feet (342 m) | Womelsdorf |
| 226 | 1188495 | Columbia | 1 | 4,370 acres (1,770 ha) | 41°7′59″N 76°35′20″W | 1,079 feet (329 m) | Lairdsville |
| 227 | 1208072 | Schuylkill | 1 | 1,506 acres (609 ha) | 40°49′46″N 75°59′38″W | 1,089 feet (332 m) | Tamaqua |
| 228 | 1188496 | Somerset | 1 | 3,906.14 acres (1,580.76 ha) | 40°4′40″N 78°46′15″W | 2,680 feet (820 m) | Central City |
| 229 | 1208070 | Schuylkill | 2 | 2,891 acres (1,170 ha) | 40°36′31″N 76°24′21″W | 1,096 feet (334 m) | Minersville |
| 230 | 1208065 | Cumberland; Perry | 2 | 1,073 acres (434 ha) | 40°16′46″N 77°11′38″W | 804 feet (245 m) | Shermans Dale |
| 231 | 1193446 | Somerset | 1 | 429 acres (174 ha) | 39°45′52″N 79°1′32″W | 2,759 feet (841 m) | Meyersville |
| 232 | 1188497 | Washington | 4 | 5,103.5 acres (2,065.3 ha) | 40°10′50″N 80°26′26″W | 1,115 feet (340 m) | West Middletown |
| 233 | 1208349 | Northumberland | 5 | 774 acres (313 ha) | 40°44′5″N 76°51′3″W | 433 feet (132 m) | Sunbury |
| 234 | 1208347 | Montgomery | 2 | 486.12 acres (196.73 ha) | 40°13′49″N 75°32′19″W | 266 feet (81 m) | Phoenixville |
| 235 | 1208346 | Franklin | 2 | 6,176 acres (2,499 ha) | 39°57′48″N 77°49′3″W | 1,696 feet (517 m) | Saint Thomas |
| 236 | 1188499 | Susquehanna | 4 | 2,010 acres (810 ha) | 41°46′11″N 75°31′22″W | 1,955 feet (596 m) | Thompson |
| 237 | 1188500 | Bradford | 7 | 161.83 acres (65.49 ha) | 41°42′33″N 76°19′25″W | 686 feet (209 m) | Wyalusing |
| 238 | 1188501 | Fayette | 1 | 662.7 acres (268.2 ha) | 39°53′23″N 79°54′28″W | 840 feet (260 m) | Carmichaels |
| 239 | 1208333 | Bradford | 1 | 842 acres (341 ha) | 41°54′41″N 76°36′41″W | 1,467 feet (447 m) | Sayre |
| 240 | 1188502 | Bradford | 4 | - | 41°39′48″N 76°25′23″W | 1,916 feet (584 m) | Monroeton |
| 242 | 1193447 | York | 1 | 1,531.2 acres (619.7 ha) | 40°5′25″N 76°57′25″W | 659 feet (201 m) | Wellsville |
| 243 | 1208345 | York | 2 | 1,160 acres (470 ha) | 40°3′15″N 77°2′23″W | 594 feet (181 m) | Dillsburg |
| 244 | 1188503 | Jefferson | 1 | 4,867.6 acres (1,969.8 ha) | 41°5′26″N 78°56′43″W | 1,654 feet (504 m) | Reynoldsville |
| 245 | 1190993 | Washington | 4 | 4,044 acres (1,637 ha) | 40°3′34″N 80°23′52″W | 1,197 feet (365 m) | Claysville |
| 246 | 1188504 | Dauphin | 1 | 423.7 acres (171.5 ha) | 40°13′2″N 76°40′29″W | 853 feet (260 m) | Harrisburg East |
| 247 | 1208344 | Armstrong | 1 | 452.3 acres (183.0 ha) | 40°46′19″N 79°34′41″W | 1,073 feet (327 m) | Kittanning |
| 248 | 1208590 | Indiana | 1 | 817 acres (331 ha) | 40°37′9″N 79°4′30″W | 1,460 feet (450 m) | Brush Valley |
| 249 | 1208343 | Adams | 3 | 1,959 acres (793 ha) | 39°57′32″N 77°7′26″W | 574 feet (175 m) | Biglerville |
| 250 | 1188505 | Bradford | 1 | 444 acres (180 ha) | 41°38′47″N 76°19′47″W | 1,197 feet (365 m) | Wyalusing |
| 251 | 1193448 | Huntingdon | 3 | 4,229 acres (1,711 ha) | 40°15′7″N 77°47′18″W | 1,263 feet (385 m) | Shade Gap |
| 252 | 1193449 | Lycoming; Union | 1 | 3,014 acres (1,220 ha) | 41°8′44″N 76°57′19″W | 673 feet (205 m) | Montoursville South |
| 253 | 1208342 | Venango | 1 | 665 acres (269 ha) | 41°28′47″N 79°37′30″W | 1,535 feet (468 m) | President |
| 254 | 1188506 | Dauphin; Perry | 7 | 1,162 acres (470 ha) | 40°29′25″N 76°58′25″W | 600 feet (180 m) | Halifax |
| 255 | 1208341 | Centre; Clinton | 1 | 2,278 acres (922 ha) | 41°34′25″N 77°32′56″W | 1,132 feet (345 m) | Beech Creek |
| 256 | 1208337 | Perry | 1 | 1,254 acres (507 ha) | 40°24′29″N 77°7′44″W | 906 feet (276 m) | Newport |
| 257 | 1208071 | Schuylkill | 2 | 3,489 acres (1,412 ha) | 40°46′16″N 75°57′11″W | 1,030 feet (310 m) | Tamaqua |
| 258 | 1188507 | Dauphin; Northumberland; Perry | 20 | 844 acres (342 ha) | 40°36′22″N 76°57′26″W | 509 feet (155 m) | Millersburg |
| 259 | 1208336 | Armstrong | 1 | 351.66 acres (142.31 ha) | 40°54′3″N 79°38′18″W | 1,266 feet (386 m) | Chicora |
| 260 | 1208335 | Luzerne | 2 | 3,115.8 acres (1,260.9 ha) | 41°8′21″N 76°11′49″W | 1,037 feet (316 m) | Shickshinny |
| 261 | 1208334 | Bedford | 1 | 3,220 acres (1,300 ha) | 40°6′31″N 78°15′32″W | 1,427 feet (435 m) | Everett East |
| 262 | 1208332 | Indiana | 5 | 5,419 acres (2,193 ha) | 40°48′20″N 78°54′0″W | 1,483 feet (452 m) | Rochester Mills |
| 263 | 1208331 | Erie; Warren | 1 | 668 acres (270 ha) | 41°57′24″N 79°36′53″W | 1,585 feet (483 m) | Columbus |
| 264 | 1188509; 1208069 | Dauphin; Schuylkill | 4 | 8,836 acres (3,576 ha) | 40°34′58″N 76°46′34″W | 1,175 feet (358 m); 1,253 feet (382 m) | Lykens |
| 265 | 1208329 | Fayette | 1 | 517.47 acres (209.41 ha) | 39°46′40″N 79°29′1″W | 2,192 feet (668 m) | Ohiopyle |
| 266 | - | Clarion; Jefferson | 2 | 495.877 acres (200.674 ha) | 41°9′40″N 79°14′2″W | 1,683 feet (513 m); 1,747 feet (532 m) | Corsica; Strattonville |
| 267 | 1208352 | Blair | 1 | 1,041 acres (421 ha) | 40°33′39″N 78°27′37″W | 2,569 feet (783 m) | Altoona |
| 268 | 1208087 | Tioga | 2 | 3,023.13 acres (1,223.42 ha) | 41°37′23″N 77°14′11″W | 1,716 feet (523 m) | Morris |
| 269 | 1208085 | Crawford | 3 | 685 acres (277 ha) | 41°47′42″N 80°13′41″W | 1,165 feet (355 m) | Edinboro South |
| 270 | 1208084 | Mercer | 2 | 2,202.601 acres (891.361 ha) | 41°27′11″N 80°9′20″W | 1,302 feet (397 m) | Hadley |
| 271 | 1208048 | Somerset | 1 | 1,855.45 acres (750.87 ha) | 39°46′30″N 79°16′5″W | 2,497 feet (761 m) | Confluence |
| 272 | 1208589 | Warren | 1 | 185 acres (75 ha) | 41°44′7″N 79°36′4″W | 1,562 feet (476 m) | Grand Valley |
| 273 | 1208407 | Indiana | 1 | 979.59 acres (396.43 ha) | 40°34′24″N 79°6′24″W | 1,322 feet (403 m) | Brush Valley |
| 274 | 1208593 | Berks; Lancaster | 2 | 668 acres (270 ha) | 40°16′14″N 76°3′55″W | 456 feet (139 m) | Sinking Spring |
| 275 | 1208401 | Dauphin | 1 | 2.75 acres (1.11 ha) | 40°11′24″N 76°46′8″W | 259 feet (79 m) | Steelton |
| 276 | 1208400 | Indiana | 2 | 4,740 acres (1,920 ha) | 40°28′13″N 79°8′22″W | 1,270 feet (390 m) | Bolivar |
| 277 | 1208399 | Crawford | 1 | 972 acres (393 ha) | 41°48′43″N 80°2′2″W | 1,207 feet (368 m) | Cambridge Springs |
| 278 | 1208397 | Blair; Huntingdon | 4 | 1,804 acres (730 ha) | 40°42′45″N 78°10′39″W | 1,168 feet (356 m) | Tyrone |
| 279 | 1208394 | Cambria | 1 | 460.6 acres (186.4 ha) | 40°39′11″N 78°35′14″W | 2,060 feet (630 m) | Cresson |
| 280 | 1208405 | Berks | 3 | 2,552 acres (1,033 ha) | 40°23′49″N 76°3′54″W | 427 feet (130 m) | Sinking Spring |
| 281 | 1208393 | Perry | 2 | 1,593 acres (645 ha) | 40°27′45″N 77°4′15″W | 705 feet (215 m) | Duncannon |
| 282 | 1208392 | Warren | 2 | 440 acres (180 ha) | 41°59′24″N 79°8′9″W | 1,237 feet (377 m) | Russell |
| 283 | 1208391 | Clarion; Jefferson | 1 | 3,062.85 acres (1,239.49 ha) | 41°17′57″N 79°11′12″W | 1,558 feet (475 m) | Cooksburg |
| 284 | 1208390 | Lawrence; Mercer | 1 | 1,385 acres (560 ha) | 41°7′31″N 80°12′4″W | 1,309 feet (399 m) | Harlansburg |
| 285 | - | Beaver | 3 | 2,810.4 acres (1,137.3 ha) | 40°48′4″N 80°29′33″W | New Galilee; Palestine | |
| 286 | 1208068 | Schuylkill | 3 | 478 acres (193 ha) | 40°37′36″N 76°9′11″W | 509 feet (155 m) | Pottsville |
| 287 | 1208389 | Armstrong | 5 | 2,016.08 acres (815.88 ha) | 40°55′38″N 79°26′48″W | 1,273 feet (388 m) | Templeton |
| 288 | 1208388 | Lancaster | 1 | 88.56 acres (35.84 ha) | 39°53′56″N 76°20′8″W | 489 feet (149 m) | Conestoga |
| 289 | 1208386 | Bradford | 1 | 1,552 acres (628 ha) | 41°47′2″N 76°39′32″W | 1,270 feet (390 m) | East Troy |
| 290 | 1208591 | Dauphin; Perry | 6 | 1,051 acres (425 ha) | 40°25′7″N 77°0′20″W | 361 feet (110 m) | Duncannon |
| 291 | 1208383 | Erie; Warren | 1 | 1,260 acres (510 ha) | 41°52′37″N 79°35′22″W | 1,765 feet (538 m) | Columbus |
| 292 | 1208066 | Luzerne | 1 | 630 acres (250 ha) | 41°12′52″N 79°49′26″W | 1,752 feet (534 m) | Wilkes-Barre East |
| 293 | 1208382 | Elk | 2 | 2,284.54 acres (924.52 ha) | 41°29′2″N 78°26′35″W | 1,614 feet (492 m) | Rathburn |
| 294 | 1208381 | Mercer | 2 | 416.62 acres (168.60 ha) | 41°18′9″N 80°14′28″W | 1,152 feet (351 m) | Jackson Center |
| 295 | 1208380 | Centre; Clinton | 1 | 12,336 acres (4,992 ha) | 40°59′47″N 77°28′37″W | 1,348 feet (411 m) | Millheim |
| 296 | 1208379 | Fayette | 4 | 2,421.8 acres (980.1 ha) | 40°5′56″N 79°42′18″W | 1,243 feet (379 m) | Dawson |
| 297 | 1208378 | Washington | 1 | 633 acres (256 ha) | 40°5′9″N 80°8′10″W | 1,145 feet (349 m) | Ellsworth |
| 298 | 1208377 | Lycoming | 1 | 1,140.21 acres (461.43 ha) | 41°21′34″N 76°58′36″W | 1,765 feet (538 m) | Montoursville North |
| 299 | 1208376 | Wayne | 1 | 2,670 acres (1,080 ha) | 41°58′51″N 75°22′4″W | 1,703 feet (519 m) | Starrucca |
| 300 | 1208375 | Lackawanna; Wayne | 2 | 5,756 acres (2,329 ha) | 41°29′47″N 75°29′26″W | 1,365 feet (416 m) | Waymart |
| 301 | 1208056 | McKean | 11 | 2,252 acres (911 ha) | 41°55′31″N 78°22′55″W | 1,444 feet (440 m) | Smethport |
| 302 | 1208373 | Greene; Washington | 4 | 2,960.7 acres (1,198.2 ha) | 39°58′5″N 80°28′30″W | 1,371 feet (418 m) | Wind Ridge |
| 303 | 1208371 | Washington | 2 | 221 acres (89 ha) | 40°17′53″N 80°28′50″W | 928 feet (283 m) | Avella |
| 304 | 1209264 | Butler | 1 | 458 acres (185 ha) | 40°52′37″N 79°42′17″W | 1,145 feet (349 m) | Chicora |
| 305 | 1208064 | Cumberland | 1 | 730 acres (300 ha) | 40°7′0″N 77°7′11″W | 879 feet (268 m) | Dillsburg |
| 306 | 1208369 | Warren | 1 | 1,038.15 acres (420.12 ha) | 41°56′14″N 79°30′17″W | 1,430 feet (440 m) | Columbus |
| 307 | 1208368 | Lackawanna | 1 | 1,220.8 acres (494.0 ha) | 41°32′6″N 75°34′19″W | 1,811 feet (552 m) | Carbondale |
| 309 | - | Warren | 1 | 992 acres (401 ha) | 41°40′29″N 79°26′13″W | 1,700 feet (520 m) | Tidioute |
| 310 | - | Wayne | 1 | 1,120 acres (450 ha) | 41°26′50″N 75°25′30″W | 1,646 feet (502 m) | Lake Ariel |
| 311 | - | Elk | 3 | 3,792.9 acres (1,534.9 ha) | 41°20′27″N 78°23′27″W | 1,711 feet (522 m) | Dents Run; Weedville |
| 312 | - | Lackawanna; Monroe; Wayne | 1 | 4,459 acres (1,804 ha) | 41°15′44″N 75°24′54″W | 2,141 feet (653 m) | Strin |
| 313 | - | Tioge | 2 | 408.7 acres (165.4 ha) | 41°47′35″N 77°19′32″W | 1,140 feet (350 m); 1,720 feet (520 m) | Keeneyville |
| 314 | - | Erie | 1 | 3,564.9 acres (1,442.7 ha) | 41°58′17″N 80°29′18″W | 650 feet (200 m) | East Springfield |
| 315 | - | Berks | 4 | 324 acres (131 ha) | 40°25′29″N 75°41′5″W | 820 feet (250 m); 960 feet (290 m); 820 feet (250 m); 1,000 feet (300 m) | Manatawny |
| 316 | - | Pike | 1 | 2,720 acres (1,100 ha) | 41°33′25″N 75°3′16″W | 1,307 feet (398 m) | Narrowsburg |
| 317 | - | Union | 3 | 1,103 acres (446 ha) | 40°53′43″N 77°11′22″W | 761 feet (232 m); 840 feet (260 m); 951 feet (290 m) | Hartleton |
| 318 | - | Monroe | 1 | 857 acres (347 ha) | 41°5′23″N 75°28′57″W | 1,963 feet (598 m) | Pocono Pines |
| 319 | - | Dauphin | 1 | 53 acres (21 ha) | 40°21′37″N 76°57′53″W | 320 feet (98 m) | Harrisburg West |
| 320 | - | Jefferson | 1 | 478.498 acres (193.641 ha) | 40°57′12″N 79°9′45″W | 1,805 feet (550 m) | Dayton |
| 321 | - | Clinton | 1 | 3,254 acres (1,317 ha) | 41°10′27″N 78°0′25″W | 1,686 feet (514 m) | Franklinville |
| 322 | - | Huntingdon | 1 | 2,863.772 acres (1,158.927 ha) | 40°32′30″N 77°0′7″W | 1,159 feet (353 m); 1,220 feet (370 m) | Donation |
| 323 | - | Centre | 2 | 2,967 acres (1,201 ha) | 40°57′54″N 77°42′42″W | 1,711 feet (522 m) | Mingoville |
| 324 | 2488507 | Berks | 1 | 4.75 acres (1.92 ha) | 40°18′22″N 75°55′15″W | 187 feet (57 m) | Reading |
| 325 | - | Northumberland; Lycoming | 1 | 637.4 acres (257.9 ha) | 41°9′56″N 76°45′46″W | 1,050 feet (320 m) | Muncy |
| 326 | - | Schuylkill | 3 | 2,690.60 acres (1,088.85 ha) | 40°45′13″N 76°15′39″W | 1,600 feet (490 m); 1,682 feet (513 m); 1,646 feet (502 m) | Pottsville; Minersville |
| 327 | - | York | 1 | 244.472 acres (98.934 ha) | 39°47′32″N 76°26′20″W | 600 feet (180 m) | Airville |
| 328 | - | Indiana | 2 | 517 acres (209 ha) | 40°28′2″N 79°23′0″W | 1,240 feet (380 m) | Saltsburg |
| 329 | - | Columbia; Schuylkill | 1 | 1,744 acres (706 ha) | 40°49′35″N 76°17′40″W | 1,802 feet (549 m) | Ashland |
| 330 | - | Clarion | 1 | 2,254.62 acres (912.41 ha) | 41°8′27″N 79°29′27″W | 1,458 feet (444 m) | Clarion |
| 331 | - | Clearfield | 1 | 5,272 acres (2,134 ha) | 41°10′0″N 78°37′2″W | 1,723 feet (525 m) | Pennfield |
| 332 | - | Indiana | 1 | 2,284 acres (924 ha) | 40°31′48″N 79°18′7″W | 1,429 feet (436 m) | McIntyre |
| 333 | - | Centre | 1 | 1,210 acres (490 ha) | 40°51′44″N 77°48′22″W | 1,200 feet (370 m) | State College |
| 334 | - | Cambria | 8 | 2,013 acres (815 ha) | 40°41′36″N 78°43′5″W | 1,700 feet (520 m) | Hastings |
| 335 | - | Tioga | 1 | 1,169 acres (473 ha) | 41°38′44″N 76°59′20″W | 2,322 feet (708 m) | Gleason |
| 336 | - | Lawrence | 1 | 580 acres (230 ha) | 40°56′53″N 80°20′48″W | 1,000 feet (300 m) | New Castle South |

- Some quantities shown are deeded acreage, some are calculated acreage.

== See also ==
- Pennsylvania State Game Lands reserves
