= Pennsylvania State Game Lands Number 47 =

Park in the United States

- Location within Pennsylvania Location within the United States
- Location: Venango County
- Coordinates: 41°25′56″N 79°36′26″W
- Area: 2,214 acres (896 ha)
- Elevation: 1,558 feet (475 m)
- Max. elevation: 1,564 feet (477 m)
- Min. elevation: 1,060 feet (320 m)
- Owner: Pennsylvania Game Commission

The Pennsylvania State Game Lands Number 47 are Pennsylvania State Game Lands in Venango Counties in Pennsylvania in the United States providing hunting, bird watching, and other activities.

== Geography ==
State Game Lands Number 47 is located in Cranberry and President Townships in Venango County.

== Statistics ==
SGL 47 was entered into the Geographic Names Information System on 2 August 1979 as identification number 1199601, elevation is listed as 837 feet (255 m).
