= Joseph E. Ibberson Conservation Area =

State park in Pennsylvania, USA

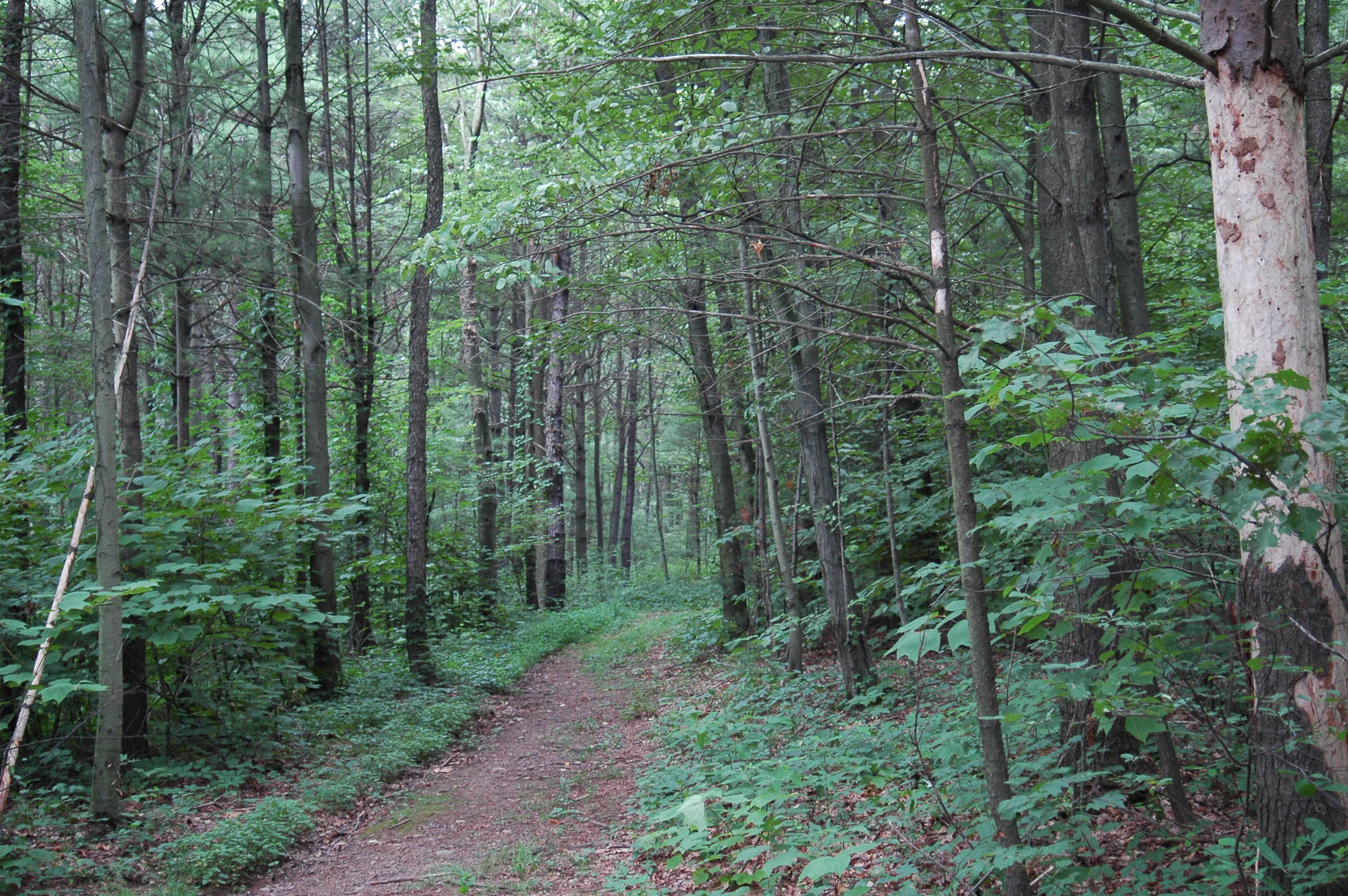

- Location within Pennsylvania Location within the United States
- Interactive map of Joseph E. Ibberson Conservation Area
- Location: Dauphin County, Pennsylvania, United States
- Coordinates: 40°26′33″N 76°51′33″W
- Area: 803 acres (325 ha)
- Elevation: 1,053 feet (321 m)
- Established: 2000
- Administrator: Pennsylvania Department of Conservation and Natural Resources
- Website: Official website
- Pennsylvania State Parks

Joseph E. Ibberson Conservation Area is an 803-acre (325 ha) Pennsylvania state park in Middle Paxton and Wayne Townships, Dauphin County, Pennsylvania in the United States.

It is dominated by large hardwood trees and offers opportunities for hiking, cross-country skiing and hunting. Environmental education programs are available. It is named after Joseph E. Ibberson, who donated the land for use as a conservation area on December 9, 1998. Joseph E. Ibberson Conservation Area is off Pennsylvania Route 225 on Peters Mountain. It was opened to the public in 2000.

== Conservation area ==
A conservation area is different from a state park. Conservation areas have much less development on the lands than a state park. They are large tracts of land with few improvements, a lack of through roads and the recreational facilities are minimal. There is an effort to manage the resources with minimal development of the park. Other conservation areas in Pennsylvania are the nearby Boyd Big Tree Preserve Conservation Area (also in Dauphin County) and Varden Conservation Area in Wayne County.

== The forest ==
Peters Mountain was once covered with an old-growth forest of white pine and hemlock trees. These trees were cut down during the lumber era that swept throughout the mountains of Pennsylvania during the mid-to late 19th century. The largely coniferous forest was replaced by the mixture of hardwood trees that are seen today at the Joseph E. Ibberson Conservation Area. The common tree species are chestnut, red, black and scarlet oak, table mountain, white, and Virginia pine, hickory, black gum, basswood, black walnut, black birch, black cherry, sassafras, black locust, red maple, and American beech. This wide variety of trees species creates a habitat for a wide variety of woodland creatures, such as the white-tailed deer, American black bear, wild turkey, grey and red squirrels, ruffed grouse and a wide variety of birds.

The forest could be slowly changing from a deciduous forest back to the coniferous forest that it was before it was logged. The gypsy moth caterpillar caused widespread damage in the forests of Pennsylvania during the 1980s. These caterpillars feasted on the green leaves in the spring and summer and left the treetops bare. This allowed sunlight to reach the forest floor where the seeds of the white pine and hemlock had long lain dormant for want of sunlight. Now thousands of hemlock and white pine seedlings are pushing their way up and may possibly overtake the standing hardwoods.

== History ==
The land of the Joseph E. Ibberson Conservation Area is thought to have been inhabited for over 11,000 years. A nearby archaeological site is one of the largest and oldest Paleo-Indian sites in North America. Archaeologists believe that the evidence found at the site points to the fact that the Paleo-Indians were hunting caribou. Some of the stone tools were made from stone that can only be found 250 miles to the north in New York.

Over the years several different Native American tribes lived in the area. Including the Shawnee, Nanticoke, Lenape and the Iroquois and the Susquehannock who were living on the land when European settlers came to the Peters Mountain and Powell's Valley area. Thousands of artifacts, taken from the area, can be seen at the Smithsonian Institution and the Pennsylvania State Museum.

European settlers began living in the area in the early 18th century. Peter Allen built a house on the south side of the mountain in 1726. Peters Mountain is named for him. The road that crossed the mountains and valleys, the Augusta Road now Pennsylvania Route 225, was used by whites as a way to avoid potential conflict with the Indians who used a road along the nearby Susquehanna River. Allen's house was along this road and was used as a hotel, tollhouse and stagecoach stop. The house is still standing today and is the oldest house in Dauphin County.

Joseph E. Ibberson went to work for the Commonwealth of Pennsylvania after he graduated from Yale University in 1948. He developed some of the first forestry management plans for the 2,000,000 (8,093 km^{2}) of Pennsylvania state forests. Ibberson also helped to create and refine many divisions within what is now the Pennsylvania Department of Conservation and Natural Resources. He retired in 1977 but continued his work in the field of forestry on his private land in Dauphin County. He donated his land on December 9, 1998. This led to the creation of the first conservation area in the Pennsylvania Bureau of State Parks. Ibberson died in 2011. His estate donated an additional 433 acres of his land to the state in 2012, bringing the total acreage of the park to 783 in two separate tracts along Peters Mountain.

== Recreation ==
Since the Joseph E. Ibberson Conservation area is a conservation area and not a state park, recreational opportunities are limited. Park facilities that are common on most Pennsylvania state parks are not available at the conservation area. It is open to hunting, hiking and cross-country skiing.

=== Hunting ===
Hunting is permitted on about 320 acres (130 ha) of the Joseph E. Ibberson Conservation Area. Hunters are expected to follow the rules and regulations of the Pennsylvania Game Commission. Common game species are ruffed grouse, eastern gray squirrels, wild turkey, white-tailed deer, American black bear and eastern cottontail rabbits. The hunting of groundhogs is not permitted at the park.

=== Trails ===
The trails of Joseph E. Ibberson Conservation Area are open to hiking and cross country skiing. All motorized vehicles, expect those used by the park staff, are strictly prohibited from using the trails within the conservation area.

- Whitetail Trail is a "moderate" hiking trail, 1.0 mile (1.6 km) long, that is marked with pink blazes. This trail begins at the western gate of the park and connects with Victoria Trail.
- Victoria Trail is a "difficult" hiking trail, 1.8 miles (2.9 km) long, marked with royal blue blazes. This trail is very rugged and begins near the eastern boundary and crosses the park to the Appalachian Trail.
- Appalachian Trail is marked with white blazes and passes through the Joseph E. Ibberson Conservation Area for 0.5 miles (0.80 km) as it makes its way from Georgia to Maine.
- Evergreen Trail is an "easy" hiking trail, 1.1 miles (1.8 km) long. The trail is a loop in the eastern section of the park that is marked with red blazes.
- Old Sawmill Trail is an "easy" hiking trail, 0.9 miles (1.4 km) long. The trail circles the location of Baker's Sawmill which was the last operating steam sawmill in Dauphin County and is marked with yellow blazes.
- Pine Trail is an "easy" hiking trail, 0.9 miles (1.4 km) long. This trail begins at Evergreen Trail and crosses the park by way of a pond and passes through a variety of forest habitats. It is marked with lime green blazes.
- Turkey Foot Trail is an "easy" hiking trail, 0.6 miles (0.97 km) long. It is marked with lavender blazes and begins at the western end of Evergreen Trail.
- Rock Trail is a "moderate" hiking trail, 0.8 miles (1.3 km) long, that is marked with beige blazes. It passes through some very rocky areas and begins at the intersection of Evergreen, Old Sawmill, and Pine trails.
