= Pennsylvania State Game Lands Number 287 =

Park in the United States

- Location within Pennsylvania Location within the United States
- Location: Armstrong County
- Nearest town: Templeton
- Coordinates: 40°56′38″N 79°27′2″W; 40°55′5″N 79°26′58″W; 40°55′59″N 79°26′22″W; 40°53′55″N 79°27′58″W; 40°56′29″N 79°25′3″W
- Area: 2,016.08 acres (815.88 ha)
- Elevation: 1,273 feet (388 m)
- Max. elevation: 1,500 feet (460 m)
- Min. elevation: 800 feet (240 m)
- Owner: Pennsylvania Game Commission
- Website: www.pgc.pa.gov/HuntTrap/StateGameLands/Documents/SGL%20Maps/SGL__287.pdf

The Pennsylvania State Game Lands Number 287 are Pennsylvania State Game Lands in Armstrong County in Pennsylvania in the United States providing hunting, bird watching, and other activities.

== Geography ==
SGL 287 consists of a five parcels located in Boggs, Madison and Pine Townships. Mahoning Creek and Whiskey Creek pass through the Game Lands, both part of the watershed of the Allegheny River, part of the Ohio River watershed. Nearby communities include populated places Cosmus, Deanville, Dee, Frenchs Corners, Hooks, Mahoning, Morrows Corner, Reesedale, Rimer, Templeton, Tidal, and Widnoon. The highway carrying Pennsylvania Route 28 and Pennsylvania Route 66 skirts to the east and south of SGL 287.

== Statistics ==
SGL 287 was entered into the Geographic Names Information System on 1 May 1990 as identification number 1208389, its elevation is listed as 1,273 feet (388 m). Elevations range from 800 feet (240 m) to 1,500 feet (460 m). It consists of 2,016.08 acres (815.88 ha) in one parcel.

== Biology ==
Hunting and furtaking species include Black bear (Ursus americanus), Coyote (Canis latrans), deer (Odocoileus virginianus), Gray fox (Urocyon cinereoargenteus), Red fox (Vulpes vulpes), ruffed grouse (Bonasa umbellus), ring-necked pheasant (Phasianus colchicus), squirrel (Sciurus carolinensis), and turkey (Meleagris gallopavo).

== See also ==
- Pennsylvania State Game Lands
- Pennsylvania State Game Lands Number 105, also located in Armstrong County
- Pennsylvania State Game Lands Number 137, also located in Armstrong County
- Pennsylvania State Game Lands Number 247, also located in Armstrong County
- Pennsylvania State Game Lands Number 259, also located in Armstrong County
