= Stony Valley Railroad Grade =

- Length: 21.5 mi (34.6 km)
- Location: Ellendale to Lebanon Reservoir
- Trailheads: Lebanon Reservoir; Ellendale
- Use: Hiking, Biking, Equestrian, Hunting, Cross Country Skiing, Snowmobiling, Fishing
- Difficulty: Moderate, level, Not handicap accessible
- Season: Year-round
- Surface: dirt, gravel

The Stony Valley Railroad Grade (SVRG) is a rail trail that stretches along 21.5 miles through Dauphin, Lebanon, and Schuylkill counties for 21.5 miles, from Ellendale to the Lebanon Reservoir, traveling through 44,342 acres of state game land. The Appalachian Trail crosses through the SVRG at Rausch Creek, which is located near what used to be the town of Rausch Gap.

Trail visitors can expect to see a plethora of wildlife as they travel through nearly 22 miles of land. Horseback riding, fishing, biking, hunting and hiking are all available to visitors. Also, cross country skiing and snowmobiling is possible during the winter months. Unique to trails in Pennsylvania, the SVRG is available for use by motor vehicles one day out of the year. Minimal traffic can be expected on the trail as travelers make their way through a densely wooded path. The trail is open seven days a week from dawn until dusk, however, the trail is closed to horseback and bicycle riding during hunting season.

== Historical development ==
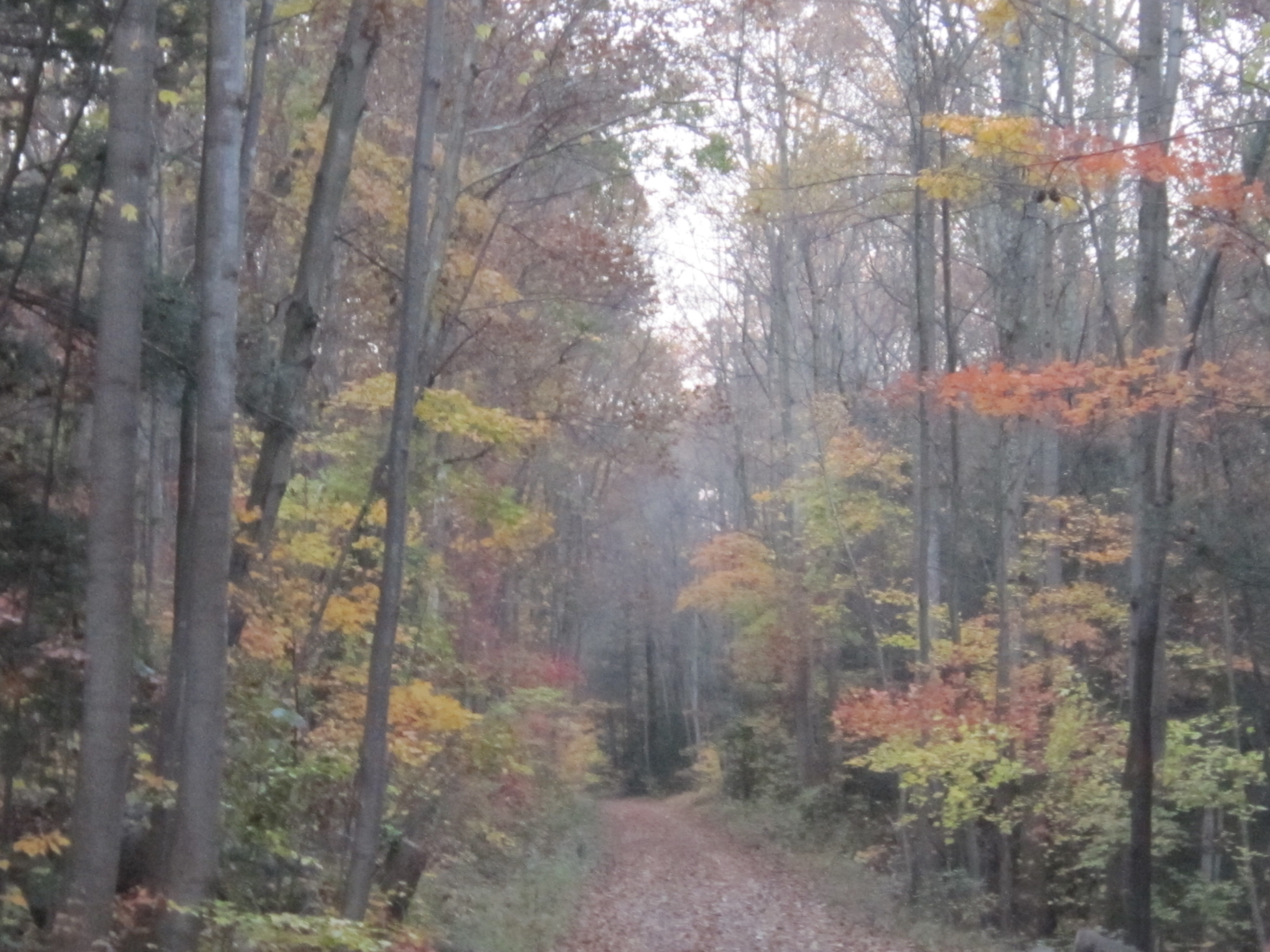
The Stony Valley Railroad Grade travels through the secluded woodland of Dauphin, Lebanon, and Schuylkill County.

=== Historical significance ===
The Stony Creek Valley was originally settled in 1824 after the discovery of coal and due to the availability of fresh waters from Cold Springs. The abundance of coal in the valley led to the creation of the Schuylkill & Susquehanna Railroad during the 1850s. The railroad was also used to bring tourists to the valley in search of fresh mineral waters. A 200-room resort was built at this time which later burnt down as the regions resources depleted. The towns that once rested along this stretch such as Yellow Springs, Rausch Gap, Cold Springs, Gold Mine and a former railroad stop, Water Tank. All of which are now considered ghost towns, have long been gone. Ellendale (present day Ellendale Forge) and White Springs, geographically exist today as clusters of mountainside private homes along the Stony Valley Trail near Stony Creek.

=== Trail’s history and evolution ===
The land on which the SVRG rests was purchased by the Pennsylvania Game Commission in 1945. The Game Commission converted the Schuylkill and Susquehanna Railroad corridor into one of the nation's first rail trails. Since that time, the trail has yet to evolve. The occasional upkeep of washouts and clearing of blockages provides the only attention to the trail.

== Trail development ==
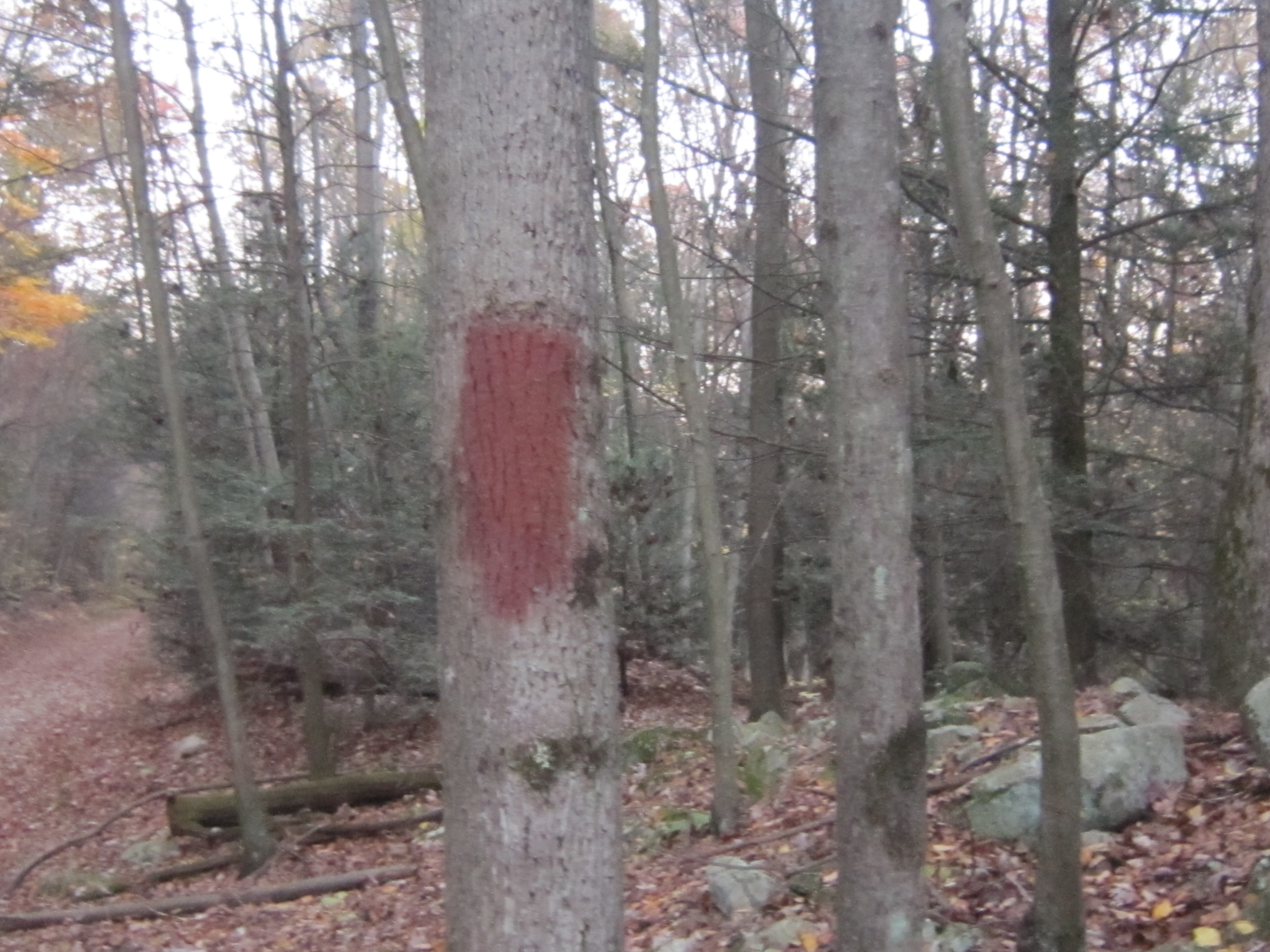
Trail markings are visible along the trail to assist travelers.

=== Design and construction ===
The SVRG is roughly eight feet wide and its surface consists of dirt and gravel. The trail, although rough, is mostly level throughout its entirety. Due to the roughness of the trail it is not wheel-chair accessible. Wooded area surrounds the trail, which is not well marked at any point.

=== Trail amenities ===
The SVRG lacks many of the amenities that other trails in the state offer. Parking is available at the trailheads, however, the area does not provide room for more than a few vehicles. The 21.5 mile trail does not offer bathrooms or any benches or picnic areas to provide rest for trail goers. This underdeveloped trail, mostly untouched by man, offers a nature walk for visitors.

== Community ==
=== Trail supporters ===
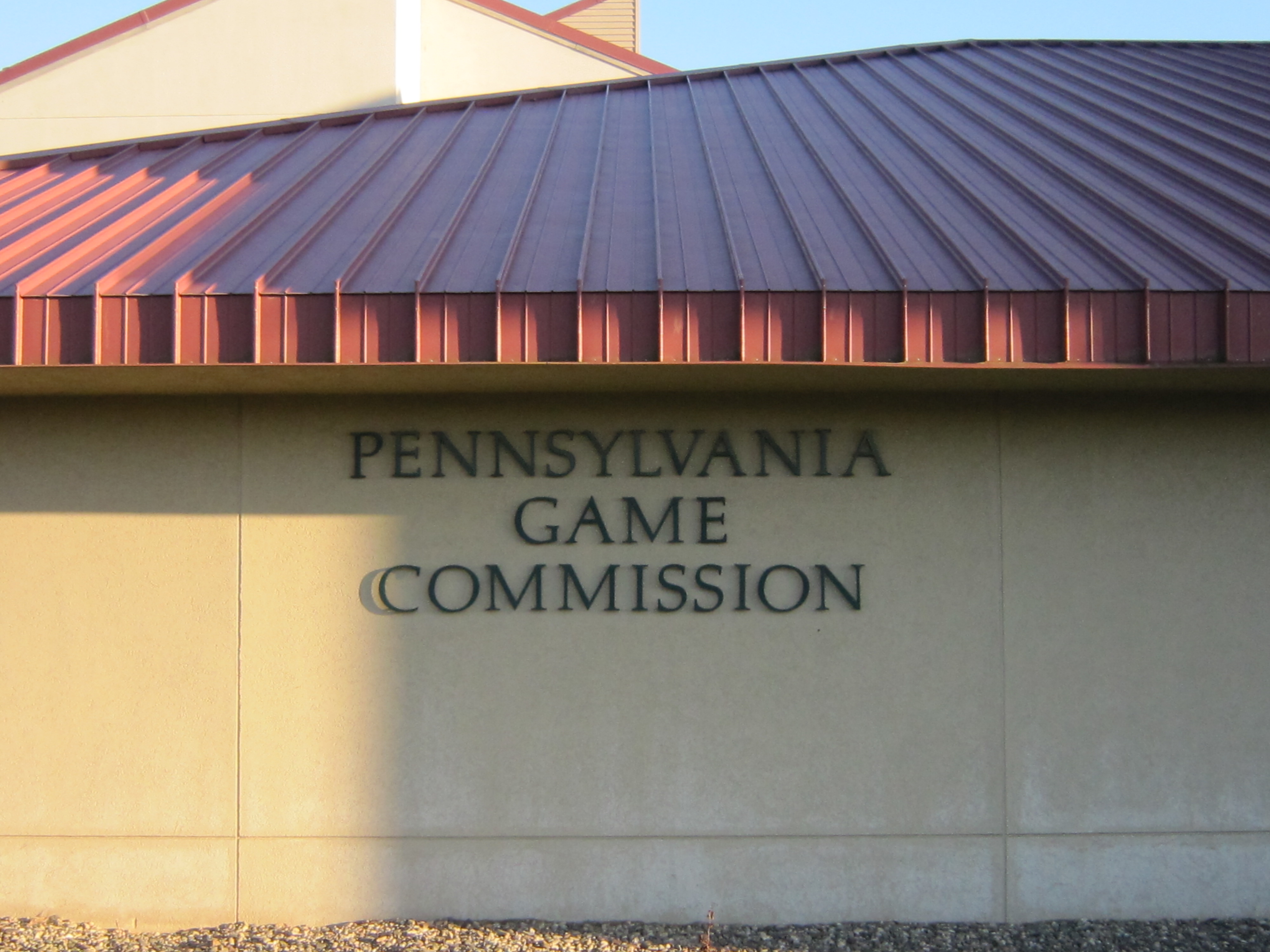
The SVRG is run through state game land, which is overseen by the Pennsylvania Game Commission

The SVRG is overseen by the Pennsylvania Game Commission. The SVRG is not supported by the local community, and does not show signs of advancement opportunities. Possibly, the only opportunity comes at the hand of the rails-to-trails conservancy, which has an ultimate goal of connecting trails from former rail lines nationwide.

=== Special events ===
The SVRG does not support any organized special events. Despite this, the trail does offer cross country skiing and snowmobiling, which is not often available in trails throughout Pennsylvania. Also, each fall, motor vehicles are permitted on the trail one day a year, which is unique amongst trails in Pennsylvania.
