= Pennsylvania State Game Lands Number 137 =

Park in the United States

- Location within Pennsylvania Location within the United States
- Location: Armstrong County
- Nearest town: New Bethlehem; South Bethlehem
- Coordinates: 40°59′6″N 79°20′35″W
- Area: 1,134.79 acres (459.23 ha)
- Elevation: 1,384 feet (422 m)
- Max. elevation: 1,943 feet (592 m)
- Min. elevation: 920 feet (280 m)
- Owner: Pennsylvania Game Commission
- Website: www.pgc.pa.gov/HuntTrap/StateGameLands/Documents/SGL%20Maps/SGL__134.pdf

The Pennsylvania State Game Lands Number 137 are Pennsylvania State Game Lands in Armstrong County in Pennsylvania in the United States providing hunting, bird watching, and other activities.

== Geography ==
SGL 137 consists of a single parcel located in Mahoning Township. It lies in the watershed of Redbank Creek and Mahoning Creek, both draining to the Allegheny River, part of the Ohio River watershed. Nearby communities include the boroughs of New Bethlehem and South Bethlehem and the populated places Climax, Cottage Hill, Distant, Fairmount City, and Saint Charles. The highway carrying Pennsylvania Route 28 and Pennsylvania Route 66 passes through the Game Lands, Pennsylvania Route 861 runs north of the Game Lands.

== Statistics ==
SGL 137 was entered into the Geographic Names Information System on 2 August 1979 as identification number 1188446, its elevation is listed as 1,384 feet (422 m). Elevations range from 1,120 feet (340 m) to 1,591 feet (485 m). It consists of 1,134.79 acres (459.23 ha) in one parcel.

== Biology ==
Hunting and furtaking species include bear (Ursus americanus), Bobcat (Lynx rufus), Coyote (Canis latrans), deer (Odocoileus virginianus), Gray fox (Urocyon cinereoargenteus), Red fox (Vulpes vulpes), grouse (Bonasa umbellus), mink (Neovison vison), Raccoon (Procyoon lotor), squirrel (Sciurus carolinensis), and turkey (Meleagris gallopavo). The habitat management goal of SGL 137 is to favor requirements for deer and grouse, which coincides with the non-game focus for aspen stands, interior forest conditions as well as forested riparian areas.

== See also ==
- Pennsylvania State Game Lands
- Pennsylvania State Game Lands Number 105, also located in Armstrong County
- Pennsylvania State Game Lands Number 247, also located in Armstrong County
- Pennsylvania State Game Lands Number 259, also located in Armstrong County
- Pennsylvania State Game Lands Number 287, also located in Armstrong County
