= Pennsylvania State Game Lands Number 44 =

Park in the United States

- Location within Pennsylvania Location within the United States
- Location: Elk County
- Coordinates: 41°19′53″N 78°49′21″W; 41°19′3″N 78°39′59″W; 41°19′4″N 78°40′59″W; 41°20′14″N 78°40′36″W; 41°20′44″N 78°40′59″W
- Area: 39,400 acres (15,900 ha)
- Elevation: 1,919 feet (585 m)
- Max. elevation: 2,267 feet (691 m)
- Min. elevation: 1,360 feet (410 m)
- Owner: Pennsylvania Game Commission

The Pennsylvania State Game Lands Number 44 are Pennsylvania State Game Lands in Elk County in Pennsylvania in the United States providing hunting, bird watching, and other activities.

== Geography ==
State Game Lands Number 44 is located in Horton, Ridgway and Spring Creek Townships in Elk County.

Horton Ridgway Spring Creek

== Statistics ==
SGL 44 was entered into the Geographic Names Information System on 2 August 1979 as identification number 1210008, elevation is listed as 1,919 feet (585 m).
