= Pennsylvania Game Commission =

Wildlife conservation agency

Agency overview
- Formed: 1895; 131 years ago
- Jurisdiction: Commonwealth of Pennsylvania
- Headquarters: Harrisburg, Pennsylvania
- Employees: <900 - 2023; 1,000+ part time & volunteer
- Annual budget: $266,532,308 Fiscal Year 2022 (Note: The PGC does not receive General Fund appropriations from the state legislator.)
- Agency executives: Stephen Smith, Executive Director; David J. Gustafson, Deputy Executive Director; David Mitchell, Deputy Director of Field Operations
- Website: www.pgc.pa.gov

The Pennsylvania Game Commission (PGC) is the state agency responsible for wildlife conservation and management in Pennsylvania in the United States. It was originally founded in 1895 and currently utilizes more than 700 full-time employees and thousands of part-time and volunteers in its official mission to "manage and protect wildlife and their habitats while promoting hunting and trapping for current and future generations."

== History ==
In the late 1800s as a result of deforestation, pollution and unregulated hunting/trapping, wildlife decreased in population and diversity. The wildlife, then-commonly referred to as "game," was to be protected by establishing the Game Commission in 1895 by the state Legislature. It was—and still is—funded primarily through the sale of licenses, State Game Land natural resource revenue, and a federal excise tax on guns and ammunition.

== Game wardens ==
Game Warden vehicle in Harrisburg, PA.

The main workforce of the Pennsylvania Game Commission are game wardens, formerly known as wildlife conservation officers (and originally game protectors).

Game Wardens serve as sworn law enforcement officers for wildlife crimes, enforcing the hunting/trapping and conservation laws. They patrol the Pennsylvania State Game Lands and teach hunter-trapper education courses as well as providing many other educational opportunities for the Pennsylvania public, including wildlife programs for schools and community organizations.

Initial training for game wardens occurs at the Ross Leffler School of Conservation in Harrisburg. New recruiting classes are formed when positions open up, which is normally every 2nd or 3rd year. Classes are usually kept below 30 students. Training is an 11-month program in Law Enforcement, Natural Resource Management, Wildlife Management, and other subjects.

Deputy game wardens are part-time, whereas state game wardens are full-time, career-oriented positions. Serving as a deputy does not lead to promotion into a state game warden position. Deputies function in all phases of Game Commission activities and assume the powers as authorized by the Game and Wildlife Code, subject to limitations established by Commission regulations and operating procedures.

Deputies are commonly involved in: law enforcement patrols and investigations, answering complaints and calls for service, nuisance wildlife control, hunter-trapper education classes, educational programs, and assisting other agencies.

=== Fallen wardens ===
Pennsylvania Game Commission patch

Previous Pennsylvania Game Commission patch

Since the establishment of the Pennsylvania Game Commission, eleven Game Wardens have died while on duty.

Rank	Name	End of Watch	Cause of death	Ref
Game Protector	L. Seeley Houk	March 2, 1906	Shot by leader of an organized crime ring in Hillsville while issuing a game citation.	
Deputy Game Protector	Charles Beecham	November 4, 1906	Shot attempting to arrest a man near Scranton for hunting on a Sunday.	
Game Protector	Joseph McHugh	November 7, 1915	Shot while searching for poachers in Carbon County.	
Field Superintendent	Elias W. "Woody" Kelly	August 10, 1919	Struck by train in Warren County while inspecting state game preserves.	
Chief Game Protector	Joseph H. Kalbfus	August 10, 1919	Struck by train in Warren County while inspecting state game preserves.	
Deputy Game Protector	Darrell S. Solida	December 6, 1931	Shot while investigating an illegal deer kill near Troutville.	
Game Protector	Walter M. Middleton	December 1, 1935	Vehicle accident while en route to assist other officers during deer hunting season.	
Game Protector	John B. Ross	July 18, 1942	Boat capsized while rescuing citizens of Port Allegany during flood.	
Game Protector	Robert E. Zimmerman	May 13, 1957	Vehicle accident en route to a Divisional Office	
Land Management Officer	Woodrow E. Portzline	October 24, 1973	Heart attack while investigating reports of trespassing and poaching at a farm.	
Wildlife Conservation Officer	David L. Grove	November 11, 2010	Shot in Freedom Township, Adams County while investigating reports of ongoing nighttime shooting and poaching.	

== Official game publications ==
- Pennsylvania Game News is the PGC's monthly publication, dealing with wildlife conservation and the financial and legislative functions of the Game Commission. The publication has frequently featured the work of wildlife artists, including Jacob Bates Abbott in the 1940s.
- Monthly Field Notes is written by Game Wardens and their Deputies, which are comedic stories about happenings in the fields. They are a well received feature of the publication.
- Hunting & Trapping Digest is a complimentary publication received by those who purchase hunting or trapping licenses for the respective year.

== See also ==
- List of law enforcement agencies in Pennsylvania
- Pennsylvania Fish and Boat Commission
- List of state and territorial fish and wildlife management agencies in the United States
