= Tom Sherman (American football) =

American gridiron football player (born 1945)

No. 14, 19, 11
- Position: Quarterback

Personal information
- Born: December 5, 1945 (age 80); Bellevue, Pennsylvania, U.S.
- Listed height: 6 ft 0 in (1.83 m)
- Listed weight: 190 lb (86 kg)

Career information
- High school: Union (Rimersburg, Pennsylvania)
- College: Penn State (1964-1967)
- NFL draft: 1968: undrafted

Career history
- Boston Patriots (1968-1969); Buffalo Bills (1969); Hartford Knights (1970-1973); New York Stars/Charlotte Hornets (1974-1975); Calgary Stampeders (1976)

Career AFL statistics
- Passing attempts: 228
- Passing completions: 92
- Completion percentage: 40.4%
- TD–INT: 13–16
- Passing yards: 1,219
- Passer rating: 47.8
- Stats at Pro Football Reference

Thomas Joseph Sherman (born December 5, 1945) was an American football quarterback for the American Football League's Cincinnati Bengals (1968), Boston Patriots (1968–69), and Buffalo Bills (1969). In two seasons in the AFL, he played in 19 games and completed 92 of 228 passes for 1,219 yards, 13 touchdowns and 16 interceptions. He also had 58 rushing attempts for 468 yards and one touchdown.

Sherman signed with the New York Stars of the World Football League in 1974. The Stars moved to Charlotte, North Carolina midway through the 1974 WFL season and became the Hornets. Sherman played for the Charlotte Hornets in 1975, until the league folded in the twelfth week of the season on October 22, 1975.
