= Pennsylvania Route 861 =

State highway in Clarion County, Pennsylvania, US

Pennsylvania Route 861

Route information
- Maintained by PennDOT
- Length: 11.67 mi (18.78 km)
- Existed: 1928–present

Major junctions
- West end: PA 68 in Rimersburg
- East end: PA 66 in New Bethlehem

Location
- Country: United States
- State: Pennsylvania
- Counties: Clarion

Highway system
- Pennsylvania State Route System; Interstate; US; State; Scenic; Legislative
| ← PA 860 | → PA 862 |

Pennsylvania Route 861 (PA 861) is a 11.67-mile-long (18.78 km) state highway located in Clarion County in Pennsylvania. The western terminus is at PA 68 in Rimersburg. The eastern terminus is at PA 66 in New Bethlehem.

== Route description ==
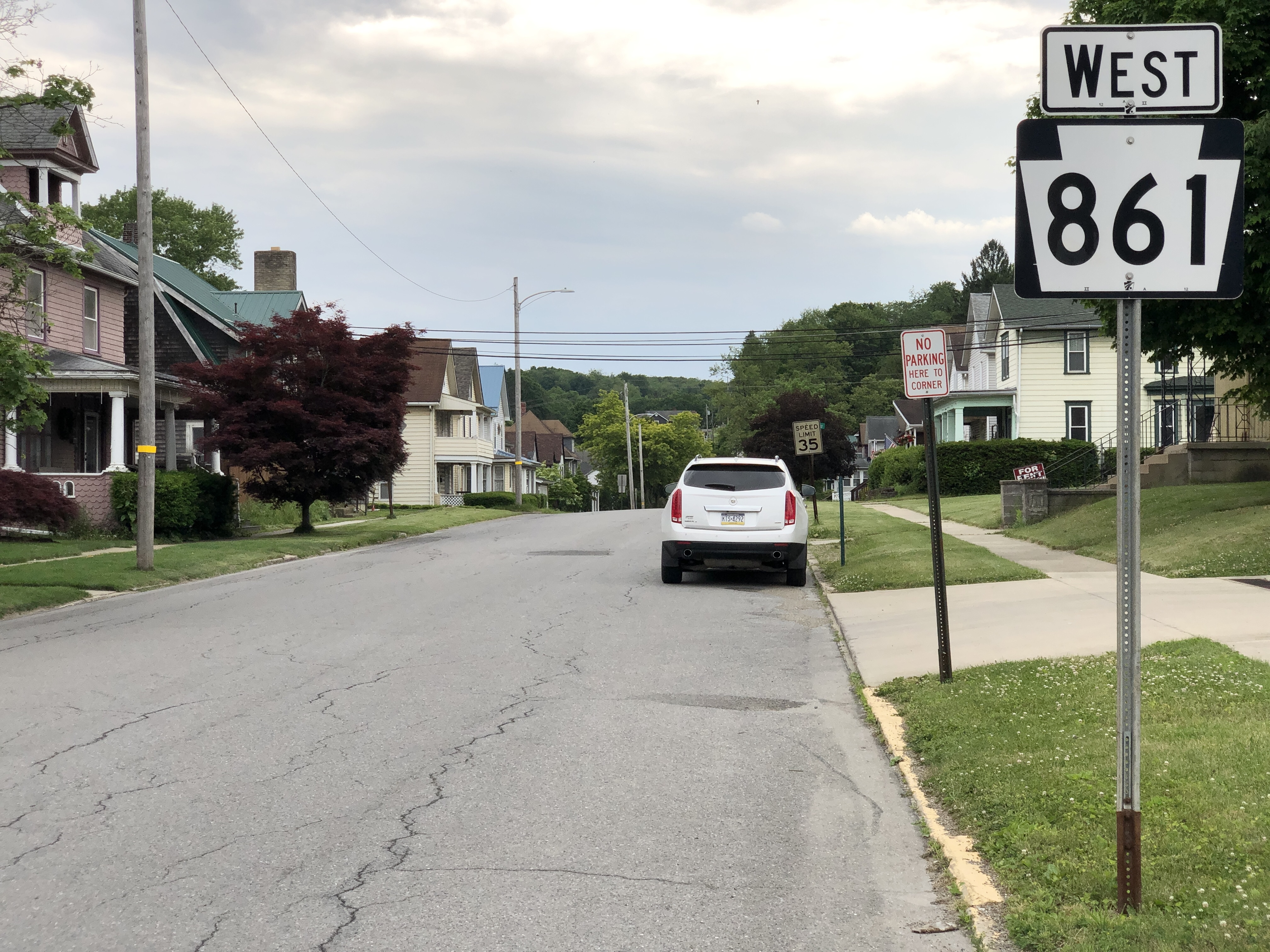
PA 861 westbound in New Bethlehem

PA 861 begins at an intersection with PA 68 in the borough of Rimersburg, heading southeast on a two-lane undivided road. The route heads into Toby Township and runs through forests, soon crossing into Madison Township. The road curves south, passing through Diamond before making a turn to the east and continuing into agricultural areas. PA 861 enters Porter Township and continues east through a mix of farmland and woodland with occasional homes. The route heads to the southeast through more rural areas before curving east and heading into the borough of New Bethlehem. At this point, the PA 861 becomes Penn Street and passes homes, ending at an intersection with PA 66.

== Major intersections ==
The entire route is in Clarion County.

| Location | mi | km | Destinations | Notes |
|---|---|---|---|---|
| Rimersburg | 0.00 | 0.00 | PA 68 (Main Street) – East Brady, Clarion | Western terminus |
| New Bethlehem | 11.67 | 18.78 | PA 66 (Wood Street) – Clarion, Kittanning | Eastern terminus |
1.000 mi = 1.609 km; 1.000 km = 0.621 mi
