= North Clarion County Junior/Senior High School =

School in Pennsylvania, United States

Coordinates: 41.39503°N 79.35418°W

Location
- 10439 State Rte. 36; Tionesta, Clarion County, Pennsylvania 16353; United States

Information
- School type: Public Junior/Senior High School
- School district: North Clarion County
- Superintendent: Steven Young
- Faculty: 26
- Grades: 7-12
- Enrollment: 327 (2009-10 School Term)
  - Grade 7: 63
  - Grade 8: 55
  - Grade 9: 46
  - Grade 10: 58
  - Grade 11: 62
  - Grade 12: 62
- Average class size: 13:1
- Colors: Purple and Gold
- Athletics conference: PIAA District IX
- Mascot: Wolves
- Team name: Wolves
- Rival: Keystone Panthers
- Feeder schools: North Clarion County Elementary School

North Clarion County Junior/Senior High School is a public Junior/Senior High School in rural northern Clarion County, Pennsylvania. It has 346 Students and 26 faculty members.

== Graduation Requirements ==
Students at North Clarion must obtain 24 Credits of coursework in Grades 9-12, satisfactorily complete an Graduation Project, and pass the PSSA's in order to graduate.

=== Credit Structure ===
Subject Area	#/Credits	Notes
English	4.0	
Social Studies	4.0	Must include: American History II, American Government/Law, Economics, Elective
Science	4.0	Must include: Biology
Math	4.0	Must include: Algebra I, Algebra II and Geometry.
Arts and Humanities	2.0	
Physical Education	1.5	
Health Education	0.5	
Elective Courses	4.0	
TOTAL	24.0	

=== Courses Available ===
- English
- World Geography
- Mathematics
- Science
- History
- Foreign Languages - Including courses in French and Spanish
- Business Education - Including courses in Desktop Publishing and Multimedia
- Industrial Technology - Including Drafting
- Art
- Physical Education - PE in Grades 9-11 includes instruction in Drug & Alcohol issues
- Health
- Driver's Education
- Music - Chorus and Band are the only areas of instruction offered at North Clarion

== Athletics ==
North Clarion Participates in District IX 9 of the PIAA and is in the KSAC Conference.

Sport Name	Boys	Girls
Baseball	Class A	
Basketball	Class A	Class A
Cross country	Class AA	Class AA
Track and Field	Class AA	Class AA
Volleyball		Class A
