= Union High School (Pennsylvania) =

Coordinates: 41.0344°N 79.5002°W

- Aerial shot of Union High School in 2022

Location
- 354 Baker Street; Rimersburg, Pennsylvania 16248; United States

Information
- Motto: Home of the Knights and Damsels
- Principal: Andrew Carlson
- Faculty: 25
- Grades: 7th - 12th
- Enrollment: 292 (2023-24)
- Colors: Blue and gold
- Athletics conference: PIAA District IX
- Nickname: Golden Knights (men's sports), Golden Damsels (women's sports)
- Feeder schools: Rimersburg Elementary School
- Website: Union High School Webpage

Union High School is a small, public High School, located in Rimersburg, Clarion County. The school is part of the Union School District. The school campus is home to approximately 375 students and 30 Faculty Members. Students, at their choosing, have the opportunity to attend Clarion County Career Center if they desire to pursue a vocational trade.

== Extracurriculars ==
Union School District offers students a variety of clubs, activities and sports. Beginning in 2016, the Allegheny-Clarion Valley School District entered into an athletic co-op agreement with the Union School District with regard to football, cross country, and golf. Under the agreement, Union High School would act as the host school for football (Though games are expected to be played at both schools evenly), while A-C Valley is the host school for golf and cross-country.

=== Athletics ===
Union participates in PIAA District IX (9)

Sport Name	Boys	Girls
Baseball	Class A	
Basketball	Class A	Class A
Cross country	Class AA	Class AA
Football	Class A	
Golf	Class AAAA	Class AAAA
Track and Field	Class AA	Class AA
Volleyball		Class A
