= Elk Township, Pennsylvania =

Elk Township is the name of several places in the U.S. state of Pennsylvania:

- Elk Township, Chester County, Pennsylvania
- Elk Township, Clarion County, Pennsylvania
- Elk Township, Tioga County, Pennsylvania
- Elk Township, Warren County, Pennsylvania

== See also ==
- Elk Creek Township, Erie County, Pennsylvania
- Elk Lick Township, Somerset County, Pennsylvania
- Elkland Township, Sullivan County, Pennsylvania
