= OSTC =

OSTC may refer to:

- Oakland Schools Technical Campus, Michigan, US
- Oligosaccharyltransferase complex subunit, human protein
- Open Source Technology Center, run by Intel
- Opportunity Scholarship Tax Credit, scholarship program in Pennsylvania, US
- Owen Sound Transportation Company, Ontario, Canada
