= Vowinckel =

Vowinckel may refer to:

== People with the surname ==
- Antje Vowinckel (born 1964), German sound artist, radio artist, and musician
- Ernst Vowinckel (1828–1904), German businessman and member of the Reichstag
- Hans-August Vowinckel (1906–1941), German writer
- Helga Vowinckel (1930–1986), German nuclear power opponent

== Places ==
- Vowinckel, Pennsylvania, a census-designated place in Clarion County, Pennsylvania, USA

== See also ==
- Vohwinkel (disambiguation)
