= Keystone School District =

School district in Pennsylvania

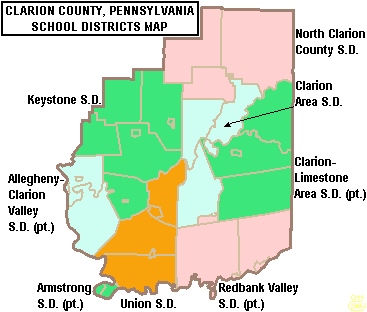

Address
- 451 Huston Avenue Knox, Pennsylvania; United States

District information
- Type: Public
- Established: 1955 or 1956 as a jointure with the current high school and five satellite elementary schools. The current elementary school was built in 1972, thus closing satellite schools.
- Superintendent: Michael Hall

Students and staff
- District mascot: Panther
- Colors: White, Black and Gold

Other information
- Website: keyknox.com

The Keystone School District is a small, rural public school district in Clarion County, Pennsylvania. It serves the boroughs of Shippenville, Knox, and Callensburg, as well as the townships of Beaver Township, Elk Township, Licking Township, Ashland Township, and Salem Township. The Keystone School District encompasses approximately 126 square miles. According to 2000 federal census data, it serves a resident population of 7,589. In 2009, the district residents' per capita income was $16,347, while the median family income was $39,271.

The Keystone School District operates two schools: an elementary school and a combined junior/senior high school, both of which are located in Knox.

== Extracurriculars ==
The district provides a wide variety of clubs, activities and 18 interscholastic sports.

=== High School Athletics ===
Keystone participates in PIAA District IX (9)

| Sport Name | Boys | Girls |
|---|---|---|
| Baseball / Softball | Class A | Class A |
| Basketball | Class AA | Class AA |
| Cross country | Class AA | Class AA |
| Football | Class A | |
| Golf | Class AAAA | Class AAAA |
| Soccer | Class A | Class A |
| Track and Field | Class AA | Class AA |
| Volleyball | | Class A |
| Wrestling | Class AA | |
