= Tylersburg, Pennsylvania =

Unincorporated community in Pennsylvania, US

- Census designated place
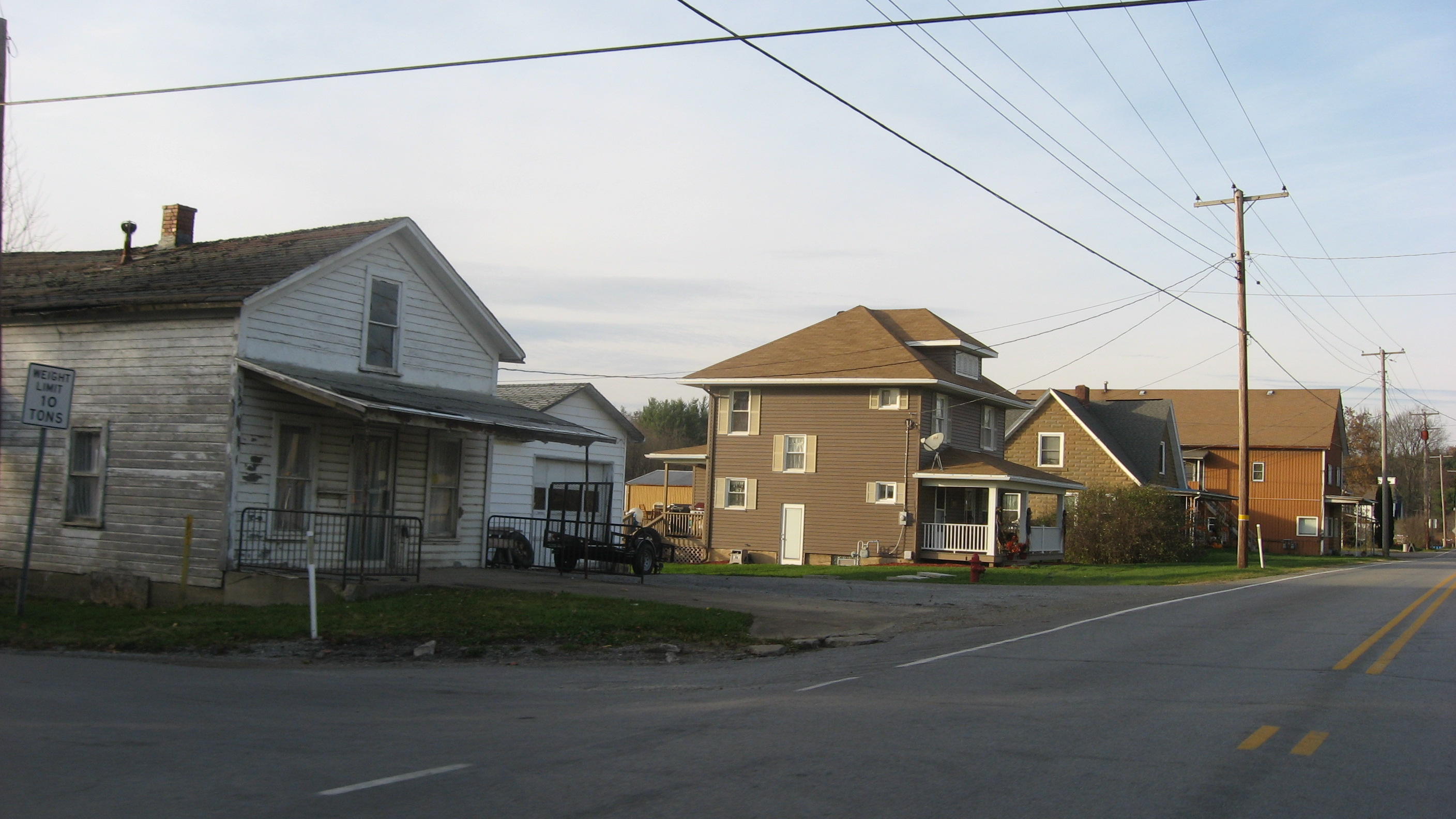
- Route 36 in central Tylersburg

- Location within Pennsylvania Location within the United States
- Coordinates: 41°23′01″N 79°19′13″W
- Country: United States
- State: Pennsylvania
- County: Clarion
- Township: Farmington

Area
  - Total: 0.59 sq mi (1.54 km^{2})
  - Land: 0.59 sq mi (1.53 km^{2})
  - Water: 0.0039 sq mi (0.01 km^{2})
- Elevation: 1,568 ft (478 m)

Population (2010)
  - Total: 196
  - Density: 332/sq mi (128.1/km^{2})
- Time zone: UTC-5 (Eastern (EST))
  - Summer (DST): UTC-4 (EDT)
- ZIP code: 16361
- FIPS code: 42-78120
- GNIS feature ID: 2630044

Tylersburg is a census-designated place located in Farmington Township, Clarion County, Pennsylvania, United States. The community is located along Pennsylvania Route 36 in northern Clarion County, about 2 miles (3 km) northwest of Leeper. As of the 2010 census the population was 196.
