= Clarion Area School District =

School district in Pennsylvania, US

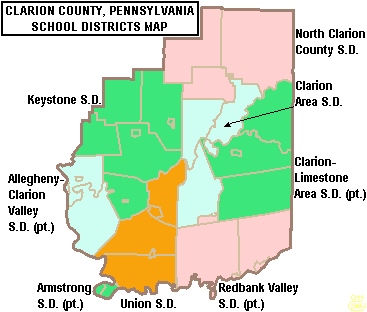

Address
- 221 Liberty Street Clarion, Clarion County, Pennsylvania, 16214-1809; United States

District information
- Type: Public

Other information
- Website: https://www.clarion-schools.com/

The Clarion Area School District is a small, rural public school district which covers the Borough of Clarion, Highland Township, and Paint Township as well as most of Monroe Township in Clarion County, Pennsylvania. It encompasses approximately 71 square miles (180 km^{2}). According to 2000 federal census data, it serves a resident population of 10,183. By 2010, the district's population declined to 8,978 people. In 2009, the district residents' per capita income was $14,302, while the median family income was $43,665. In the Commonwealth, the median family income was $49,501 and the United States median family income was $49,445, in 2010. By 2013, the median household income in the United States rose to $52,100.

The Clarion Area School District operates just two schools: Clarion Area Jr/Sr High School (7th-12th) and Clarion Area Elementary School (K-6th). For students who wish to learn a vocational trade, the Clarion Area School District is associated with the Clarion County Career Center. The Riverview Intermediate Unit IU6 provides the district with a wide variety of services like specialized education for disabled students and hearing, speech and visual disability services and professional development for staff and faculty.

== Extracurriculars ==
The district offers a wide variety of clubs, activities and sports.

=== Sports ===
The district funds:

Varsity

Boys

- Baseball - A
- Basketball- A
- Cross Country - A
- Football (co-op with Clarion Limestone and North Clarion) - AA
- Golf - AAAA
- Track and Field - AA
- Wrestling - AA

Girls

- Basketball - A
- Cheer - AAAA
- Cross Country - A
- Golf - AA
- Soccer (Fall) - A
- Softball - A
- Track and Field - AA
- Volleyball - A

Junior High Middle School Sports

Boys

- Baseball
- Basketball
- Cross Country
- Football
- Golf
- Track and Field
- Wrestling

Girls

- Basketball
- Cheer
- Cross Country
- Golf
- Soccer (Fall)
- Softball
- Track and Field
- Volleyball

According to PIAA directory July 2013
