= Toby Township, Pennsylvania =

Township in Pennsylvania, US

Coordinates: 41°04′22″N 79°31′13″W

- Township
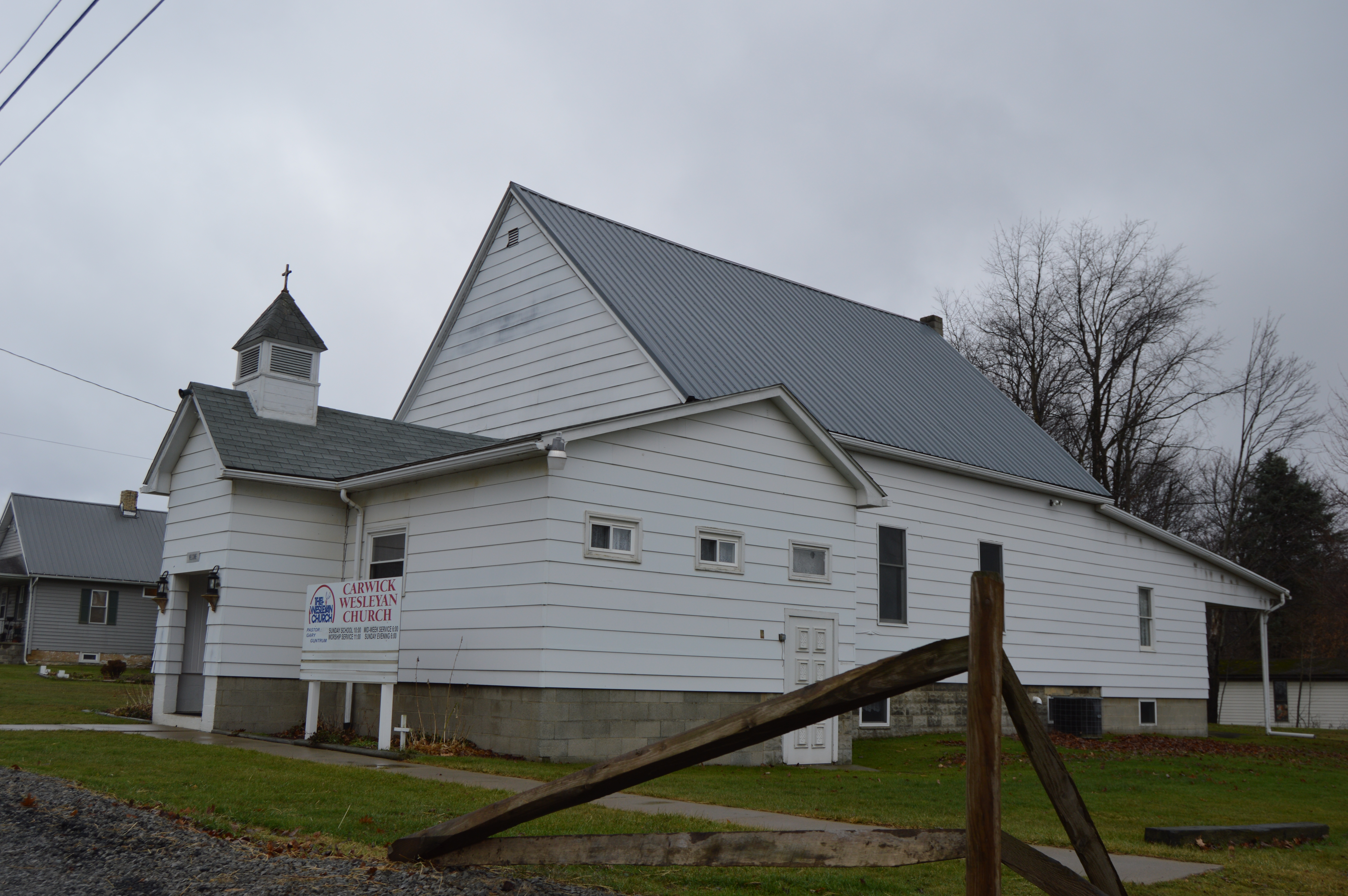
- Carwick Wesleyan Church

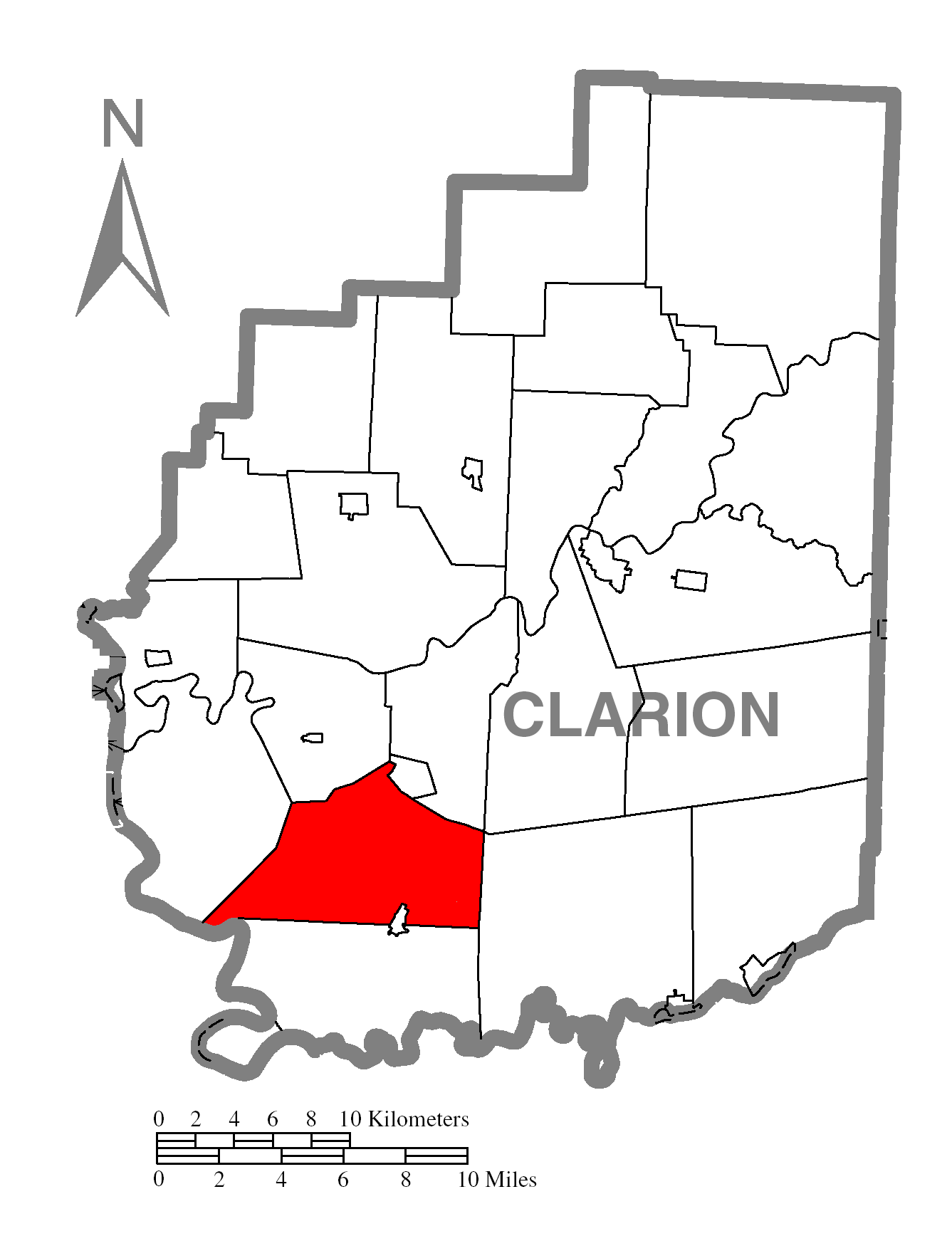
- Map of Clarion County, Pennsylvania highlighting Toby Township

- Map of Clarion County, Pennsylvania
- Country: United States
- State: Pennsylvania
- County: Clarion
- Settled: 1797

Area
  - Total: 29.37 sq mi (76.08 km^{2})
  - Land: 29.04 sq mi (75.22 km^{2})
  - Water: 0.33 sq mi (0.86 km^{2})

Population (2020)
  - Total: 984
  - Estimate (2021): 980
  - Density: 32.5/sq mi (12.54/km^{2})
- Time zone: UTC-5 (Eastern (EST))
  - Summer (DST): UTC-4 (EDT)
- FIPS code: 42-031-76928

Toby Township is a township in Clarion County, Pennsylvania, United States. The population was 984 at the 2020 census, a decrease from the figure of 991 in 2010 census, which was, in turn, a decline from 1,166 at the 2000 census.

== Geography ==
The township is located in southwestern Clarion County; the township's western end is bordered on the south by the Allegheny River, which forms the boundary with Armstrong County. The borough of Rimersburg is located along the southern boundary of the township but is a separate municipality. The borough of Sligo is along the northeastern border. According to the United States Census Bureau, the township has a total area of 29.4 square miles (76.1 km^{2}), of which 29.0 square miles (75.2 km^{2}) is land and 0.35 square miles (0.9 km^{2}), or 1.14%, is water.

== Demographics ==
Historical population
Census	Pop.	Note	%±
2010	991		—
2020	984		−0.7%
2021 (est.)	980		−0.4%
U.S. Decennial Census

As of the census of 2000, there were 1,166 people, 443 households, and 339 families residing in the township. The population density was 40.3 inhabitants per square mile (15.6/km^{2}). There were 501 housing units at an average density of 17.3/sq mi (6.7/km^{2}). The racial makeup of the township was 99.06% White, 0.43% African American, 0.09% Native American, and 0.43% from two or more races. Hispanic or Latino of any race were 0.34% of the population.

There were 443 households, out of which 32.1% had children under the age of 18 living with them, 61.4% were married couples living together, 9.9% had a female householder with no husband present, and 23.3% were non-families. 20.3% of all households were made up of individuals, and 10.2% had someone living alone who was 65 years of age or older. The average household size was 2.63 and the average family size was 2.96.

In the township the population was spread out, with 26.2% under the age of 18, 7.5% from 18 to 24, 28.0% from 25 to 44, 24.6% from 45 to 64, and 13.8% who were 65 years of age or older. The median age was 38 years. For every 100 females there were 98.6 males. For every 100 females age 18 and over, there were 97.9 males.

The median income for a household in the township was $28,580, and the median income for a family was $31,650. Males had a median income of $26,579 versus $18,036 for females. The per capita income for the township was $14,380. About 10.7% of families and 12.3% of the population were below the poverty line, including 16.0% of those under age 18 and 5.1% of those age 65 or over.
