= Crown, Pennsylvania =

Unincorporated community in Pennsylvania, US

- Census designated place
- Location in Pennsylvania Crown (the United States)
- Coordinates: 41°23′30″N 79°15′48″W
- Country: United States
- State: Pennsylvania
- County: Clarion
- Township: Farmington

Area
  - Total: 2.55 sq mi (6.61 km^{2})
  - Land: 2.54 sq mi (6.57 km^{2})
  - Water: 0.015 sq mi (0.04 km^{2})
- Elevation: 1,657 ft (505 m)

Population (2020)
  - Total: 201
  - Density: 79.3/sq mi (30.61/km^{2})
- Time zone: UTC-5 (Eastern (EST))
  - Summer (DST): UTC-4 (EDT)
- ZIP codes: 16220
- FIPS code: 42-17440
- GNIS feature ID: 2630003

Crown is a census-designated place in Farmington Township, Clarion County, in the U.S. state of Pennsylvania. The community is located along Pennsylvania Route 66 in northern Clarion County. As of the 2010 census the population was 183.

== Demographics ==
Historical population
Census	Pop.	Note	%±
2020	201		—
U.S. Decennial Census
