= Clarion Area High School =

Public school in Clarion, Pennsylvania, US

Coordinates: 41.21786°N 79.38970°W

Location
- 219 Liberty St. Clarion, Pennsylvania 16214

Information
- School type: Public Junior/Senior High School
- School district: Clarion Area
- Superintendent: Joe Carrico
- Principal: Roger Walter
- Faculty: 28.31 (FTE)
- Grades: 6th – 12th
- Student to teacher ratio: 14.80
- Colors: Orange and Black
- Athletics conference: PIAA District IX / KSAC
- Mascot: Bobcats
- Rival: Clarion-Limestone Lions, Keystone Panthers, North Clarion Wolves
- Accreditation: Middle States Association of Colleges and Schools
- Feeder schools: Clarion Area Elementary School

Clarion Area High School is a public junior and senior high school in Clarion, Pennsylvania. The school went through its last addition and renovation process in 1997, at which time, modern technology was added to the school's curriculum. Part-time vocational training is held at Clarion County Career Center, and 65% of students pursue one or more extra-curricular activities. The school has won state championships in baseball, track and field, volleyball, and have been runners-ups in basketball, football, and softball.

== Athletics ==
Clarion Area participates in Pennsylvania Interscholastic Athletic Association District 9.

Sport Name	Boys	Girls
Baseball / Softball	Class A	Class A
Basketball	Class AA	Class AA
Cross country	Class AA	Class AA
Football	Class AA	
Golf	Class AAAA	Class AAAA
Soccer	Class AA	Class AA
Track and Field	Class AA	Class AA
Volleyball		Class A
Wrestling	Class AA	
