= Marianne, Pennsylvania =

Unincorporated community in Pennsylvania, US

- Census designated place
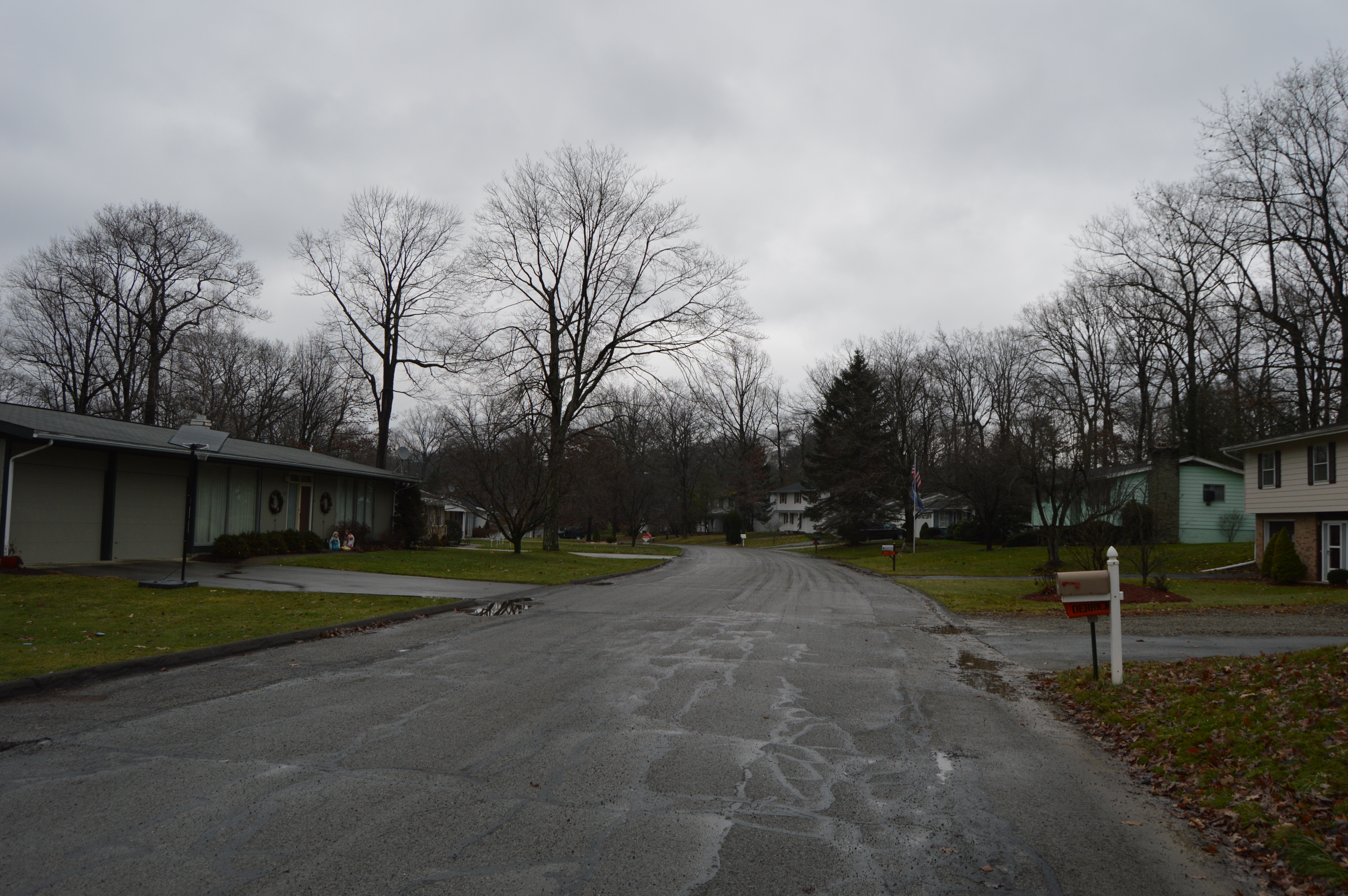
- Houses on Crestmont Drive

- Location in Pennsylvania Marianne (the United States)
- Coordinates: 41°14′39″N 79°25′52″W
- Country: United States
- State: Pennsylvania
- County: Clarion
- Townships: Paint, Elk

Area
  - Total: 1.46 sq mi (3.77 km^{2})
  - Land: 1.45 sq mi (3.75 km^{2})
  - Water: 0.0077 sq mi (0.02 km^{2})
- Elevation: 1,404 ft (428 m)

Population (2020)
  - Total: 1,063
  - Density: 733.4/sq mi (283.16/km^{2})
- Time zone: UTC-5 (Eastern (EST))
  - Summer (DST): UTC-4 (EDT)
- ZIP code: 16254
- Area code: 814
- FIPS code: 42-47404
- GNIS feature ID: 2634245

Marianne is a census-designated place located in Paint Township and Elk Township, Clarion County, in the U.S. state of Pennsylvania. The community is located at the intersections of Pennsylvania Route 66 and U.S. Route 322, approximately 1 mile (1.6 km) east of the borough of Shippenville and 3 miles (5 km) northwest of Clarion, the county seat. As of the 2010 census the population of Marianne was 1,167.

== Demographics ==
Historical population
Census	Pop.	Note	%±
2010	1,167		—
2020	1,063		−8.9%
U.S. Decennial Census
