= Union School District (Pennsylvania) =

School district in Pennsylvania

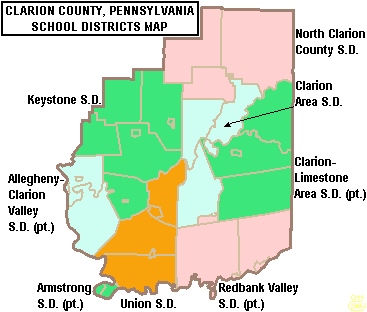

Address
- 354 Baker Street, Suite 2 Rimersburg, Pennsylvania, 16248; United States

District information
- Type: Public

Students and staff
- District mascot: Knights and Damsels
- Colours: Blue and gold

Other information
- Website: www.unionsd.net

The Union School District is a public school district in Clarion County, Pennsylvania. It serves the boroughs of Sligo and Rimersburg, as well as the townships of Madison, Toby, and Piney. Union School District encompasses approximately 80 square miles. According to 2000 federal census data, it serves a resident population of 4,903.

The district operates two schools: Sligo Elementary (K–5) and Union Junior/Sr High (6-12). The district is part of the Riverview Intermediate Unit 6 region. The Riverside Intermediate Unit provides support services and therapy to special education students. It also provides training to school personnel. Occupational training and adult education in various vocational and technical fields are provided by the Clarion County Career Center.
