= Vohwinkel =

Vohwinkel may refer to:

- Vohwinkel, Wuppertal, a former city, now a district of the city of Wuppertal, North Rhine-Westphalia, Germany
  - Wuppertal-Vohwinkel station, a railway station in Vohwinkel
  - Vohwinkel Schwebebahn, a railway station on the Wuppertal Schwebebahn
- Franz Vohwinkel (born 1964), German artist
- TSG Vohwinkel, former German football club merged into Wuppertaler SV
- Vohwinkel syndrome, cutaneous condition

== See also ==
- Vowinckel (disambiguation), German surname
