= Sergeant Carl F. Curran II Bridge =

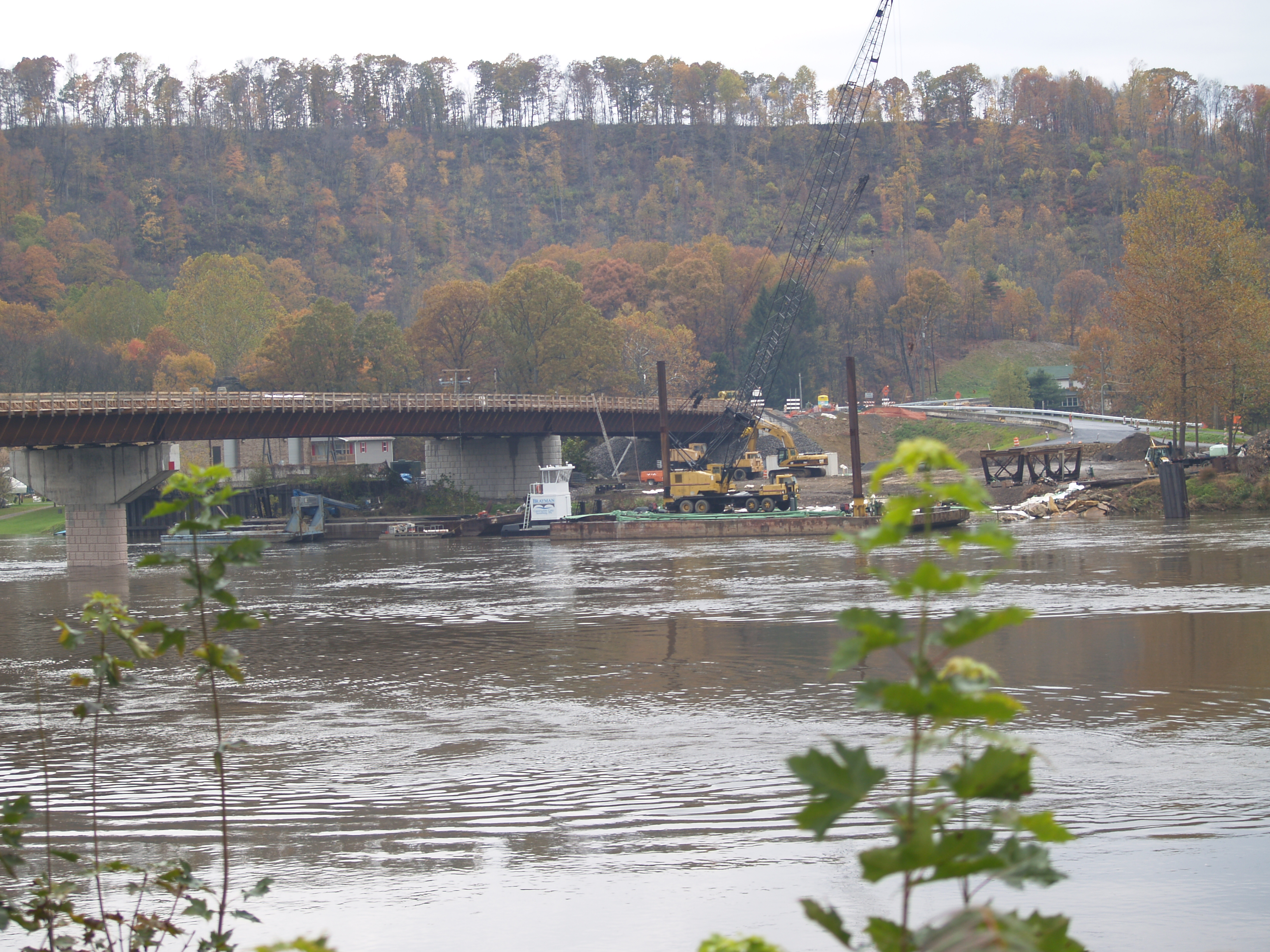
- under construction in 2006
- Coordinates: 40.9901°N 79.6148°W
- Carries: Two lanes of PA 68
- Crosses: Allegheny River
- Locale: East Brady and Brady's Bend Township
- Other name: East Brady Bridge

Characteristics
- Design: Girder bridge
- Total length: 770 feet (230 m)
- Width: 38 feet (12 m)

History
- Opened: 2007

Location
- Interactive map of Sergeant Carl F. Curran II Bridge

The Sergeant Carl F. Curran II Bridge is a girder bridge connecting East Brady and Brady's Bend Township, Pennsylvania. The structure was completed in 2007 to replace a narrow 1885 truss bridge that had been reconstructed twice (in 1953 and 1974). The replacement span was built as part of ongoing improvements to Route 68.

The structure's namesake is a member of the Pennsylvania Army National Guard who was killed in Iraq in 2004. Curran grew up just blocks from the bridge's location.

== History ==
The 2007 bridge replaced a truss bridge built in 1885. The 1885 bridge was demolished at just after 10:00 on June 4, 2007 by Demtech of Dubois, Wyoming. using just under 66 pounds (30 kg) of RDX.

== See also ==
- List of crossings of the Allegheny River
