= Farmington Township, Clarion County, Pennsylvania =

Township in Pennsylvania, US

Coordinates: 41°23′00″N 79°14′29″W

- Township
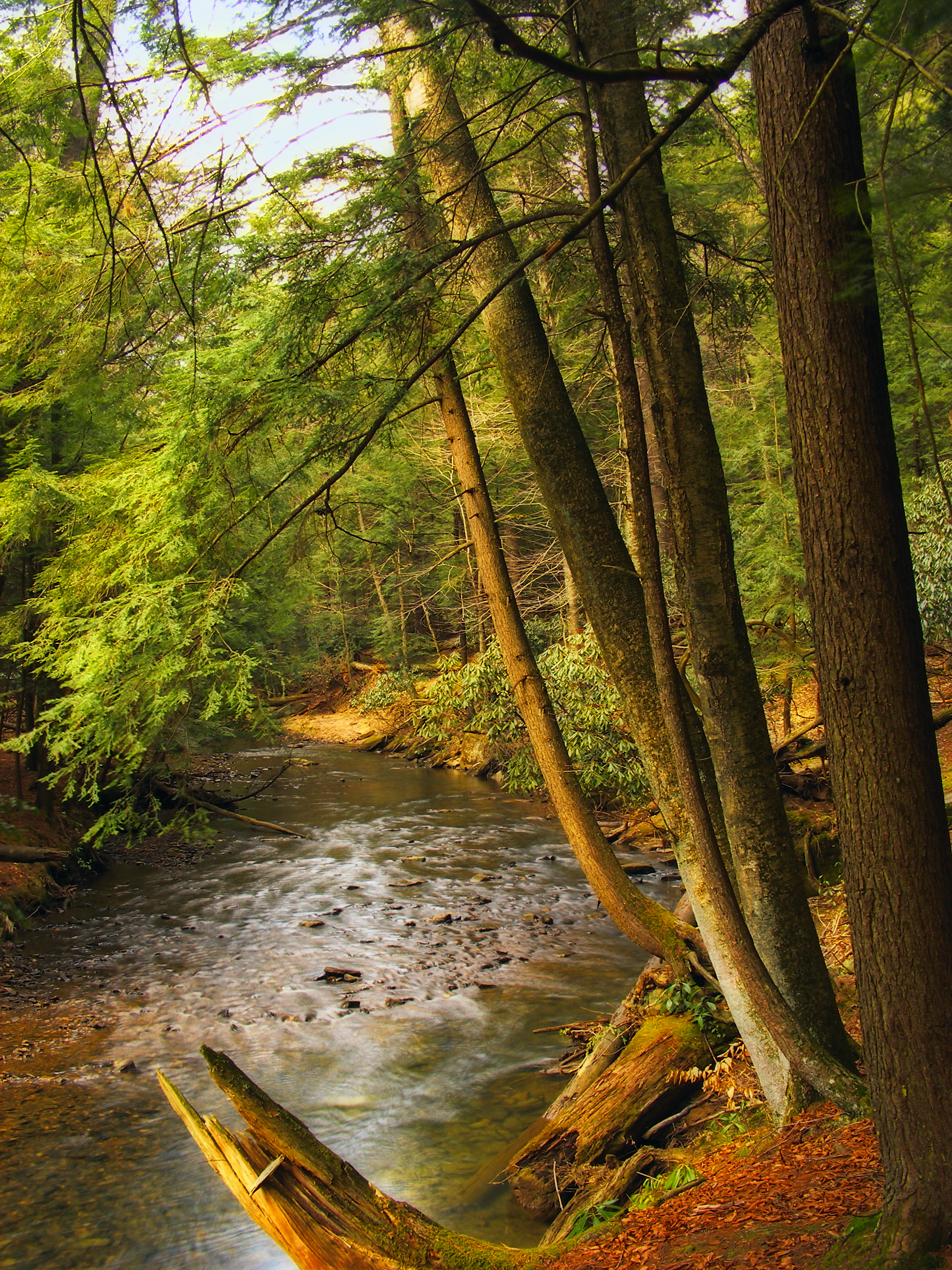
- Cook Forest State Park

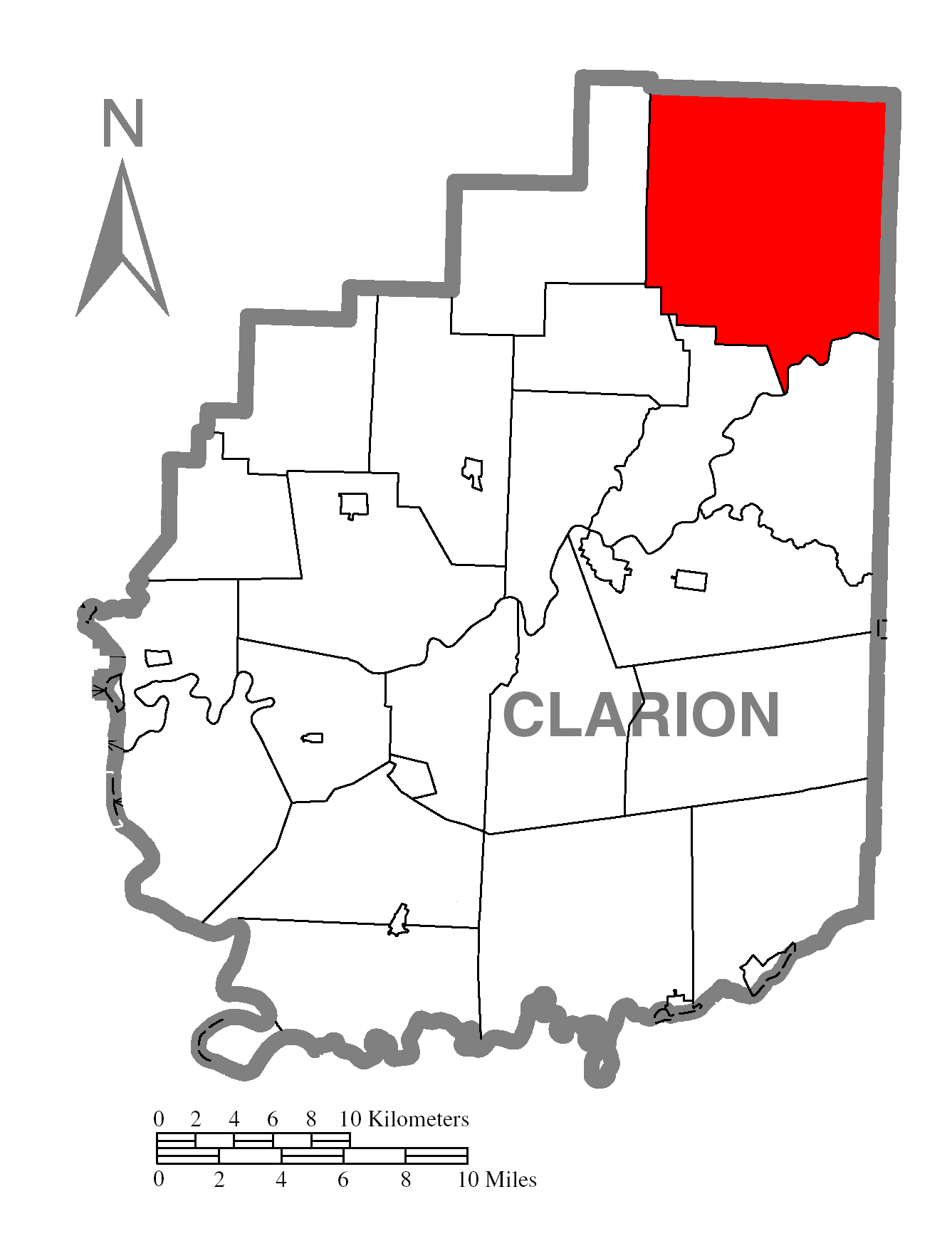
- Map of Clarion County, Pennsylvania highlighting Farmington Township

- Map of Clarion County, Pennsylvania
- Country: United States
- State: Pennsylvania
- County: Clarion
- Incorporated: 1806

Area
  - Total: 62.51 sq mi (161.91 km^{2})
  - Land: 62.29 sq mi (161.32 km^{2})
  - Water: 0.23 sq mi (0.59 km^{2})

Population (2020)
  - Total: 1,779 ▼
  - Estimate (2023): 1,739
  - Density: 28.56/sq mi (11.03/km^{2})
- Time zone: UTC-5 (Eastern (EST))
  - Summer (DST): UTC-4 (EDT)
- FIPS code: 42-031-25272

Farmington Township is a township in Clarion County, Pennsylvania, United States. The population was 1,779 at the 2020 census, a decrease from 1,934 at the 2010 census.

== Geography ==
The township is located in the northeastern corner of Clarion County and is bordered by Forest County to the north and east. A small part of the eastern border of the township touches Jefferson County. The Clarion River forms the southeastern border of the township.

According to the United States Census Bureau, the township has a total area of 62.5 square miles (161.9 km^{2}), of which 62.3 square miles (161.3 km^{2}) is land and 0.2 square miles (0.6 km^{2}), or 0.36%, is water.

The unincorporated communities of Tylersburg, Leeper, Crown, and Vowinckel are in the township. Tylersburg is located along Pennsylvania Route 36, Crown and Vowinckel are on Pennsylvania Route 66, and Leeper is at the intersection of the two highways, west of the center of the township. Cook Forest State Park is in the eastern part of the township in the valley of Toms Run, a tributary of the Clarion River.

== Demographics ==
Historical population
Census	Pop.	Note	%±
2010	1,934		—
2020	1,779		−8.0%
2023 (est.)	1,739		−2.2%
U.S. Decennial Census

As of the census of 2000, there were 1,986 people, 818 households, and 561 families residing in the township. The population density was 31.8 inhabitants per square mile (12.3/km^{2}). There were 1,750 housing units at an average density of 28.0 per square mile (10.8/km^{2}). The racial makeup of the township was 99.40% White, 0.20% African American, 0.15% Native American, 0.10% Asian, and 0.15% from two or more races. Hispanic or Latino of any race were 0.15% of the population.

There were 818 households, out of which 27.5% had children under the age of 18 living with them, 60.0% were married couples living together, 5.4% had a female householder with no husband present, and 31.3% were non-families. 27.8% of all households were made up of individuals, and 11.9% had someone living alone who was 65 years of age or older. The average household size was 2.43 and the average family size was 2.95.

In the township the population was spread out, with 21.9% under the age of 18, 7.3% from 18 to 24, 27.0% from 25 to 44, 29.3% from 45 to 64, and 14.6% who were 65 years of age or older. The median age was 41 years. For every 100 females, there were 102.9 males. For every 100 females age 18 and over, there were 105.2 males.

The median income for a household in the township was $32,739, and the median income for a family was $39,688. Males had a median income of $29,279 versus $20,300 for females. The per capita income for the township was $15,982. About 7.9% of families and 10.3% of the population were below the poverty line, including 17.0% of those under age 18 and 8.7% of those age 65 or over.
