= Gene Host =

American baseball player (1933–1998)

- Pitcher
- Born: January 1, 1933; Leeper, Pennsylvania, U.S.
- Died: August 20, 1998 (aged 65); Nashville, Tennessee, U.S.
- Batted: Both Threw: Left

MLB debut
- September 16, 1956, for the Detroit Tigers

Last MLB appearance
- June 23, 1957, for the Kansas City Athletics

MLB statistics
- Win–loss record: 0–2
- Earned run average: 7.31
- Innings pitched: 28 1/3
- Strikeouts: 14
- Stats at Baseball Reference

Teams
- Detroit Tigers (1956); Kansas City Athletics (1957)

Eugene Earl Host (January 1, 1933 – August 20, 1998) was an American Major League Baseball pitcher and minor league all-star.

== Career ==
Host was signed by the Detroit Tigers as an amateur free agent just before the 1952 season. Host went 26-7 with a 1.81 ERA. He was named to the Coastal Plain League all-star team.

He made it to the major league club for one game in 1956. Following the 1956 season, Host was traded by the Detroit Tigers with Wayne Belardi, Ned Garver, Virgil Trucks, and $20,000 to the Kansas City Athletics for Jim Finigan, Jack Crimian, Bill Harrington, and Eddie Robinson.

Host made eleven appearances for Kansas City in 1957. He ended his big league career with a 0–2 record and a 7.31 ERA. He continued on in the minor leagues through the 1961 campaign.
