= School choice in Pennsylvania =

The policy for school choice is implied in section 1327 of Act No. 14 of the Pennsylvania school code of 1949 which states "to preserve the primary right and obligation of the parent or parents, or person or persons in loco parentis to a child, to choose the education and training for such child."

== Origins in the United States ==
The origins of school choice can be traced to a 1955 proposal by economist and Nobel laureate Milton Friedman who suggested that America's public school system could be improved through free market principles. Friedman proposed giving parents the opportunity to use state and local funds, otherwise designated for local school districts, in the form of vouchers to attend other private or public institutions.

== Forms of school choice in Pennsylvania ==
=== Educational Tax Credit ===
Pennsylvania became the first state to pass an education tax credit targeted at corporations. This legislation came on May 7, 2001 and was passed with overwhelming bi-partisan support. Pennsylvania's Educational Improvement Tax Credit, known as EITC, allows companies a 75 percent tax credit for donations made to non-profit scholarships or educational improvement organizations. If the company makes the same donation over a two-year commitment, the tax credit increases to 90 percent. The tax credits are capped at $750,000 annually or $200,000 for pre-k donations.

==== Opportunity Scholarship Tax Credits ====
The Opportunity Scholarship Tax Credit Program or OSTC provides tax credits to eligible businesses that contribute to an Opportunity Scholarship Organization. These funds are used to provide scholarships to eligible elementary or secondary school students enrolled in “low-achieving” schools. These funds may be used to pay tuition to another public or private school. Low achieving schools are defined as being ranked among the bottom 15 percent based on combined math and reading scores from the Pennsylvania System of School Assessment (PSSA).

=== Charter schools ===
In 1997 during Governor Ridge's administration, the Public School Code of 1949 was amended with Act 22, which established charter schools within the Commonwealth.

=== Cyber charter schools ===
In 2016, 32,958 students were enrolled in cyber charter schools throughout Pennsylvania. That number signifies about 2 per cent of PA's overall public school enrollment. Advocates for cyber charters like the routine contact with instructors and the increased instruction time that online education offers.

As of the 2023-2024 school year, approximately 60,000 students are enrolled full-time in Pennsylvania's 14-15 cyber charter schools. Enrollment surged during the pandemic, making PA a national leader in virtual education, with one major provider, Commonwealth Charter Academy (CCA), exceeding 35,000 students by late 2025.

=== Inter-district choice ===
In Pennsylvania's Chester Upland School District, officials have been forced to look to surrounding Delaware County schools, since there are no other eligible schools within the district. However, such instances are problematic, because outlying schools are not always eager to accept students from low performing school districts. Although open enrollment is not mandated in Pennsylvania, the state's Department of Education encourages school districts to work together on the matter.

== Legislative reform measures ==
In October 2017 Pennsylvania State Senator John DiSanto, a Republican from Dauphin County proposed legislation for Educational Savings Accounts (ESA). This legislation would have allowed families of children attending public schools which are performing in the bottom 15 per cent to state-funded education savings accounts. A vote on this new legislation was postponed by the PA Senate Education Committee in December 2017. It also failed to get out of committee in October with a 6-6 deadlock vote.

== Support ==
Supporters of school choice in Pennsylvania cite the fact that educational choice gives parents greater flexibility to choose the right educational environment for their children regardless of the location of their home school districts. This alternative education comes at lower costs than traditional public schooling. Pennsylvania has been describes as being the “envy of choice advocates across the country” for its pioneer legislation that has given the Commonwealth's families such flexibility.

== Opposition ==
School choice has received vehement opposition since its inception and during its considerable recent growth. Opponents claim that school choice options take money away from public school systems, many of which are located within financially stressed and academically failing areas. Critics, such as PA State Auditor General Eugene DePasquale, have called for an overhaul of legislation to bring greater financial and educational oversight.

== Public school response ==
Faced with tight educational budgets and declining enrollments, some public school systems in the Commonwealth have made innovative curriculum changes to keep pace with school choice options. Keystone School District implemented a greater focus on digital technologies to be competitive. This district not only revised traditional courses, but also instituted on-line courses in advanced placement and dual enrollment classes, in addition to a hybrid curriculum and an aggressive outreach campaign to boost enrollment. The Quakertown Community School District not only implemented an online learning program, but also a performing arts program that includes theater and a dance studio that has drastically reduced its annual tuition reimbursement rates.
