= North Clarion County School District =

School district in Pennsylvania

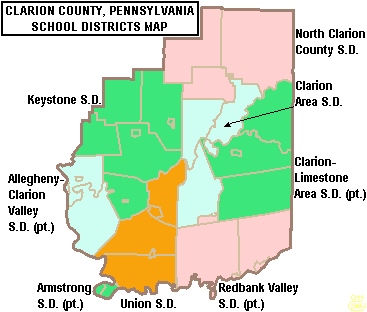

Address
- Northwestern Pennsylvania Tionesta, Pennsylvania, 16353; United States

District information
- Type: Public

Students and staff
- District mascot: Wolves
- Colors: Purple and yellow

Other information
- Website: https://www.northclarion.org/

North Clarion County School District is located in Clarion County, Pennsylvania. It consists of the North Clarion County Elementary School with pre-kindergarten through grade 6 and the North Clarion County Junior/Senior High School serving students in grades 7 through 12.
