= Paint Township, Clarion County, Pennsylvania =

Township in Pennsylvania, US

Coordinates: 41°15′26″N 79°24′24″W

- Township
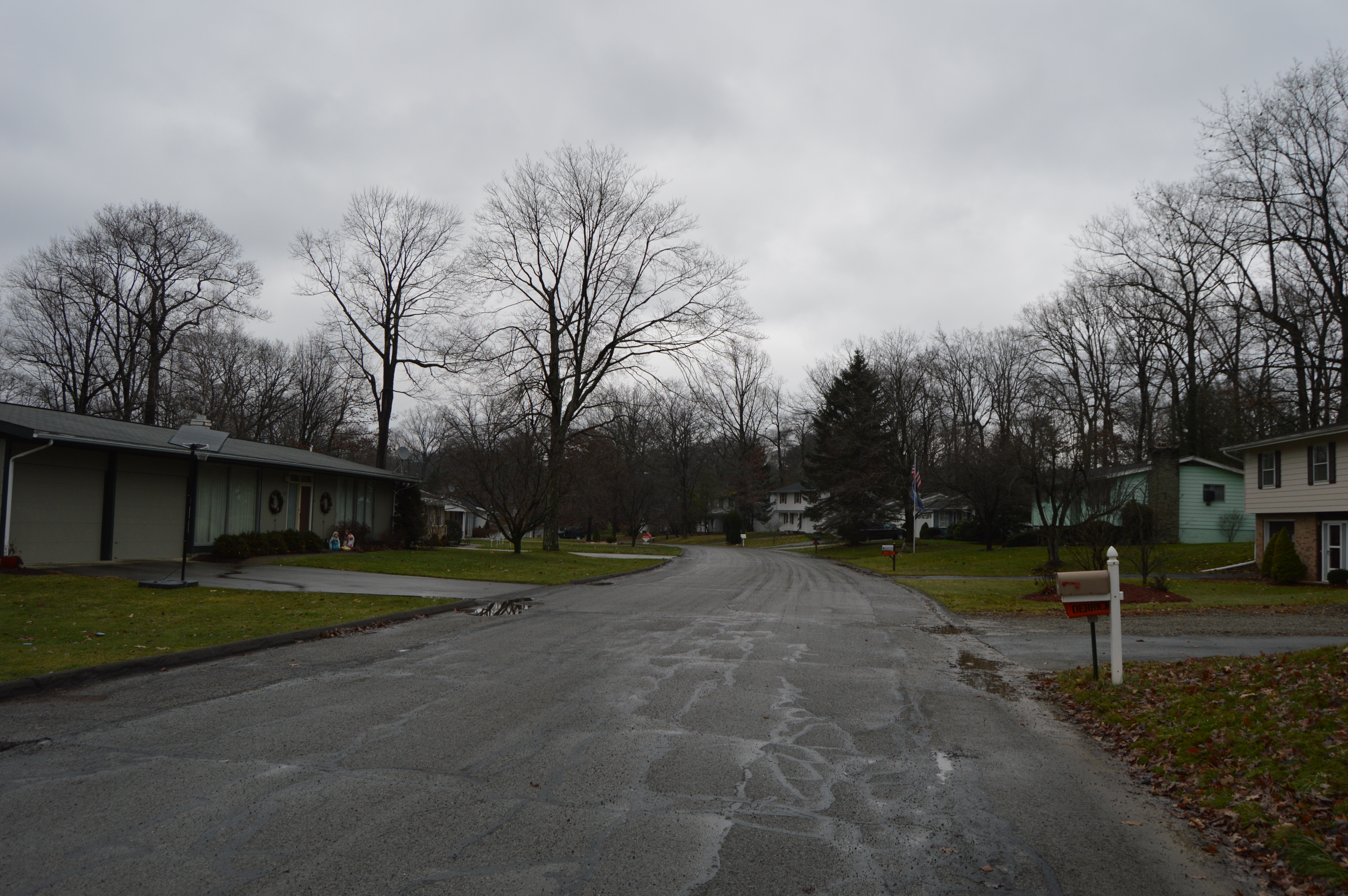
- Houses in a subdivision northwest of Clarion

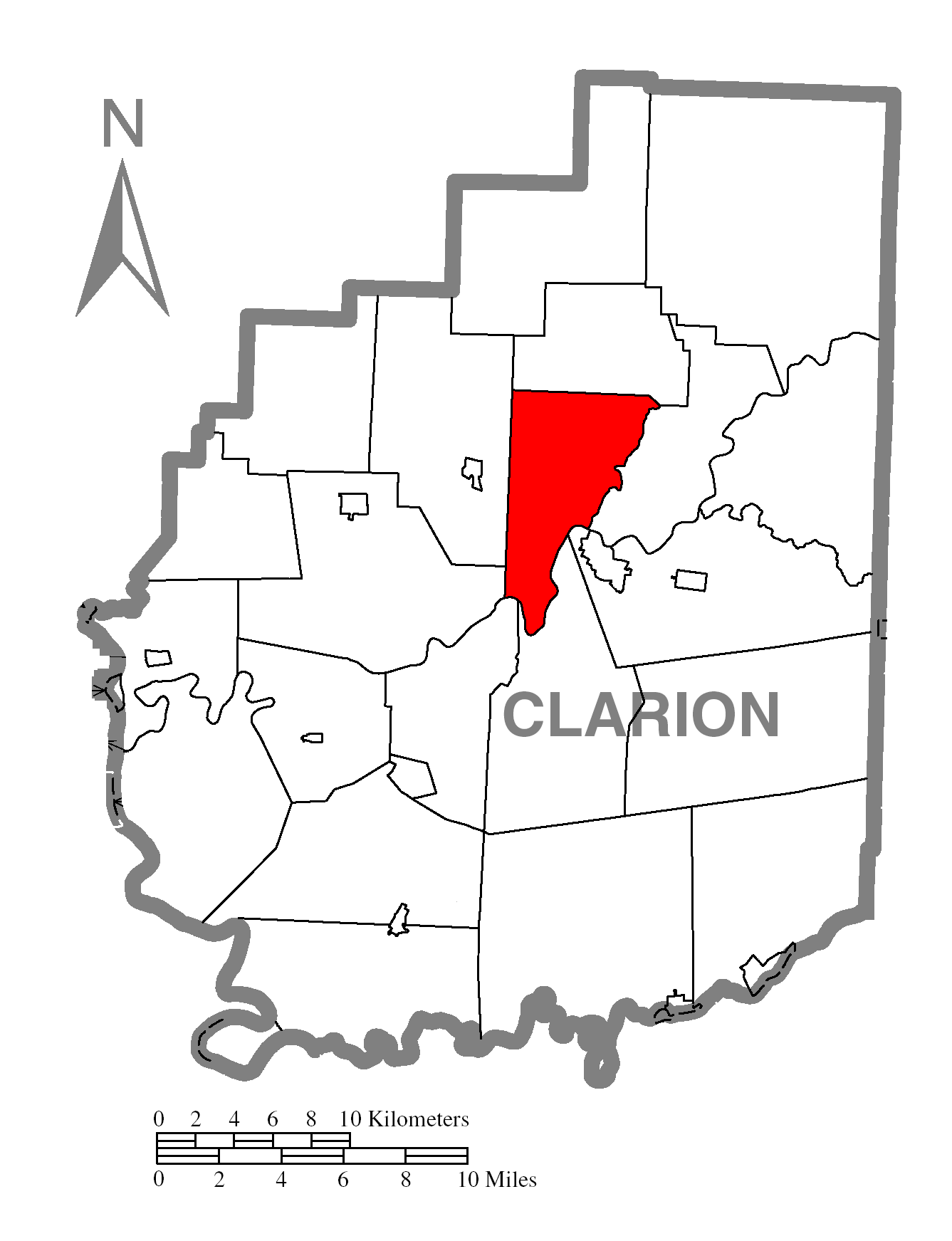
- Map of Clarion County, Pennsylvania highlighting Paint Township

- Map of Clarion County, Pennsylvania
- Country: United States
- State: Pennsylvania
- County: Clarion
- Settled: 1820

Government
  - Type: Board of Supervisors
  - Supervisor: Jeff Corcetti
  - Supervisor: Randy J. Vossburg
  - Supervisor: Rodger Shingledecker

Area
  - Total: 20.68 sq mi (53.57 km^{2})
  - Land: 20.33 sq mi (52.65 km^{2})
  - Water: 0.36 sq mi (0.92 km^{2})

Population (2020)
  - Total: 1,645 ▼
  - Estimate (2022): 1,629
  - Density: 80.92/sq mi (31.24/km^{2})
- Time zone: UTC-5 (Eastern (EST))
  - Summer (DST): UTC-4 (EDT)
- FIPS code: 42-031-57536

Paint Township is a township in Clarion County, Pennsylvania, United States. The population was 1,645 at the 2020 census, a decrease from the figure of 1,699 tabulated in 2010.

== Geography ==
Paint Township is bordered to the southeast by the Clarion River and its tributary, Toby Creek. Its western side contains part of the census-designated place of Marianne, and the borough of Clarion, the county seat, is one mile to the southeast. According to the United States Census Bureau, the township has a total area of 20.7 square miles (53.6 km^{2}), of which 20.3 square miles (52.7 km^{2}) is land and 0.35 square miles (0.9 km^{2}), or 1.71%, is water.

== Demographics ==
Historical population
Census	Pop.	Note	%±
2010	1,699		—
2020	1,645		−3.2%
2022 (est.)	1,629		−1.0%
U.S. Decennial Census

As of the census of 2000, there were 1,778 people, 685 households, and 467 families residing in the township. The population density was 86.8 people per square mile (33.5 people/km^{2}). There were 758 housing units at an average density of 37.0 per square mile (14.3/km^{2}). The racial makeup of the township was 97.75% White, 0.67% African American, 1.29% Asian, and 0.28% from two or more races. Hispanic or Latino of any race were 0.79% of the population.

There were 685 households, out of which 28.2% had children under the age of 18 living with them, 59.3% were married couples living together, 6.6% had a female householder with no husband present, and 31.7% were non-families. 27.3% of all households were made up of individuals, and 11.1% had someone living alone who was 65 years of age or older. The average household size was 2.36 and the average family size was 2.87.

In the township the population was spread out, with 20.9% under the age of 18, 6.6% from 18 to 24, 24.9% from 25 to 44, 26.9% from 45 to 64, and 20.7% who were 65 years of age or older. The median age was 43 years. For every 100 females there were 94.7 males. For every 100 females age 18 and over, there were 95.7 males.

The median income for a household in the township was $39,167, and the median income for a family was $43,750. Males had a median income of $35,250 versus $21,250 for females. The per capita income for the township was $20,936. About 8.3% of families and 8.9% of the population were below the poverty line, including 11.0% of those under age 18 and 6.1% of those age 65 or over.
