= Salem Township, Clarion County, Pennsylvania =

Township in Pennsylvania, US

Coordinates: 41°13′40″N 79°36′35″W

- Township
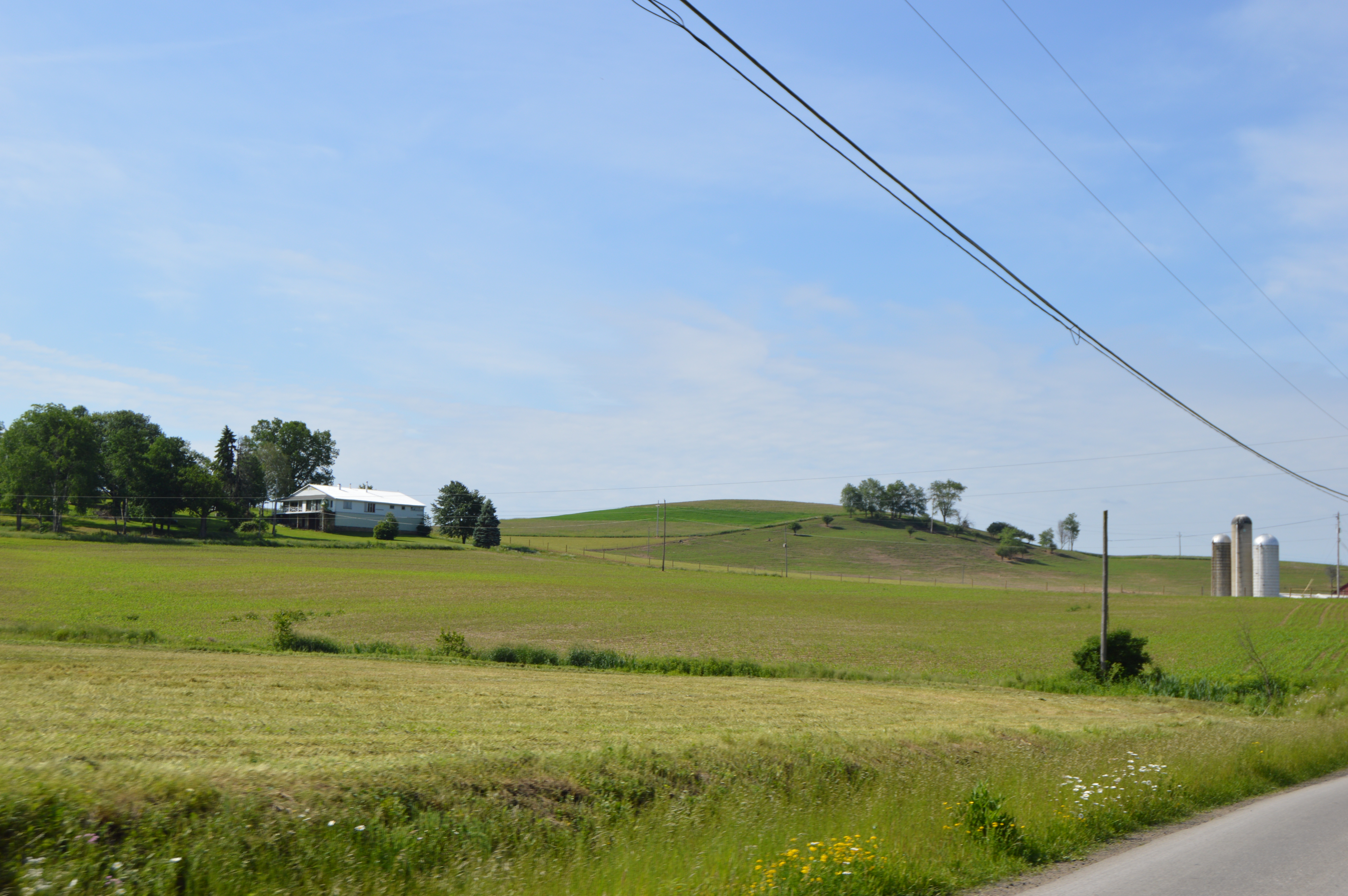
- Countryside along Cropps Corners Road

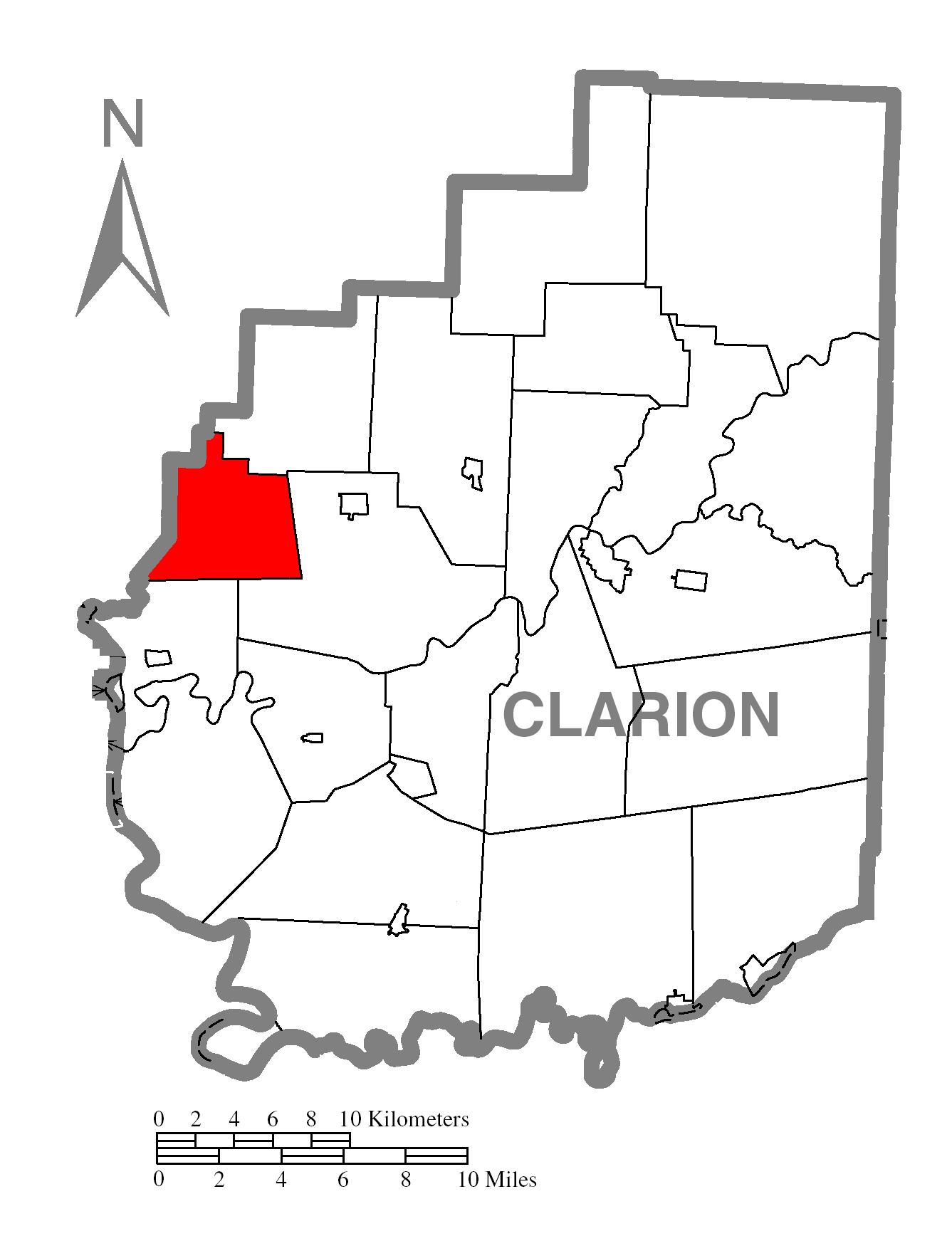
- Map of Clarion County, Pennsylvania highlighting Salem Township

- Map of Clarion County, Pennsylvania
- Country: United States
- State: Pennsylvania
- County: Clarion
- Incorporated: 1856

Area
  - Total: 16.32 sq mi (42.26 km^{2})
  - Land: 16.03 sq mi (41.53 km^{2})
  - Water: 0.28 sq mi (0.73 km^{2})

Population (2020)
  - Total: 901
  - Estimate (2021): 901
  - Density: 53/sq mi (20.3/km^{2})
- Time zone: UTC-5 (Eastern (EST))
  - Summer (DST): UTC-4 (EDT)
- FIPS code: 42-031-67432

Salem Township is a township in Clarion County, Pennsylvania, United States. The population was 901 at the 2020 census, an increase from the figure of 881 tabulated in 2010.

== Geography ==
The township is in western Clarion County and is bordered to the west by Venango County. The unincorporated community of Lamartine is in the western part of the township, along Pennsylvania Route 208, which leads east 5 miles (8 km) to Knox and southwest 5 miles (8 km) to Emlenton on the Allegheny River. The unincorporated community of Pilgrimham, also known as Pilgreham, is located east-northeast of Lamartine along Route 208 past the Nickelville/Cropps Corners intersection and the Pilgrimham Bridge over Turkey Creek (Section 353 of Route 208), centered at Route 208 and Ron McHenry Road. East of the hamlet's center, Route 208 was originally constructed as a higher speed roadway alongside the interior curve of Pilgraheim Drive through the backyards of the residents.

The eastern half of Kahle Lake, a reservoir on Mill Creek, is in the township north of Lamartine. According to the United States Census Bureau, Salem Township has a total area of 16.3 square miles (42.3 km^{2}), of which 16.0 square miles (41.5 km^{2}) is land and 0.27 square miles (0.7 km^{2}), or 1.73%, is water.

== Demographics ==
Historical population
Census	Pop.	Note	%±
2010	881		—
2020	901		2.3%
2021 (est.)	901		0.0%
U.S. Decennial Census

As of the census of 2000, there were 852 people, 311 households, and 250 families residing in the township. The population density was 53.0 inhabitants per square mile (20.5/km^{2}). There were 349 housing units at an average density of 21.7/sq mi (8.4/km^{2}). The racial makeup of the township was 99.06% White, 0.12% Native American, 0.23% Asian, and 0.59% from two or more races. Hispanic or Latino of any race were 0.47% of the population.

There were 311 households, out of which 35.7% had children under the age of 18 living with them, 69.8% were married couples living together, 6.8% had a female householder with no husband present, and 19.6% were non-families. 15.8% of all households were made up of individuals, and 9.0% had someone living alone who was 65 years of age or older. The average household size was 2.74 and the average family size was 3.06.

In the township the population was spread out, with 26.8% under the age of 18, 6.0% from 18 to 24, 30.5% from 25 to 44, 23.5% from 45 to 64, and 13.3% who were 65 years of age or older. The median age was 39 years. For every 100 females there were 100.9 males. For every 100 females age 18 and over, there were 95.0 males.

The median income for a household in the township was $35,385, and the median income for a family was $37,375. Males had a median income of $32,321 versus $23,393 for females. The per capita income for the township was $15,742. About 9.2% of families and 11.3% of the population were below the poverty line, including 18.6% of those under age 18 and 10.4% of those age 65 or over.
