= Vowinckel, Pennsylvania =

Unincorporated community in Pennsylvania, US

- Census designated place
- Location in Pennsylvania Vowinckel (the United States)
- Coordinates: 41°24′39″N 79°13′43″W
- Country: United States
- State: Pennsylvania
- County: Clarion
- Township: Farmington

Area
  - Total: 2.47 sq mi (6.39 km^{2})
  - Land: 2.46 sq mi (6.38 km^{2})
  - Water: 0.0039 sq mi (0.01 km^{2})
- Elevation: 1,637 ft (499 m)

Population (2010)
  - Total: 139
  - Density: 56/sq mi (21.8/km^{2})
- Time zone: UTC-5 (Eastern (EST))
  - Summer (DST): UTC-4 (EDT)
- ZIP code: 16260
- FIPS code: 42-80384
- GNIS feature ID: 2630045

Vowinckel is a census-designated place in Farmington Township, Clarion County, in the U.S. state of Pennsylvania. The community is located along Pennsylvania Route 66 in far northeastern Clarion County. As of the 2010 census the population was 139.
