= Leeper, Pennsylvania =

Unincorporated community in Pennsylvania, US

- Census designated place
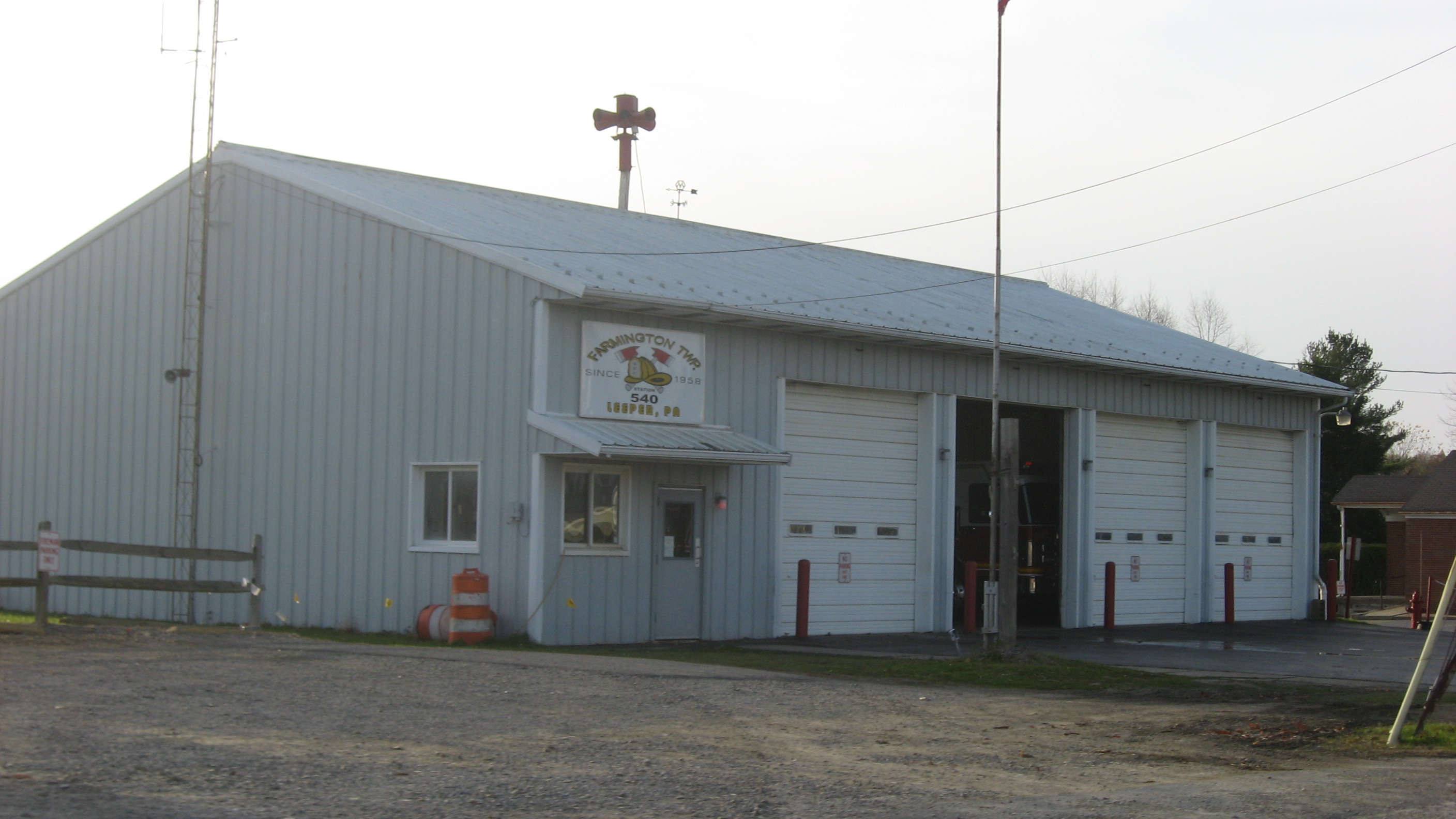
- Farmington Township fire hall in Leeper

- Location in Pennsylvania Leeper (the United States)
- Coordinates: 41°22′14″N 79°18′20″W
- Country: United States
- State: Pennsylvania
- County: Clarion
- Township: Farmington

Area
  - Total: 0.53 sq mi (1.36 km^{2})
  - Land: 0.53 sq mi (1.36 km^{2})
  - Water: 0 sq mi (0.00 km^{2})
- Elevation: 1,634 ft (498 m)

Population (2020)
  - Total: 136
  - Density: 259.6/sq mi (100.23/km^{2})
- Time zone: UTC-5 (Eastern (EST))
  - Summer (DST): UTC-4 (EDT)
- ZIP code: 16233
- FIPS code: 42-42328
- GNIS feature ID: 2630020

Leeper is a census-designated place (CDP) located in Farmington Township, Clarion County, in the U.S. state of Pennsylvania. The community is located at the intersections of Pennsylvania Routes 66 and 36 in northern Clarion County. As of the 2010 census the population was 158.

== Demographics ==
Historical population
Census	Pop.	Note	%±
2020	136		—
U.S. Decennial Census

== Notable person ==
- Gene Host, baseball player.
