= East Brady, Pennsylvania =

Borough in Pennsylvania, US

- Borough
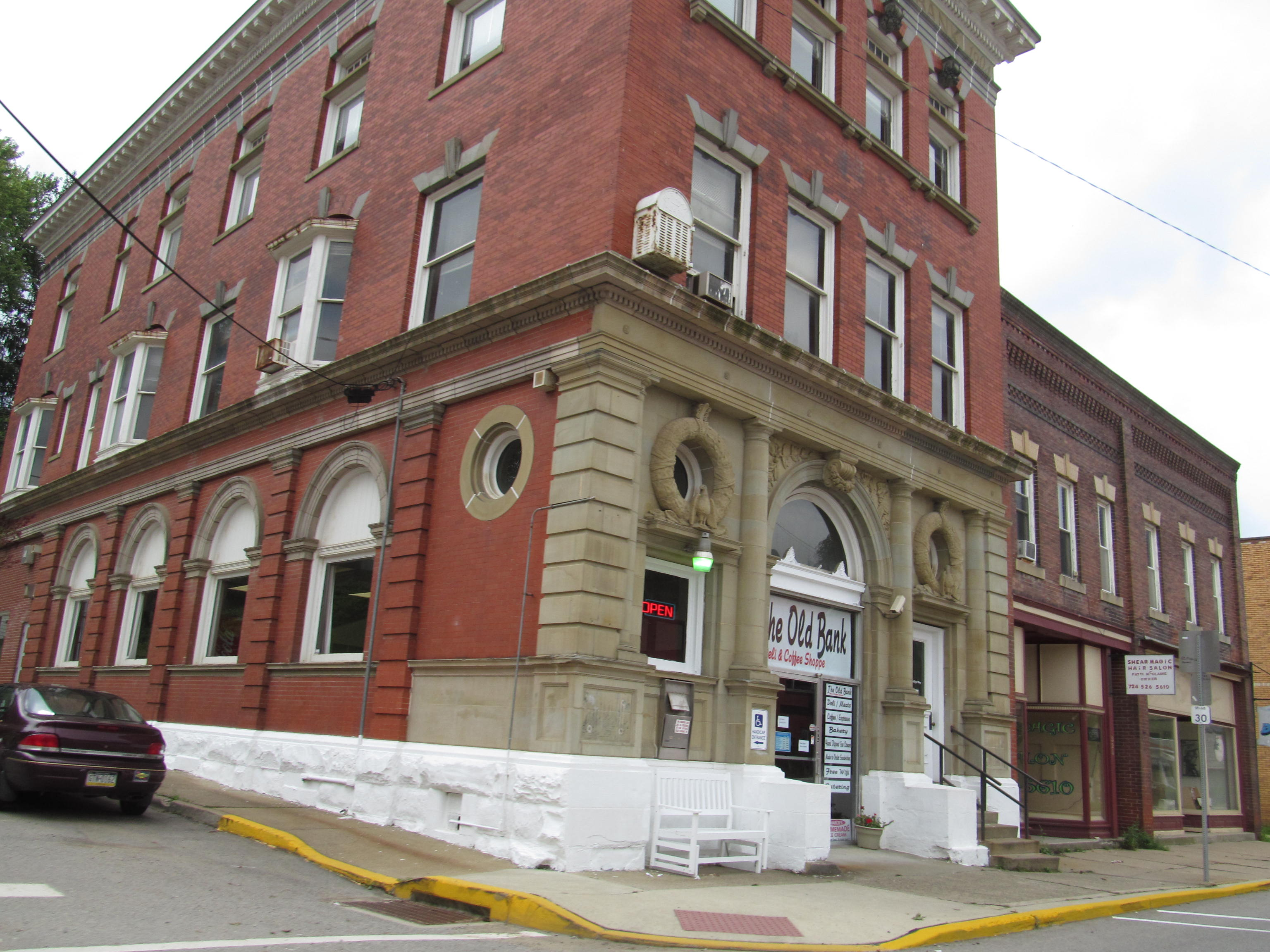
- A street in East Brady

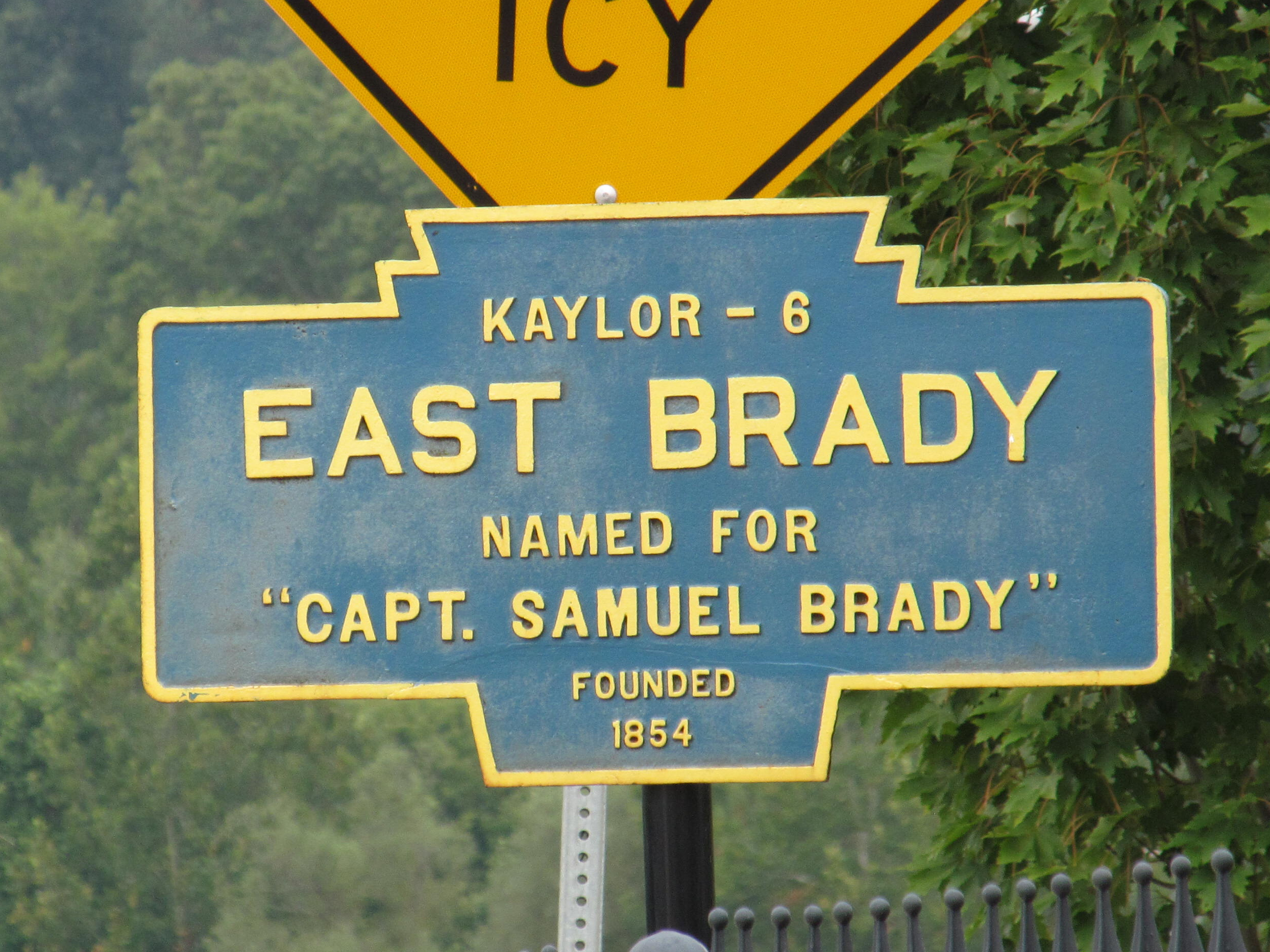
- Keystone Marker

- Location of East Brady in Clarion County, Pennsylvania.

- Map showing Clarion County in Pennsylvania

- Location in Pennsylvania
- Coordinates: 40°59′04″N 79°36′55″W
- Country: United States
- State: Pennsylvania
- County: Clarion
- Settled: 1854
- Platted: 1866
- Incorporated: 1869

Government
  - Type: Borough Council
  - Mayor: William Rode

Area
  - Total: 1.11 sq mi (2.87 km^{2})
  - Land: 0.81 sq mi (2.10 km^{2})
  - Water: 0.30 sq mi (0.77 km^{2})
- Elevation: 960 ft (290 m)

Population (2020)
  - Total: 818
  - Density: 1,011.1/sq mi (390.37/km^{2})
- Time zone: UTC-5 (Eastern (EST))
  - Summer (DST): UTC-4 (EDT)
- ZIP code: 16028
- FIPS code: 42-20840
- Website: https://www.eastbradyborough.com/

East Brady is a borough in Clarion County, Pennsylvania, United States. The population was 822 at the 2020 census.

== History ==
East Brady is named after Captain Samuel Brady, who battled Native Americans at that location.

== Geography ==
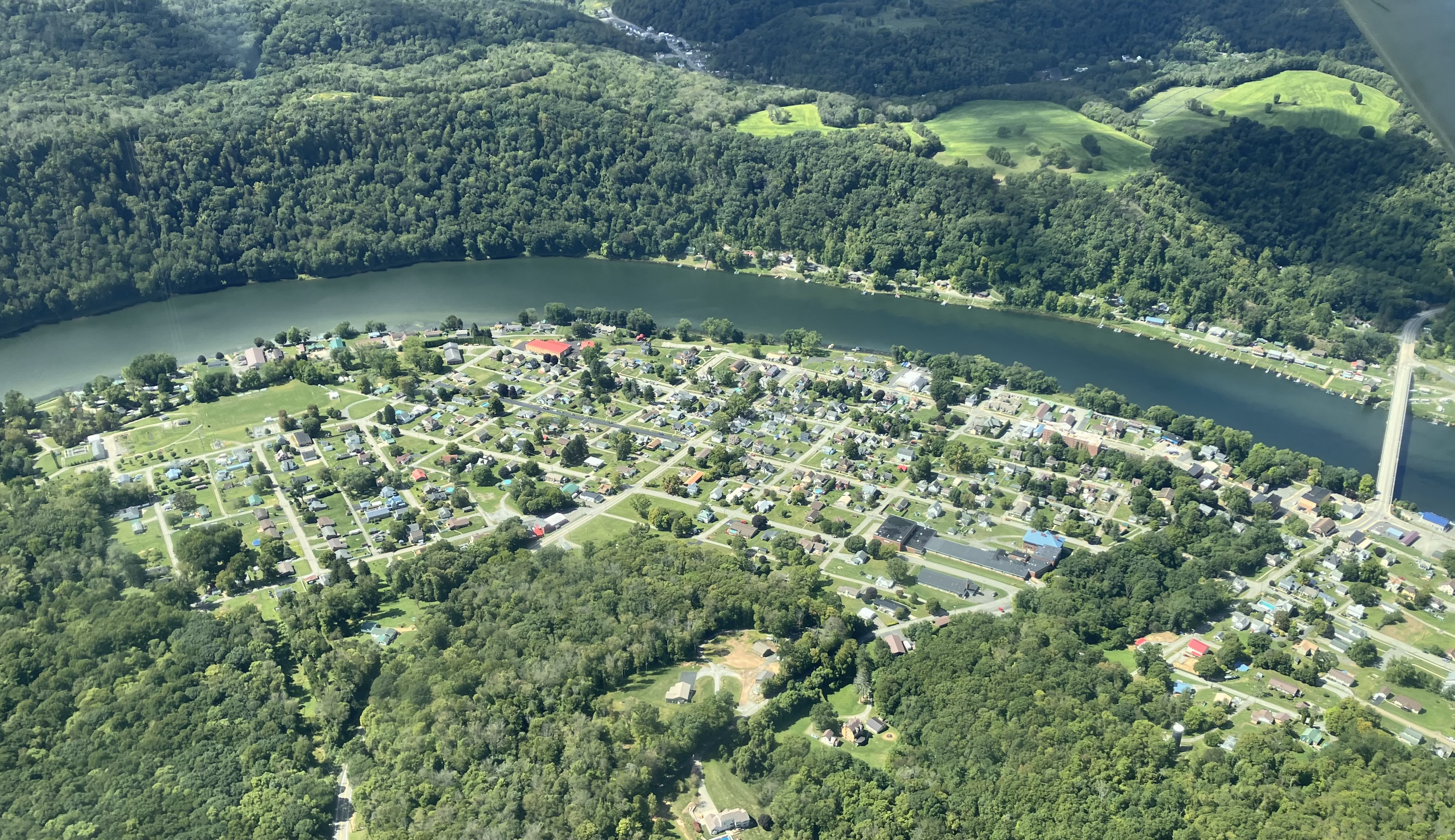
East Brady from the air

East Brady is located in the southwestern corner of Clarion County at 40°59′4″N 79°36′55″W (40.984550, -79.615333), on the east side of a bend in the Allegheny River, at a point 69 miles (111 km) upstream from the river's mouth in Pittsburgh. Pennsylvania Route 68 passes through the borough, crossing the Allegheny on the Sergeant Carl F. Curran II Bridge to Armstrong County and the community of Bradys Bend. PA 68 leads southwest 21 miles (34 km) to Butler and northeast 24 miles (39 km) to Clarion.

According to the United States Census Bureau, East Brady has a total area of 1.1 square miles (2.9 km^{2}), of which 0.81 square miles (2.1 km^{2}) is land and 0.31 square miles (0.8 km^{2}), or 27.00%, is water.

== Demographics ==
Historical population
| Census | Pop. | Note | %± |
|---|---|---|---|
| 1870 | 728 | | — |
| 1880 | 1,242 | | 70.6% |
| 1890 | 1,228 | | −1.1% |
| 1900 | 1,233 | | 0.4% |
| 1910 | 1,493 | | 21.1% |
| 1920 | 1,531 | | 2.5% |
| 1930 | 1,563 | | 2.1% |
| 1940 | 1,427 | | −8.7% |
| 1950 | 1,400 | | −1.9% |
| 1960 | 1,282 | | −8.4% |
| 1970 | 1,218 | | −5.0% |
| 1980 | 1,153 | | −5.3% |
| 1990 | 1,047 | | −9.2% |
| 2000 | 1,038 | | −0.9% |
| 2010 | 942 | | −9.2% |
| 2020 | 818 | | −13.2% |
| 2021 (est.) | 820 | ▲ | 0.2% |

As of the census of 2000, there were 1,038 people, 471 households, and 287 families residing in the borough. The population density was 1,233.6 inhabitants per square mile (476.3/km^{2}). There were 542 housing units at an average density of 644.1 per square mile (248.7/km^{2}). The racial makeup of the borough was 99.42% White, 0.10% Asian, and 0.48% from two or more races. Hispanic or Latino of any race were 0.29% of the population.

There were 471 households, out of which 24.0% had children under the age of 18 living with them, 48.6% were married couples living together, 8.5% had a female householder with no husband present, and 38.9% were non-families. 36.9% of all households were made up of individuals, and 24.6% had someone living alone who was 65 years of age or older. The average household size was 2.18 and the average family size was 2.81.

In the borough the population was spread out, with 19.3% under the age of 18, 7.1% from 18 to 24, 23.2% from 25 to 44, 23.5% from 45 to 64, and 26.9% who were 65 years of age or older. The median age was 45 years. For every 100 females there were 92.6 males. For every 100 females age 18 and over, there were 87.9 males.

The median income for a household in the borough was $26,667, and the median income for a family was $37,589. Males had a median income of $35,417 versus $21,538 for females. The per capita income for the borough was $15,299. About 10.9% of families and 11.8% of the population were below the poverty line, including 8.2% of those under age 18 and 17.7% of those age 65 or over.

== Education ==
East Brady is part of the Karns City Area School District, with K-6 students attending Karns City Area Elementary School.

== Notable person ==
- Jim Kelly, former professional football player and Hall of Famer, Buffalo Bills
- Dean R Fair, Managing Partner at McGill, Power, Bell & Associates, LLP

== See also ==
- Parker, Pennsylvania
