= Clarion County, Pennsylvania =

County in Pennsylvania, United States

- County
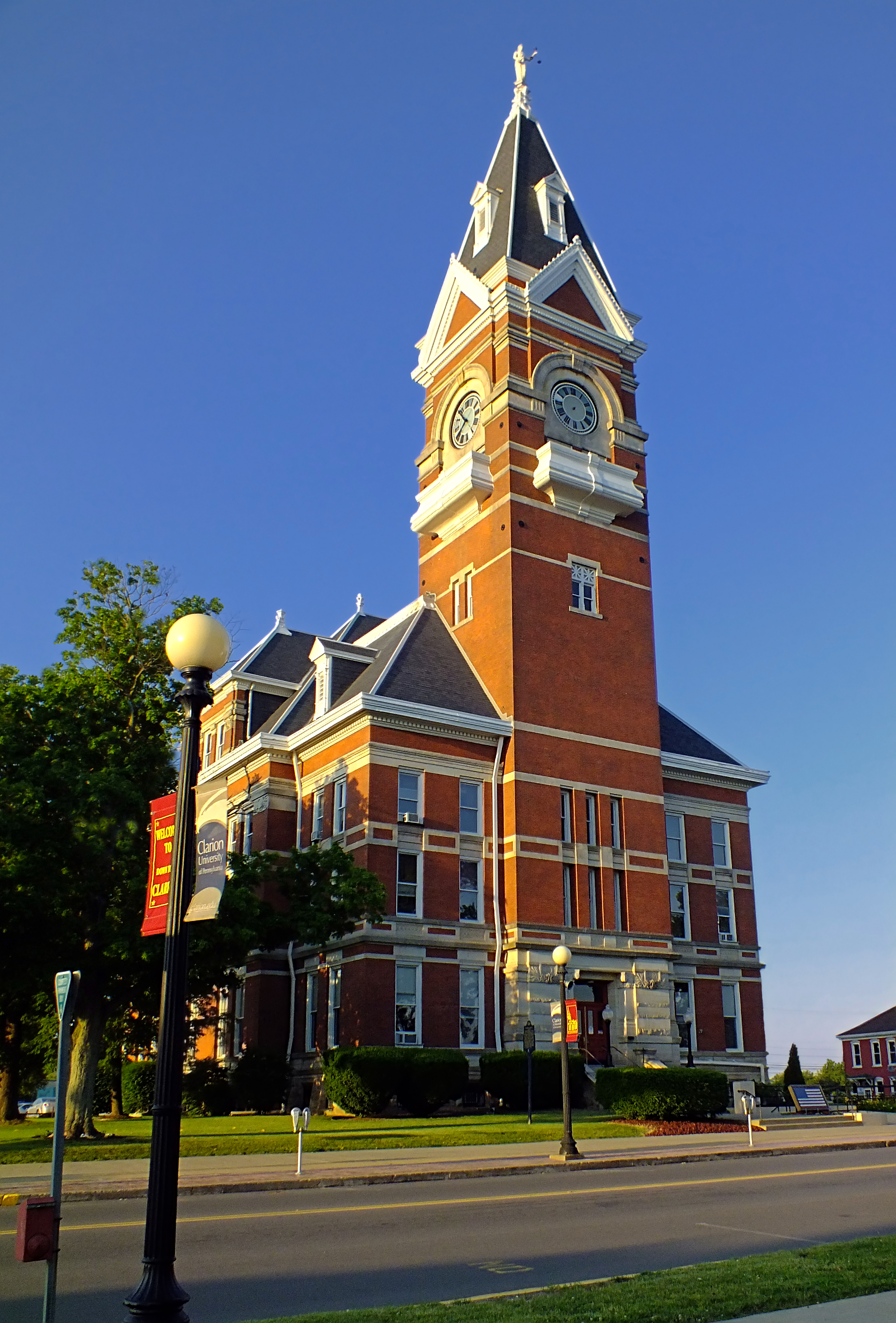
- Clarion County Courthouse

- Flag Seal Logo

- Location within the U.S. state of Pennsylvania
- Coordinates: 41°11′N 79°25′W
- Country: United States
- State: Pennsylvania
- Founded: March 11, 1839
- Named for: Clarion River
- Seat: Clarion
- Largest borough: Clarion

Area
  - Total: 610 sq mi (1,600 km^{2})
  - Land: 601 sq mi (1,560 km^{2})
  - Water: 9.0 sq mi (23 km^{2}) 1.5%

Population (2020)
  - Total: 37,241
  - Estimate (2025): 36,680 ▼
  - Density: 61.3/sq mi (23.7/km^{2})
- Time zone: UTC−5 (Eastern)
  - Summer (DST): UTC−4 (EDT)
- Congressional district: 15th
- Website: www.co.clarion.pa.us

Pennsylvania Historical Marker
- Designated: April 26, 1982

Clarion County is a county in the U.S. state of Pennsylvania. As of the 2020 census, the population was 37,241. Its county seat is Clarion. Clarion County is entirely defined as part of the Pittsburgh media market. The county is part of the Northwestern Pennsylvania region of the commonwealth. (Note: Includes Clearfield, Jefferson, Tioga, McKean, Warren, Clarion, Elk, Potter, Forest and Cameron Counties)

== History ==
The county was formed on March 11, 1839, from parts of Venango and Armstrong counties. The county gets its name from the Clarion River, which flows through the center of the county. The river was a major source of economic growth in the early days of the area. The county relied on the lumber industry in its earliest days, and the Clarion River was used to transport lumber to the Allegheny River. The iron industry dominated the county for a short while, and Clarion County boasted an impressive 31 iron furnaces.

After Edwin Drake struck oil in 1859, many wildcatters flocked to area to drill for oil, particularly along Canoe Creek, Beaver Creek, and the Clarion River. The wildcatting in the county slowed down after the early petroleum industry crashed in 1861 and no major developments would occur until 1869. In 1869, wildcatters struck several decently producing wells across the Allegheny from Parker City. This opened up the Clarion Field, and producers moved to capitalize on these discoveries quickly, putting down wells along the Allegheny River and the Clarion River on the Grass Flats.

== Geography ==
According to the U.S. Census Bureau, the county has a total area of 610 square miles (1,600 km^{2}), of which 601 square miles (1,560 km^{2}) is land and 9.0 square miles (23 km^{2}) (1.5%) is water. It has a warm-summer humid continental climate (Dfb), and average temperatures in Clarion borough range from 24.5 °F in January to 82 °F in July. Clarion County is one of the 423 counties served by the Appalachian Regional Commission, and it is identified as part of the "Midlands" by Colin Woodard in his book American Nations: A History of the Eleven Rival Regional Cultures of North America.

=== Adjacent counties ===
- Forest County (north)
- Jefferson County (east)
- Armstrong County (south)
- Butler County (west)
- Venango County (west)

=== Parks ===
Part of Cook Forest State Park is in Clarion County.

The Clarion County Park is located in Paint Township. Clarion County Veterans Memorial Park is located directly across Main Street (Route 322) from the Clarion County Courthouse in the center of the Borough of Clarion.

=== Major highways ===
- I-80
- US 322
- PA 28
- PA 36
- PA 58
- PA 66
- PA 68
- PA 157
- PA 208
- PA 338
- PA 368
- PA 478
- PA 536
- PA 861

== Demographics ==
Historical population
Census	Pop.	Note	%±
1850	23,565		—
1860	24,988		6.0%
1870	26,537		6.2%
1880	40,328		52.0%
1890	36,802		−8.7%
1900	34,283		−6.8%
1910	36,683		7.0%
1920	36,170		−1.4%
1930	34,531		−4.5%
1940	38,410		11.2%
1950	38,334		−0.2%
1960	37,480		−2.2%
1970	38,414		2.5%
1980	43,362		12.9%
1990	41,699		−3.8%
2000	41,765		0.2%
2010	39,988		−4.3%
2020	37,241		−6.9%
2025 (est.)	36,680	▼	−1.5%
U.S. Decennial Census; 1790-1960 1900-1990; 1990-2000 2010-2020

=== 2020 census ===
As of the 2020 census, the county had a population of 37,241, a population density of 69 people per square mile (27 people/km^{2}), 15,298 households, and 10,738 families residing in the county. The median age was 43.6 years, 19.5% of residents were under the age of 18, 21.6% were 65 years of age or older, there were 95.6 males for every 100 females, and there were 93.1 males for every 100 females age 18 and over.

Of the 15,298 households in the county, 24.6% had children under the age of 18 living in them, 49.5% were married-couple households, 18.6% were households with a male householder and no spouse or partner present, and 24.6% were households with a female householder and no spouse or partner present; about 30.6% of all households were made up of individuals and 15.0% had someone living alone who was 65 years of age or older.

There were 18,829 housing units, of which 18.8% were vacant, 71.5% of the occupied units were owner-occupied, and 28.5% were renter-occupied; the homeowner vacancy rate was 1.5% and the rental vacancy rate was 11.5%.

15.2% of residents lived in urban areas, while 84.8% lived in rural areas.

The racial makeup of the county was 94.4% White, 1.5% Black or African American, 0.1% American Indian and Alaska Native, 0.5% Asian, <0.1% Native Hawaiian and Pacific Islander, 0.5% from some other race, and 3.0% from two or more races; Hispanic or Latino residents of any race comprised 1.0% of the population.

Clarion County, Pennsylvania – Racial and ethnic composition Note: the US Census treats Hispanic/Latino as an ethnic category. This table excludes Latinos from the racial categories and assigns them to a separate category. Hispanics/Latinos may be of any race.
Race / Ethnicity (NH = Non-Hispanic)	Pop 2000	Pop 2010	Pop 2020	% 2000	% 2010	% 2020
White alone (NH)	40,867	38,724	35,023	97.84%	96.83%	94.04%
Black or African American alone (NH)	325	468	521	0.77%	1.17%	1.39%
Native American or Alaska Native alone (NH)	44	45	39	0.10%	0.11%	0.10%
Asian alone (NH)	141	191	175	0.33%	0.47%	0.46%
Pacific Islander alone (NH)	2	5	15	0.00%	0.01%	0.04%
Other race alone (NH)	9	24	111	0.02%	0.06%	0.29%
Mixed race or Multiracial (NH)	205	286	970	0.49%	0.71%	2.60%
Hispanic or Latino (any race)	172	245	387	0.41%	0.61%	1.03%
Total	41,765	39,988	37,241	100.00%	100.00%	100.00%

== Government ==
United States presidential election results for Clarion County, Pennsylvania
Year	Republican		Democratic		Third party(ies)	
Year	No.	%	No.	%	No.	%
1888	2,950	41.71%	3,880	54.86%	243	3.44%
1892	2,543	39.23%	3,746	57.79%	193	2.98%
1896	3,338	43.57%	4,097	53.47%	227	2.96%
1900	3,002	44.69%	3,472	51.68%	244	3.63%
1904	2,978	50.95%	2,466	42.19%	401	6.86%
1908	2,915	42.92%	3,291	48.46%	585	8.61%
1912	916	14.63%	3,079	49.17%	2,267	36.20%
1916	2,595	41.07%	3,269	51.74%	454	7.19%
1920	4,615	53.28%	3,487	40.26%	560	6.47%
1924	5,913	55.27%	3,642	34.04%	1,143	10.68%
1928	9,183	70.43%	3,746	28.73%	109	0.84%
1932	5,991	46.03%	6,651	51.10%	373	2.87%
1936	8,477	49.32%	8,412	48.94%	300	1.75%
1940	9,035	57.76%	6,564	41.96%	44	0.28%
1944	8,098	60.16%	5,263	39.10%	99	0.74%
1948	6,866	57.94%	4,984	42.06%	0	0.00%
1952	9,340	63.76%	5,212	35.58%	97	0.66%
1956	10,048	66.94%	4,955	33.01%	8	0.05%
1960	10,307	65.04%	5,506	34.74%	34	0.21%
1964	6,143	39.92%	9,235	60.01%	11	0.07%
1968	8,077	56.00%	5,341	37.03%	1,005	6.97%
1972	10,073	67.96%	4,509	30.42%	239	1.61%
1976	8,360	54.96%	6,585	43.29%	265	1.74%
1980	8,812	58.35%	5,472	36.24%	817	5.41%
1984	9,836	64.27%	5,407	35.33%	61	0.40%
1988	8,026	58.37%	5,616	40.84%	109	0.79%
1992	6,477	41.21%	5,584	35.53%	3,657	23.27%
1996	6,916	45.89%	5,954	39.51%	2,201	14.60%
2000	9,796	61.81%	5,605	35.37%	448	2.83%
2004	11,063	64.38%	6,049	35.20%	72	0.42%
2008	10,737	60.06%	6,756	37.79%	384	2.15%
2012	10,828	66.55%	5,056	31.08%	386	2.37%
2016	12,576	71.21%	4,273	24.20%	811	4.59%
2020	14,578	74.67%	4,678	23.96%	268	1.37%
2024	15,036	76.00%	4,562	23.06%	185	0.94%

United States Senate election results for Clarion County, Pennsylvania1
Year	Republican		Democratic		Third party(ies)	
Year	No.	%	No.	%	No.	%
1994	7,458	59.40%	4,416	35.17%	681	5.42%
2000	9,823	62.50%	5,482	34.88%	413	2.63%
2006	6,801	52.79%	6,081	47.21%	0	0.00%
2012	10,451	64.75%	5,105	31.63%	585	3.62%
2018	8,838	62.99%	4,924	35.09%	269	1.92%
2024	14,179	72.06%	4,683	23.80%	815	4.14%

United States Senate election results for Clarion County, Pennsylvania3
Year	Republican		Democratic		Third party(ies)	
Year	No.	%	No.	%	No.	%
1992	7,895	50.66%	6,431	41.27%	1,257	8.07%
1998	6,983	67.66%	2,666	25.83%	671	6.50%
2004	9,524	58.51%	4,703	28.89%	2,051	12.60%
2010	8,266	67.40%	3,999	32.60%	0	0.00%
2016	11,310	64.83%	4,931	28.27%	1,204	6.90%
2022	10,620	69.09%	4,327	28.15%	424	2.76%

Pennsylvania Gubernatorial election results for Clarion County
Year	Republican		Democratic		Third party(ies)	
Year	No.	%	No.	%	No.	%
1970	5,579	47.10%	6,006	50.71%	259	2.19%
1974	6,792	55.54%	5,303	43.36%	134	1.10%
1978	5,677	45.21%	6,833	54.42%	46	0.37%
1982	6,515	51.20%	6,119	48.09%	90	0.71%
1986	6,464	51.16%	6,022	47.66%	149	1.18%
1990	3,811	34.50%	7,235	65.50%	0	0.00%
1994	6,724	53.05%	4,029	31.79%	1,921	15.16%
1998	5,861	57.21%	2,112	20.62%	2,271	22.17%
2002	7,397	64.08%	3,934	34.08%	212	1.84%
2006	7,505	57.93%	5,451	42.07%	0	0.00%
2010	8,827	71.23%	3,566	28.77%	0	0.00%
2014	6,418	59.49%	4,371	40.51%	0	0.00%
2018	8,594	60.98%	5,191	36.83%	309	2.19%
2022	10,019	65.03%	5,114	33.19%	274	1.78%

=== Voter registration ===
As of February 6, 2024, there are 23,414 registered voters in Clarion County.

Chart of Voter Registration
1. Republican (63.9%)
2. Democratic (24.7%)
3. Independent (8.31%)
4. Other Parties (3.08%)
- Republican: 14,959 (63.89%)
- Democratic: 5,788 (24.72%)
- Independent: 1,946 (8.31%)
- Third Party: 721 (3.08%)

=== County commissioners ===
- Wayne Brosius; Republican
- Ted Tharan; Republican
- Braxton White; Democrat

=== Other county officials ===
- Hon. James G. Arner, senior judge, Pennsylvania Courts of Common Pleas
- Hon. Sara Seidle-Patton, president judge, Pennsylvania Courts of Common Pleas
- Duane L. Quinn (18-3-01), district judge
- Timothy P. Schill (18-3-02), district judge
- Jarah L Heeter (18-3-03), district judge
- Jeffery C. Miller (18-3-04), district judge
- Drew Welsh; Republican, District Attorney
- Shawn Zerfoss; Republican, Sheriff
- Karyn Montana; Republican, Treasurer

=== State senate ===
District	Senator	Party
21	Scott E. Hutchinson	Republican

=== State House of Representatives ===
District	Representative	Party
63	Josh Bashline	Republican

=== United States House of Representatives ===
District	Representative	Party
15	Glenn Thompson	Republican

=== United States Senate ===
Senator	Party
John Fetterman	Democrat
Dave McCormick	Republican

== Education ==
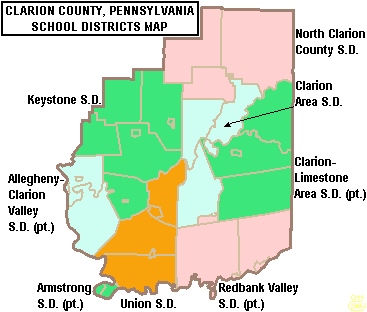
Map of Clarion County public school districts

=== Colleges and universities ===
- PennWest Clarion

=== Public school districts ===
- Allegheny-Clarion Valley School District
- Clarion Area School District
- Clarion-Limestone Area School District
- Karns City Area School District
- Keystone School District
- North Clarion County School District
- Redbank Valley School District
- Union School District

=== Intermediate unit ===
Public school districts and private schools in the county are served by Riverview Intermediate Unit IU6 which provides special education and professional development services.

=== Technical school ===
Clarion County Career Center is located along State Route 66 in Marianne (Shippenville address).

=== Private schools ===
- Alexander Amish School - Venus
- Bear Run School - Knox
- Christs Dominion Academy - Summerville
- Clarion Center School - Clarion
- County Corner - Knox
- Deer View School - Mayport
- Immaculate Conception School - Clarion
- Little Bird Preschool - New Bethlehem
- Meadow View Amish School - Knox
- New Bethlehem Mennonite School - New Bethlehem
- Shady Nook Amish School - Sligo
- St Josephs School - Lucinda
- Zacheral Amish School - Venus

== Communities ==
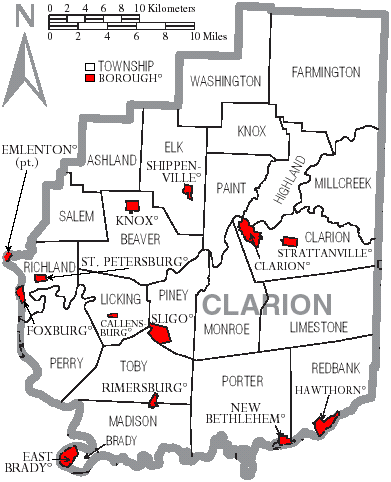
Map of Clarion County, Pennsylvania with Municipal Labels showing Boroughs (red) and Townships (white)

Under Pennsylvania law, there are four types of incorporated municipalities: cities, boroughs, townships, and, in at most two cases, towns. The following boroughs and townships are located in Clarion County:

=== Boroughs ===
- Callensburg
- Clarion (county seat)
- East Brady
- Foxburg
- Hawthorn
- Knox
- New Bethlehem
- Rimersburg
- Shippenville
- Sligo
- St. Petersburg
- Strattanville

=== Townships ===
- Ashland
- Beaver
- Brady
- Clarion
- Elk
- Farmington
- Highland
- Knox
- Licking
- Limestone
- Madison
- Millcreek
- Monroe
- Paint
- Perry
- Piney
- Porter
- Redbank
- Richland
- Salem
- Toby
- Washington

=== Census-designated places ===
- Crown
- Leeper
- Marianne
- Tylersburg
- Vowinckel

=== Population ranking ===
The population ranking of the following table is based on the 2020 census of Clarion County.

† county seat

Rank	City/town/etc.	Municipal type	Population (2020 Census)
1	† Clarion	Borough	3,931
2	Marianne	CDP	1,063
3	Knox	Borough	1,093
4	New Bethlehem	Borough	978
5	Rimersburg	Borough	942
6	East Brady	Borough	818
7	Sligo	Borough	681
8	Strattanville	Borough	537
9	Hawthorn	Borough	477
10	Shippenville	Borough	442
11	St. Petersburg	Borough	336
12	Callensburg	Borough	150
13	Tylersburg	CDP	196
T-14	Foxburg	Borough	181
T-14	Crown	CDP	265
15	Leeper	CDP	136
16	Vowinckel	CDP	130

== Notable people ==
- Marietta Bones (1842–1901) - suffragist, social reformer, philanthropist
- Fred Caligiuri (1918–2018) - Major League Baseball pitcher (Philadelphia Athletics, 1941, 1942); as of 2018 was the oldest living major-league player; born in Forest County; former resident of Knox and Rimersburg
- Hunter Corbett - pioneer American Presbyterian missionary to China, ministered in China for 56 years
- Jim Kelly - NFL athlete (Buffalo Bills); grew up in East Brady
- Chris Kirkpatrick - musician ('N Sync); born in Clarion
- Dominick Labino - glass artist; born in Fairmount City (Redbank Township); managed the Owens-Illinois glass plant in Clarion
- Ossee Schreckengost - Major League Baseball player; born in New Bethlehem
- Randall Silvis - author and screenwriter; born in Madison Township
- Grace M. Sloan (1902–2001), Pennsylvania state treasurer and auditor general; born in Clarion
- Ernest M. Skinner - pipe organ builder, inventor; born in Clarion
- Jane Wolfe - silent film actress and thelemite; born in St. Petersburg

== See also ==
- National Register of Historic Places listings in Clarion County, Pennsylvania
- Oil Creek Library District
