= Rimersburg, Pennsylvania =

Borough in Pennsylvania, US

- Borough
- Location of Rimersburg in Clarion County, Pennsylvania.

- Map showing Clarion County in Pennsylvania

- Location within Pennsylvania
- Coordinates: 41°02′30″N 79°30′09″W
- Country: United States
- State: Pennsylvania
- County: Clarion
- Settled: 1829
- Incorporated: 1853

Government
  - Type: Borough Council
  - Mayor: Timothy Yeany

Area
  - Total: 0.36 sq mi (0.94 km^{2})
  - Land: 0.36 sq mi (0.94 km^{2})
  - Water: 0 sq mi (0.00 km^{2})
- Elevation: 1,480 ft (450 m)

Population (2020)
  - Total: 942
  - Density: 2,590.0/sq mi (1,000.02/km^{2})
- Time zone: UTC-5 (Eastern (EST))
  - Summer (DST): UTC-4 (EDT)
- ZIP code: 16248
- Area code: 814
- FIPS code: 42-64904
- Website: www.rimersburgborough.com

Rimersburg (/ˈraɪmɛrzbərɡ/ RYE-merz-berg) is a borough in Clarion County, Pennsylvania, United States. The population was 945 at the 2020 census.

== Geography ==
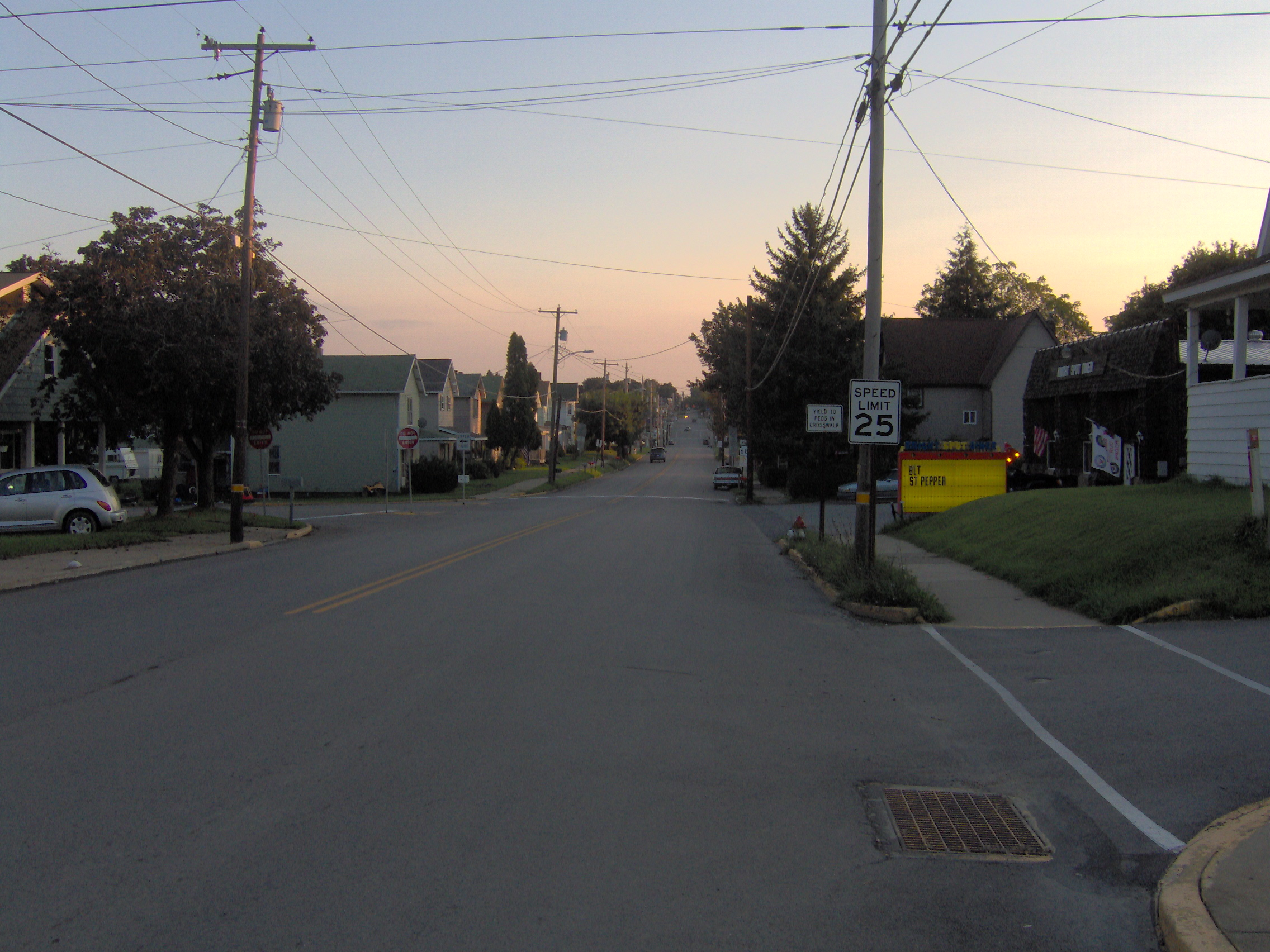
View of Rimersburg from the north end of the borough

Rimersburg is located in southwestern Clarion County at 41°02′30″N 79°30′09″W. Pennsylvania Route 68 passes through the center of the borough, leading northeast 5 miles (8 km) to Sligo and 16 miles (26 km) to Clarion, the county seat, and southwest 8 miles (13 km) to East Brady on the Allegheny River. Pennsylvania Route 861 leads east from Rimersburg 12 miles (19 km) to New Bethlehem.

According to the United States Census Bureau, Rimersburg has a total area of 0.36 square miles (0.94 km^{2}), all land.

== Demographics ==
Historical population
Census	Pop.	Note	%±
1860	346		—
1870	324		−6.4%
1880	334		3.1%
1890	360		7.8%
1900	487		35.3%
1910	855		75.6%
1920	1,060		24.0%
1930	1,319		24.4%
1940	1,393		5.6%
1950	1,398		0.4%
1960	1,323		−5.4%
1970	1,146		−13.4%
1980	1,096		−4.4%
1990	1,053		−3.9%
2000	1,051		−0.2%
2010	951		−9.5%
2020	942		−0.9%
2021 (est.)	943	▲	0.1%

As of the 2000 census, there were 1,051 people, 447 households, and 292 families residing in the borough. The population density was 2,961.0 people per square mile (1,143.2 people/km^{2}). There were 472 housing units at an average density of 1,329.8 per square mile (513.4/km^{2}). The racial makeup of the borough was 99.43% White, 0.10% African American, 0.19% Native American, and 0.29% from two or more races. Hispanic or Latino of any race were 0.10% of the population.

There were 447 households, out of which 30.6% had children under the age of 18 living with them, 45.4% were married couples living together, 15.0% had a female householder with no husband present, and 34.5% were non-families. 32.4% of all households were made up of individuals, and 18.8% had someone living alone who was 65 years of age or older. The average household size was 2.35 and the average family size was 2.95.

In the borough, the population was spread out, with 24.4% under the age of 18, 9.4% from 18 to 24, 26.1% from 25 to 44, 21.4% from 45 to 64, and 18.7% who were 65 years of age or older. The median age was 37 years. For every 100 females, there were 82.8 males. For every 100 females age 18 and over, there were 77.5 males.

The median income for a household in the borough was $23,155, and the median income for a family was $31,417. Males had a median income of $27,500 versus $17,083 for females. The per capita income for the borough was $12,549. About 15.9% of families and 18.4% of the population were below the poverty line, including 25.3% of those under age 18 and 15.3% of those age 65 or over.
