= Elk Township, Clarion County, Pennsylvania =

Township in Pennsylvania, US

Coordinates: 41°16′23″N 79°28′07″W

- Township
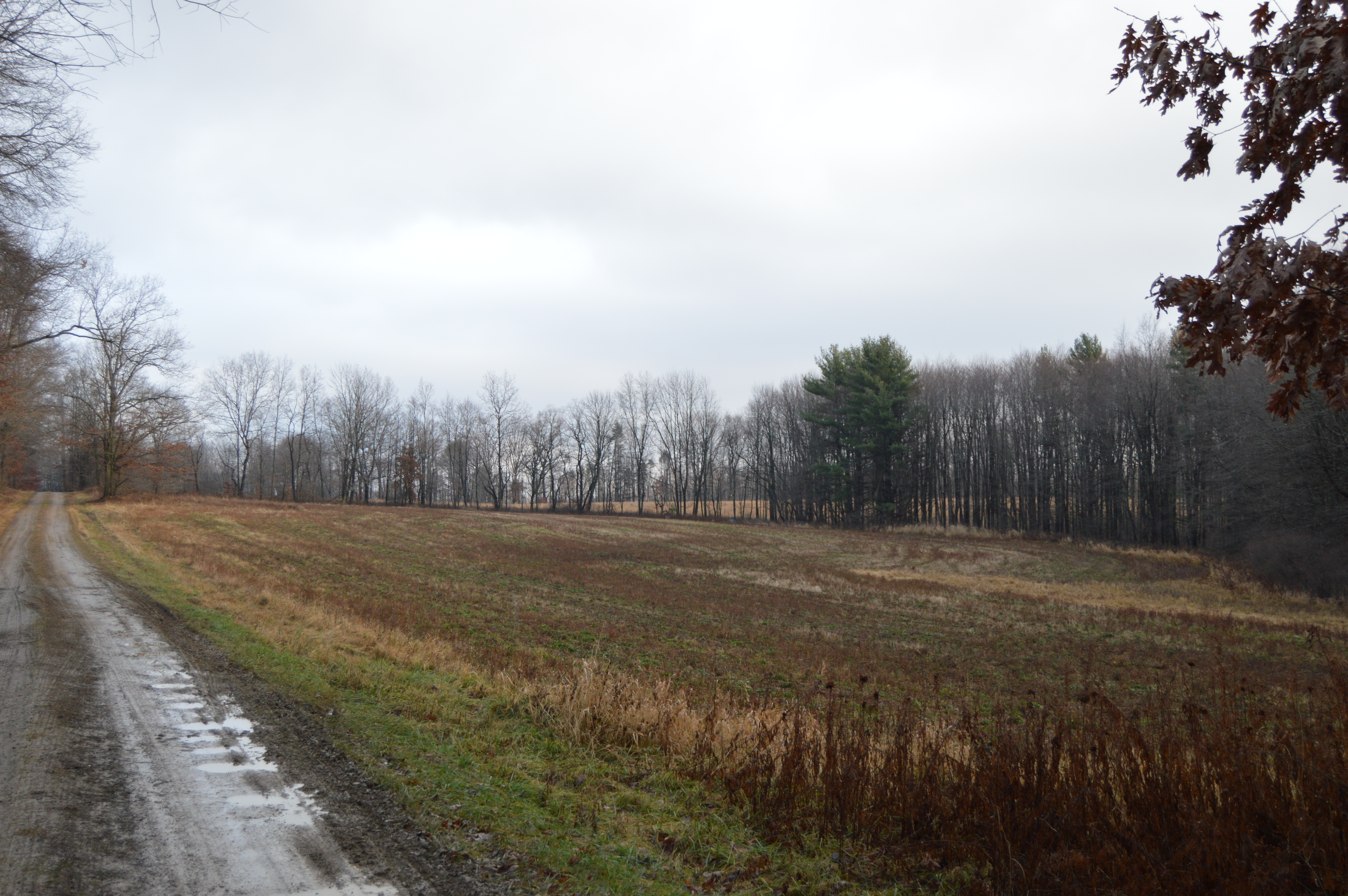
- Fields and woods north of Shippenville

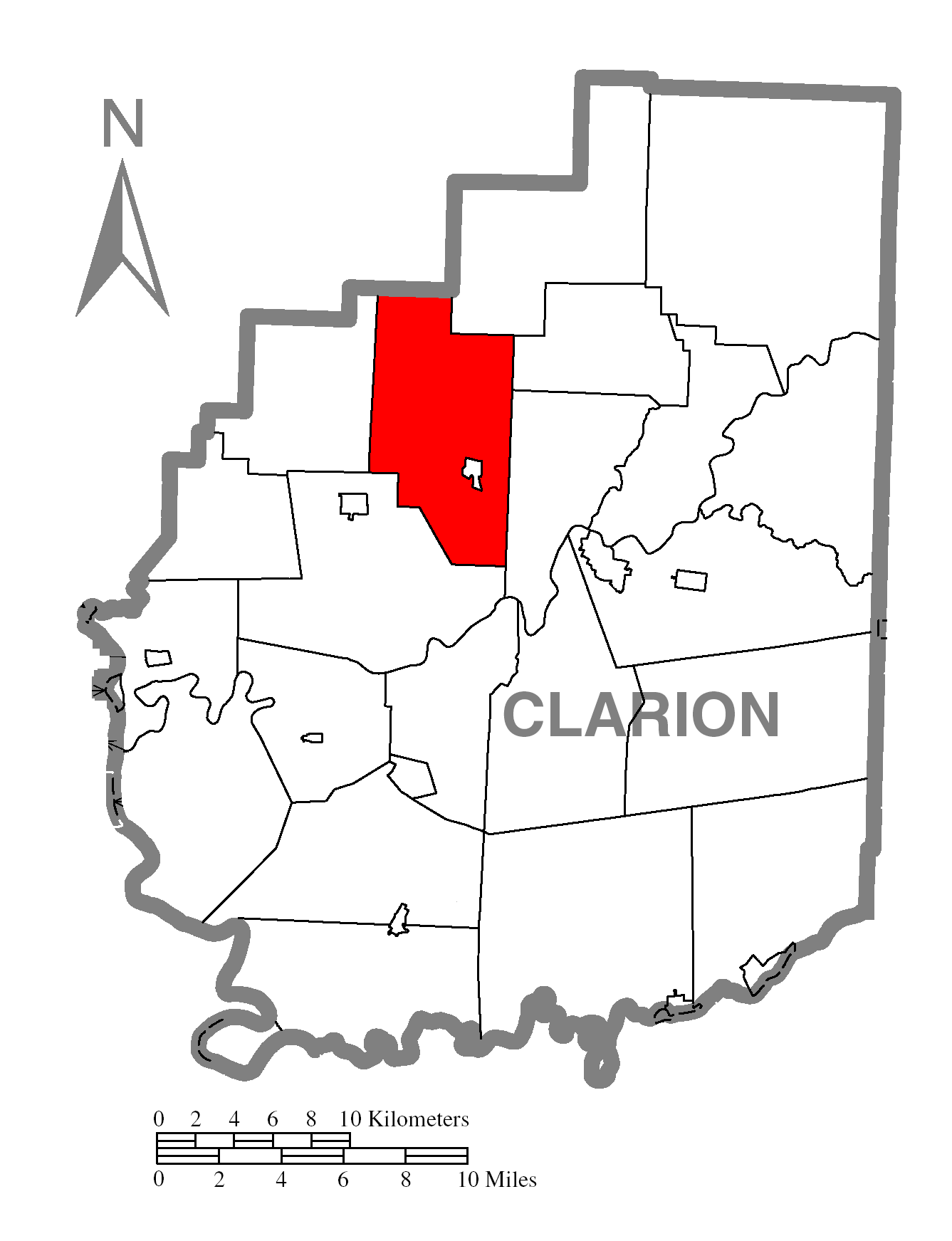
- Map of Clarion County, Pennsylvania highlighting Elk Township

- Map of Clarion County, Pennsylvania
- Country: United States
- State: Pennsylvania
- County: Clarion
- Incorporated: 1806

Area
  - Total: 31.65 sq mi (81.97 km^{2})
  - Land: 31.54 sq mi (81.69 km^{2})
  - Water: 0.11 sq mi (0.29 km^{2})

Population (2020)
  - Total: 1,433 ▼
  - Estimate (2023): 1,400
  - Density: 45.43/sq mi (17.54/km^{2})
- Time zone: UTC-5 (Eastern (EST))
  - Summer (DST): UTC-4 (EDT)
- FIPS code: 42-031-23040

Elk Township is a township in Clarion County, Pennsylvania, United States. The population was 1,433 at the 2020 census, a decrease from the figure of 1,490 tabulated in 2010.

== Geography ==
Elk Township is located northwest of the center of Clarion County and is bordered to the north by Venango County. The borough of Shippenville is in the southeastern part of the township but is a separate municipality. The township contains part of the census-designated place of Marianne.

According to the United States Census Bureau, the township has a total area of 31.7 square miles (82.0 km^{2}), of which 31.5 square miles (81.7 km^{2}) is land and 0.12 square miles (0.3 km^{2}), or 0.35%, is water.

== Demographics ==
Historical population
Census	Pop.	Note	%±
2010	1,490		—
2020	1,433		−3.8%
2023 (est.)	1,400		−2.3%
U.S. Decennial Census

As of the census of 2000, there were 1,519 people, 570 households, and 440 families residing in the township. The population density was 48.5 inhabitants per square mile (18.7/km^{2}). There were 627 housing units at an average density of 20.0/sq mi (7.7/km^{2}). The racial makeup of the township was 99.01% White, 0.07% Native American, 0.13% Asian, and 0.79% from two or more races. Hispanic or Latino of any race were 0.13% of the population.

There were 570 households, out of which 32.5% had children under the age of 18 living with them, 64.6% were married couples living together, 8.4% had a female householder with no husband present, and 22.8% were non-families. 18.6% of all households were made up of individuals, and 8.1% had someone living alone who was 65 years of age or older. The average household size was 2.58 and the average family size was 2.91.

In the township the population was spread out, with 23.4% under the age of 18, 5.9% from 18 to 24, 28.8% from 25 to 44, 25.7% from 45 to 64, and 16.1% who were 65 years of age or older. The median age was 40 years. For every 100 females there were 91.1 males. For every 100 females age 18 and over, there were 91.6 males.

The median income for a household in the township was $38,333, and the median income for a family was $42,202. Males had a median income of $29,500 versus $19,345 for females. The per capita income for the township was $16,883. About 5.3% of families and 6.0% of the population were below the poverty line, including 6.1% of those under age 18 and 1.9% of those age 65 or over.
