= Harmony Historic District =

Historic district in Pennsylvania, United States

- U.S. National Register of Historic Places
- U.S. National Historic Landmark District
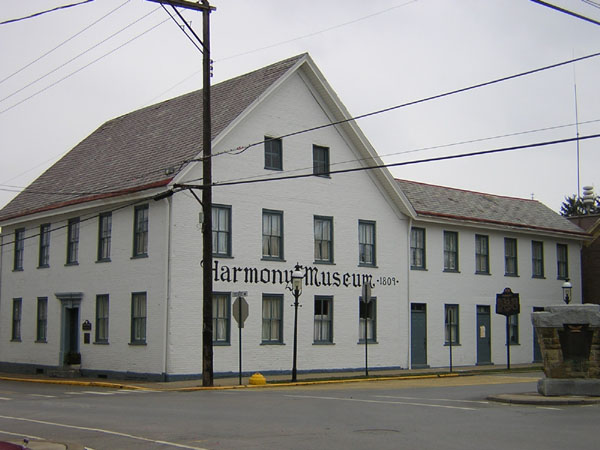
- Harmony Society building in Harmony, Pennsylvania, built in 1809.

- Location within Pennsylvania Location within the United States
- Location: PA 68, Harmony, Pennsylvania
- Coordinates: 40°48′11″N 80°7′42″W
- Area: 17 acres (6.9 ha)
- Built: 1804
- Architect: George Rapp and Frederick Reichert Rapp
- Architectural style: 19th Century German-American
- NRHP reference No.: 73002139

Significant dates
- Added to NRHP: March 21, 1973
- Designated NHLD: May 30, 1974

The Harmony Historic District encompasses the first early 19th century settlement of the Harmony Society, in what is now Harmony, Butler County, Pennsylvania, United States. It covers an area two blocks wide, extending north from German Road to Conoquenessing Creek between Liberty and Wood Streets. The area retains a number of buildings dating to the original settlement period, and was designated a National Historic Landmark District in 1974.

== Description and history ==
The Harmony Society was founded in what is now Germany in 1785 by Johann Georg Rapp. Meeting with opposition from the dominant Lutheran Church, Rapp and his followers emigrated to North America, and purchased the land in Butler County where the community of 200 families founded Harmony in 1805. The utopian community was run as a communist theocracy, with Rapp and later his son as its leading figure. The Harmonist community was successful, growing to about 700 by 1814, when Rapp's son Frederick established a new settlement in the Indiana Territory, now New Harmony, Indiana. They eventually moved back to Pennsylvania, settling Economy in 1825, and died out as an organization in 1905.

The surviving elements of the early Harmonist settlement include a grid of streets in the heart of the modern town of Harmony, and a number of primarily brick buildings in that area. The district includes ten contributing buildings and one contributing site. Principal among these are the George Rapp House, Great House or Bentle Building (c. 1811), Langenbacher House (c. 1805), Harmonist Church (1808), The "Stohr," Beam Hotel, Frederick Rapp House, Schmitt House, Jacob Neff House (c.1807), Schreiber House, Wagner House, and Mueller House. The original Harmonist Cemetery contains the unmarked graves of 100 early Harmonists.

== See also ==
- List of National Historic Landmarks in Pennsylvania
- National Register of Historic Places listings in Butler County, Pennsylvania
