= George Rapp =

Founder of the Harmonists (1757 – 1847)

Johann Georg Rapp
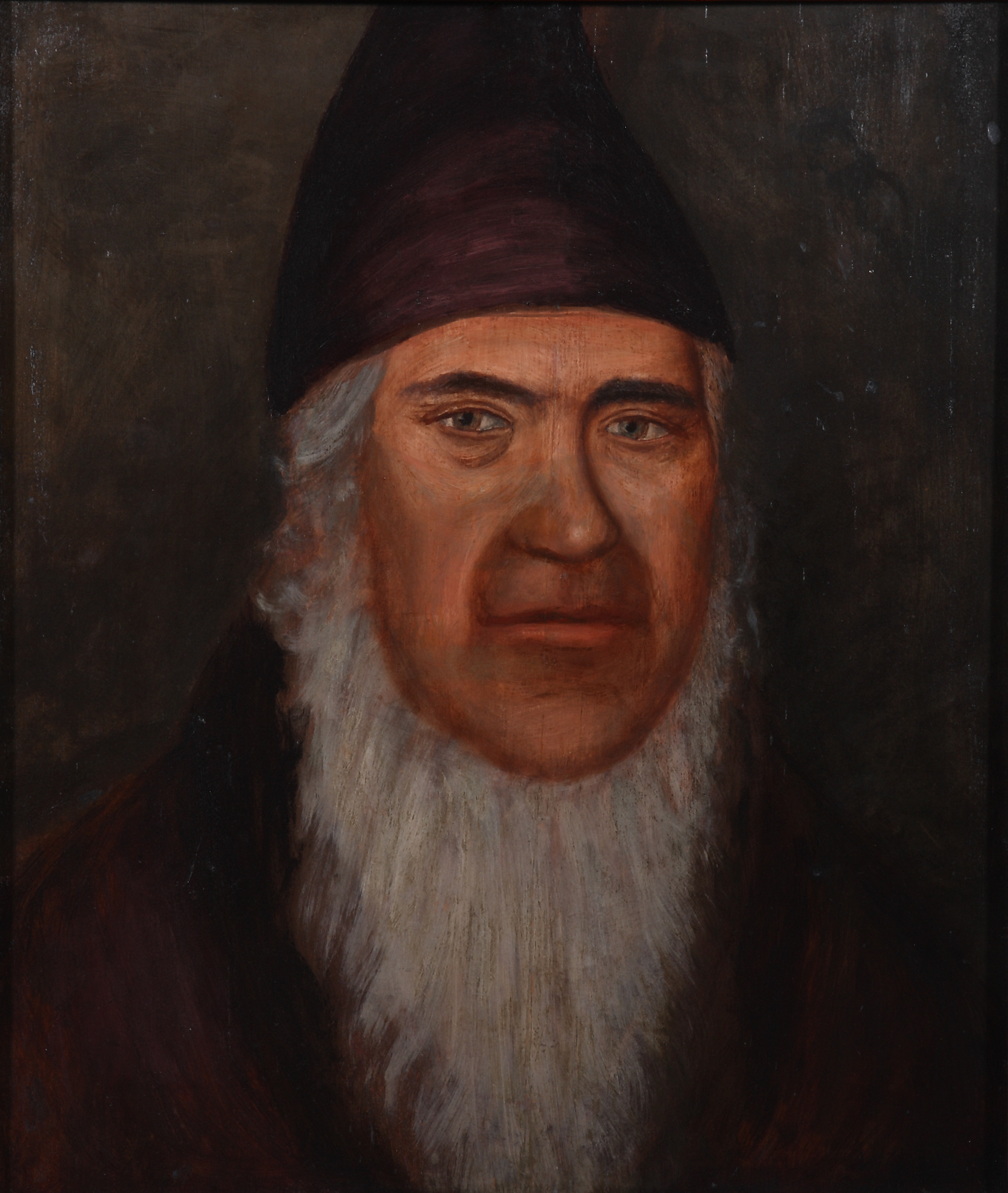
- Rapp as painted from memory by Phineas Staunton (1835)
- Born: November 1, 1757; Iptingen, Duchy of Württemberg, Germany
- Died: August 7, 1847 (aged 89); Economy, Pennsylvania, United States
- Occupation: Religious colonizer
- Spouse: Christine Benzinger
- Children: Johannes Rapp (1783–1812) and Rosine Rapp (1786–1849)

John George Rapp (German: Johann Georg Rapp; November 1, 1757 – August 7, 1847) was the founder of the religious sect called the Harmony Society and associated communes.

Born in Iptingen, Germany, Rapp became inspired by the philosophies of Jakob Böhme, Philipp Jakob Spener, and Emanuel Swedenborg, among others. In the 1780s, Rapp began preaching and gathering a group of followers. His group officially split with the Lutheran Church in 1785 and was promptly banned from meeting. The persecution that Rapp and his followers experienced caused them to leave Germany and come to the United States in 1803. Rapp was a pietist, and many of his beliefs were shared by the Anabaptists and Shakers.

== Early life ==
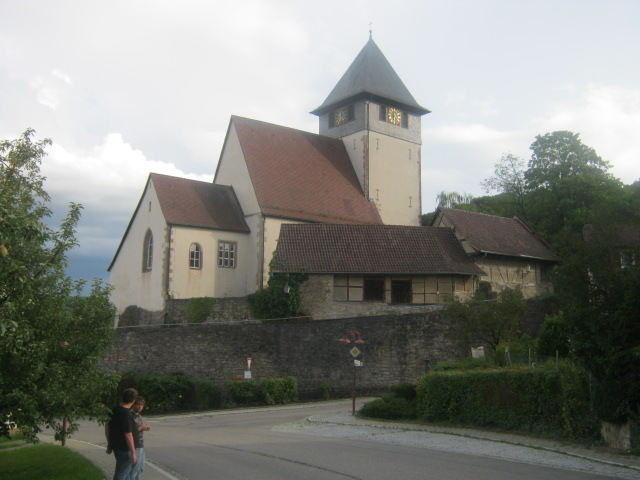
Church at Iptingen, Rapp's home village

Rapp was born on November 1, 1757, to Rosine Berger and Hans Adam Rapp (1720–71) in the village of Iptingen, 25 miles (40 km) northwest of Stuttgart in the Duchy of Württemberg. Rapp was the second child and oldest son of the family. His brother Adam (born March 9, 1762) and three sisters Marie Dorothea (born October 11, 1756), Elise Dorothea (born August 7, 1760), and Maria Barbara (born October 21, 1765) later followed him to America; however, Adam died at sea.

Rapp learned the art of wine making from his father, a farmer. After his father's death in 1771, Rapp trained as a journeyman weaver. He also developed an interest in preaching. Vineyards and textiles would become a part of the agricultural, manufacturing, and commercial economy in all three of the Harmonite towns that were later founded in the United States.

== Harmony Society ==
In 1791 Rapp said, "I am a prophet and I am called to be one" in front of the civil affairs official in Maulbronn, Germany, who promptly had him imprisoned for two days and threatened with exile if he did not cease preaching. To the consternation of church and state authorities, Rapp had become the outspoken leader of several thousand Separatists in the southern German duchy of Württemberg. In 1798 Rapp and his group of followers had further distanced themselves from mainstream society. In the Lomersheimer Declaration, written in 1798, Rapp's followers refused to serve in the military or attend Lutheran schools. By 1802, the Separatists had grown to about 12,000, and the Württemberg government decided that they were a threat to social order. Rapp was summoned to Maulbronn for an interrogation, and the government confiscated Separatist books. When released in 1803, Rapp told his followers to pool their assets and follow him on a journey for safety to the "land of Israel" in the United States, and soon over 800 people were living with him there.

The initial move scattered the followers and reduced Rapp's original group of 12,000 to many fewer persons. In 1804 Rapp was able to secure a large tract of land in Pennsylvania and started his first commune. This first commune, Harmonie, (Harmony, Pennsylvania) grew to a population of about 800. The Harmony Society was formally organized on February 15, 1805, and its members contracted to hold all property in common and to submit to spiritual and material leadership by Rapp and associates. In 1807, celibacy was advocated as the preferred custom of the community in an attempt to purify themselves for the coming Millennium.

In 1814 the society sold their town to Mennonites for 10 times the amount originally paid for the land, and the entire commune moved west to Indiana where their new town was also known as Harmony. Ten years after the move to Indiana the commune moved again, this time it returned to Pennsylvania and named their town Ökonomie,' Economy. The Indiana settlement was sold to Robert Owen, at which point it was renamed New Harmony, Indiana. Rapp lived out his remaining days in Economy, Pennsylvania, until August 7, 1847, when he died at age 89.

== Family ==
On February 4, 1783, Rapp married Christine Benzinger of Friolzheim. The couple had two children, Johannes and Rosine. Johannes trained as a surveyor and died at 29 in an industrial accident. Johannes's name is the only one listed on a stone in the Harmonist cemetery in Harmony, Pennsylvania (the Harmonists did not mark their graves.) The marker was donated by non-Harmonists, and the society accepted it reluctantly. The specific location of Johannes's gravesite within the cemetery is unknown. Johannes's daughter Gertrude (1808–89) became a minor American celebrity and organized the society's silk production at Economy, Pennsylvania.

Rapp adopted Frederick Reichert (April 12, 1775 – June 24, 1834). Reichert organized the relocation of Rapp's followers from Württemberg to Pennsylvania in 1804 and supervised the immigration of others to the United States. Reichert, who became known as Frederick Rapp, was the business leader and public spokesman for the Harmony Society, drew up the town plan for its Indiana location in 1814 and served as one of the delegates to the Indiana Territory's Constitutional Convention in 1816. Frederick Rapp also helped choose the site for the permanent seat of government of Indiana in 1820 that was later named Indianapolis and held leadership roles in several Indiana banks. After the Harmonists sold their Indiana land in 1824, he relocated with other members of the society to Economy, where he died in 1834.

== Religious views ==
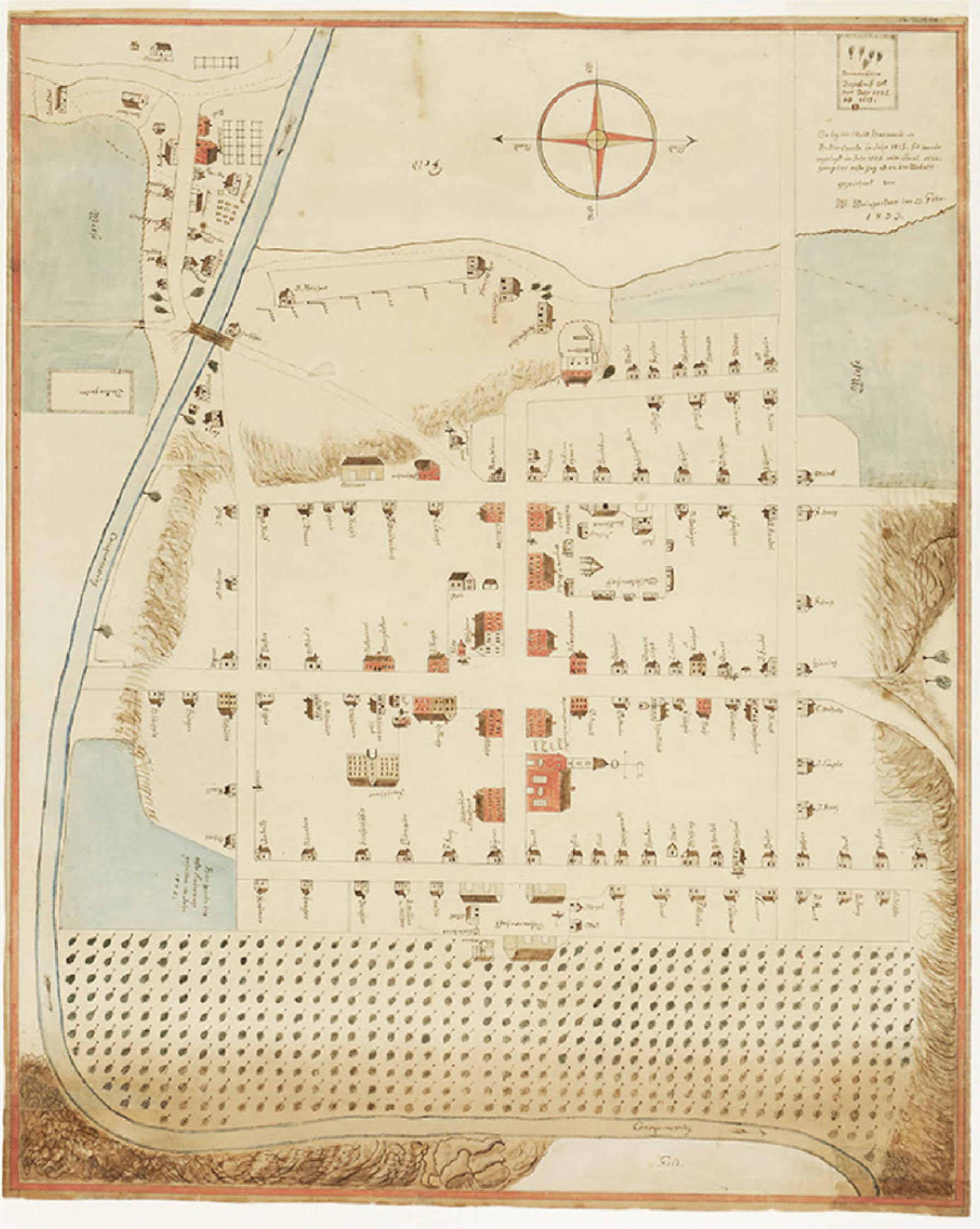
Map of Harmony (1833)

Rapp and his followers believed Christ would return in their lifetime to help usher in a thousand-year kingdom of peace on earth. The purpose of the community was to be worthy of Christ and prepare for his return. They were nonviolent pacifists, refused to serve in the military, and tried to live by Rapp's philosophy and literal interpretations of the New Testament. Rapp believed that the events and wars going on in the world at the time were a confirmation of his views regarding the imminent Second Coming of Christ, and he viewed Napoleon as the Antichrist. Rapp produced a book with his ideas and philosophy, Thoughts on the Destiny of Man, published in German in 1824 and in English a year later.

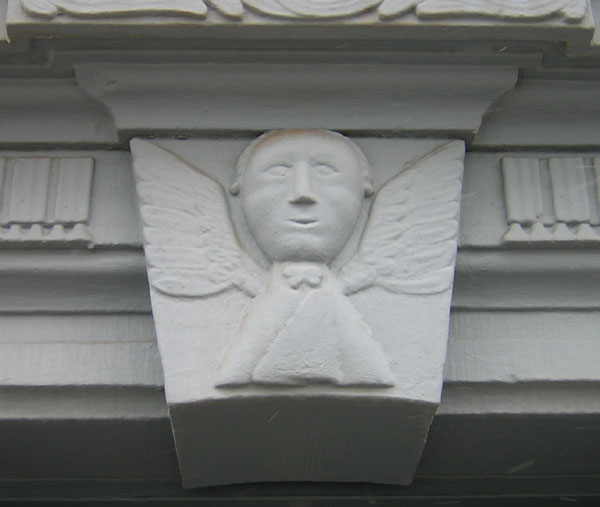
Virgin Sophia design on doorway in Harmony, Pennsylvania, carved by Frederick Reichert Rapp (1775–1834).

The Harmonites were Millennialists. This is perhaps why they believed that people should try to make themselves "pure" and "perfect", and share things with others while willingly living in communal "harmony" (Acts 4:32-37) and practicing celibacy. They believed that the old ways of life on earth were coming to an end, and that a new perfect kingdom on earth was about to be realized. They practiced socialism within their community but traded their exotic agricultural goods (including lemons and figs grown in movable greenhouses) with others.

Harmonites practiced forms of esoteric Christianity and Christian mysticism, and Rapp often spoke of the virgin spirit or goddess named Sophia in his writings. Rapp was influenced by the writings of Jakob Böhme, Philipp Jakob Spener, and Emanuel Swedenborg, among others. In Economy, Pennsylvania, there are glass bottles and literature that seem to indicate that the group was interested in (and practiced) alchemy. Some other books that were found in the Harmony Society's library in Old Economy include those by the following authors: Christoph Schütz, Gottfried Arnold, Justinus Kerner, Thomas Bromley, Jane Leade, Johann Scheible (Sixth and Seventh Books of Moses), Paracelsus, and Georg von Welling (Opus Mago-Cabalisticum).

The Harmonites tended to view unmarried, celibate life as morally superior to marriage, based on Rapp's belief that God had originally created Adam as a dual being having male and female sexual organs. According to this view, when the female portion of Adam separated to form Eve, disharmony followed, but one could attempt to regain harmony through celibacy.

== Controversy and problems ==
Rapp and the Harmony Society were involved in protracted legal cases: many relating to the monetary claims by former society members who did not feel properly compensated for their time and labor, other cases concerned the ownership and sale of property society members left in Württemberg, and legal complications from fines and payments made to avoid militia service. Rapp was called a tyrant and society members his slaves. During elections, the society was seen as a monolithic voting block which caused political ill feelings and generated animosity against Rapp. He was accused of killing his son Johannes.

Rapp predicted that on September 15, 1829, the three and one half years of the Sun Woman would end and Christ would begin his reign on earth. Dissension grew when Rapp's predictions went unfulfilled. Perhaps his greatest error was in 1831 when he accepted Bernhard Müller, who called himself Maximilian Count de Leon, the "Lion of Judah" as the man who would unite all true Christians. Within a year Rapp had changed his mind, but one third of the society members separated and joined with Müller in establishing a separate community, the New Philadelphian Congregation. After Rapp's death in 1847, members left the group because of disappointment and disillusionment over the fact that his prophecies regarding the return of Jesus Christ in his lifetime were not fulfilled. His last words to his followers were, "If I did not so fully believe, that the Lord has designated me to place our society before His presence in the land of Canaan, I would consider this my last".

The Harmonite commune ultimately failed because the policy of celibacy prevented new members from within, and the majority of the outside world had no desire to give up so much to live in a commune. The society was formally dissolved in 1906.
