= Bernhard Müller =

German alchemist (1788–1834)

Bernhard Müller, or Count de Leon
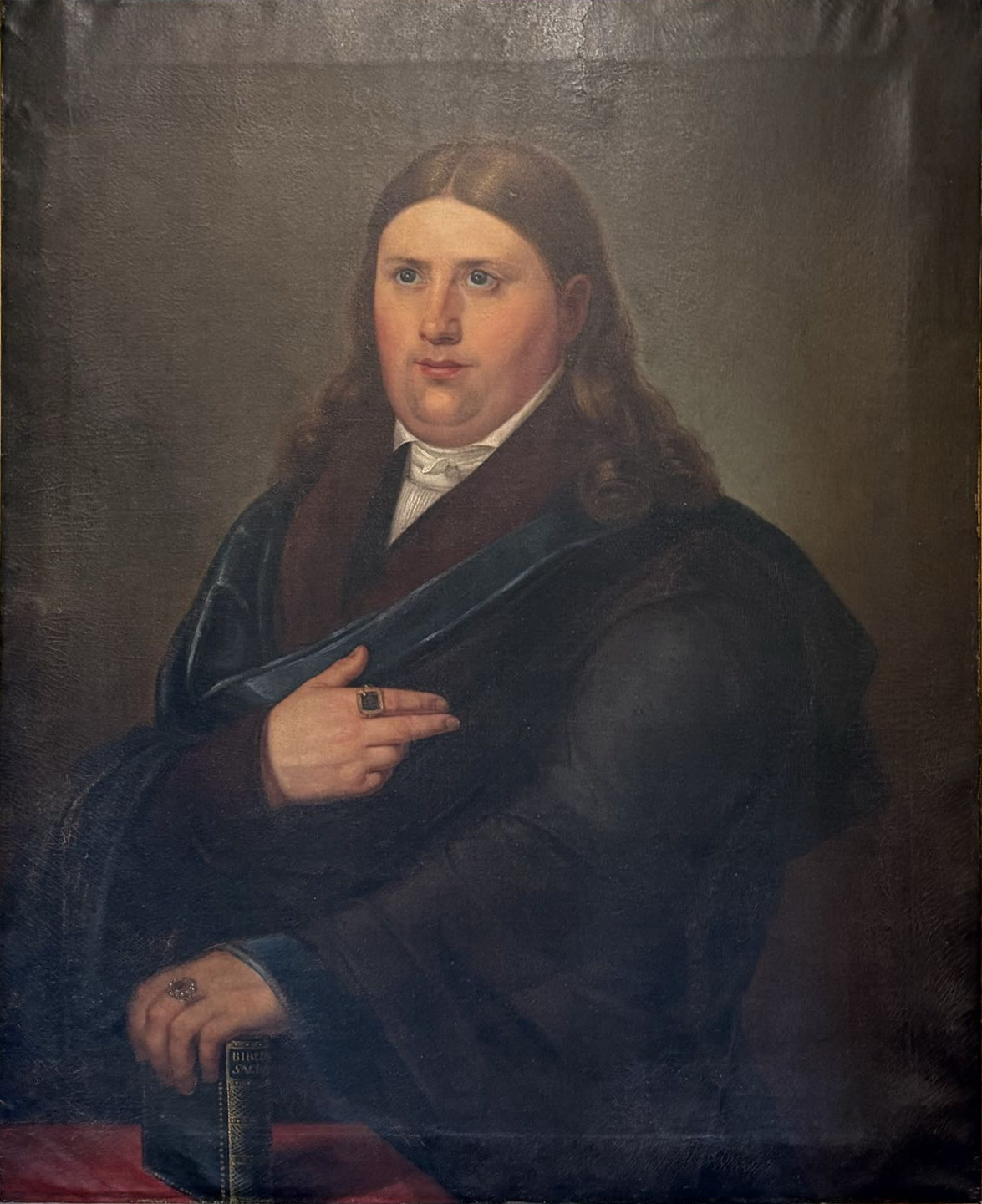
- Born: March 21, 1788; Kostheim, Holy Roman Empire
- Died: August 29, 1834 (aged 46); Grand Ecore; Natchitoches Parish; Louisiana, United States
- Occupation: Religious colonizer
- Spouse: Elisa Heuser Leon, or Countess Leon
- Children: Johanna Schardt, Joseph Maximilian, and Anna Stahl Muller (or Leon)

Bernhard Müller, known as Count de Leon (born March 21, 1788, Kostheim, Germany - died August 29, 1834, Natchitoches Parish, Louisiana), was a German Christian mystic and alchemist of uncertain origins.

== Biography ==
Müller wrote to the Harmony Society (and other communes in the United States as well as numerous leaders in Europe) in 1829 proclaiming himself to be the "Lion of Judah" and a prophet in possession of the Philosopher's stone. As well as giving himself numerous fictitious names and titles, like Count de Leon, Archduke Maximilian von Este, and Proli, he claimed that he and his followers were the true Philadelphians and were ready to make a home for themselves with the Harmonites in Old Economy, Pennsylvania. The Harmonites, being religious searchers looking for a hopeful sign, and eager to justify their own religious prophesies, agreed to the visit, and in 1831, Müller arrived with his entourage of forty people (including a Dr. Göntgen). Soon, Müller and the Harmony Society's leader, George Rapp, grew tired of each other and began to argue. Sensing the dissatisfaction that some Harmonites were feeling towards the Society's custom of celibacy, Müller was able to use that to his advantage and get about a third of the Harmonites to be on his side in the ensuing argument. However, the majority of the Society decided to keep George Rapp as their leader. In the end, a settlement was reached with the dissenters, and all who wished to leave the Harmony Society during the schism were given $105,000 as a group.

In 1832, after leaving Old Economy, Pennsylvania, with about 250 former Harmony Society members, Bernhard Müller and his followers started a new community in Phillipsburg (now Monaca, Pennsylvania) with the money they obtained in the compromise with the Harmony Society. Here they established the New Philadelphian Congregation of the New Philadelphia Society, having constructed a church, a hotel, and other buildings. They renamed this community Löwenburg (Lion City). However, the Harmony Society soon made legal claims against the New Philadelphia Society. Perhaps because of ongoing litigation, and other financial problems, Müller's group decided to sell their communal land in Pennsylvania in 1833. Some community members stayed in Monaca in Beaver County, Pennsylvania, while others followed Müller and his family down the Ohio River on a flatboat. Soon they started a new colony at Grand Ecore, Louisiana, twelve miles north of Natchitoches; and there, in August, 1834, Müller died of yellow fever or cholera and was interred in Natchitoches Parish.

A number of his followers remained in Louisiana and practiced communal living for some years after that. When Müller died, a congressman successfully proposed a bill donating a tract of land to his followers, and Germantown Colony was formed.

In 1835, the remaining group, led by Müller's widow, Countess Leon, moved from Grand Ecore to a place that is now called Germantown, which is located seven miles (11 km) northeast of Minden, in what was then Claiborne Parish. Here, all property was owned in common and observance of religious principles was required. Though the colony was not very large, only about thirty-five people, it worked together and prospered.

The Civil War led to the end of the Germantown Colony, partially because of their disapproval of the war and the financial losses they suffered as a small pacifistic community during wartime, and because of the economic hardships of the war era in general. The colony disbanded in 1871, after nearly four decades of operating on a communal basis, and then Webster Parish was created from Claiborne Parish. The Countess then moved to Hot Springs in Garland County, Arkansas, where she died in 1881. The preservation of the Louisiana settlement is maintained by the Germantown Colony and Museum, now operated by the State of Louisiana.

Not long after Müller and his closest followers left Monaca, Pennsylvania, in 1833, a new religious speaker named William Keil showed up in that area in the early 1840s. Keil was able to attract some followers who were former Harmony Society and New Philadelphia Society members, and his group eventually moved away and settled the communal town of Bethel, Missouri, in 1844. By 1850, Bethel had a population of 650. However, the construction of the Hannibal and St. Joseph Railroad threatened Keil's theocracy. From 1853 to 1856, Keil led his followers westward over the Oregon Trail, and eventually settled the town of Aurora, Oregon. Keil died in 1877, and his community was dissolved in 1883.

The Harmony Society, on the other hand, in Old Economy Village, Pennsylvania, lasted until 1905. It was dissolved in 1906.

== Images ==
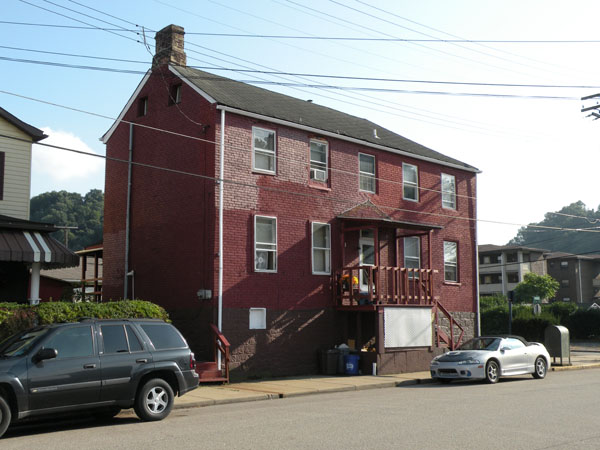
The house where Bernhard Müller lived from 1832 to 1833 in Monaca, Pennsylvania.

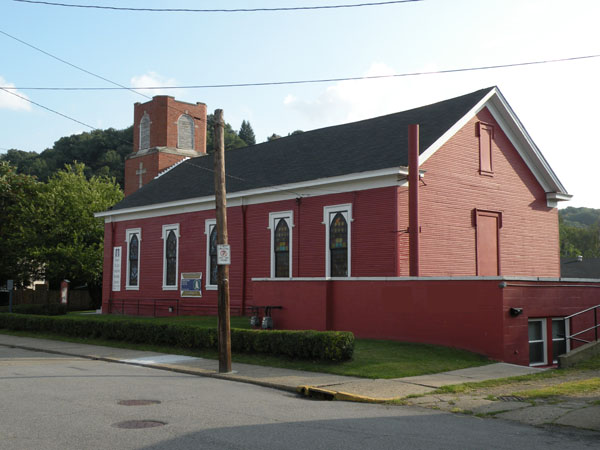
The New Philadelphia Society's church, founded and led by Bernhard Müller from 1832 to 1833, in Monaca, Pennsylvania.

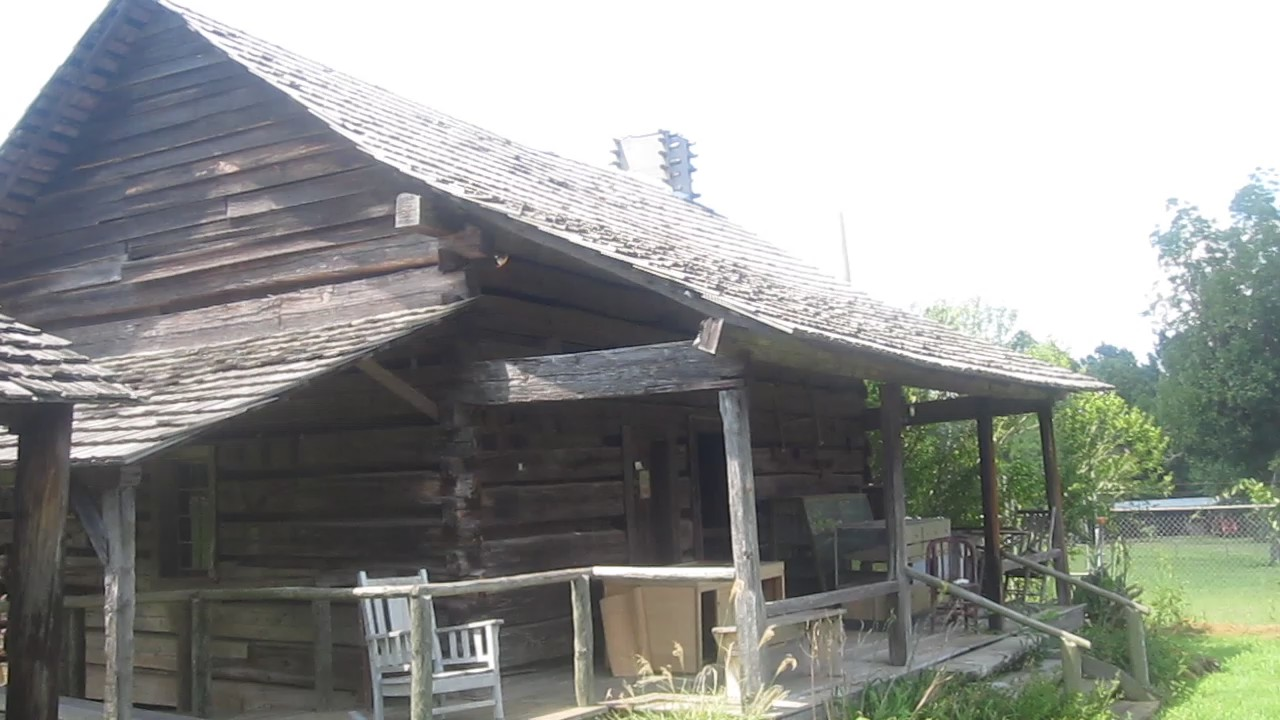
The house where Müller's widow lived from around 1835 to 1871 at the Germantown Colony near Minden, Louisiana.

== See also ==
- Ambridge, Pennsylvania
- Beaver County, Pennsylvania
- Harmony, Pennsylvania
- New Harmony, Indiana
- Germantown Colony and Museum
