= Johann Fischart =

16th-century German writer

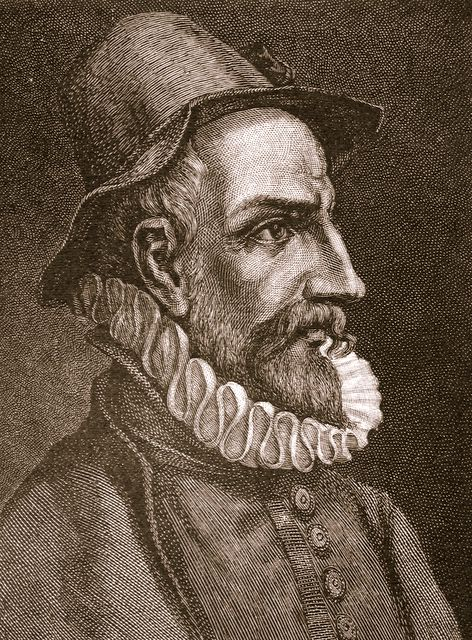
Johann Fischart

Johann Baptist Fischart (c. 1545 – 1591) was a German satirist and publicist.

== Biography ==
Fischart was born, probably, at Strasbourg (but according to some accounts at Mainz), in or about the year 1545, and was educated at Worms in the house of Kaspar Scheid, whom in the preface to his Eulenspiegel he mentions as his cousin and preceptor. He appears to have travelled in Italy, the Netherlands, France, and England, and on his return to have taken the degree of doctor juris at Basel.

Most of his works were written from 1575 to 1581. During this period, he lived with, and probably was associated in the business of, his sister's husband, Bernhard Jobin, a printer at Strasbourg who published many of Fischart's books. In 1581, Fischart was attached as advocate to the Reichskammergericht (imperial court of appeal) at Speyer. In 1583, he married and was appointed Amtmann (magistrate) at Forbach near Saarbrücken. He died there in the winter of 1590–1591.

== Influence ==
Thirty years after Fischart's death, his writings, once so popular, were almost entirely forgotten. Recalled to public attention by Johann Jakob Bodmer and Gotthold Ephraim Lessing, it was only around the end of the 1800s that his works came to be a subject of academic investigation and his position in German literature to be fully understood.

Fischart not only studied ancient literature, but also the literature of Italy, France, the Netherlands, and England. He was a lawyer, a theologian, a satirist, and the most powerful Protestant publicist of the Counter-Reformation period. In politics he was a republican. His satire was levelled mercilessly at all perversities in the public and private life of his time, at astrological superstition, scholastic pedantry, ancestral pride, but especially at the papal dignity, the lives of the priesthood, and the Jesuits. He indulged in the wildest witticisms, the most extreme caricature, obscenity, and double entendre, all of which he did with a serious purpose.

As a poet, he was characterized by the eloquence and picturesqueness of his style and the symbolical language he employed. He treated the German language with the greatest freedom, coining new words and turns of expression without any regard to analogy, and displaying, in his most arbitrary formations, erudition and wit.

== Works ==
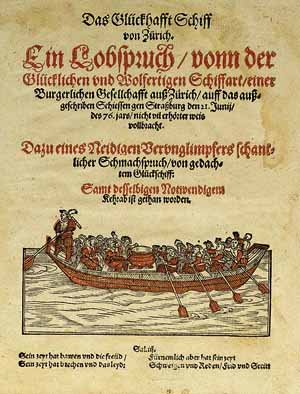
Das glückhafte Schiff von Zürich (title page)

Fischart wrote under pseudonyms; such as Mentzer, Menzer, Reznem, Huidrich Elloposkleros, Jesuwalt Pickhart, Winhold Alkofribas Wustblutus, Ulrich Mansehr von Treubach, and Im Fischen Gilts Mischen. There is doubt whether some of the works attributed to him are really his. More than 50 satirical works, in both prose and verse, remain, and are considered to be his authentic work.

Among works believed to be his are:

- Nachtrab oder Nebelkräh, a satire against Jakob Rabe, a Catholic convert (1570)
- Von St. Dominici des Predigermönchs und St. Francisci Barfüssers artlichem Leben, a poem with the expressive motto Sie haben Nasen und riechens nit ("Ye have noses and smell it not"), written to defend the Protestants against certain accusations, one of which was that Martin Luther held communion with the devil (1571)
- Eulenspiegel Reimensweis (written 1571, published 1572)
- Aller Praktik Grossmutter, after Rabelais' Prognostication Pantagrueline (1572, Johann Scheible ed. 1847)
- Flöh Haz, Weiber Traz, in which he describes a battle between fleas and women (1573, Scheible ed. 1848)
- Affentheuerliche und ungeheuerliche Geschichtschrift vom Leben, Rhaten und Thaten der . . . Helden und Herren Grandgusier Gargantoa und Pantagruel, also after Rabelais (1575, and again under the modified title, Naupengeheurliche Geschichtklitterung, 1577)
- Neue künstliche Figuren biblischer Historien (1576)
- Anmahnung zur christlichen Kinderzucht (1576)
- Das glückhafft Schiff von Zürich (The Lucky Ship of Zürich), a poem commemorating the adventure of a company of Zürich arquebusiers, who sailed from their native town to Strasbourg in one day, and brought, as a proof of this feat, a kettleful of Hirsebrei (millet gruel), which had been cooked in Zürich, still warm, into Strasbourg, and intended to illustrate the proverb "perseverance overcomes all difficulties" (1576, republished 1828, with an introduction by the poet Ludwig Uhland)
- Podagrammisch Trostbüchlein (1577, Scheible ed. 1848) in which he coins the term "gänswein", goose wine
- Philosophisch Ehzuchtbüchlein (1578, Scheible ed. 1848)
- Bienenkorb des heiligen römischen Immenschwarms, &c., a modification of the Dutch De roomsche Byen-Korf, by Philipp Marnix of St. Aldegonde (1579, reprinted 1847)
- Der heilig Brotkorb, after Calvin's Traité des reliques (1580)
- Das vierhörnige Jesuiterhütlein, a rhymed satire against the Jesuits (1580)

He also wrote a number of shorter poems. To Fischart also have been attributed some Psalmen und geistliche Lieder which appeared in a Strasbourg hymn-book of 1576.
