= Thomas Murner =

German writer

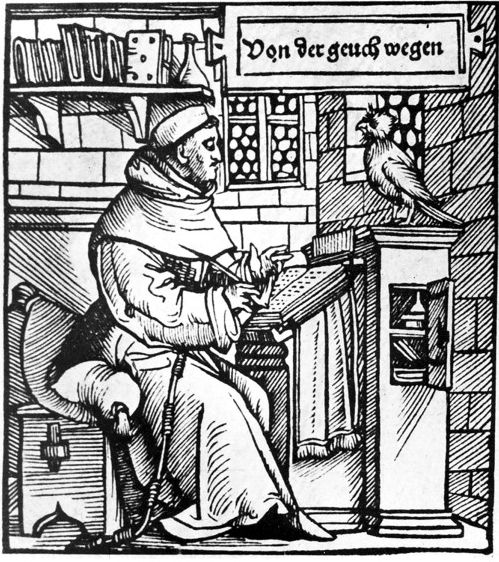
Thomas Murner as chancellor of the Gäuchmatt. Ambrosius Holbein (1519)

Thomas Murner, OFM (24 December 1475 – c. 1537) was an Alsatian satirist, poet and translator.

== Early life and education ==
He was born at Oberehnheim (Obernai) near Strasbourg. In 1490 he entered the Franciscan order, and in 1495 began travelling, studying and then teaching and preaching in Freiburg-im-Breisgau, Paris, Cracow and Strasbourg itself. The emperor Maximilian I crowned him in 1505 poeta laureatus; in 1506, he was created doctor theologiae. In 1508, while a preacher of the St.Martin church in Freiburg, he defied a recently died and relative of Ulrich Zasius as well as the scribe of Freiburg. Since, both shall have let Murner know of their enmity. In 1513 was appointed custodian of the Franciscan monastery in Strasbourg, an office which he was forced to vacate the following year for having published a scurrilous book.

== Professional career ==
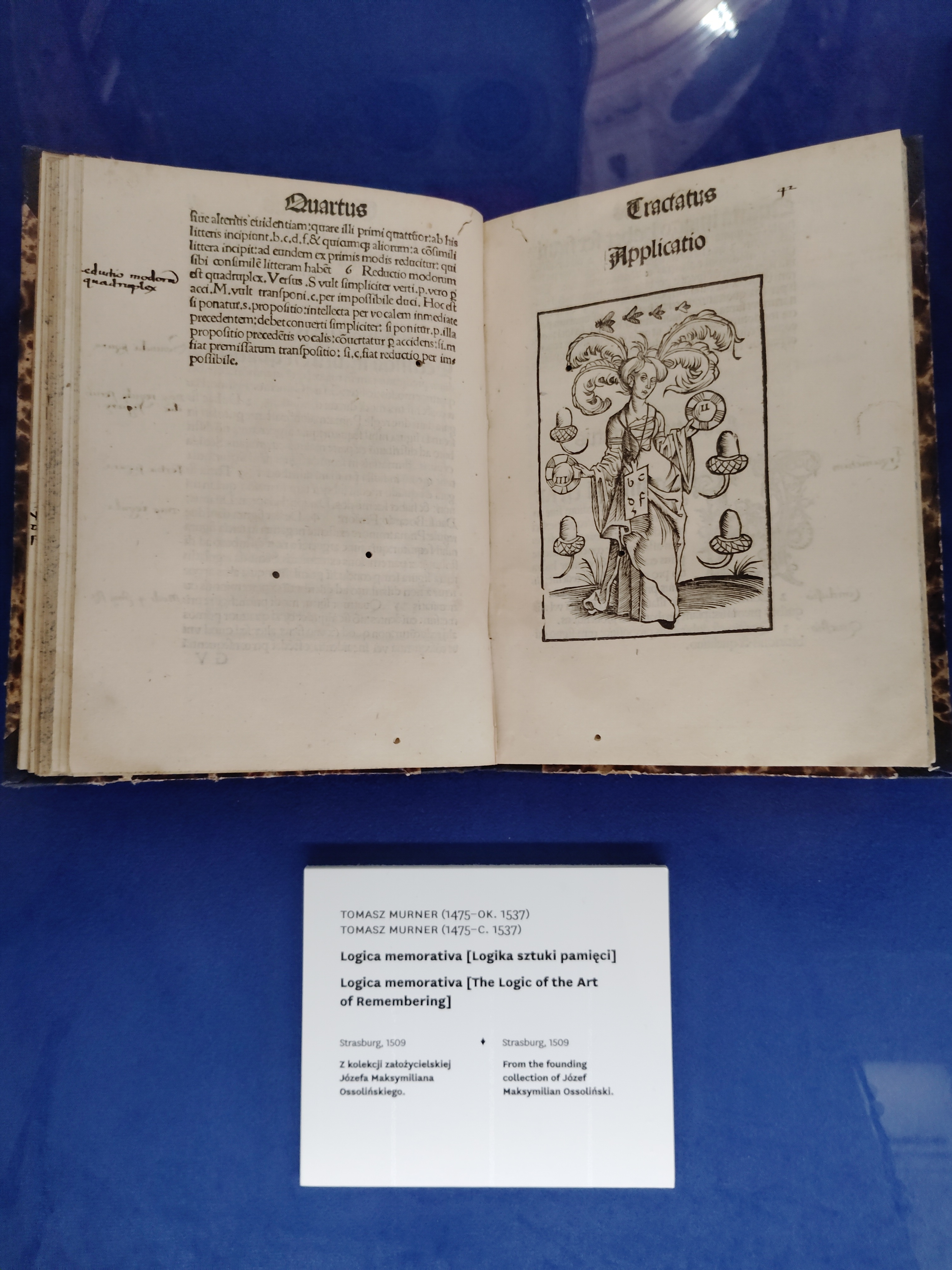
The Logic of the Art of the Remembering. Edition 1509. Collections of the Ossolineum in Wrocław, Poland. Exhibition in May 2026

In 1518, he began the study of jurisprudence at the University of Basel, and in 1519 took the degree of doctor juris. Zasius tried to prevent his graduation appealing to the professor of the University Claudius Catiuncula, but without success. In jurisprudence, Murner focused on the Institutes of Justinian and their translation in the German language from Latin. He hoped that in their native language, the students would have a better understanding of the jurisprudence before often learned from books in a foreign language. In October 1518 his book Utriusque iuris Tituli et Regule was published by Adam Petri in Basel which still included most of the text still in both languages, Latin and German. In April 1519, he published the Instituten in warer ursprung, where the foreword and text were held in the German language and the chapters printed in Latin. But also the chapters counted with a translation into the German language.

In the summer of 1523, at the invitation of Henry VIII, he went to the Kingdom of England, where his writings had caught the attention of Thomas More.

John Headley credits Murner for making More aware of the radical nature of Martin Luther's ecclesiology. Henry VIII felt that Murner was an important orthodox influence in Strasbourg and gave him £100 and a letter to the city magistrates.

After this stay, and a journey to Italy, he again settled in Strasbourg, but, disturbed by the Protestant Reformation, went into exile at Lucerne in Switzerland in 1526. In 1533 he was appointed priest of Oberehnheim, where he died in 1537, or, according to some accounts, in 1536.

Murner was an energetic and passionate character, but made enemies wherever he went. There is little human kindness in his satires, which were directed against the corruption of the times, the Reformation, and especially against Martin Luther. His most powerful satire—the most virulent German satire of the period—is Von dem grossen Lutherischen Narren wie ihn Doctor Murner beschworen hat ("On the Great Lutheran Fool", 1522). Others included Die Narrenbeschwörung (1512); Die Schelmenzunft (1512); Die Gäuchmatt, which treats of enamoured fools (1519), and a translation of Virgil's Aeneid (1515) dedicated to the emperor Maximilian I. Murner also wrote the humorous Chartiludium logicae for the teaching of logic (1507) and the Ludus studentum Friburgensium (1511), besides a translation of Justinian's Institutiones (1519).

Murner's satires were edited in the 1840s by Johann Scheible.
