= Old Economy Village =

- Old Economy
- U.S. National Register of Historic Places
- U.S. National Historic Landmark District
- Pennsylvania state historical marker
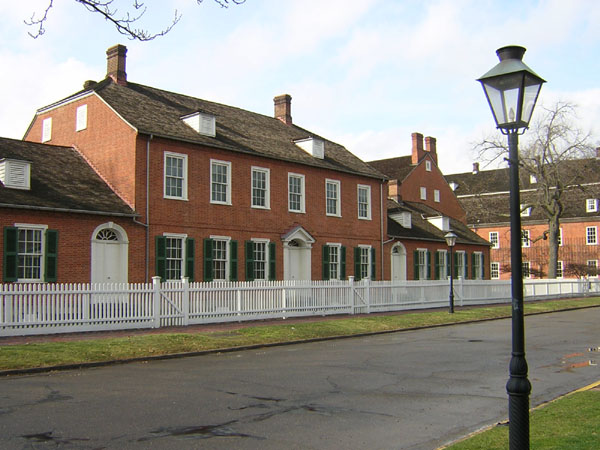
- The Rapp house in Old Economy Village, Pennsylvania.

- Location within Pennsylvania Location within the United States
- Location: Beaver County, Pennsylvania, USA
- Nearest city: Ambridge, Pennsylvania
- Coordinates: 40°35′46.17″N 80°13′58.8″W
- Area: 5 acres (2.0 ha)
- Built: 1824
- Architect: George Rapp and Frederick Reichert Rapp
- Architectural style: 19th Century German-American
- NRHP reference No.: 66000644

Significant dates
- Added to NRHP: October 15, 1966
- Designated NHLD: June 23, 1965

- Economy Historic District
- U.S. National Register of Historic Places
- U.S. Historic district
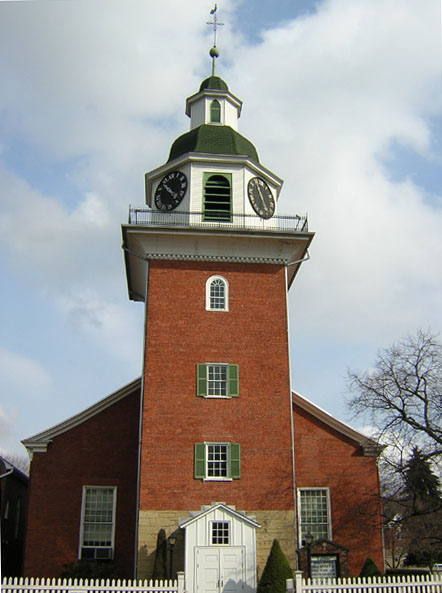
- Harmony Society church in Old Economy Village

- Location within Pennsylvania Location within the United States
- Location: Old Economy Village roughly bounded by PA 65, 12th, Merchant, and 16th Sts., Ambridge, Pennsylvania
- Coordinates: 40°35′46″N 80°13′55″W
- Area: 28 acres (11 ha)
- Built: 1825
- Architect: Harmony Society
- NRHP reference No.: 85001142
- Added to NRHP: May 21, 1985

Old Economy Village is an historic settlement that is located in Ambridge, Beaver County, Pennsylvania, United States. Administered by the Pennsylvania Historical and Museum Commission, it lies on the banks of the Ohio River and is surrounded by downtown Ambridge.

The village is the last of three settlements established by the Harmony Society in the United States (another in Pennsylvania and one in Indiana). Founded in 1824, it was designated as a National Historic Landmark District in 1966 under the name of "Old Economy."

== Harmony Society ==
The Harmony Society was a Christian theosophy and pietist society founded in Iptingen, Germany, in 1785. Due to religious persecution by the Lutheran Church and the government in Württemberg, the Harmony Society moved to the United States between 1803 and 1804, initially purchasing 3,000 acres (12 km^{2}) of land in Butler County, Pennsylvania. On February 15, 1805, society leaders, together with about 400 followers, formally organized the Harmony Society, placing all of their goods in common.

The society was founded and led by Johann Georg Rapp (1757–1847) and his adopted son, Frederick (Reichert) Rapp (1775–1834), and lasted for 100 years – roughly from 1805 until 1905. Members of the society were sometimes called Harmonists, Harmonites, or Rappites.

The Harmony Society built three successive communities, first at Harmony, Pennsylvania (1804–1814), then New Harmony, Indiana (1814–1824), finally settling in Economy (now Ambridge, Pennsylvania).

== Old Economy Village, Pennsylvania ==
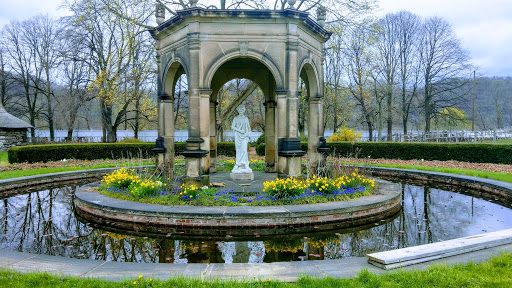
Grotto (far left) and statue of Harmonia in the Harmony Society gardens in Old Economy Village.

The Harmonites named their last town Economy, after the spiritual notion of the Divine Economy. Here, under the business acumen and efficient management of Frederick Rapp, society members enjoyed such prosperity that, by 1829, they dominated the trade and the markets of Pittsburgh and down the Ohio River. Accused of being a monopoly, the society faced pressure to dissolve. At this time, the community was not neglectful of matters pertaining to art and culture. Frederick Rapp purchased and installed a museum, containing fine paintings and many curios and antiquities; they had a deer park, a floral park, and a maze, or labyrinth; the society also had a good orchestra, were fond of music, and gave much attention to its cultivation.

In 1832, the society suffered a serious division. Of 750 members, 250 became alienated through the influence of Bernhard Müller (self-styled Count de Leon), who, with forty followers (also at variance with the authorities in the old country), had come to Economy to affiliate with the society. Rapp and Leon could not agree; a separation and apportionment of the property were therefore effected. This secession of one-third of the society, consisting mostly of the young men and women who did not want to maintain the custom of celibacy, reportedly broke Frederick's heart. He died within two years.

It also resulted in a considerable fracturing of the community. Nevertheless, the society remained prosperous in business investments for many more years to come.

After Frederick Rapp's death, in 1834, the business management passed successively into the hands of George Rapp, who died in 1847 (R. L, Baker and Jacob Henrici, 1847–69; J. Henrici and Jonathan Lenz, 1869–92; J. S. Duss, 1892–1903; Susie C. Duss, 1903–06).

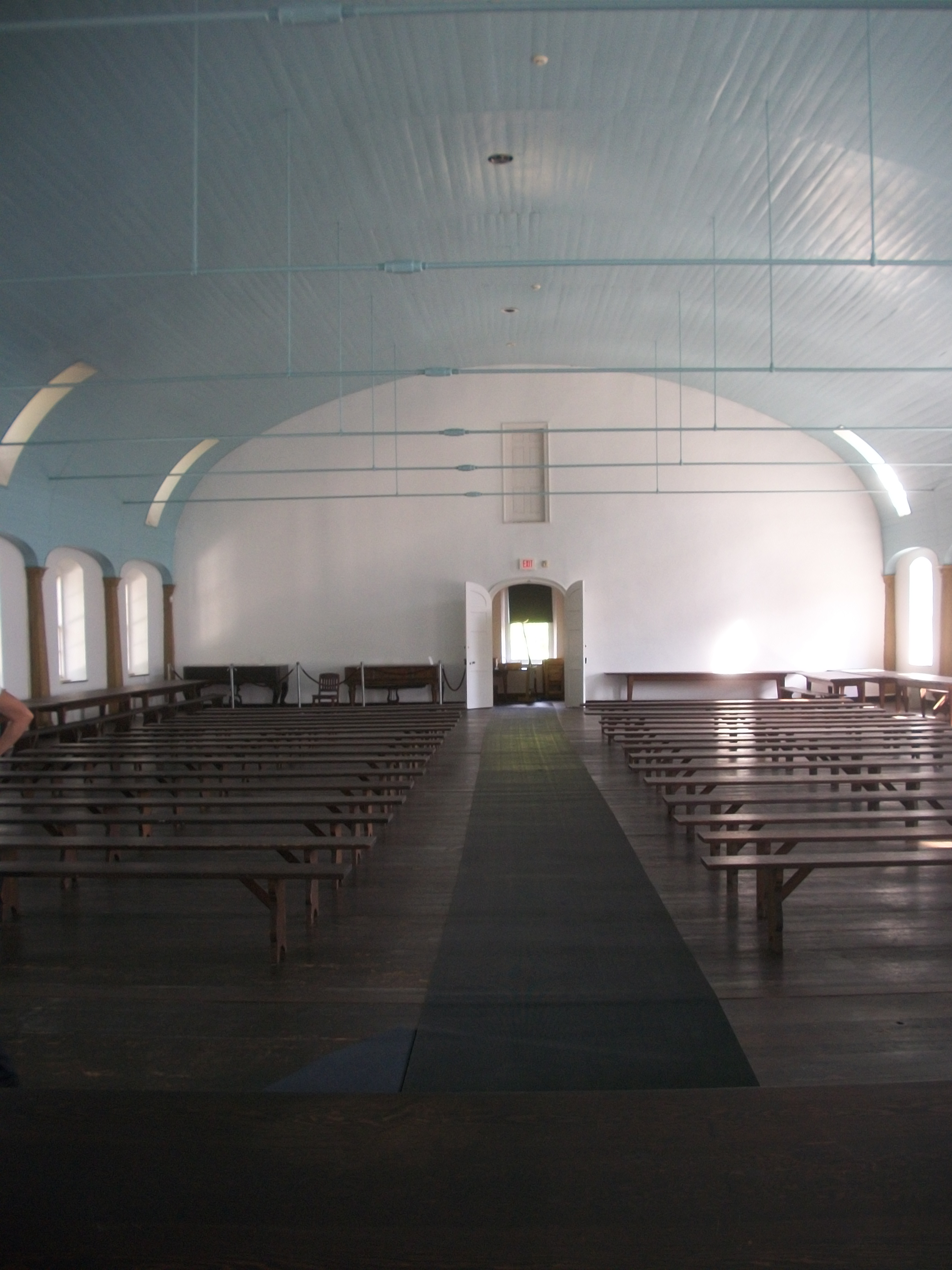
Interior of the Feast Hall, which was used for communal celebrations.

The settlements were economically successful, producing many goods in a clothing factory, a sawmill, a tannery, and from their vineyards and distillery. Society members also produced high quality silk for garments.

The Harmonites were industrious and utilized the latest technologies of the day in their factories. In Economy, the group aided the construction of the Pittsburgh and Lake Erie Railroad, established the Economy Savings Institution and the Economy Brick Works, and operated the Economy Oil Company, Economy Planing Mill, Economy Lumber Company, and eventually donated some land in Beaver Falls for the construction of Geneva College. The society exerted a major influence on the economic development of Western Pennsylvania. But since the group chose to adopt celibacy and the people in the group kept getting older, more work gradually had to be hired out.

The high-water mark of the society's prosperity was at the close of the administration of R. L. Baker in 1868; its wealth at that time being probably $2,000,000. By 1890, however, it was hopelessly in debt, on the verge of bankruptcy, with a depleted membership of aged people. The society was overwhelmed with litigation on the part of would-be heirs. J. S. Duss won the lawsuits and paid the society's indebtedness. The great strain which he had undergone undermining his health, he was forced to resign his trusteeship in 1903. There being but few members left, the remaining land and assets were sold under the leadership of Duss's wife, and the society was formally dissolved in 1906.

In 1916, the Commonwealth of Pennsylvania acquired 6 acres (0.024 km^{2}) and 17 buildings of Old Economy, which became the present-day historic site. Other parts of the society's land were acquired by the American Bridge Company to expand the borough of Ambridge- incorporated in 1905 and named after AMerican BRIDGE . Today, much of Ambridge outside of Old Economy Village is a historic district (the Economy Historic District) listed on the National Register of Historic Places.

== George Rapp ==
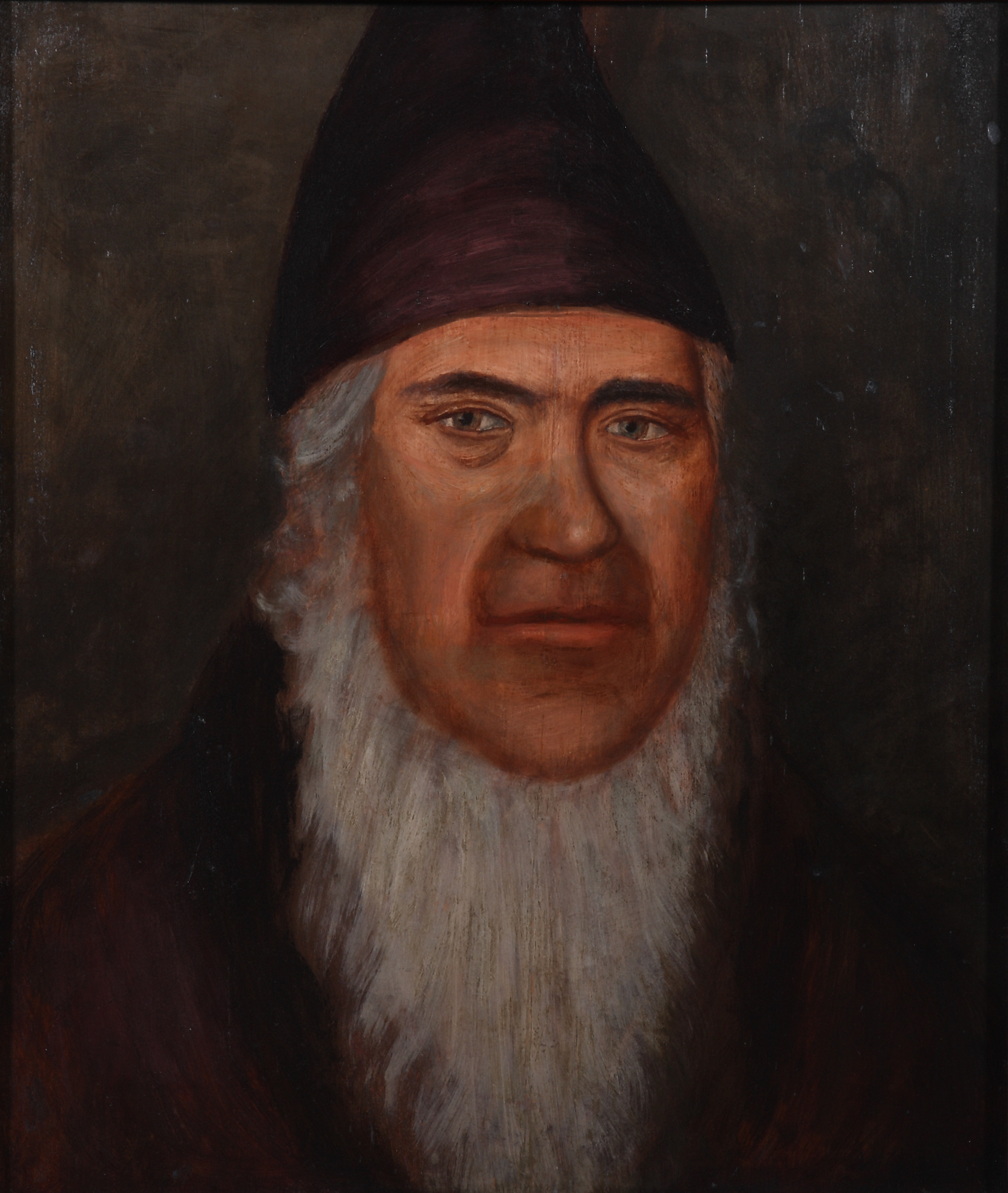
Johann Georg Rapp (George Rapp) 1757–1847.

Johann George Rapp (November 1, 1757 – August 7, 1847) was the founder of the religious sect called Harmonists, Harmonites, Rappites, or the Harmony Society.

Born in Iptingen, Duchy of Württemberg, Germany, Rapp became inspired by the philosophies of Jakob Böhme, Philipp Jakob Spener, and Emanuel Swedenborg, among others. In the 1780s, George Rapp began preaching and soon started to gather a group of his own followers. His group officially split with the Lutheran Church in 1785 and was promptly banned from meeting. The persecution that Rapp and his followers experienced caused them to leave Germany and come to the United States in 1803.

Rapp was a Pietist, and a number of his beliefs were shared by the Anabaptists, as well as groups such as the Shakers. Rapp's religious beliefs and philosophy were the cement that held his community together both in Germany and in America – a Christian community and commune, which in America organized as the Harmony Society.

The Harmony Society built three American towns, became rich, famous, and survived for 100 years – roughly from 1805 until 1905. By 1798, Rapp and his group of followers had already begun to distance themselves from mainstream society. In the Lomersheimer Declaration, written in 1798, Rapp's followers refused to serve in the military or attend Lutheran schools. In 1803, when the government began to persecute Rapp's followers, he decided to move the entire group to the United States. The initial move scattered the followers and reduced Rapp's original group of 12,000 to many fewer persons.

In 1804, Rapp was able to secure a large tract of land in Pennsylvania and started his first commune. This first commune, 'Harmonie', (Harmony), Butler County, Pennsylvania, soon grew to a population of about 800, and was highly profitable. At Harmony, the Harmony Society was created and its members contracted to hold all property in common, to submit to spiritual and material leadership by Rapp and associates, and adopted the celibate lifestyle. In 1814, the first town was sold to Mennonites for 10 times the amount originally paid for the land, and the entire commune moved out west to Indiana where their new town was also known as Harmony. Ten years after the move to Indiana the commune moved again, this time it returned to Pennsylvania and named their town 'Ökonomie', Economy. The Indiana settlement was sold to Robert Owen, at which point it was renamed New Harmony, Indiana.

George Rapp lived out his remaining days in the town of Economy, Pennsylvania, until August 7, 1847, when he died at the age of 89. The commune ultimately failed because the policy of celibacy prevented new members from within, and the majority of the outside world had no desire to give up so much to live in a commune. The society was formally dissolved in 1906.

Today, many of their remaining buildings are preserved and open to visitors. The entire village was designated as a National Historic Landmark District in 1965.

== See also ==
- Zoar, Ohio another Christian theosophist founded village

== Bibliography ==
- Account of the Harmony Society and its beliefs
- Picture Gallery
- "Old Economy Historical Site, USGS Ambridge (PA) Topo Map". TopoQuest.
- Jane Ockershuasen. "Harmony in the Wilderness: A Walk Through Old Economy Village". Pennsylvania Heritage Magazine. Archived from the original on December 14, 2006.
- Aaron Williams, The Harmony Society at Economy, Pennsylvania, Founded by George Rapp, A.D. 1805 (Pittsburgh, 1876)
- Nordhoff, Communistic Societies of the United States (New York, 1874)
- Alfred Hinds, American Communities (revised edition, Chicago, 1902)
- Bole, The Harmony Society (Philadelphia, 1904)
- J. S. Duss, George Rapp and his Associates (Indianapolis, 1914)
- Daniel B. Reibel, and Art Becker, Old Economy Village : Pennsylvania trail of history guide (Mechanicsburg, PA, 2002)
