= Christoph Schütz =

German pietist writer and songbook publisher

Christoph Schütz (6 November 1689 in Umstadt, Germany – 4 January 1750 in Bad Homburg, Germany) was a pietist writer and a songbook publisher.

Schütz's book, Die Güldene Rose. . . von der Wiederbringung Aller Dinge (The Golden Rose . . . on the Restoration of All Things) influenced George Rapp and his Harmony Society so much at one point that they used the symbol of the rose and the Bible verse Micah 4:8 as the symbol of their communal society for a couple of years.
