= Lois T. Henderson =

American novelist

Lois T. Henderson is an American author of Christian novels, many of which are dramatizations of Biblical narratives about women.

== Selected publications ==
=== Fiction ===
- The Holy Experiment: a Novel About the Harmonist Society (1974) ISBN 0-682-48115-7
- Hagar: a Novel (1978). About the slave girl who bore Abraham's son. This work was a finalist for the Gold Medallion Book Award of the Evangelical Christian Publishers Association. ISBN 0-915684-29-2
- Lydia: a Novel (1979). About the seller of purple who was Paul's first Christian convert in Europe. ISBN 0-915684-32-2
- The Blessing Deer (1980). ISBN 0-89191-244-4
- Abigail: a Novel (1980). About the second wife of King David
- Ruth: a Novel (1981). About the woman from Moab who eventually became the wife of Boaz, a relative of King David. ISBN 0-915684-91-8
- A Candle in the Dark (1982). ISBN 0-89191-504-4
- Miriam: a Novel (1983). ISBN 0-06-063867-2
- Touch of the Golden Scepter (1983). ISBN 0-85421-995-1
- Her Contrary Heart (1984). ISBN 0-8423-1401-6
- Priscilla and Aquila: A Novel [with Harold Ivan Smith] (1985). ISBN 0-06-063868-0

=== Nonfiction ===
- The Opening Doors: My Child's First Eight Years Without Sight (1954).
- Do You Believe in Miracles (1965).
- Another Way of Seeing (1982). ISBN 0-915684-99-3

=== Translated into German ===
- Die Purpur-Händlerin von Philippi (Lydia) [Translator: KH Neumann (1985)] ISBN 3-87482-120-X Leuchter Verlag eG - D-6106 Erzhausen
- Von Moab nach Bethlehem (Ruth) [Bestell Nr. 20 097 vom Leuchter Verlag eG]
