= Das Kloster =

Das Kloster ("The Cloister"; full title Das Kloster. Weltlich und geistlich. Meist aus der ältern deutschen Volks-, Wunder-, Curiositäten-, und vorzugsweise komischen Literatur "The Cloister. Profane and sacred. Mostly from older German Popular, Miraculous, Curious and especially Comical Literature") is a collection of magical and occult texts, chapbooks, folklore, popular superstition and fairy tales of the German Renaissance compiled by Stuttgart antiquarian Johann Scheible in 12 volumes, 1845-1849. Vols. 3, 5 and 11 are dedicated to the Faust legend. Vols. 7, 9 and 12 dealing with topics of folklore and ethnography were written by F. Nork (pseudonym of Friedrich Korn, 1803–1850).

- vol. 1 (1845), 840 pp, ch. 1-4 Volksprediger, Moralisten und frommer Unsinn
- vol. 2 (1846), 1074 pp, ch. 5-8, Doctor Johann Faust
- vol. 3 (1846), 1065 pp, ch. 9-12, Christoph Wagner, Don Juan Tenorio und verschiedene Schwarzkünstler und Beschwörer
  - 9. Christoph Wagner
  - 10. incantation and oracle
  - 11. Don Juan Tenorio of Sevilla
  - 12. pacts with the devil, various nigromancers
- vol. 4 (1846), 840 pp, Der Theuerdank by Thomas Murner
- vol. 5 (1847), 1160 pp, Die Sage vom Faust bis zum Erscheinen des ersten Volksbuches, mit Literatur und Vergleichung aller folgenden
- vol. 6 (1847), 1106 pp, ch. 21-24 Die gute alte Zeit, after the manuscript collection of Wilhelm von Reinöhl
- vol. 7 (1847), 1120 pp, F. Nork, Der Festkalender, enthaltend die Sinndeute der Monatszeichen, die Entstehungs- und Umbildungsgeschichte von Naturfesten in Kirchenfeste (on the liturgical year and its evolution out of pagan festivals)
- vol. 8 (1847) 1122pp, Johann Fischart's Geschichtsklitterung und aller Praktik Grossmutter
- vol. 9 (1848), 1078 pp, ch. 33-36, F. Nork, Mythologie der Volksfragen und Volksmärchen
- vol. 10 (1848) 1184 pp, ch. 37-40, Johann Fischart's Flöhhatz, Weibertratz, Ehezuchtbüchlein, podagrammisch Trostbüchlein etc.
  - 37.-38. Thomas Murner
  - 39.-40. Johann Fischart
- vol. 11 (1849), 1222 pp, Die Geschichte vom Faust in Reimen etc.
- vol. 12 (1849), 1188 pp, F. Nork, Die Sitten und Gebräuche der Deutschen und ihrer Nachbarvölker etc.

Scheible also edited the Bibliotheca magica (1873–1874).

== See also ==
- Renaissance magic
- German folklore
