= Georg von Welling =

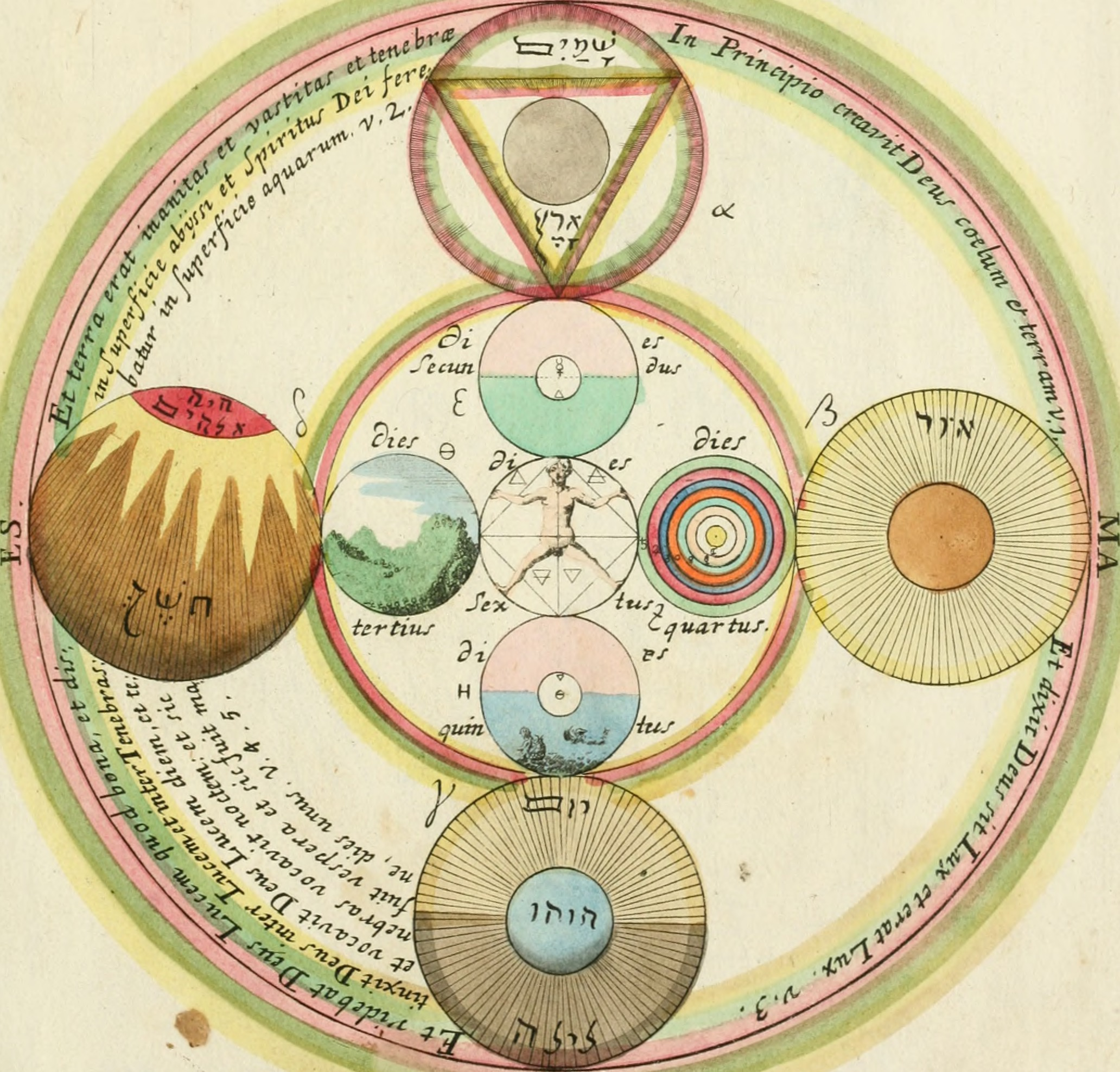
Opus mago-cabalisticum et theologicum, by Georg von Welling

Georg von Welling (1655–1727) born, 1655, in Kassel in Hesse, was a German alchemical and theosophical writer, known for his work Opus mago-cabalisticum, first published incomplete under the pseudonym Gregorius Anglus Sallwigt in 1719. By profession he worked in the mining industry, becoming Director in the Baden-Durlacher Office of Building and Mines. He lost his position in 1723, and retired to Bockenheim near Frankfurt, where he died in 1727. The first complete publication of his major work, Opus Mago-cabbalisticum et theosophicum, was printed in 1735 8 years after his death.

== Works ==
- Herrn Georgii von Welling opus mago-cabbalisticum et theosophicum : darinnen der Ursprung, Natur, Eigenschafften und Gebrauch des Saltzes, Schwefels und Mercurii in dreyen Theilen beschrieben ... wird ... . Deme noch beygefüget ein Tractätlein von der göttlichen Weißheit und ein besonderer Anhang etlicher ... chymischer Piecen . Helwig, Homburg vor der Höhe 1735 Digital edition by the University and State Library Düsseldorf. Contains 15 engraved plates. A second edition, a page for page reprint of the 1735 edition, was published at Franckfurt and Leipzig in 1760, and a third edition at Leipzig, 1784. The work has been described as 'obscure and practically unintelligible.'
