= Gottfried Arnold =

German Lutheran theologian and historian

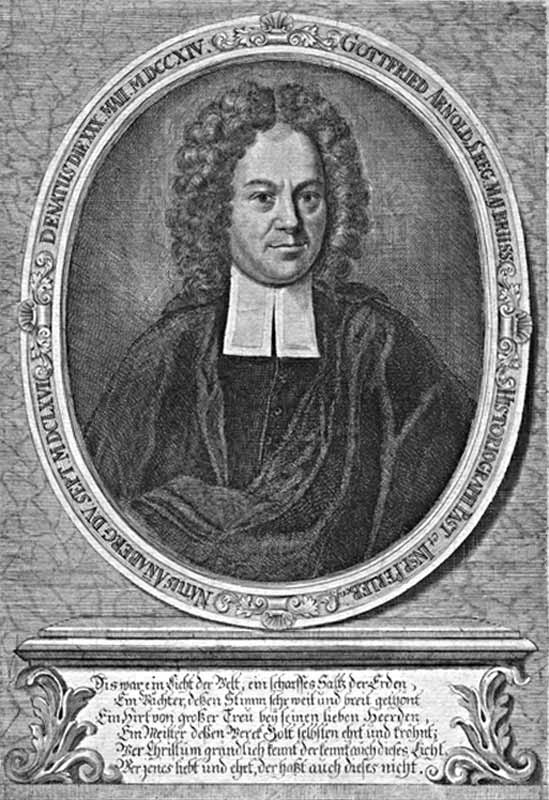
Engraved portrait of Gottfried Arnold

Gottfried Arnold (5 September 1666 – 30 May 1714) was a German Lutheran theologian and historian.

== Biography ==
Arnold was born at Annaberg in Saxony, Germany, where his father was schoolmaster. In 1682, he went to the Gymnasium at Gera and three years later to the University of Wittenberg. He made a special study of theology and history, and afterwards, through the influence of Philip Jacob Spener, the father of pietism, became tutor in Quedlinburg.

Arnold's first work, Die Erste Liebe zu Christo, appeared in 1696. It went through five editions before 1728 and gained him a high reputation. In the year after its publication, he was invited to Gießen as professor of church history. He disliked academic politics and academic life so much that he resigned in 1698, and returned to Wittenberg.

The next year, Arnold began to publish his largest work, his Kirchen- und Ketzer-Historie Unpartheyische ("Impartial History of the Church and of Heresy"), two volumes in which some thought he showed more sympathy towards heresy than towards any established Church, or especially the clergy (cf. Otto Pfleiderer, Development of Theology, p. 277). The book was described by Tolstoy (The Kingdom of God Is Within You, chap, III.) as "remarkable, although little known". A Dutch edition was published in 1701 by Sebastiaan Petzold, containing portraits of heretic figures, etched by Romeyn de Hooghe.

In this major revision of church history, Arnold directed his sharpest criticism against those who wrote deeply biased apologetic "orthodox" histories instead of trying to understand where substantial religious differences actually came from. In his view, "heresy making" was usually the defensive reaction of those in authority, rather than a true indictment of unconventional thinkers. He thought that the worst calamity in Church history was its establishment as the accepted and orthodox faith by the Roman Emperor Constantine in the fourth century. Arnold evinced a remarkable sympathy for a huge variety of "heretics." This "impartial history" exercised a wide influence on the German Enlightenment and won approval from such thinkers as Johann Wolfgang Goethe in addition to Leo Tolstoy.

His next work, Geheimniss der göttlichen Sophia, showed that he had developed a form of mysticism including a female image of wisdom (sophia) as a kind of divinity. Soon afterwards, however, his marriage and his acceptance of a pastorate marked a sharp change of views, and he produced a number of noteworthy works on practical theology. He was a thoroughly learned and prominent Pietist Lutheran, with a wide range of influence, and at least in his early career a radical Pietist, vehemently opposed to the unbending ecclesiastical structures of his time.

Arnold's sacred poems also made a substantial contribution to the treasury of hymns within the Lutheran church, and a poem of his was used by Johann Sebastian Bach ("Vergiss mein nicht", BWV 505).
