= Wiernsheim =

German municipality

- Municipality
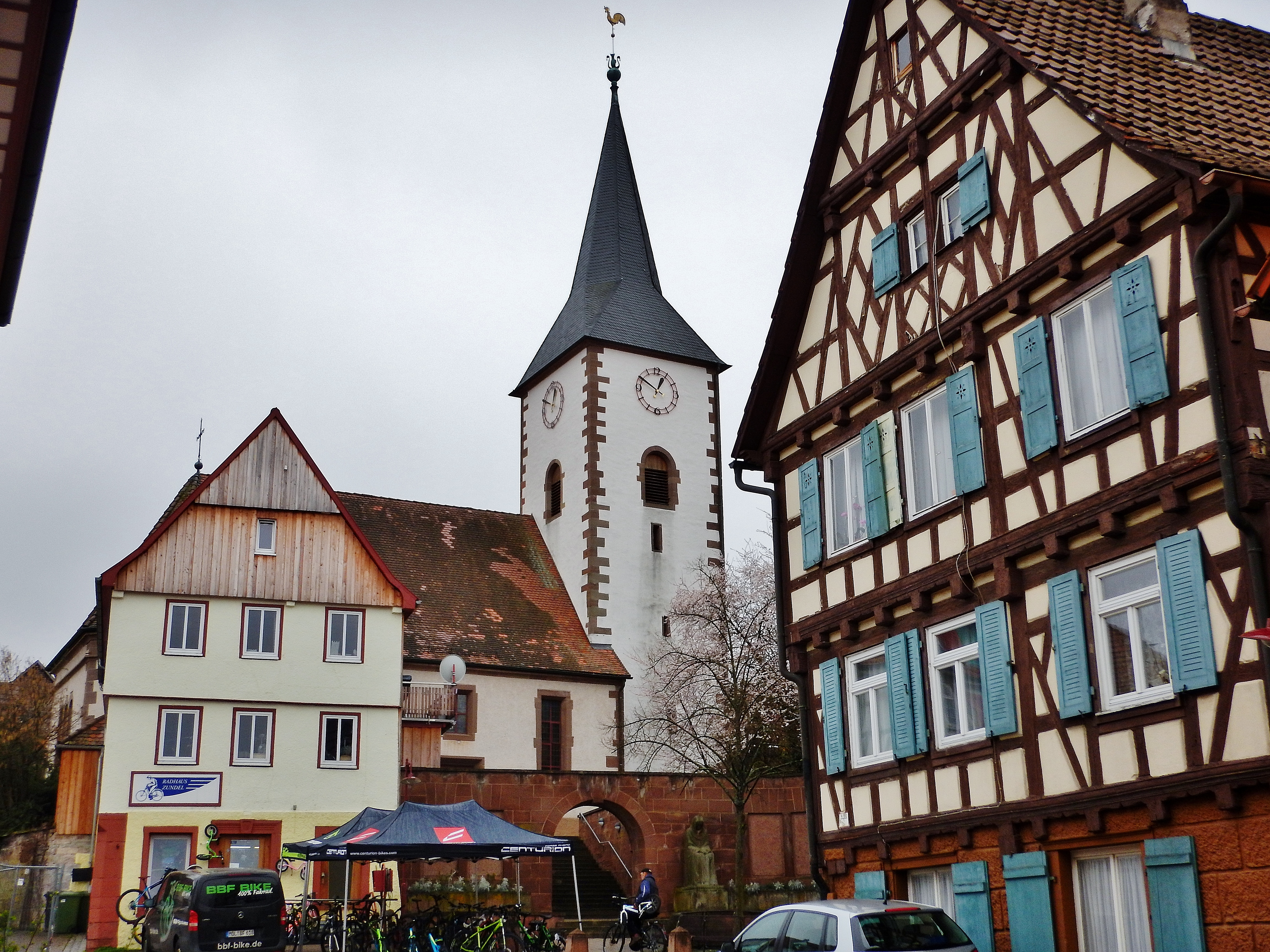
- Hindenburgstraße, with St. Maurice's Church, Wiernsheim visible

- Coat of arms

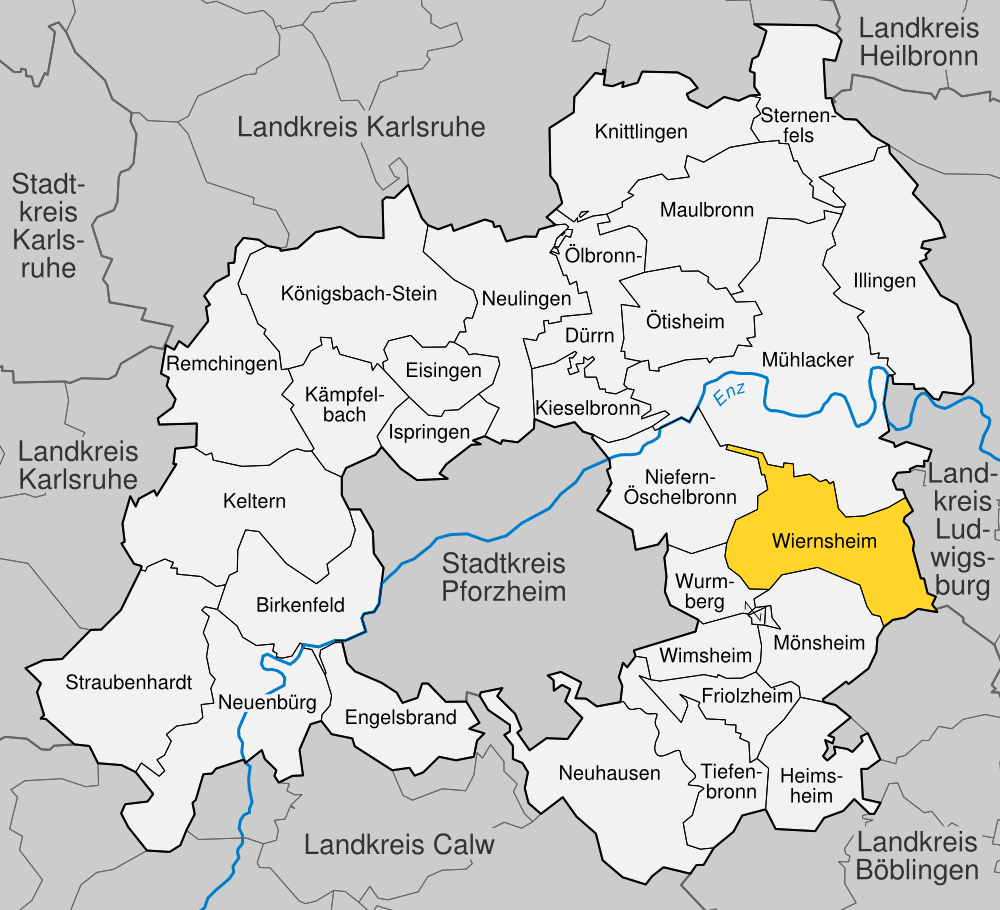
- Location of Wiernsheim within Enzkreis district
- Interactive map of Wiernsheim
- Location within Germany Location within Baden-Württemberg
- Coordinates: 48°53′24″N 8°51′2″E
- Country: Germany
- State: Baden-Württemberg
- Admin. region: Karlsruhe
- District: Enzkreis

Government
  - Mayor (2022–30): Matthias Enz (SPD)

Area
  - Total: 24.62 km^{2} (9.51 sq mi)
- Elevation: 366 m (1,201 ft)

Population (2025-12-31)
  - Total: 6,722
  - Density: 273.0/km^{2} (707.1/sq mi)
- Time zone: UTC+01:00 (CET)
  - Summer (DST): UTC+02:00 (CEST)
- Postal codes: 75446
- Dialling codes: 07044
- Vehicle registration: PF
- Website: www.wiernsheim.de

Wiernsheim (German pronunciation: [ˈviːɐ̯nshaɪm]) is a municipality in the Enz district of Baden-Württemberg, Germany.

== History ==
Wiernsheim became a possession of Maulbronn Monastery in 1259 and was governed by the monastery's district office until 1806. When Maulbronn became a possession of the Duchy of Württemberg in 1504, Wiernsheim and the village of Iptingen also became part of the Duchy. The villages of Pinache and Serres were founded in 1699 by Waldensians fleeing persecution in Piedmont. On 18 March 1806, the administrative district of Maulbronn was reorganized into an Oberamt, to which Wiernsheim and Iptingen were assigned. Iptingen was reassigned around 1842 to the jurisdiction of Vaihingen. It was joined on 1 October 1938 when the district of Maulbronn was dissolved and its constituents were assigned to the new Landkreis Vaihingen. On 1 January 1970, Wiernsheim incorporated Pinache. As part of 1973 Baden-Württemberg district reform, Wiernsheim, Iptingen, and Serres were assigned on 1 January 1973 to the newly created Enz district. The next year, Wiernsheim incorporated Iptingen and Serres.

== Geography ==
The municipality (Gemeinde) of Wiernsheim covers 24.62 kilometers (15.30 mi) of the Enzkreis, a district of the state of Baden-Württemberg and the Federal Republic of Germany. It is located in the metropolitan areas of Karlsruhe and Pforzheim, along the southwestern edge of the Neckar basin. Wiernsheim is physically in the Heckengäu, a region characterized by wooded and karstified hills of muschelkalk. Elevation above sea level in municipal area ranges from a low of 274 meters (899 ft) Normalnull (NN) on the Kreuzbach and a high of 464 meters (1,522 ft) NN in the southwest.

== Coat of arms ==
Wiernsheims' municipal coat of arms shows a golden crosier, wrapped in silver oak branches, upon a field of field framed on either side by five golden six-pointed stars. The crosier is a reference to Maulbronn, though the oak branches wrapped around it have no definite meaning. The stars were added around 1900 and are references to the Waldensian foundations at the villages of Pinache and Serres. The present pattern was devised in 1939 and its tincture in 1956. The Federal Ministry of the Interior approved both for official use by Wiernsheim on 12 December 1957.
