= Fox Run, Pennsylvania =

Fox Run, Pennsylvania, may refer to one of the following in the U.S. state of Pennsylvania:

- Fox Run, Berks County, Pennsylvania, a neighborhood of Muhlenberg Township, Berks County, Pennsylvania
- Fox Run, Butler County, Pennsylvania, a neighborhood and former census-designated place in Cranberry Township
- Fox Run, York County, Pennsylvania, a neighborhood of the city of York

== See also ==
- Fox Run (disambiguation)
