= Mars National Bank =

Bank based in Pennsylvania, US, 1900–2024

Mars Bank
- Company type: Public
- Founded: 1900
- Defunct: February 16, 2024
- Fate: Acquisition by NexTier Bank.
- Headquarters: Mars, Pennsylvania, U.S.
- Number of locations: 5 offices
- Area served: Pittsburgh area
- Services: Banking

Mars Bank was a bank located throughout the north Pittsburgh, Pennsylvania area. The headquarters of the bank was located in the borough of Mars. There were five branches located at various locations in lower Butler County, and upper Allegheny County.

- Butler County
  - Cranberry Office, Cranberry Township, Pennsylvania
  - Heritage Creek Office, Adams Township, Pennsylvania
  - Mars Office, Mars, Pennsylvania
  - Penn Office, Penn Township, Pennsylvania
- Allegheny County
  - Richland Office, Richland Township, Pennsylvania

On February 16, 2024, Mars Bank was merged into NexTier Bank.
