= Mars, Pennsylvania =

Borough in Pennsylvania, US

- Borough
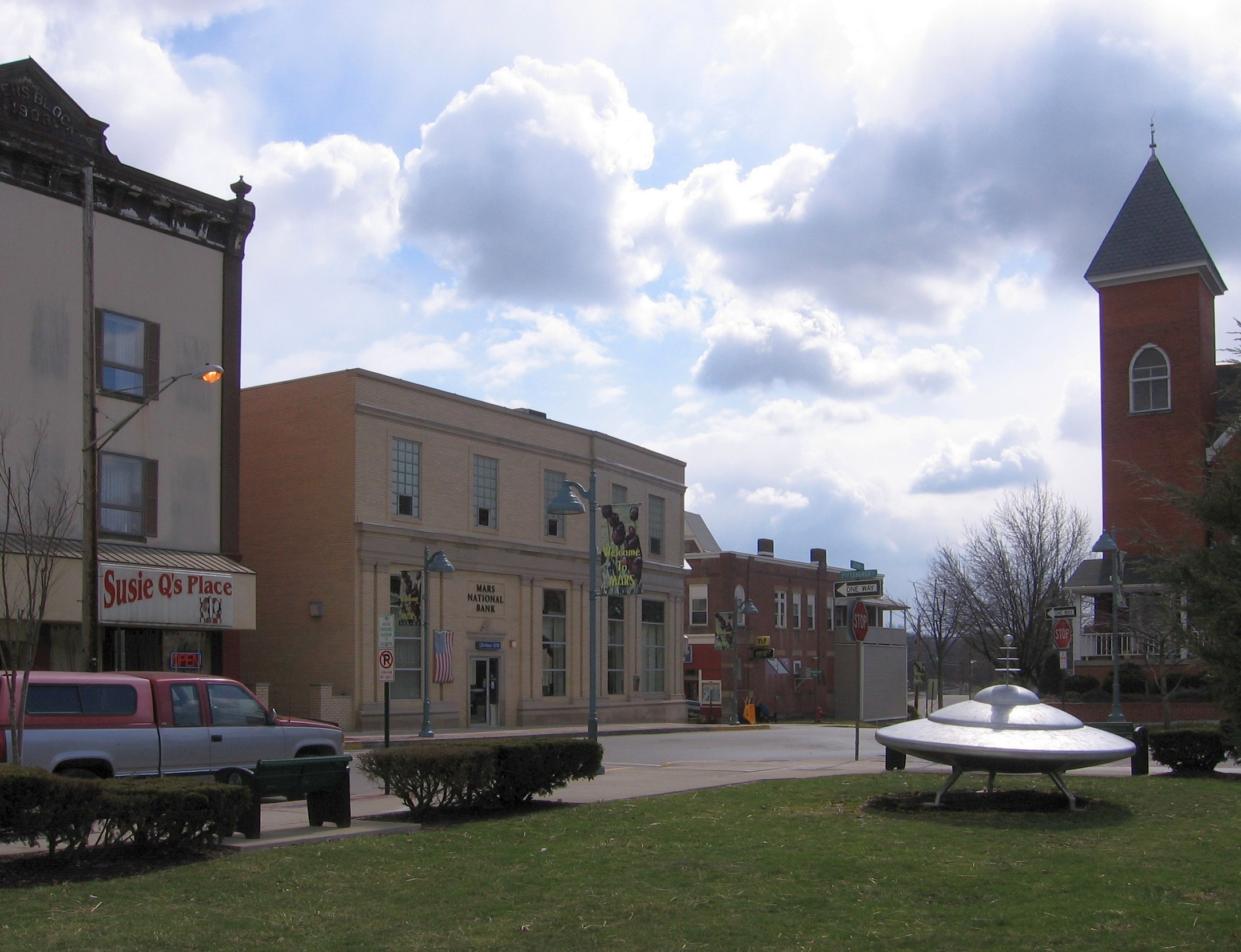
- Downtown Mars

- Location of Mars in Butler County, Pennsylvania.

- Location of Pennsylvania in the United States
- Coordinates: 40°41′48″N 80°0′44″W
- Country: United States
- State: Pennsylvania
- County: Butler
- Settled: 1873; 153 years ago
- Incorporated: 1882; 144 years ago

Area
  - Total: 0.47 sq mi (1.22 km^{2})
  - Land: 0.47 sq mi (1.22 km^{2})
  - Water: 0 sq mi (0.00 km^{2})

Population (2020)
  - Total: 1,458
  - Density: 3,099.5/sq mi (1,196.74/km^{2})
- Time zone: UTC-5 (EST)
  - Summer (DST): UTC-4 (EDT)
- ZIP code: 16046
- Area code: 724
- FIPS code: 42-47672
- School district: Mars Area School District
- Website: https://marsborough.com/

Mars is a borough in southern Butler County, Pennsylvania, United States. The population was 1,458 at the 2020 census. It is part of the Pittsburgh metropolitan area.

== History ==
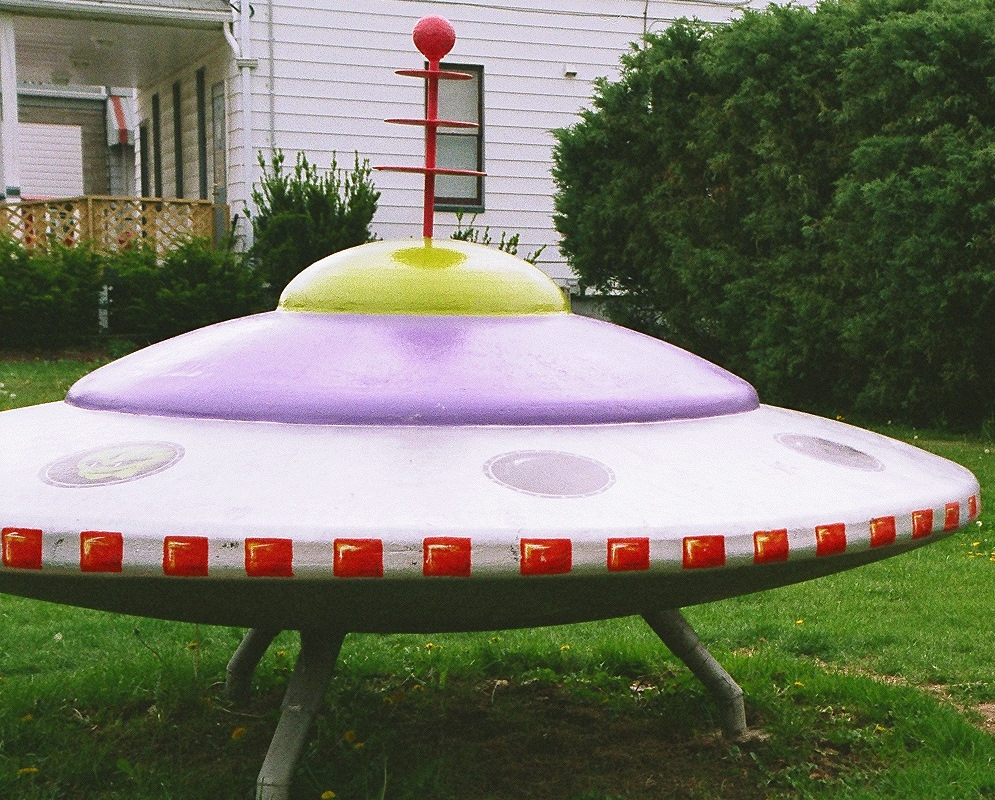
Spaceship statue in Mars

In 1873, Samuel Parks constructed a home and a water-powered gristmill along Breakneck Creek. Parks decided to have a post office placed in his home, so he received help from his friend Samuel Marshall to help establish it. The name of the post office became Overbrook. In 1877, the Pittsburgh, New Castle and Lake Erie Railroad was constructed through Overbrook, and had a station built there. In 1882, the name of the community was changed to Mars since the railroad already had a stop with the name "Overbrook". No one is sure how the name "Mars" came into being. Some say it was Parks's wife who enjoyed astronomy, while others believe it was shortened after Samuel Marshall's name. On March 6, 1895, Mars was incorporated as a borough.

In 1904, the Pittsburgh and Butler Street Railway gained permission from Mars to construct its right-of-way through the borough. The line become part of the Pittsburgh, Harmony, Butler and New Castle Railway in 1917, being renamed Pittsburgh, Mars and Butler Railway. The line closed in 1931.

The USS Mars (AFS-1) was named after the borough. The ship became part of the United States Pacific Fleet in 1963, and was decommissioned in 1998. It was then sunk in 2006 as a target vessel. The bell of the USS Mars was loaned to the borough and has become a part of a memorial in the downtown park.

== Geography ==
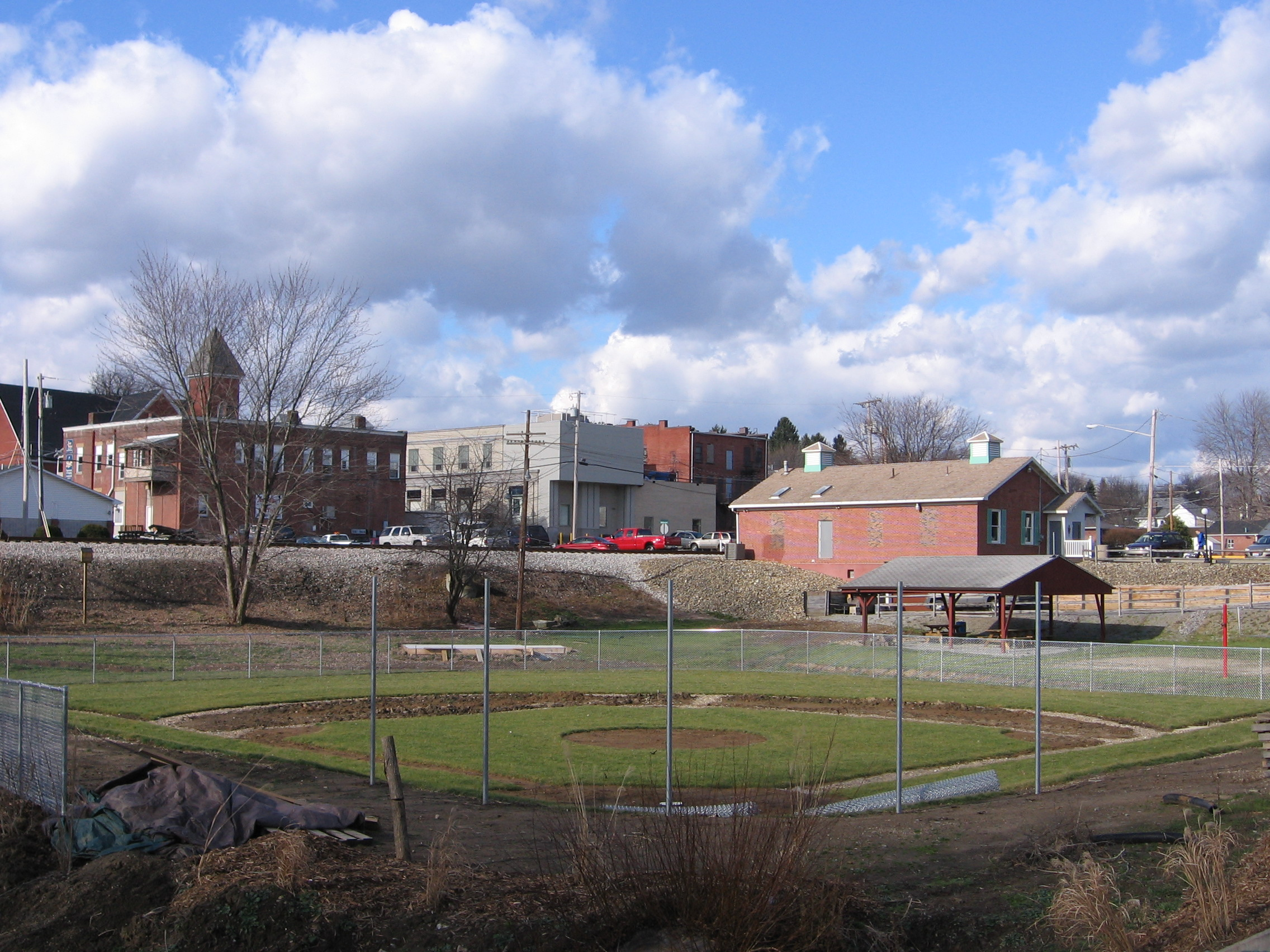
Mars seen from Clay Avenue

Mars is located in southern Butler County at 40°41′48″N 80°0′44″W (40.696594, −80.012205), about halfway between the cities of Pittsburgh and Butler. The small community is nestled in a small valley along Breakneck Creek. Pennsylvania Route 228 bypasses the borough to the south, leading east 4 miles (6 km) to Pennsylvania Route 8 and west 5 miles (8.0 km) to Interstates 79 and 76 in Cranberry Township. The Mars–Evans City Road leads out of town to the north.

According to the United States Census Bureau, the borough of Mars has a total area of 0.5 square miles (1.2 km^{2}), all land.

== Demographics ==
Historical population
Census	Pop.	Note	%±
1900	777		—
1910	1,215		56.4%
1920	1,226		0.9%
1930	1,302		6.2%
1940	1,318		1.2%
1950	1,385		5.1%
1960	1,522		9.9%
1970	1,488		−2.2%
1980	1,803		21.2%
1990	1,713		−5.0%
2000	1,746		1.9%
2010	1,699		−2.7%
2020	1,458		−14.2%

As of the 2000 census, there were 1,746 people, 687 households, and 395 families residing in the borough. The population density was 3,906.5 inhabitants per square mile (1,508.3/km^{2}). There were 715 housing units at an average density of 1,599.7 per square mile (617.6/km^{2}). The racial makeup of the borough was 98.68% White, 0.46% African American, 0.06% Native American, 0.40% Asian, 0.06% Pacific Islander, 0.11% from other races, and 0.23% from two or more races. Hispanic or Latino of any race were 0.40% of the population.

There were 687 households, out of which 25.0% had children under the age of 18 living with them, 45.7% were married couples living together, 10.8% had a female householder with no husband present, and 42.4% were non-families. 38.3% of all households were made up of individuals, and 24.3% had someone living alone who was 65 years of age or older. The average household size was 2.16 and the average family size was 2.89.

In the borough the population was spread out, with 18.6% under the age of 18, 5.7% from 18 to 24, 24.8% from 25 to 44, 17.8% from 45 to 64, and 33.2% who were 65 years of age or older. The median age was 46 years. For every 100 females, there were 70.0 males. For every 100 females age 18 and over, there were 64.2 males.

The median income for a household in the borough was $33,073, and the median income for a family was $46,136. Males had a median income of $34,083 versus $26,080 for females. The per capita income for the borough was $17,701. About 7.8% of families and 9.3% of the population were below the poverty line, including 11.8% of those under age 18 and 14.4% of those age 65 or over.

=== Religion ===
Mars has several Christian denominations located within and just outside the community. One of the largest churches was Saint Kilian Parish. Founded in 1917, the parish was originally located in downtown Mars, but by the early 2000s (decade), membership had swelled so much that a new facility was constructed just outside the neighboring Seven Fields borough along PA 228 in 2008. There is also a large presence of Presbyterians in the borough. The Mars United Presbyterian was founded in 1969 with the merging of two older churches, one under the United Presbyterian Church of North America, the other under the Presbyterian Church (USA). There is also a Lutheran and Methodist church located within the borough. The Woodland Valley Church is one of the newer churches in Mars, and is one of several contemporary churches that have recently started in the Mars/Cranberry area. Others include the Mars Alliance Church, and the Discovery Christian Church which will be built along PA 228 across from the former. The Serbian Orthodox Eparchy of Eastern America previously had its headquarters in Adams Township, near Mars.

== Economy ==
Mars National Bank, founded in 1900, has its headquarters located in the borough, with seven branches located in Butler and Allegheny counties.

== Culture ==
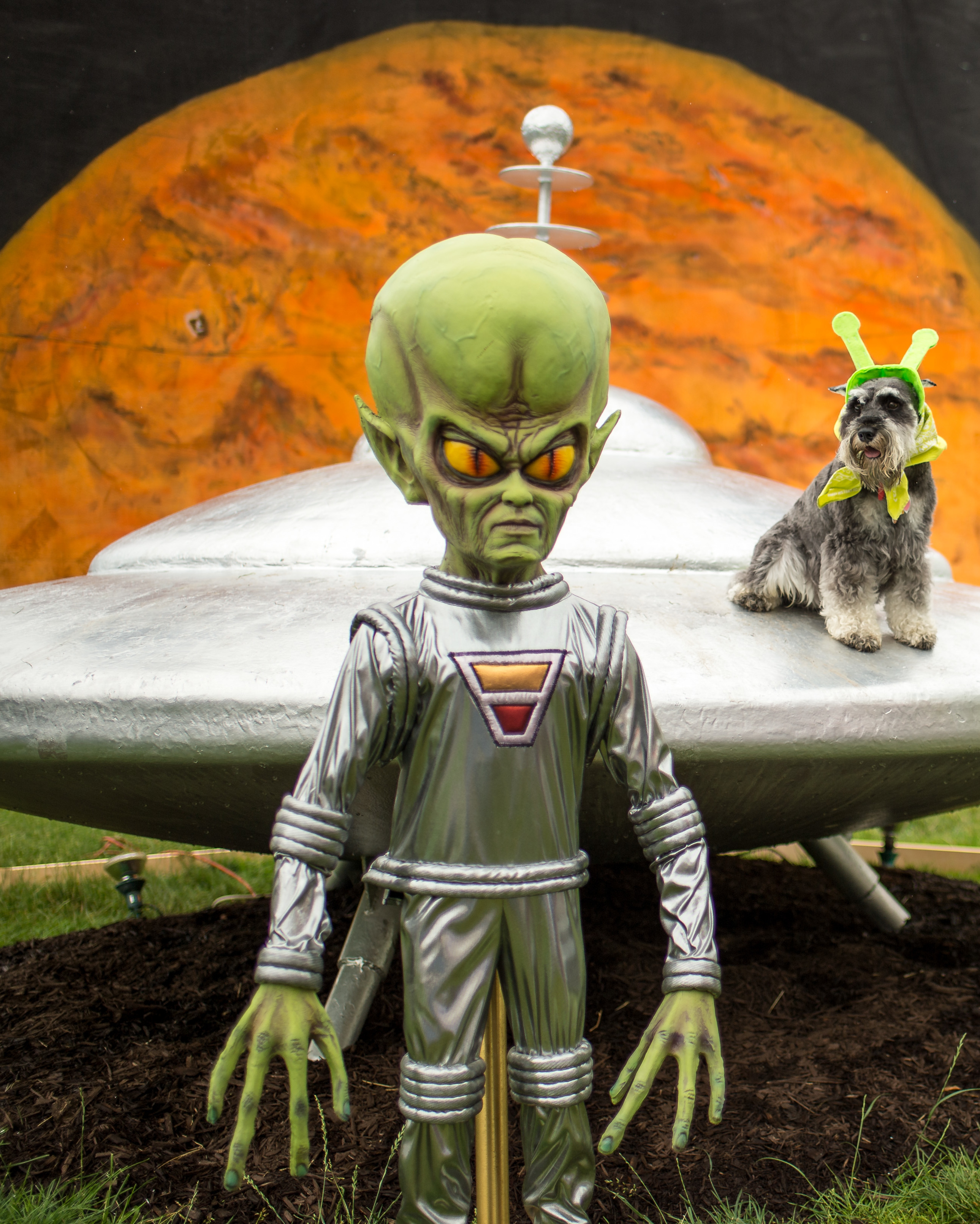
The Mars New Year's celebration takes place when the planet makes one revolution around the Sun

Because of its unique name, and proximity to Pittsburgh, Mars has on occasion received national media attention. In 2011, a representative from The Walt Disney Company invited students from Mars Elementary School to attend the Pittsburgh premiere of Mars Needs Moms, after reading a featured article on the town by msnbc.com. Mars was the only school nationwide invited to the film's premiere.

The borough has also been a location for films and television commercials. The 1988 comedy drama film The Prince of Pennsylvania and the 1996 comedy film Kingpin were filmed throughout the borough. In 2000, a Kraft salad dressing commercial was filmed in downtown.

Canadian musician John Southworth named his first album Mars, Pennsylvania after the town, which he had passed through many years earlier on a school trip.

Mars was the inspiration for the fictional town of Athena, Pennsylvania, the setting for the 2015 fictional trilogy, Benjamin's Field, by local author J. J. Knights.

Mars is home to the popular roadside attraction the Mars "Spaceship" or "Flying Saucer". It is also home to the Mars Station, one of the last railroad depots still standing from the now defunct Pittsburgh and Western Railroad.

== Education ==
The Mars Area School District serves the boroughs of Mars and Valencia, as well as Adams Township and Middlesex Township in Butler County. The Mars Fightin' Planets are one of the many teams located in the north Pittsburgh area.

== Transportation ==
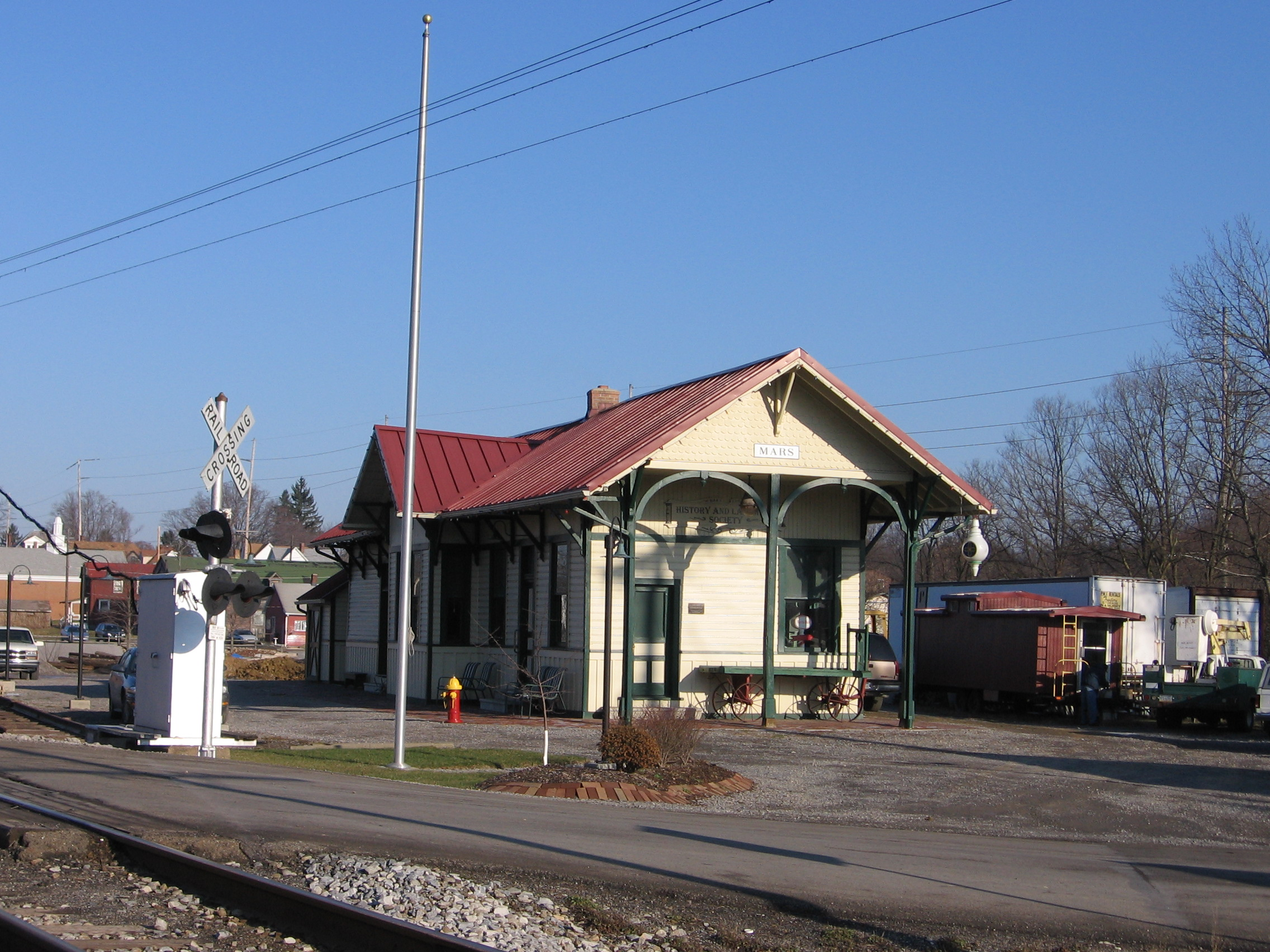
Mars Station, Pennsylvania

Lakehill Airport is a small closed airport, due to the expansion of Amherst Village. The next closest airports are the Butler County Airport and the Zelienople Municipal Airport.

The Buffalo and Pittsburgh Railroad operates on the P&W Subdivision in Mars. It makes occasional rounds to Austin's Bleach in Downieville and to a small transfer with the Allegheny Valley Railroad in Bakerstown. The AVR will also on occasion bring long loads of railcars through Mars to Harmony Junction in Eidenau. This usually occurs when there are too many cars to handle at the transfer point in Bakerstown.

The largest and busiest road in Mars is Pennsylvania Route 228. It is an important link for commuters because it connects with Pennsylvania Route 8 and Pennsylvania Route 356 to the east, and with Interstate 79 and U.S. Route 19 to the west. Commuters on PA 228 can easily reach Interstate 76 (Pennsylvania Turnpike) via I-79 or US 19 in Cranberry Township. The second busiest road in Mars is the Mars-Evans City Road, which was originally Pennsylvania Route 855. It is an important connecting road for Mars and the borough of Evans City. The Red Belt of the Allegheny County Belt System is located three miles south of Mars.

== Notable people ==
- William Eythe, film and stage actor and playwright of the 1940s
- Chloe and Christi Lukasiak, former stars on Dance Moms
- Robbie Sigurdsson, Icelandic ice hockey player and member of the Icelandic national team
- Jeff Wassmann, artist, writer and theorist
- David Bednar, MLB all-star pitcher
- Will Bednar, professional baseball pitcher
- JJ Wetherholt, professional baseball player

== Sources ==
- An Historical Gazetteer of Butler County, Pennsylvania, Mechling Bookbindery., 2006, ISBN 978-0-9760563-9-3.
