= Lakehill Airport =

- IATA: none; ICAO: none; FAA LID: P09

Summary
- Airport type: Public
- Owner: Private
- Serves: Mars, Pennsylvania
- Location: Adams Township, Pennsylvania
- Elevation AMSL: 1,030 ft (310 m)
- Coordinates: 40°42′25″N 080°01′49″W
- Interactive map of Lakehill Airport

Runways
Direction	Length		Surface
Direction	ft	m	Surface
5/23	2,850	869	Turf

Statistics (2008)
- Aircraft operations: 26,280
- Based aircraft: 11
- Source: Federal Aviation Administration

Lakehill Airport (FAA LID: P09), was a privately owned airport near Mars, Pennsylvania, U.S., part of the Pittsburgh metropolitan area. It was the smallest of the three airports located in Butler County. The remaining two are the Butler County Airport, and the Butler Farm Show Airport.

As of April, 2025, a housing plan is in Amherst Village, which is in the process of being built on the former airport property.

== See also ==
- List of airports in Pennsylvania
