= Save Our History =

Television series

Save Our History is a television program on the History Channel. It is a national history education and preservation program that raises awareness and support for preserving local and national heritage. It partnered with Preserve America, a White House initiative created by Laura Bush on March 3, 2003, to encourage the preservation of the United States' cultural heritage. The show is hosted by Edward Herrmann, and Save Our History: America's Most Endangered 1999 is hosted by Noah Wyle.

In 2006, Save Our History added the Teacher and Student of the Year Awards, given to those who help preserve historical sites in their communities. One of the sites included the first Union Army camp for African Americans in Cheltenham, Pennsylvania during the American Civil War. The other sites were the Mars Train Station in Mars, Pennsylvania and the Strand Theater in Zelienople, Pennsylvania.
