= Pennsylvania Route 228 =

State highway in Pennsylvania, United States

Pennsylvania Route 228

Route information
- Maintained by PennDOT
- Length: 21.1 mi (34.0 km)
- Existed: 1928–present

Major junctions
- West end: US 19 in Cranberry Township
- I-79 in Cranberry Township; PA 8 in Middlesex Township
- East end: PA 356 in Buffalo Township

Location
- Country: United States
- State: Pennsylvania
- Counties: Butler

Highway system
- Pennsylvania State Route System; Interstate; US; State; Scenic; Legislative
← PA 227	→ PA 229

Pennsylvania Route 228 (PA 228) is a 21.1-mile-long (34.0 km) state highway located in Butler County, Pennsylvania. The western terminus is at U.S. Route 19 (US 19) in Cranberry Township. The eastern terminus is at PA 356 in Buffalo Township. Because of the continued growth in Cranberry Township, Seven Fields, and Adams Township, PennDOT is in the planning stages to widen the highway to four lanes between Cranberry and PA 8.

== Route description ==
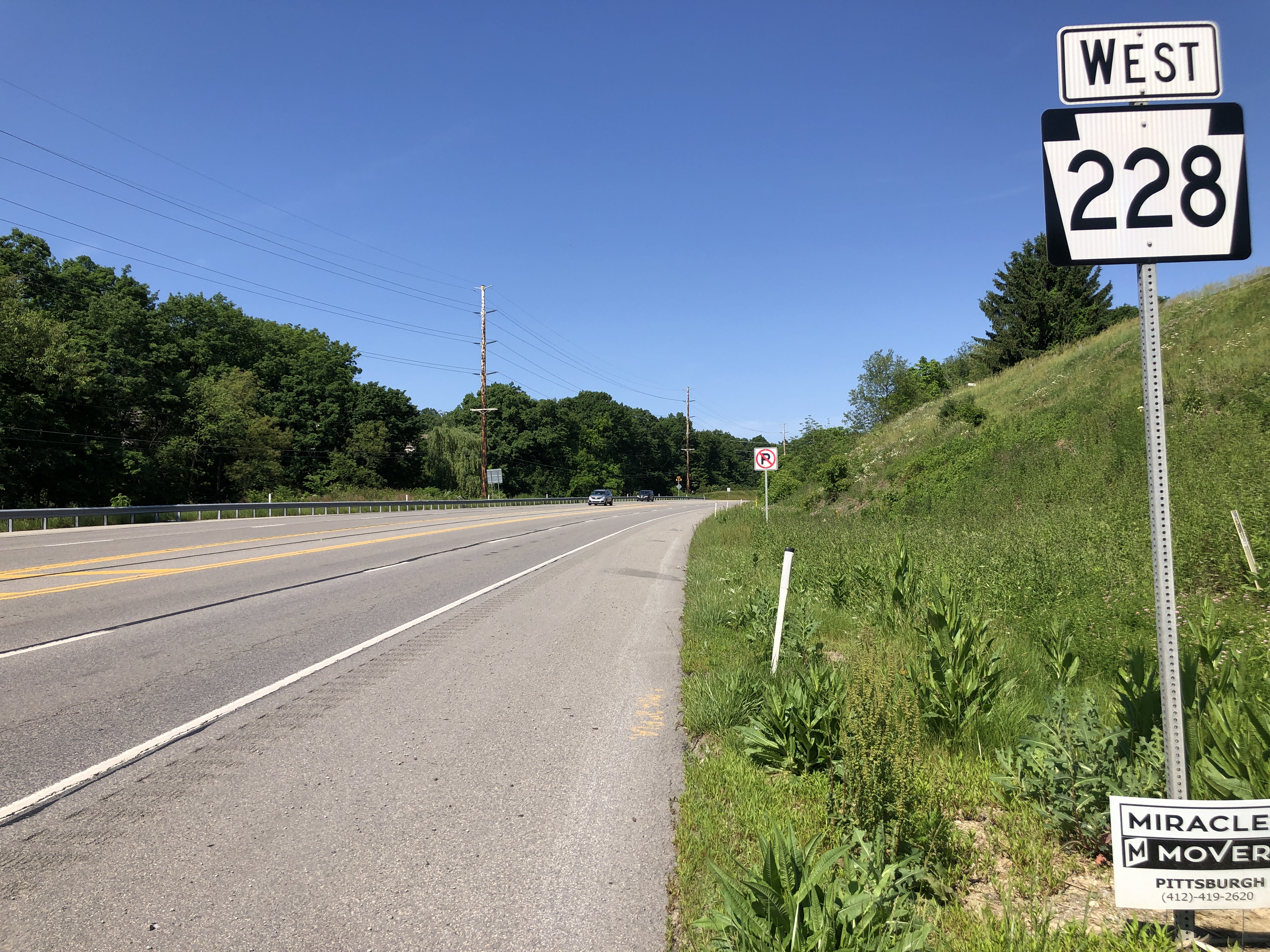
PA 228 westbound near Mars

PA 228 serves as the main thoroughfare across southern Butler County, due to the fact its western end in Cranberry Township connects to both U.S. Route 19 and Interstate 79. In addition to the southern Butler County traffic, the road also carries a large volume of northern Allegheny County traffic that is traveling locally to the numerous businesses along the road. In the south central portion of the county, PA 228 also connects to PA Route 8, a four-lane divided highway. Finally, PA 228 ends on the eastern side of Butler County at PA Route 356. This terminus is very close to PA Route 28, a limited access highway carrying traffic away from Pittsburgh to the northeast direction. All of these junctions, some major, some minor, contribute to the massive congestion on PA 228.

Starting at the western terminus with US Route 19, PA 228 is a four-lane, divided highway. As travelers head east past the I-79 interchange, both sides of the highway are highly developed. A wide-variety of restaurants are located on the south side of the highway, opposite a large strip mall on the north side of the highway.

After crossing the intersection with Franklin Road, drivers approach Seven Fields borough. The road narrows from 4 lanes to 2 lanes (One each direction). From this point on, PA 228 is 2 lanes for the duration of its route (the exception is when it runs concurrent with PA Route 8).

After leaving Seven Fields, drivers enter Adams Township. Although this stretch of roadway isn't highly developed like the neighboring Cranberry Township and Seven Fields portions are, traffic is still a problem. This is because local residents use this stretch of road to commute locally (to Cranberry) or to the city of Pittsburgh via I-79 or US Route 19. This large traffic volume issue is further compounded by the numerous side roads that are well traveled. Many of Rt. 228's intersections with side roads do not have turning lanes or traffic signals. Often drivers have to wait a considerable amount of time to turn onto a side roads because of heavy traffic volume during rush hour. This leads to backlogs in traffic since vehicles have to sit for long periods of time in the only travel lane waiting to turn, and other motorists cannot pass said stopped vehicle.

PA 228 bypasses the town of Mars.

Shortly after passing Mars Area Middle School, travelers enter Middlesex Township. Before arriving at the intersection with PA Route 8, drivers travel through an 'S' bend, locally known as "Balls Bend". This bend is notorious for accidents due to reckless driving and tractor trailers over turning. In January 2015, PennDOT announced a plan to realign and widen the road between PA 8 and Mars Area Centennial School. The new road will be almost perfectly straight, eliminating two sharp curves and will be widened to five lanes, two in each direction and a center turning lane. Construction is estimated for 2019. For 1.7 miles, PA 228 and PA 8 run concurrently (share the same road). After 1.7 miles, PA 228 heads east towards Saxonburg and Freeport, while PA 8 continues north toward Butler and eventually Erie.

While there is still some truck traffic (and now, rural farm traffic), traffic congestion on PA 228 is considerably less than it is west of the intersection with PA 8. Traffic traveling this portion of the road may be destined for PA Route 28 North (Kittanning, Indiana), the town of Freeport, or another location along the Allegheny-Kiski Valley.

== Major intersections ==
The entire route is in Butler County.

Location	mi	km	Destinations	Notes
Cranberry Township	0.0	0.0	US 19 (Perry Highway) – Warrendale, Zelienople	Western terminus of PA 228
Cranberry Township	0.3	0.48	I-79 to I-76 / Penna Turnpike – Pittsburgh, Erie	Exit 78 (I-79)
Middlesex Township	9.2	14.8	PA 8 south (Pittsburgh Road) – Pittsburgh	Western terminus of PA 8 concurrency
Middlesex Township	10.9	17.5	PA 8 north (Pittsburgh Road) – Butler	Eastern terminus of PA 8 concurrency
Buffalo Township	21.1	34.0	PA 356 (Pike Road) – Butler, Freeport	Eastern terminus of PA 228
1.000 mi = 1.609 km; 1.000 km = 0.621 mi: Concurrency terminus
