= Mars Area School District =

School district in Pennsylvania

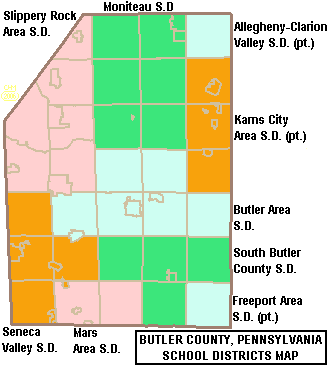

Address
- 545 Route 228 Mars, Butler County, Pennsylvania, 16046; United States
- Coordinates: 40.6936°N 79.9785°W

District information
- Type: Public

Students and staff
- Colors: Blue and Gold

Other information
- Website: www.marsk12.org

Mars Area School District is a public school district in Pennsylvania. The district encompasses approximately 46 square miles (120 km^{2}) and serves the communities of Mars and Valencia Boroughs as well as Adams Township and Middlesex Township in Butler County.

The earliest known school in the district was the Denny School, opened in 1796 in Middlesex Township. The current configuration of the district was formed in 1960 when the Mars and Valencia Boroughs combined with Adams and Middlesex Townships to form the Mars Area School District.

The Mars Area School District consists of five schools. The Mars Area Primary Center for students in Kindergarten through 1st grade, the Mars Area Elementary School for students in 2nd through 4th grade, the Mars Area Centennial School for students in 5th through 6th grade, the Mars Area Middle School for students in 7th through 8th grade, and the Mars Area High School for students in 9th through 12th grade.

== Extracurriculars ==
The district offers a wide variety of clubs, activities and a sports program. The Mars sports teams are called the Fightin' Planets with the school colors being navy and gold.
