= Pittsburgh and Butler Street Railway =

Overview
- Headquarters: Pittsburgh, Pennsylvania
- Locale: Western Pennsylvania: Pennsylvania; Pittsburgh; Butler; Mars
- Dates of operation: 1907–1917
- Successor: Pittsburgh, Mars and Butler Railway

Technical
- Track gauge: Pennsylvania Trolley Gauge, 5 ft 2 1/2 in (1,588 mm)
- Electrification: Overhead line, 6,600 V AC (until 1914); Overhead line, 1,200 V DC

The Pittsburgh and Butler Street Railway, commonly called the Butler Short Line, was a broad gauge interurban streetcar line connecting Pittsburgh, Pennsylvania, United States to Butler via Mars.

== History ==
The Pittsburgh and Butler Street Railway was opened in 1907 between Pittsburgh and Butler traveling via Etna, Glenshaw, Allison Park, and Mars. It initially used a 6,600 volt single phase alternating current electrical system. In 1914 the railway converted from AC to 1,200 volt DC which reduced power consumption by 15% and reduced the weight of each car by 6 tons.

In 1917 the railway amalgamated with the Pittsburgh, Harmony, Butler and New Castle Railway, who operated the Harmony Line between Pittsburgh and New Castle, the new company being named the Pittsburgh, Mars and Butler Railway.

In April 1931 the company went into receivership. The Butler Short Line was closed on April 22, 1931 as it was in poor condition, services being absorbed into the existing PA 8 bus service. The stub of the Butler Short Line continued to be used by Pittsburgh Railways as the 2 Etna service until closure in 1952.

== Route ==
Leaving Butler going south along South Chestnut Street the railway crossed the rails of the Baltimore and Ohio Railroad (B&O) and the Bessemer and Lake Erie Railroad (B&LE), before turning west down the valley of the Connoquenessing Creek through Bredinville. Running parallel to the B&LE through Odell and then east into Thorn Creek past Renfrew Station, the line then headed south, climbing out of Thorn Creek valley alongside Three Degree Road, where the Butler Country Club had a stop of their own. When Butler County Airport was constructed Three Degree Road was diverted to use the old track bed, now forming the eastern perimeter road of the airport.

The line continued south, descending into the valley of Breakneck Creek and passing through Mars. It continued south along the valley, through Downieville and Valencia to Etna, where it joined the local Pittsburgh Railways route to downtown.

== Incidents ==
Two cars collided on March 27, 1909 after one was delayed by a derailment on the grade crossing of the Baltimore and Ohio Railroad near Mars. The crash occurred near Bryant Station and three people died at the scene, all employees of the railway.
