= Adams Township, Butler County, Pennsylvania =

Township in Pennsylvania, US

Coordinates: 40°42′31″N 80°00′35″W

- Township
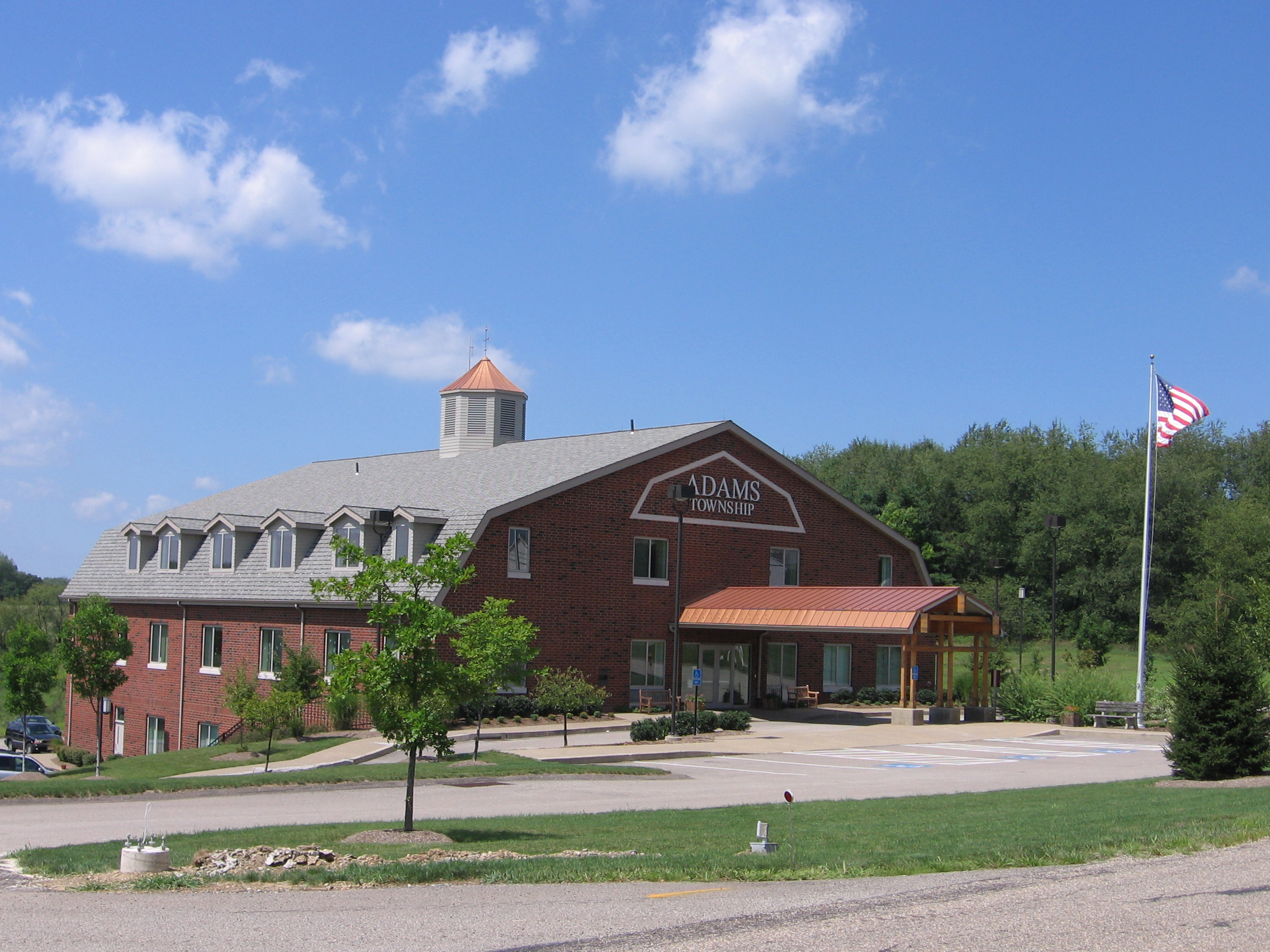
- Adams Township Municipal Building

- Logo

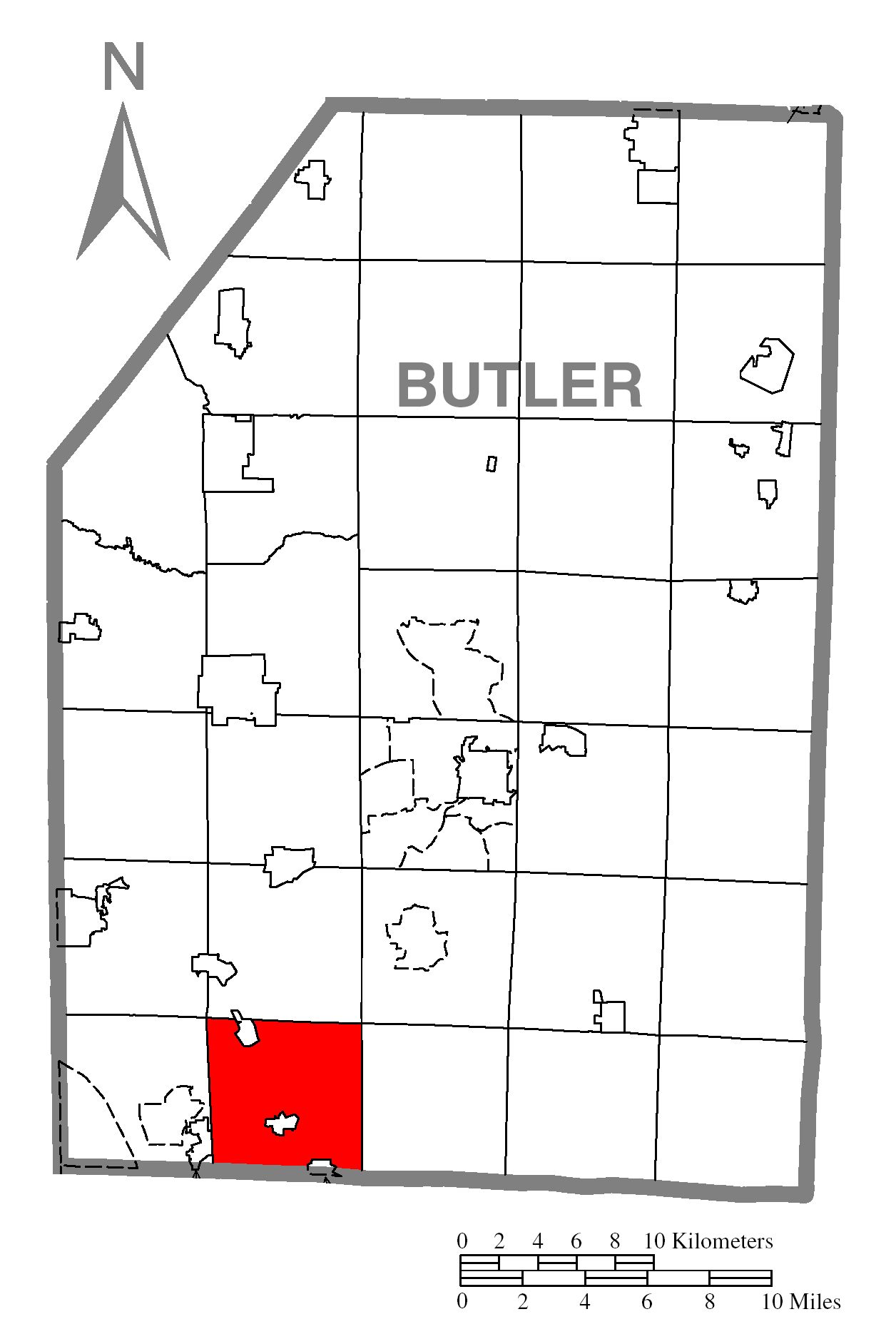
- Location of Adams Township in Butler County

- Location of Butler County in Pennsylvania
- Country: United States
- State: Pennsylvania
- County: Butler County
- Settled: 1796
- Incorporated: 1854

Area
  - Total: 22.42 sq mi (58.07 km^{2})
  - Land: 22.40 sq mi (58.02 km^{2})
  - Water: 0.019 sq mi (0.05 km^{2})

Population (2020)
  - Total: 14,481
  - Estimate (2022): 15,337
  - Density: 604.7/sq mi (233.47/km^{2})
- Time zone: UTC-5 (EST)
  - Summer (DST): UTC-4 (EDT)
- Area code: 724
- FIPS code: 42-019-00300
- Website: www.adamstwp.org

Adams Township in Butler County, Pennsylvania, United States, is a township that had population of 14,841 at the 2020 census.

== Geography ==
Adams Township is located along the southern edge of Butler County. It is bordered to the west by Cranberry Township and the borough of Seven Fields, at its northwestern corner by Jackson Township, to the north by Forward Township and the borough of Callery, at its northeastern corner by Penn Township, to the east by Middlesex Township, and to the south by the borough of Valencia, and, in Allegheny County, by Richland and Pine townships. The borough of Mars is completely surrounded by Adams Township but is a separate entity.

The busiest roads in the township include PA 228, and the Mars-Evans City Road.

According to the United States Census Bureau, Adams Township has a total area of 22.4 square miles (58.1 km^{2}), of which 0.019 square miles (0.05 km^{2}), or 0.08%, is water.

== Demographics ==
Historical population
Census	Pop.	Note	%±
1970	3,352		—
1980	3,816		13.8%
1990	3,911		2.5%
2000	6,774		73.2%
2010	11,652		72.0%
2020	14,844		27.4%
2022 (est.)	15,337		3.3%
U.S. Decennial Census

As of the 2000 census, there were 6,774 people, 2,382 households, and 1,917 families residing in the township. The population density was 299.3 inhabitants per square mile (115.6/km^{2}). There were 2,544 housing units at an average density of 112.4 per square mile (43.4/km^{2}). The racial makeup of the township was 97.1% White, 0.8% African American, 0.9% Asian, and 0.4% from two or more races. Hispanic or Latino of any race were 0.8% of the population.

There were 2,382 households, out of which 41.5% had children under the age of 18 living with them, 72.0% were married couples living together, 6.0% had a female householder with no husband present, and 19.5% were non-families. 16.1% of all households were made up of individuals, and 4.9% had someone living alone who was 65 years of age or older. The average household size was 2.80 and the average family size was 3.17.

In the township the population was spread out, with 29.9% under the age of 18, 4.8% from 18 to 24, 33.9% from 25 to 44, 23.0% from 45 to 64, and 8.4% who were 65 years of age or older. The median age was 36 years. For every 100 females, there were 96.8 males. For every 100 females age 18 and over, there were 98.2 males.

The median income for a household in the township was $65,357, and the median income for a family was $81,340. Males had a median income of $58,906 versus $38,796 for females. The per capita income for the township was $39,204. About 2.4% of families and 3.5% of the population were below the poverty line, including 1.3% of those under age 18 and 5.4% of those age 65 or over.

== History ==
Adams Township was settled in 1796 and incorporated when it separated from Cranberry and Middlesex townships in 1854. It is named for President John Quincy Adams.

With the growing population in neighboring Cranberry Township, Adams has had a steady increase in the population of people over the years. After the 2010 census, it was discovered that Adams Township had the largest population increase of any township or borough in the county as well as one of the highest in Western Pennsylvania over the previous decade.

== Education ==
Adams Township is within the Mars Area School District. The district consists of Mars Area Primary Center, Mars Area Elementary School, Mars Area Centennial School, Mars Area Middle School, and Mars Area High School.

== Culture ==
The Serbian Orthodox Eparchy of Eastern America previously had its headquarters in the township.
