= Fox on the Run =

Fox on the Run may refer to:

- "Fox on the Run" (Sweet song), a 1975 song by Sweet
- "Fox on the Run" (Manfred Mann song), a 1968 song by Manfred Mann

== See also ==
- Fox Run (disambiguation)
