= Mars station (Pennsylvania) =

Mars
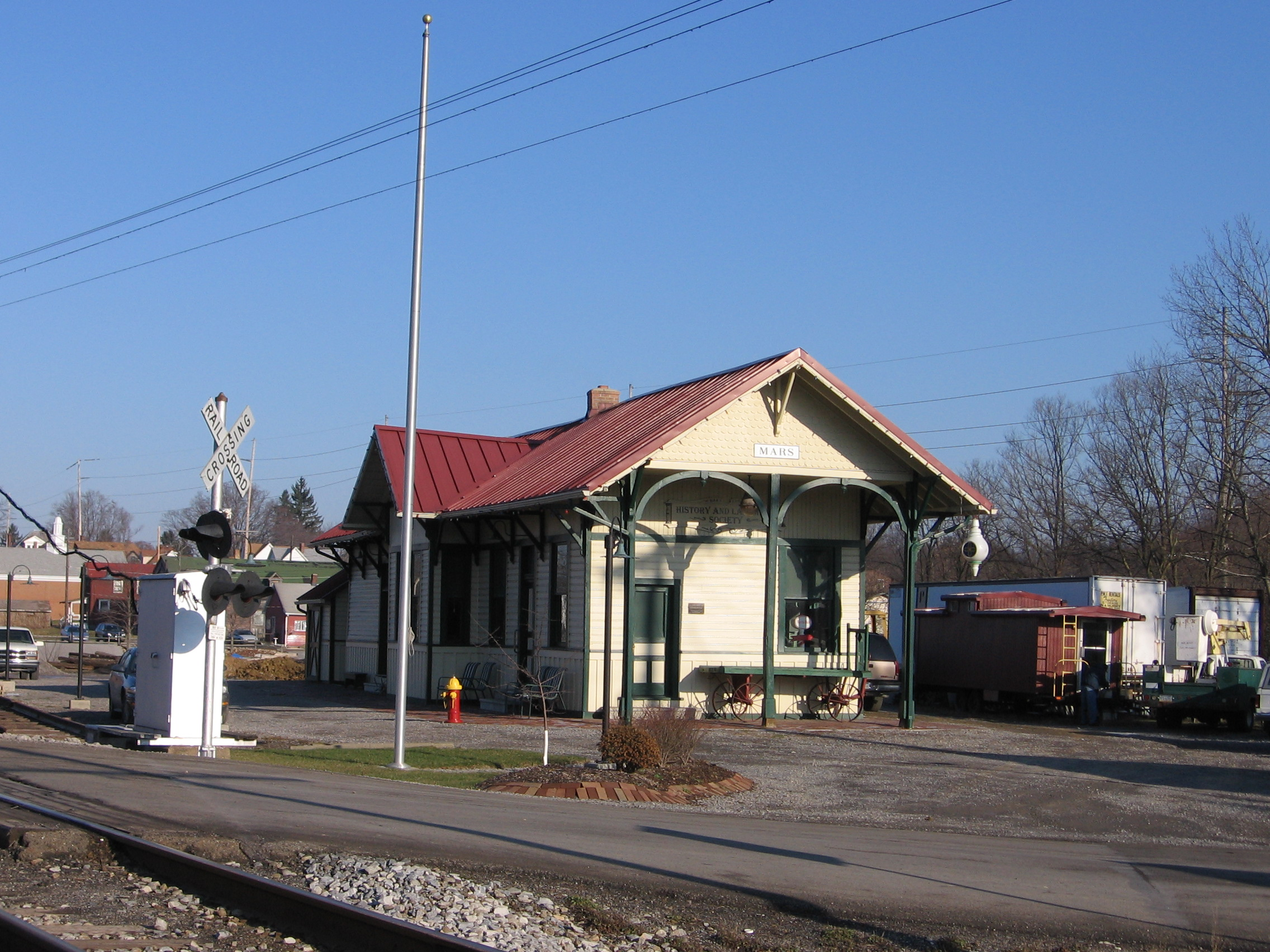

General information
- Location: Brickyard Road; Mars, PA 16046
- Owner: Mars Area History & Landmark Society
- Platforms: 1
- Tracks: 1

Construction
- Accessible: yes

History
- Opened: 1897
- Rebuilt: 2000–2007

Former services
Preceding station	Baltimore and Ohio Railroad	Following station
Youngstown toward Chicago	Main Line	Pittsburgh toward Jersey City
Callery toward Chicago	Main Line	Valencia toward Jersey City
Location

Mars station is a historic train station in Mars, Pennsylvania. It was constructed in 1897 by the Pittsburgh and Western Railroad. For nearly fifty years, the station served the community by helping to transport freight and passengers in the area. The station is located halfway between the cities of Pittsburgh, and Butler.

== History ==
The station was originally located at 40°41′45.2″N 80°00′33.5″W, near the intersection of Marshall Way and West Railroad Avenue. During the 1920s, a freight train derailed and crashed into the station, which knocked it off its foundation. The station would eventually be repaired. A few years later, residents gathered around the station and tracks to witness President Warren G. Harding's funeral train passing by on its way to Washington, D.C. The station closed down in the early 1960s, and it would sit vacant until the late 1970s. In the late 1970s and early 1980s the station was once again in use by the railroad and there was an agent located at the station. The agent that was at the station when it finally closed was J.T. Scott. After it closed again in the early 1980s it would remain closed.

Through many donations it was relocated and restored at its current site in the borough in August 1999, and in 2000, the Mars Historical Society purchased the station; it is now a museum. According to Railpace Newsmagazine, the Mars station is the last station still standing on the P&W Subdivision.

In 2006, the Mars Train Station was featured on The History Channel as part of the Save Our History program.
