= Richland Township, Allegheny County, Pennsylvania =

Township in Pennsylvania, US

Coordinates: 40°37′00″N 79°56′57″W

- Township
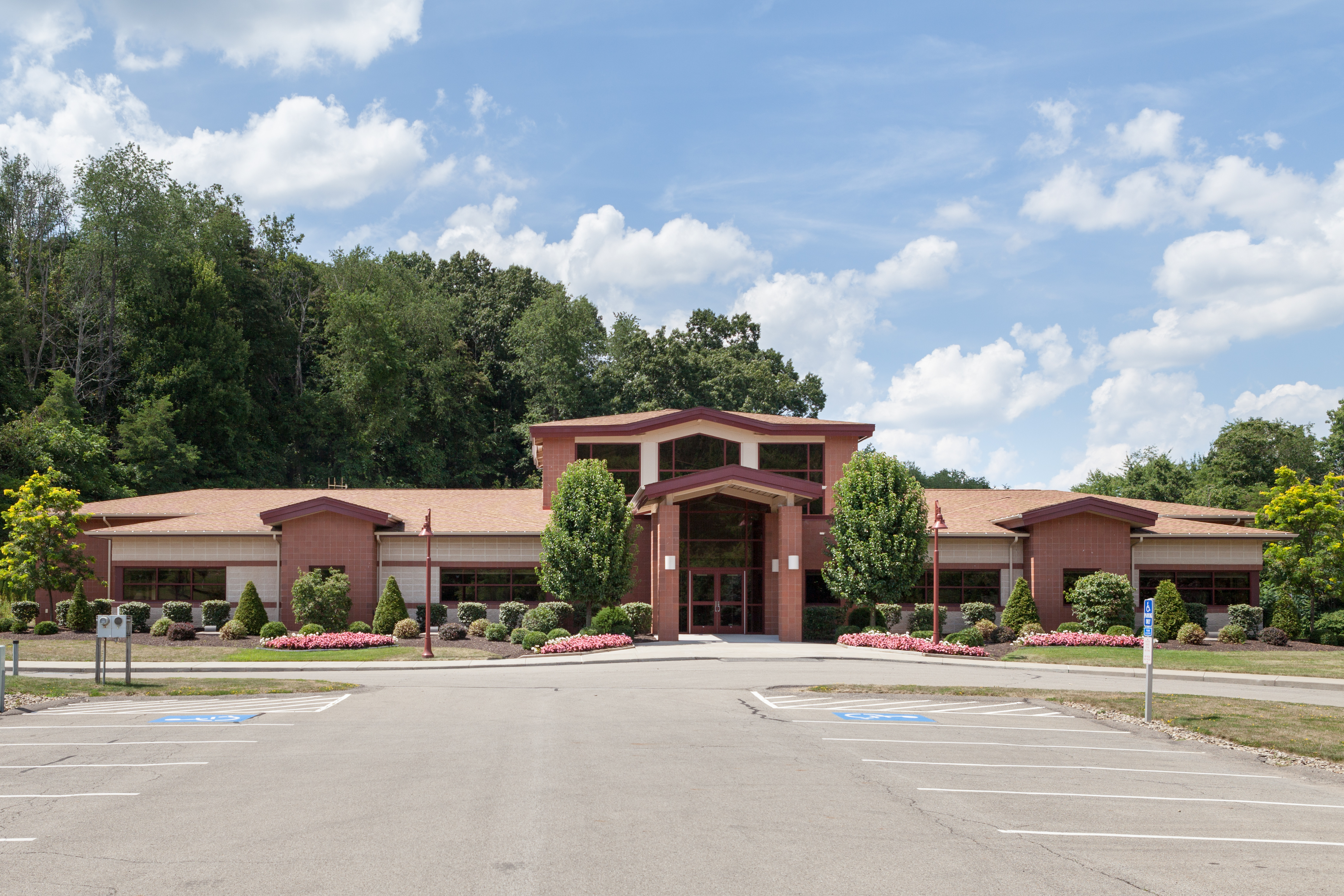
- Municipal Building at 4019 Dickey Rd, Gibsonia, PA

- Logo

- Location in Allegheny County and state of Pennsylvania
- Country: United States
- State: Pennsylvania
- County: Allegheny
- Incorporated: 1788

Government
  - Type: Council
  - Chairperson: Raymond Kendrick
  - Vice-Chairperson: George P. Allen

Area
  - Total: 14.63 sq mi (37.89 km^{2})
  - Land: 14.63 sq mi (37.89 km^{2})
  - Water: 0 sq mi (0.00 km^{2})

Population (2020)
  - Total: 11,942
  - Density: 787.1/sq mi (303.89/km^{2})
- Time zone: UTC-5 (Eastern (EST))
  - Summer (DST): UTC-4 (EDT)
- Area codes: 412, 724, 878
- FIPS code: 42-003-64528
- Website: Township website

Richland Township is a township in Allegheny County, Pennsylvania, United States. The population was 11,942 at the 2020 census.

The township was named for its fertile soil.

== Geography ==
According to the United States Census Bureau, the township has a total area of 14.6 square miles (37.7 km^{2}), all land. It contains the census-designated places of Bakerstown and Gibsonia.

== Surrounding neighborhoods ==
Richland Township has six borders, including the townships of West Deer to the east, Hampton to the south and Pine to the west. The other three borders are with Butler County neighborhoods: Valencia to the northwest, Adams Township to the north and Middlesex Township to the northeast.

== Demographics ==
Historical population
Census	Pop.	Note	%±
1870	707		—
1880	760		7.5%
1890	815		7.2%
1900	940		15.3%
1910	1,235		31.4%
1920	1,361		10.2%
1930	1,805		32.6%
1940	2,355		30.5%
1950	3,527		49.8%
1960	6,453		83.0%
1970	7,819		21.2%
1980	7,749		−0.9%
1990	8,600		11.0%
2000	9,231		7.3%
2010	11,100		20.2%
2020	11,942		7.6%

As of the 2000 census, there were 9,231 people, 3,353 households, and 2,491 families residing in the township. The population density was 634.3 inhabitants per square mile (244.9/km^{2}). There were 3,508 housing units at an average density of 241.0 per square mile (93.1/km^{2}). The racial makeup of the township was 98.31% White, 0.47% African American, 0.08% Native American, 0.57% Asian, 0.14% from other races, and 0.43% from two or more races. Hispanic or Latino of any race were 0.65% of the population.

There were 3,353 households, out of which 38.0% had children under the age of 18 living with them, 65.0% were married couples living together, 7.2% had a female householder with no husband present, and 25.7% were non-families. 23.1% of all households were made up of individuals, and 11.8% had someone living alone who was 65 years of age or older. The average household size was 2.67 and the average family size was 3.18.

In the township the population was spread out, with 27.8% under the age of 18, 4.6% from 18 to 24, 28.5% from 25 to 44, 23.7% from 45 to 64, and 15.5% who were 65 years of age or older. The median age was 40 years. For every 100 females there were 92.3 males. For every 100 females age 18 and over, there were 86.9 males.

The median income for a household in the township was $57,672, and the median income for a family was $67,471. Males had a median income of $50,699 versus $33,304 for females. The per capita income for the township was $25,085. About 4.0% of families and 5.0% of the population were below the poverty line, including 5.9% of those under age 18 and 5.4% of those age 65 or over.

== Government and politics ==
Richland Township is a 2nd Class Township and governs with a home rule charter. The Board of Supervisors is the governing body in the Township. Five Supervisors are elected by the qualified voters of the Township. Four supervisors are elected from each district and one supervisor is elected from the Township at large. The terms of all Supervisors are four years, commencing at 8:00 p.m. on the first Monday of January following the year in which they are elected, except that a Supervisor appointed to fill a vacancy shall serve only for the balance of the unexpired term.

=== Board of Supervisors ===
- [2017-2019] Republicans-5 (Kendrick, Allen, Marshall, B. Miller, Snyder), Democrats-0
- [2023-2025] Republicans-5 (Kendrick, Allen, Marshall, A. Miller, Snyder), Democrats-0
- [2025-2027] Republicans-5 (Kendrick, Allen, Marshall, A. Miller, Snyder), Democrats-0

=== Presidential elections ===
Presidential election results
Year	Republican	Democratic	Third parties
2020	56% 4,254	42% 3,222	1% 113
2016	52% 3,860	44% 2,565	4% 95

== Notable person ==
- Jackie Evancho – classical crossover singer.
- Janet de Coux - American sculptor
- Stephen Frick – American astronaut and a veteran of two Space Shuttle missions
- Meghan Klingenberg – American professional soccer player who most recently played in 2024 as a defender for the Portland Thorns in the National Women's Soccer League (NWSL) and former member of the United States women's national soccer team.
- Blake Lalli – American former professional baseball first baseman and catcher and current third base coach for the Miami Marlins of Major League Baseball (MLB)
- Brandon Saad – American professional ice hockey forward for the Vegas Golden Knights of the National Hockey League (NHL)
