= Seven Fields, Pennsylvania =

Borough in Pennsylvania, US

- Borough
- Borough of Seven Fields
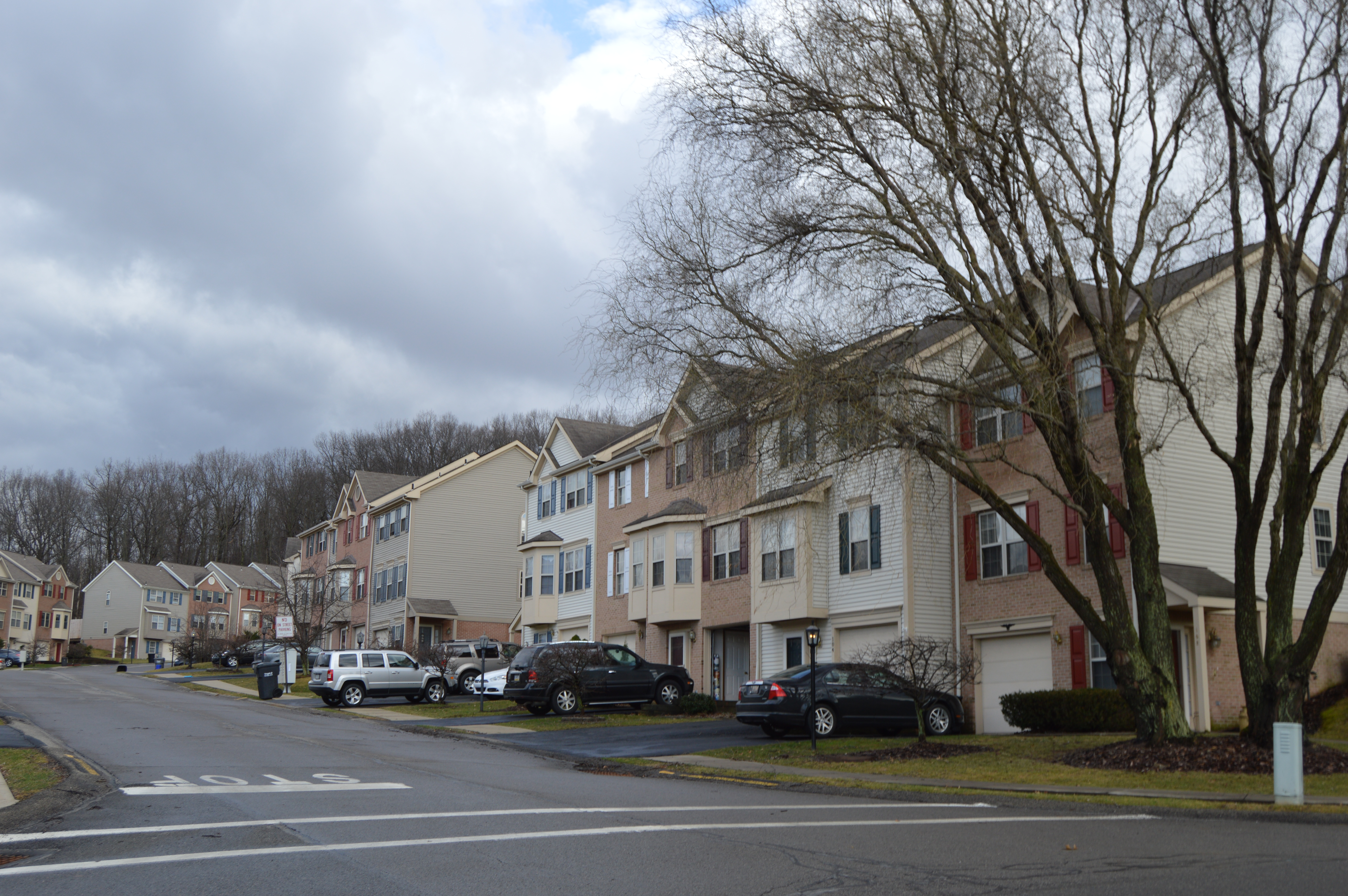
- Apartment houses on a typical borough street

- Location of Seven Fields in Butler County, Pennsylvania.

- Location of Pennsylvania in the United States
- Coordinates: 40°41′11″N 80°3′48″W
- Country: United States
- State: Pennsylvania
- County: Butler

Area
  - Total: 0.80 sq mi (2.08 km^{2})
  - Land: 0.80 sq mi (2.08 km^{2})
  - Water: 0 sq mi (0.00 km^{2})

Population (2010)
  - Total: 2,887
  - Estimate (2019): 2,736
  - Density: 3,400.2/sq mi (1,312.81/km^{2})
- Time zone: UTC-5 (EST)
  - Summer (DST): UTC-4 (EDT)
- Area code: 724
- FIPS code: 42-69309
- School district: Seneca Valley School District
- Website: www.sevenfields.org

Seven Fields is a borough in Butler County, Pennsylvania, United States. As of the 2020 census, Seven Fields had a population of 2,919.

== Geography ==
Seven Fields is located in southwestern Butler County at 40°41′11″N 80°3′48″W (40.686329, −80.063449). It is bordered on the north, west, and southeast by Cranberry Township and on the east by Adams Township. To the south is Pine Township in Allegheny County. The borough is part of a rapidly growing suburban area north of Pittsburgh.

Pennsylvania Route 228 (Mars Road) runs through the borough, leading east 3 miles (5 km) to the borough of Mars and west 2 miles (3 km) to Interstate 79, just north of its interchange with the Pennsylvania Turnpike.

According to the United States Census Bureau, Seven Fields has a total area of 0.81 square miles (2.1 km^{2}), all land.

== Demographics ==
Historical population
Census	Pop.	Note	%±
1990	556		—
2000	1,986		257.2%
2010	2,887		45.4%
2020	2,919		1.1%

As of the 2000 census, there were 1,986 people, 757 households, and 551 families residing in the borough. The population density was 2,374.8 people per square mile (916.9 people/km^{2}). There were 827 housing units at an average density of 988.9 per square mile (381.8/km^{2}). The racial makeup of the borough was 95.57% White, 0.70% African American, 2.77% Asian, 0.20% from other races, and 0.76% from two or more races. Hispanic or Latino of any race were 1.56% of the population.

There were 757 households, out of which 41.9% had children under the age of 18 living with them, 65.0% were married couples living together, 6.1% had a female householder with no husband present, and 27.2% were non-families. 21.8% of all households were made up of individuals, and 2.4% had someone living alone who was 65 years of age or older. The average household size was 2.57 and the average family size was 3.07.

In the borough the population was spread out, with 29.2% under the age of 18, 3.6% from 18 to 24, 45.9% from 25 to 44, 15.7% from 45 to 64, and 5.7% who were 65 years of age or older. The median age was 33 years. For every 100 females there were 93.2 males. For every 100 females age 18 and over, there were 89.5 males.

The median income for a household in the borough was $70,625, and the median income for a family was $76,646. Males had a median income of $60,395 versus $35,595 for females. The per capita income for the borough was $29,215. About 3.5% of families and 4.4% of the population were below the poverty line, including 5.0% of those under age 18 and 3.4% of those age 65 or over.

== Education ==
It is in the Seneca Valley School District.
