= Fox Run, York County, Pennsylvania =

Coordinates: 39°55′31″N 76°41′57″W

Fox Run is a neighborhood of the city of York in York County, Pennsylvania, United States. Fox Run includes both houses and apartment complexes and it is adjacent to the neighborhood of McDonald Heights.
