= Pittsburgh, Harmony, Butler and New Castle Railway =

Railway in Pennsylvania

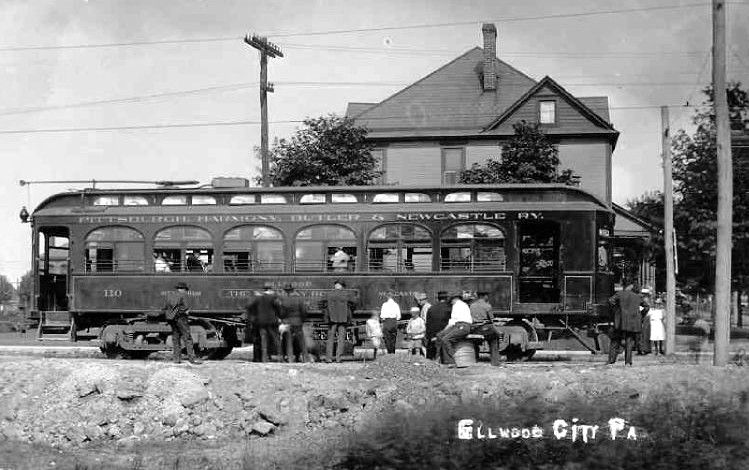
- Railway in Ellwood City, 1908

Overview
- Headquarters: Pittsburgh, Pennsylvania
- Locale: Western Pennsylvania
- Dates of operation: 1908–1931
- Successor: Pittsburgh, Mars and Butler Railway

Technical
- Track gauge: 5 ft 2 1/2 in (1,588 mm)
- Length: 118 miles (190 km)

The Pittsburgh, Harmony, Butler and New Castle Railway, commonly called the Harmony Line, was a broad gauge interurban streetcar line connecting Pittsburgh, Pennsylvania, United States to Butler and New Castle via Harmony and a split at Evans City. There was also an extension that was later added to the line from Ellwood City to Beaver Falls.

The company had a freight station in downtown Pittsburgh on the north side of Duquesne Way just west of Barbeau Street. This connected to trackage on Duquesne Way.

== History ==
=== Pittsburgh, Harmony, Butler and New Castle Railway ===
The railway was developed by business partners Russel H. Boggs and Henry Buhl as an adjunct to their department store in Pittsburgh. Mr. Boggs already had a business relationship with many of the farms between Evans City and Pittsburgh and proposed exchanging the right of way across their land for one dollar, a guaranteed trolley stop and an electricity supply. A first step in consolidation of 11 small railways into Harmony, Butler and New Castle Railway happened when the corporation was formed in 1906. The new corporation officers were President Stanley C. Vickers; vice President Harry Ethridge; Secretary, E.M. Baisinger; Treasurer, Mark G. Hibbs, all of Pittsburgh. The first trolley ran to Ellwood City on July 2, 1908. At the southern end of the line Pittsburgh Railways took over the trolley for the run into Pittsburgh, as the final few miles was over their rails. In 1914 an extension along the Beaver Valley was opened. This left Ellwood City heading south west and crossed the Beaver River on Koppel Bridge which was built for the purpose. This bridge also carried vehicle and pedestrian traffic and was subject to a toll.

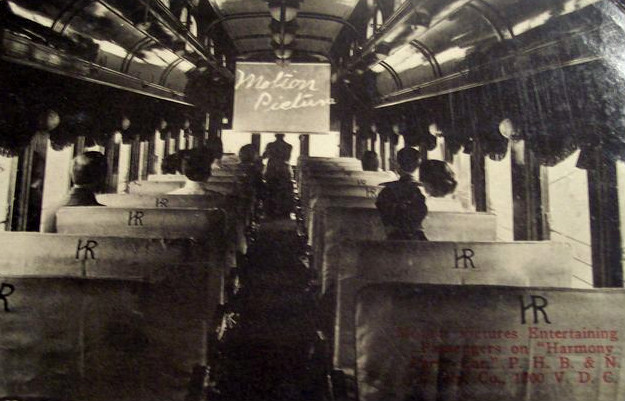
Films shown for the entertainment of the line's passengers, 1920s

=== Pittsburgh, Mars and Butler Railway ===
In 1917, the railway amalgamated with the Pittsburgh and Butler Street Railway, who operated the Butler Short Line between Pittsburgh and Butler, the new company being named the Pittsburgh, Mars and Butler Railway. The new combined system had a length of 118 miles (190 km). In 1922 the railway formed the Harmony Short Line Motor Transportation Company to carry freight between Bakerstown, and Butler. Bus services were introduced in 1923 alongside the Beaver Falls line, with Ellwood City and New Castle being added in 1924 and Butler to New Castle in 1925. Over the next 5 years further services were added, supplementing and paralleling trolley lines.

In April 1931, the company went into receivership. The Butler Short Line was closed on April 22, 1931 as it was in poor condition, services being absorbed into the existing PA 8 bus service. Beaver Falls – Ellwood City – New Castle services were replaced by buses on June 15, 1931. The remaining lines were replaced by buses on the same day, with the final trolley running on August 15, 1931. The stub of the Butler Short Line continued to be used by Pittsburgh Railways as the 2 Etna service until closure in 1952.

== Routes in 1915 ==
Evans City

All stops to Evans City departing Liberty and Market at 6:15 and every hour until 23:15. Change at Evans City for Butler or New Castle.

Butler Harmony route

Limited stop direct to Butler departing Liberty and Market at 7:45 and every hour until 19:45 with a late car at 23:50.

New Castle, Harmony route

Limited stop direct to New Castle departing Liberty and Market at 7:45 and every hour until 19:45 with a late car at 23:50.

== Incidents ==
A passenger car on the Pittsburgh, Harmony, Butler and New Castle Railway hit an open switch and crashed into a freight car on May 30, 1912. It was traveling at 35 miles per hour (56 km/h) near Harmony and 38 were injured in the impact.

Raymond Robinson

In 1919, nine-year-old Raymond Robinson was elecrocuted and severely burnt by a loose powerline, causing severe disfigurement. He lost his eyes, nose, and right arm. He became an urban legend over the years because of his late night walks on a quiet stretch of route 351. His story lives on as the legend of the green man.

== Preservation ==
Car 115 avoided being burnt when the line closed as it had mechanical problems and had been abandoned where it failed. It became a roadside diner, The Dew Drop Inn, a role it maintained until being extracted from what was now a large restaurant and recovered to the Pennsylvania Trolley Museum where it awaits restoration. In this way it avoided being burnt twice, as the inn was destroyed by fire in 1995. In addition to this car the museum also has the original Harmony dispatch board and a shelter from both the Harmony and Butler lines.

The station building in Ellwood City was retained as commercial premises. In 2007 it reopened as a doughnut shop and was renamed Ellwood Station as a reference to its origin. Rails remain in situ under part of the building.

Koppel Bridge, which was built for the Beaver Valley extension in 1915 still exists and carries PA 351 over the Beaver River between Ellwood City and Koppel.
