= McDonald Heights, Pennsylvania =

Residential village in Pennsylvania, US

Coordinates: 39°55′41″N 76°42′08″W

McDonald Heights is a residential village in York County, Pennsylvania, United States. McDonald Heights is located in the northern portion of York Township and is one of the neighborhoods of York.
