= Fox Run, Butler County, Pennsylvania =

Unincorporated community in Pennsylvania, US

Fox Run, Pennsylvania
- Former census-designated place
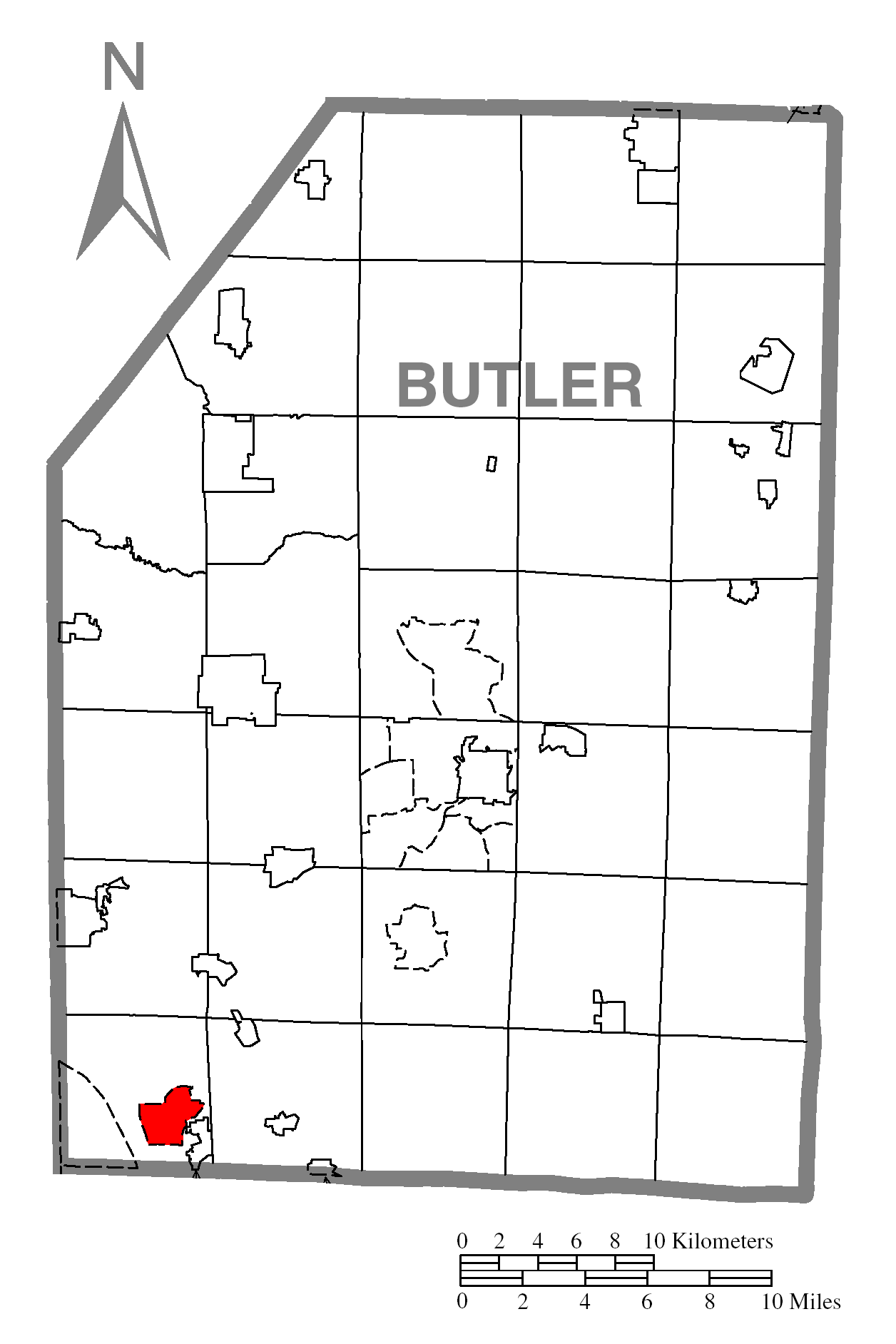
- Location within Butler County

- Location within the U.S. state of Pennsylvania Fox Run (the United States)
- Coordinates: 40°42′11″N 80°5′2″W
- Country: United States
- State: Pennsylvania
- County: Butler
- Township: Cranberry

Area
  - Total: 2.4 sq mi (6.2 km^{2})
  - Land: 2.4 sq mi (6.2 km^{2})

Population (2000)
  - Total: 3,044
  - Density: 1,300/sq mi (490/km^{2})
- Time zone: UTC-5 (Eastern (EST))
  - Summer (DST): UTC-4 (EDT)

Fox Run is a neighborhood in Cranberry Township, Butler County, Pennsylvania, United States. It is among the Township's earliest housing developments, including 320 homes built on a 131-acre site in the late 1960s. It was formerly a census-designated place (CDP), but that designation was removed as of the U.S. Census TIGER 2013 geospatial/map data update after Cranberry Township officials pointed out that creators of Internet mapping websites had misinterpreted the name of the CDP as the name of the parent township.

== Geography ==
Fox Run is located at 40°42′11″N 80°5′2″W (40.703170, −80.083778).

According to the United States Census Bureau, the CDP had a total area of 2.4 square miles (6.2 km^{2}), all land.

== Demographics ==
As of the 2000 census, there were 3,044 people, 1,011 households, and 874 families residing in the CDP. The population density was 1,266.5 inhabitants per square mile (489.0/km^{2}). There were 1,057 housing units at an average density of 439.8 per square mile (169.8/km^{2}). The racial makeup of the CDP was 96.88% White, 0.72% African American, 0.03% Native American, 1.41% Asian, 0.07% Pacific Islander, and 0.89% from two or more races. Hispanic or Latino of any race were 0.66% of the population.

There were 1,011 households, out of which 50.0% had children under the age of 18 living with them, 79.3% were married couples living together, 5.6% had a female householder with no husband present, and 13.5% were non-families. 10.4% of all households were made up of individuals, and 1.6% had someone living alone who was 65 years of age or older. The average household size was 3.01 and the average family size was 3.27.

In the CDP the population was spread out, with 31.1% under the age of 18, 6.0% from 18 to 24, 35.5% from 25 to 44, 22.9% from 45 to 64, and 4.5% who were 65 years of age or older. The median age was 34 years. For every 100 females, there were 100.4 males. For every 100 females age 18 and over, there were 96.4 males.

The median income for a household in the CDP was $68,182, and the median income for a family was $72,180. Males had a median income of $50,372 versus $30,833 for females. The per capita income for the CDP was $24,810. About 1.0% of families and 1.0% of the population were below the poverty line, including 0.7% of those under age 18 and none of those age 65 or over.
