= Valencia, Pennsylvania =

Borough in Pennsylvania, US

- Borough
- Borough of Valencia
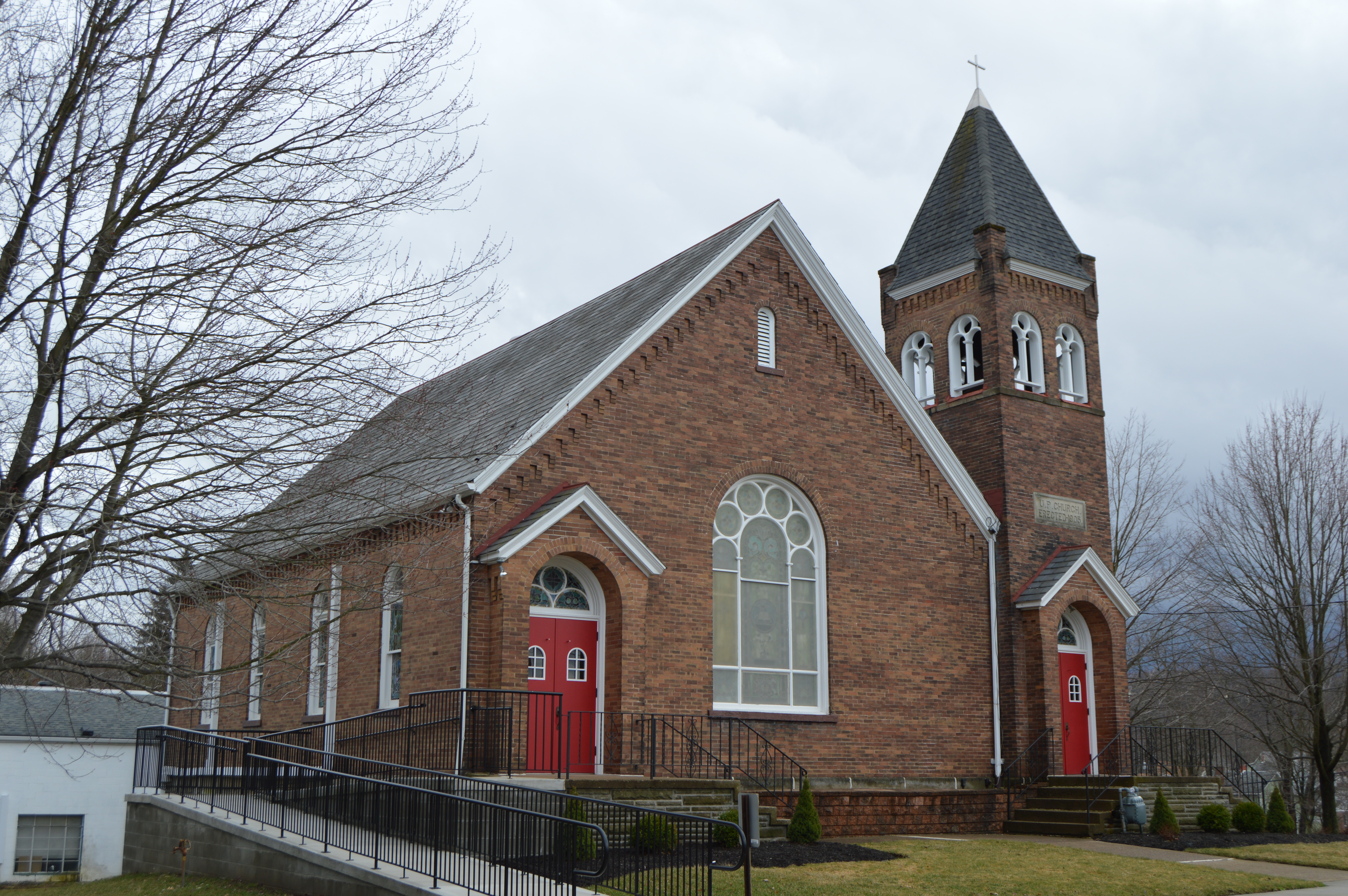
- Valencia Presbyterian Church

- Location of Valencia in Butler County, Pennsylvania.

- Location of Pennsylvania in the United States
- Coordinates: 40°40′30″N 79°59′19″W
- Country: United States
- State: Pennsylvania
- County: Butler County
- Settled: 1897

Area
  - Total: 0.34 sq mi (0.88 km^{2})
  - Land: 0.34 sq mi (0.88 km^{2})
  - Water: 0 sq mi (0.00 km^{2})

Population (2020)
  - Total: 537
  - Density: 1,580.9/sq mi (610.38/km^{2})
- Time zone: UTC-5 (EST)
  - Summer (DST): UTC-4 (EDT)
- ZIP code: 16059
- Area code: 724
- FIPS code: 42-79504
- School District: Mars Area School District
- Website: https://valenciaboro.org/

Valencia is a borough in Butler County, Pennsylvania, United States. As of the 2020 census, Valencia had a population of 537.

== History ==
The original name of the town was Brookside, and subsequently Sunnyside in the 1890s, but was changed for the railroad, by the time of its incorporation as a borough, due to an existing stop with the same name in Lancaster, Pennsylvania. It is unknown how the name Valencia was chosen. The borough's application for incorporation was granted in September 1896, and the office of burgess (later mayor) was established, to which James Douthett Magee was appointed, together with a seven-member council consisting of Edward Cowan, J. D. Perry, C. F. Harrobin, J. A. Cox, J. C. Barr, P. E. Cooper, and W. J. Craig.

== Geography ==
Valencia is located along the southern border of Butler County at 40°40′30″N 79°59′19″W (40.674906, -79.988493), in the valley of Breakneck Creek near its source. It is bordered to the north, east, and west by Adams Township and to the south by Richland and Pine townships in Allegheny County.

According to the United States Census Bureau, Valencia has a total area of 0.34 square miles (0.87 km^{2}), all land.

== Demographics ==
Historical population
Census	Pop.	Note	%±
1900	149		—
1910	240		61.1%
1920	303		26.3%
1930	308		1.7%
1940	296		−3.9%
1950	298		0.7%
1960	310		4.0%
1970	351		13.2%
1980	340		−3.1%
1990	364		7.1%
2000	384		5.5%
2010	551		43.5%
2020	537		−2.5%
U.S. Decennial Census

As of the 2000 census, there were 384 people, 100 households, and 75 families residing in the borough. The population density was 996.2 inhabitants per square mile (384.6/km^{2}). There were 106 housing units at an average density of 275.0 per square mile (106.2/km^{2}). The racial makeup of the borough was 98.18% White, 0.52% African American, 0.78% Pacific Islander, and 0.52% from two or more races.

There were 100 households, out of which 35.0% had children under the age of 18 living with them, 57.0% were married couples living together, 13.0% had a female householder with no husband present, and 25.0% were non-families. 23.0% of all households were made up of individuals, and 10.0% had someone living alone who was 65 years of age or older. The average household size was 18.61 and the average family size was 24.09. In the borough the population was spread out, with 20.1% under the age of 18, 3.6% from 18 to 24, 19.8% from 25 to 44, 15.4% from 45 to 64, and 41.1% who were 65 years of age or older. The median age was 51 years. For every 100 females there were 70.7 males. For every 100 females age 18 and over, there were 60.7 males. The median income for a household in the borough was $37,500, and the median income for a family was $38,333. Males had a median income of $25,750 versus $26,875 for females. The per capita income for the borough was $16,501. About 7.7% of families and 13.4% of the population were below the poverty line, including 29.4% of those under age 18 and none of those age 65 or over.

== Education ==
Valencia is within the Mars Area School District. The district consists of Mars Area Primary Center, Mars Area Elementary School, Mars Area Centennial School, Mars Area Middle School, and Mars Area High School.
