= Fox Run =

Fox Run may refer to:

- Fox Run, Pennsylvania (disambiguation), several neighborhoods in the U.S. state of Pennsylvania
- Fox Run, Stoney Creek, a tributary of Stoney Creek (Delaware), itself a tributary of the Delaware River in the Eastern U.S.
- The Fox Run, a 1986 post-apocalyptic novel written by David L. Robbins
- Mall at Fox Run, originally the Fox Run Mall, a former shopping mall in Newington, New Hampshire, U.S.
- Terry Fox Run, an annual non-competitive charity event named after Canadian cancer activist Terry Fox

== See also ==
- Fox on the Run (disambiguation)
