= Mars Area High School =

Coordinates: 40.6920°N 79.9798°W

Location
- 520 Route 228; Mars, Pennsylvania 16046

Information
- Type: Public
- Established: 1967
- School district: Mars Area School District
- Principal: Lindsay Rosswog
- Staff: 100 (on an FTE basis)
- Grades: 9-12
- Enrollment: 1,048 (2023-2024)
- Student to teacher ratio: 10.95
- Colors: Navy and gold
- Athletics conference: A-AAA
- Mascot: Fightin' Planet
- Newspaper: The Planet Press
- Website: Mars k12 www.marsk12.org

Mars Area High School is a high school located in Mars, Pennsylvania.

== Notable alumni ==
- David Bednar (2013), All Star pitcher for the New York Yankees
- Will Bednar (2019), pitcher in the San Francisco Giants organization
- Chloe Lukasiak (2019), Dance Moms cast member and dancer, actress and author
- JJ Wetherholt (2021), infielder for the St. Louis Cardinals
