= Middlesex Township, Butler County, Pennsylvania =

Township in Pennsylvania, US

Coordinates: 40°41′57″N 79°55′28″W

- Township
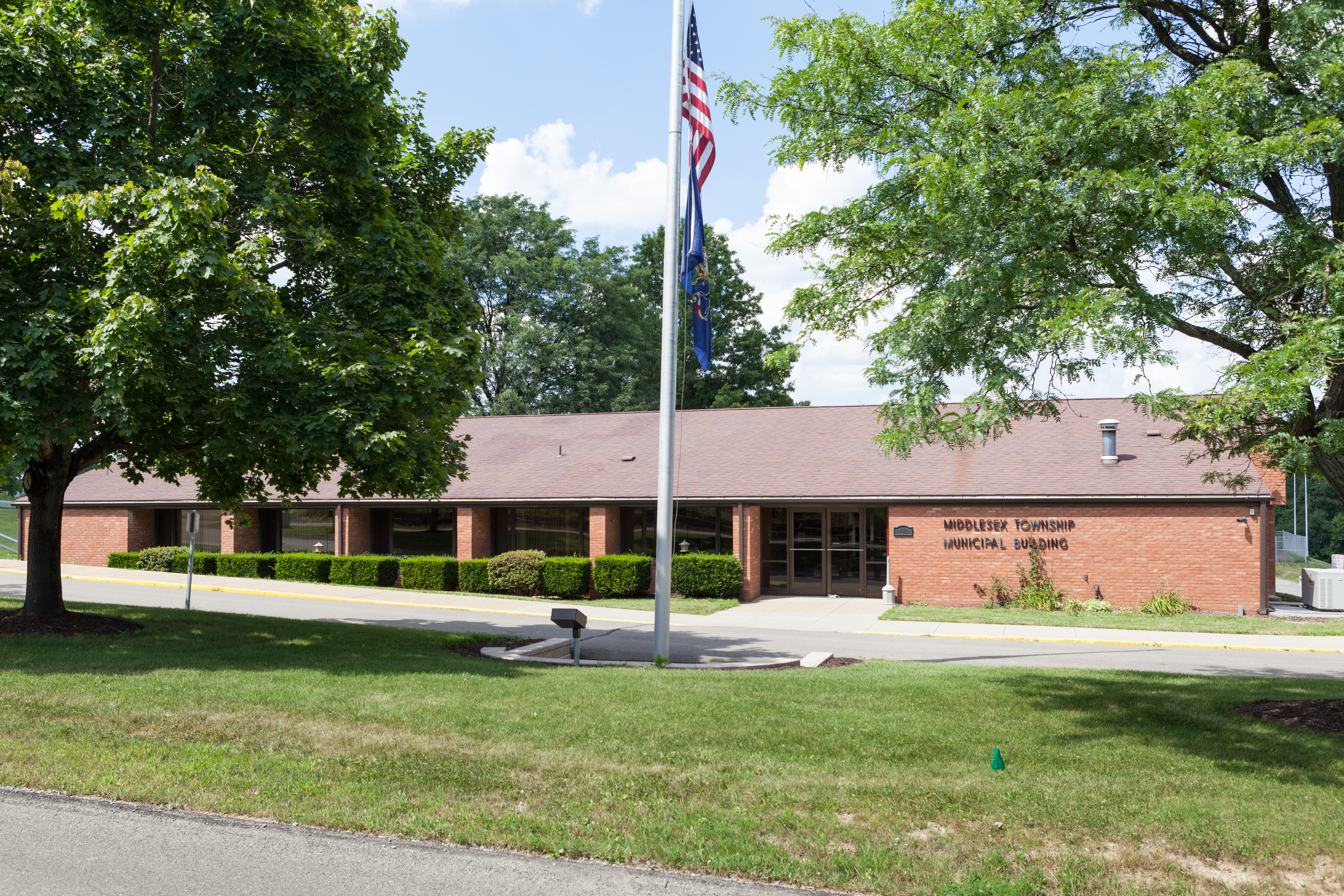
- Municipal Building at 133 Browns Hill Road, Valencia

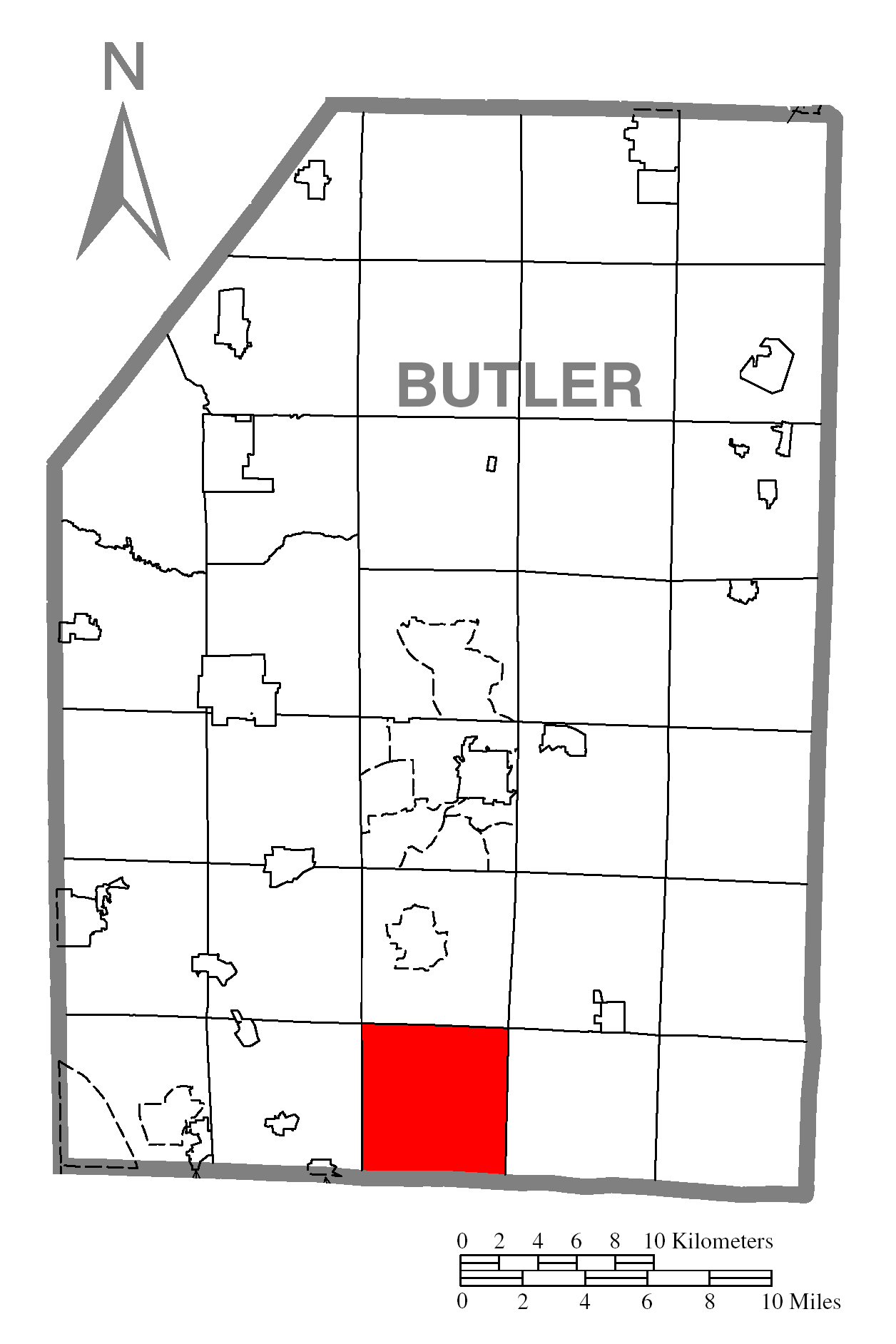
- Map of Butler County, Pennsylvania, highlighting Middlesex Township

- Map of Butler County, Pennsylvania
- Country: United States
- State: Pennsylvania
- County: Butler
- Settled: 1795
- Incorporated: 1800

Area
  - Total: 23.22 sq mi (60.13 km^{2})
  - Land: 23.15 sq mi (59.95 km^{2})
  - Water: 0.073 sq mi (0.19 km^{2})

Population (2020)
  - Total: 6,826
  - Estimate (2022): 7,338
  - Density: 243.3/sq mi (93.95/km^{2})
- Time zone: UTC-5 (Eastern (EST))
  - Summer (DST): UTC-4 (EDT)
- FIPS code: 42-019-49056
- Website: www.middlesextownship.org

Middlesex Township is a township in Butler County, Pennsylvania, United States. The population was 6,826 at the 2020 census.

== Geography ==
Middlesex Township is located in south-central Butler County, with Allegheny County to the south. The unincorporated communities of Cooperstown and Glade Mills are near the center of the township along Pennsylvania Route 8, which crosses the township from north to south.

According to the United States Census Bureau, the township has a total area of 23.2 square miles (60.1 km^{2}), of which 23.1 square miles (59.9 km^{2}) is land and 0.077 square miles (0.2 km^{2}), or 0.31%, is water.

=== Streams ===
Deer Creek and Bull Creek have their headwaters in the southeastern section of the township, whence they flow south to the Allegheny River in Allegheny County.

== Demographics ==
Historical population
Census	Pop.	Note	%±
2010	5,390		—
2020	6,826		26.6%
2022 (est.)	7,338		7.5%
U.S. Decennial Census

As of the 2000 census, there were 5,586 people, 2,045 households, and 1,615 families residing in the township. The population density was 243.2 inhabitants per square mile (93.9/km^{2}). There were 2,105 housing units at an average density of 91.7 per square mile (35.4/km^{2}). The racial makeup of the township was 98.89% White, 0.25% African American, 0.09% Native American, 0.16% Asian, 0.02% Pacific Islander, 0.20% from other races, and 0.39% from two or more races. Hispanic or Latino of any race were 0.68% of the population.

There were 2,045 households, out of which 37.3% had children under the age of 18 living with them, 68.8% were married couples living together, 7.2% had a female householder with no husband present, and 21.0% were non-families. 18.1% of all households were made up of individuals, and 8.0% had someone living alone who was 65 years of age or older. The average household size was 2.73 and the average family size was 3.12.

In the township the population was spread out, with 27.2% under the age of 18, 5.7% from 18 to 24, 28.5% from 25 to 44, 25.7% from 45 to 64, and 12.8% who were 65 years of age or older. The median age was 40 years. For every 100 females, there were 97.1 males. For every 100 females age 18 and over, there were 96.4 males.

The median income for a household in the township was $49,743, and the median income for a family was $56,199. Males had a median income of $40,827 versus $28,342 for females. The per capita income for the township was $23,508. About 3.4% of families and 3.9% of the population were below the poverty line, including 4.3% of those under age 18 and 4.6% of those age 65 or over.

== Education ==
Middlesex Township is within the Mars Area School District. The district consists of Mars Area Primary Center, Mars Area Elementary School, Mars Area Centennial School, Mars Area Middle School, and Mars Area High School.
