= Cranberry Township, Butler County, Pennsylvania =

Township in Pennsylvania, US

- Township
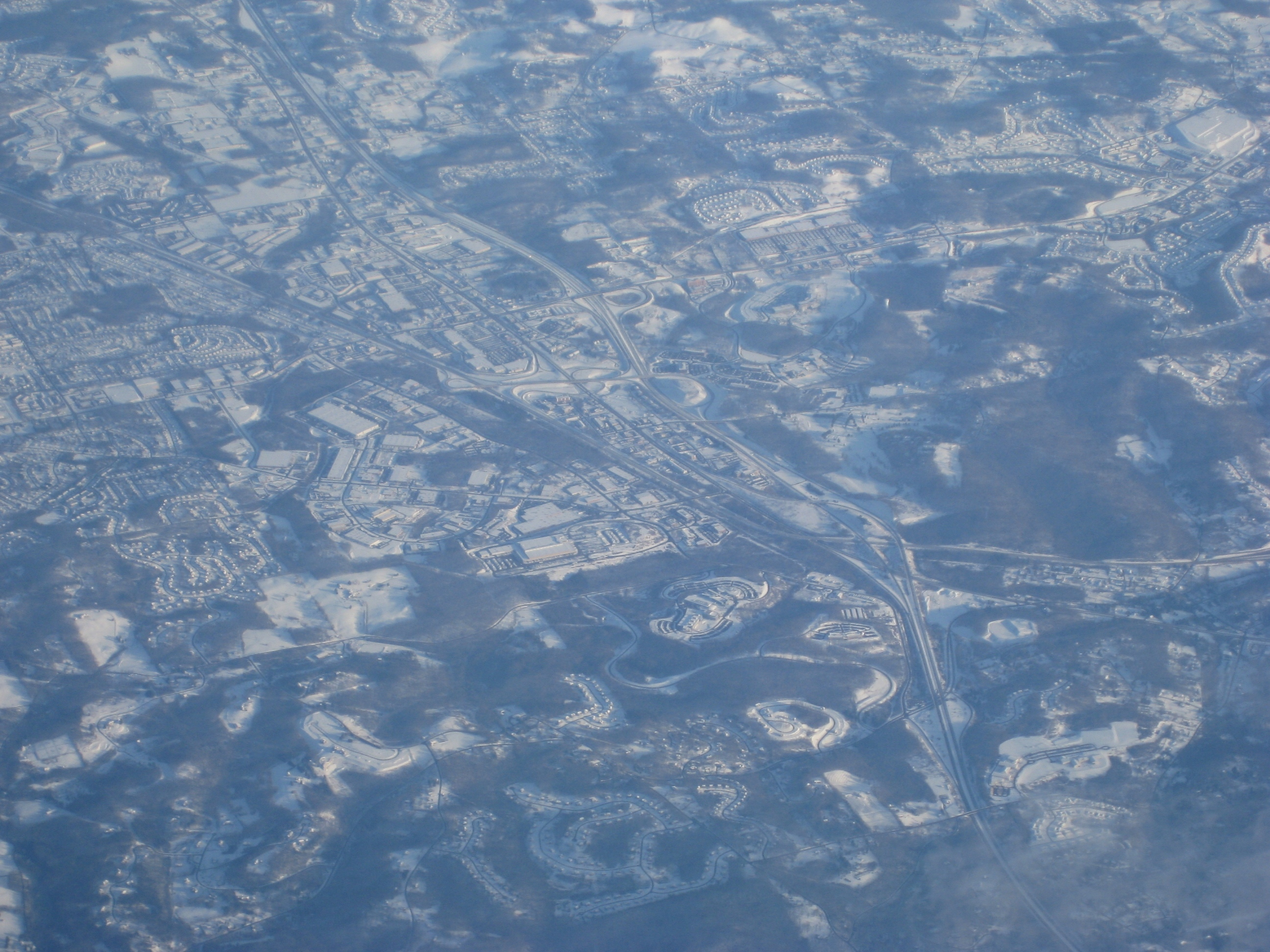
- Aerial photo of Cranberry Township (looking north-north-east)

- Logo

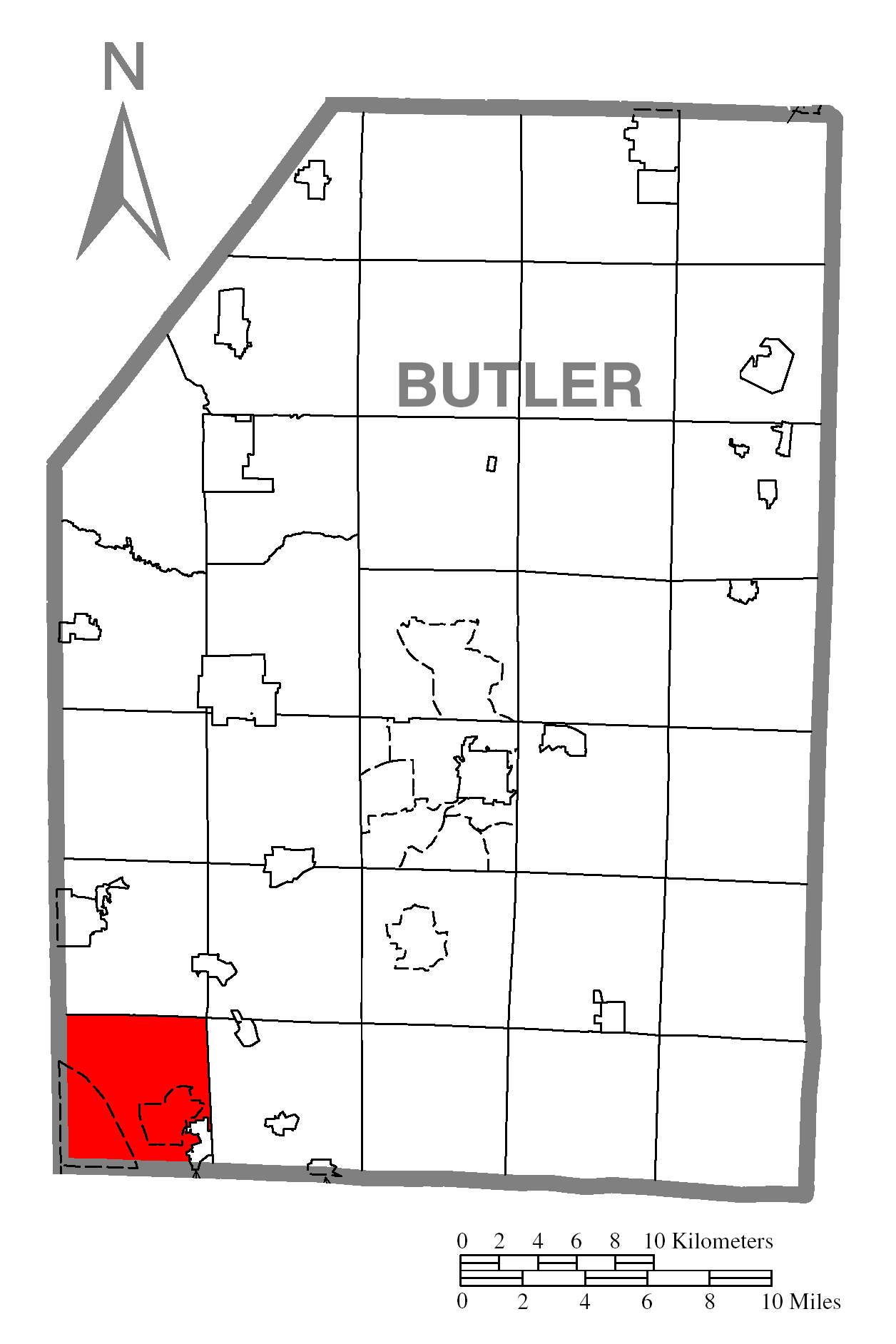
- Location of Cranberry Township in Butler County

- Location of Cranberry Township in Pennsylvania Cranberry Township (the United States)
- Coordinates: 40°42′N 80°06′W
- Country: United States
- State: Pennsylvania
- County: Butler
- Settled: 1796
- Incorporated: 1804

Government
  - Chairman: Richard Hadley (R)

Area
  - Total: 22.83 sq mi (59.13 km^{2})
  - Land: 22.82 sq mi (59.11 km^{2})
  - Water: 0.0039 sq mi (0.01 km^{2})

Population (2020)
  - Total: 33,087
  - Estimate (2022): 33,955
  - Density: 1,450/sq mi (559.9/km^{2})
- Time zone: UTC-5 (EST)
  - Summer (DST): UTC-4 (EDT)
- Area codes: 724, 878
- FIPS code: 42-019-16920
- Website: www.cranberrytownship.org

Cranberry Township is a township in southwestern Butler County, Pennsylvania, United States. The population was 33,087 as of the 2020 census. It is one of the fastest-growing areas of the Pittsburgh metropolitan area.

== History ==
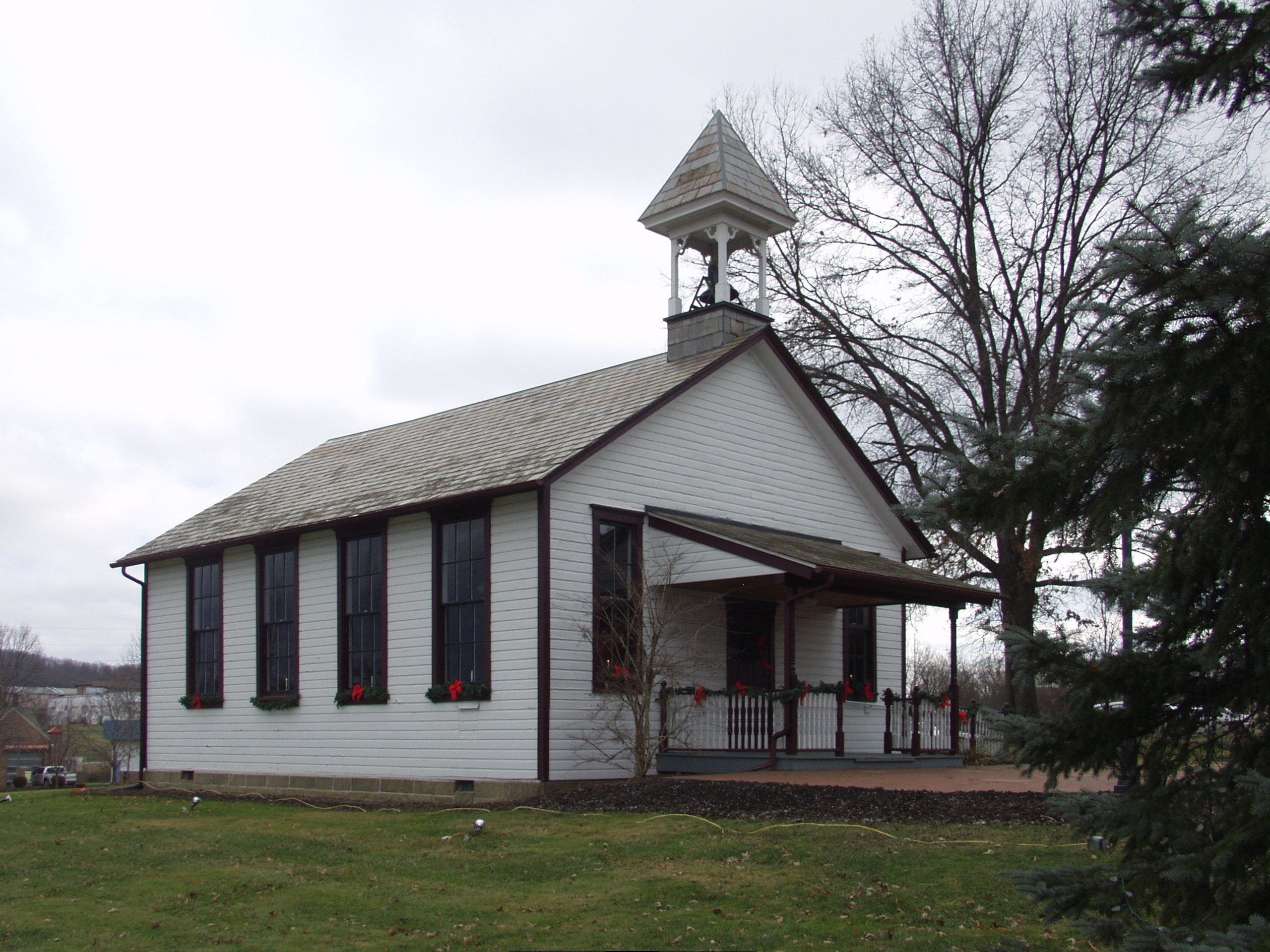
Sample Schoolhouse

In 1753, George Washington, then 21, was working for the Virginia Colony's British governor and hiked through what became Cranberry Township along the Venango Path. His assignment was to deliver a message to the commander of the rival French Fort LeBoeuf that ordered the French to withdraw from northern Pennsylvania. The commander rejected the order, precipitating the French and Indian War, which the British and their colonies ultimately won but at a cost.

The township's name derives from the wild cranberries that were abundant along the banks of Brush Creek prior to the 20th century. For centuries, the cranberries had attracted deer, which, in turn, attracted Native American hunters. However, drought and farming combined to eliminate the township's namesake fruit by the 1880s. When the township was originally chartered in 1804, it had a substantially larger area. In 1854, its boundaries were redrawn, reducing Cranberry from 81 to 25 square miles. Although the Iroquois, the Delaware, and Seneca nations had hunted and fished in the Cranberry area for centuries, the first European settlers, Mathew and William Graham, arrived in 1796. There, the brothers both acquired 200 acres of land that Benjamin Franklin had designated as part of the nation's Depreciation Land program, used to pay Revolutionary War soldiers with land, which was abundant, rather than in cash, which was scarce.

Over the following decades, the Graham family and Samuel Duncan, another early settler, opened a tavern, a distillery, a sawmill, and a grist mill. In 1806, Graham began the community's first church, the Plains Church, (later the Plains United Presbyterian Church), which remains an active congregation. Descendants of the Graham family continue to reside in the community, which is sometimes confused with the homonymous Cranberry Township in Venango County (formerly Fairfield Township, founded 1806), a much smaller community 60 mi (97 km) away.

Prior to World War II, Cranberry Township was primarily an agricultural community, without a traditional downtown. Although small stores, taverns, mills and implement-making shops had operated in Cranberry for years, its development did not really accelerate until the Pennsylvania Turnpike's western section was completed in 1951, with an exit at Route 19, Cranberry's main arterial road, followed by the 1966 opening of I -79, which crossed the Turnpike at the township's southern end. With support and encouragement from the nonprofit Cranberry Industrial Development Corporation, formed by the township's board of supervisors in the mid-1960s, a local industrial park was created and quickly filled. It was soon followed by other business and light industrial park facilities catering to companies seeking inexpensive land with easy highway access. The 1989 opening of I-279 further accelerated the township's growth, shortening the drive time to Downtown Pittsburgh to less than half an hour.

Cranberry Township also contains several smaller, unincorporated census-designated places, including Fernway and Fox Run, neighborhoods whose names continue to appear on some online maps. The Cranberry Township Historical Society, formed in 1984, was created to collect and preserve relics of the community's early local history; a permanent display of early artifacts is currently under construction in the township's Municipal Center.

As of September 2019, Cranberry Township is a sister city to Haiyang, a county-level city in China.

== Geography ==
Cranberry Township is located in western Pennsylvania (40.70996 N, 80.10605 W). Although it is often described as a residential suburb of Pittsburgh, less than a 30-minute drive to its downtown, Cranberry is also a regional, economic, and employment center in its own right. The number of people commuting into the township to participate in its 20,500-member workforce is considerably larger than the 9,200 township residents who commute to work outside Cranberry.

According to the United States Census Bureau, the township has a total area of 22.8 square miles (59 km^{2}), 0.004 square miles (0.010 km^{2}), or 0.02%, of which is water.

=== Surrounding neighborhoods ===
Cranberry Township borders seven municipalities, including Jackson Township to the north, Forward Township at its northeastern corner, Adams Township to the east, Seven Fields to the southeast, the Allegheny County townships of Pine and Marshall to the south, and the Beaver County township of New Sewickley to the west.

== Demographics ==
Historical population
Census	Pop.	Note	%±
1870	479		—
1880	1,180		146.3%
1960	3,596		—
1970	4,873		35.5%
1980	11,066		127.1%
1990	14,816		33.9%
2000	23,625		59.5%
2010	28,098		18.9%
2020	33,096		17.8%
2025 (est.)	35,244		6.5%

As of July 2015, the U.S. Census estimated the township's population at 30,458 in 10,769 households. The population density was 1,231.1 inhabitants per square mile (475.3/km^{2}). The racial makeup of the township was 94.4% White, 1.2% African American, 2.8% Asian, and 1.1% from two or more races. Cranberry is a family-oriented community. As of 2012, 71.98% of Cranberry's male population 15 and older was married; the corresponding figure for females was 69.45%. The national rates were 53.97% and 51.02%, respectively. 44.5% of the township's households had children under 18 living with them and household size averaged 3.22. The median population age as of 2016 was 35.96. The median income for a household in the township in 2024 was $125,126. Approximately 2.5% of families were below the poverty line.

== Economy ==
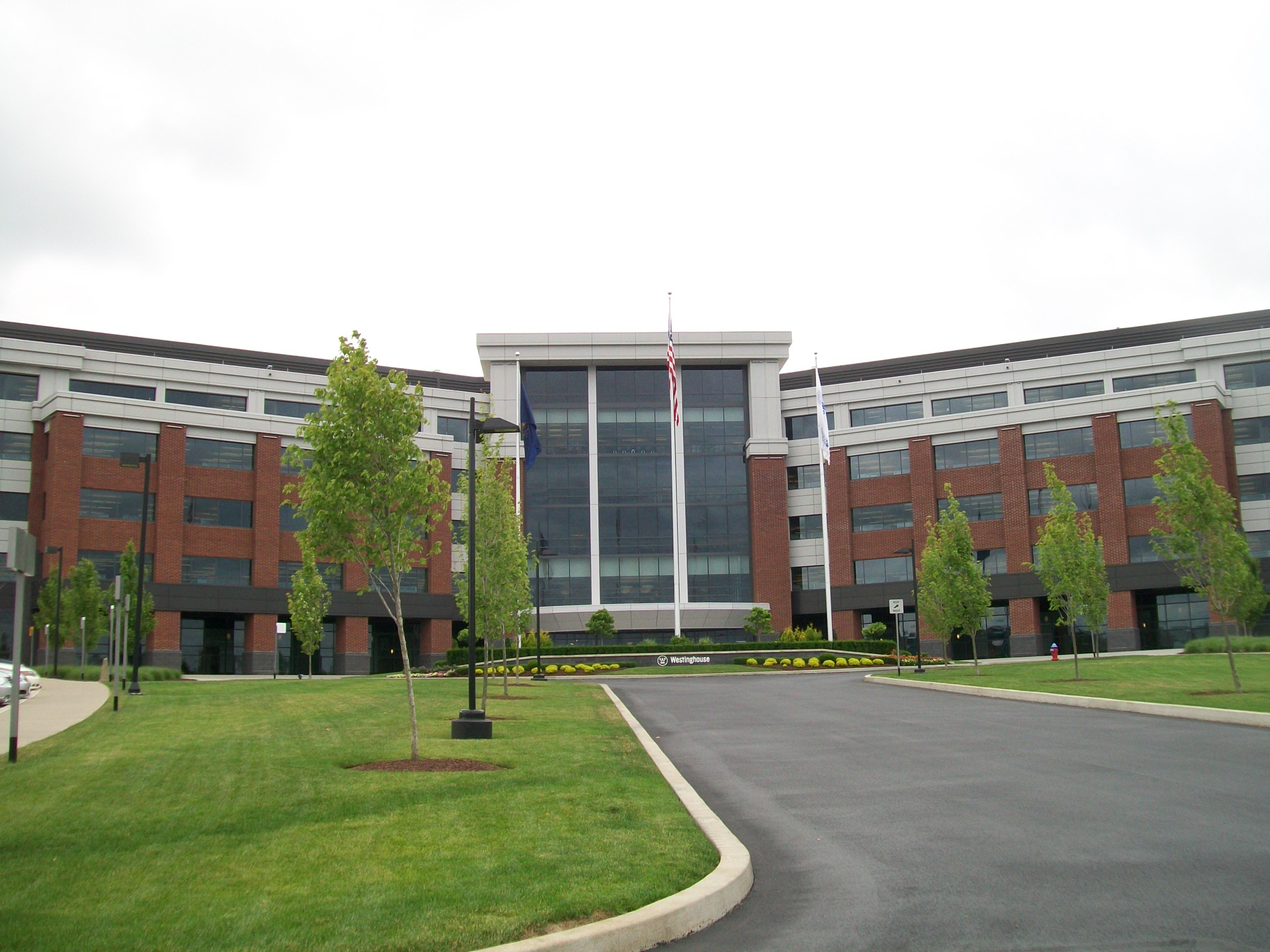
Westinghouse Electric Company headquarters

There are more than 1,000 businesses in Cranberry. The township's economic development has been balanced, involving a variety of industries. Ordinances affecting its commercial growth have been enacted under guidance from comprehensive plans adopted by the township's board of supervisors in 1977, 1995, and 2009.

Beyond its emergence as a major regional retail and hospitality center, the primary engine of Cranberry's local economy has been its growing family of corporate, industrial and research organizations. There are currently around 20,500 jobs in Cranberry. Far more people commute into Cranberry for work than commute from the township to work at jobs elsewhere.

Cranberry is home to major operations of McKesson Automation-Aseynt, PPG Architectural Coatings, Alcoa-Kwaneer, MSA Safety, Gatan, Giant Eagle and Westinghouse Electric Company. It is also the base for a growing number of technology startups as well as for professional, manufacturing, finance, retail and hospitality businesses.

Cranberry's largest employer is Westinghouse Electric Company, whose headquarters relocated from Monroeville, Pennsylvania, to Cranberry Woods Business Park in 2009. More than 3,000 people work at the campus at Cranberry; its business is focused on the design, construction, maintenance and decommissioning of nuclear power plants worldwide. Westinghouse was a division of the Toshiba Corporation of Japan until 2018 when it was purchased by Brookfield Business Partners.

In August 2015, the Pittsburgh Penguins and UPMC opened a new hockey practice and sports medicine facility in Cranberry near the PA 228/I-79 interchange. The UPMC Lemieux Sports Complex is named for former Penguin and current team co-owner Mario Lemieux.

As of December 2018, Cranberry Township continues to expand with the new additions of restaurants and other store fronts to the UPMC Lemieux Sports Complex area along with a new hotel. There are plans to further expand the area with new restaurant developments and new retail space. Outside of the UPMC Lemieux Sports Complex area, Cranberry Township has added over 20 new businesses, with more currently under construction.

== Government ==
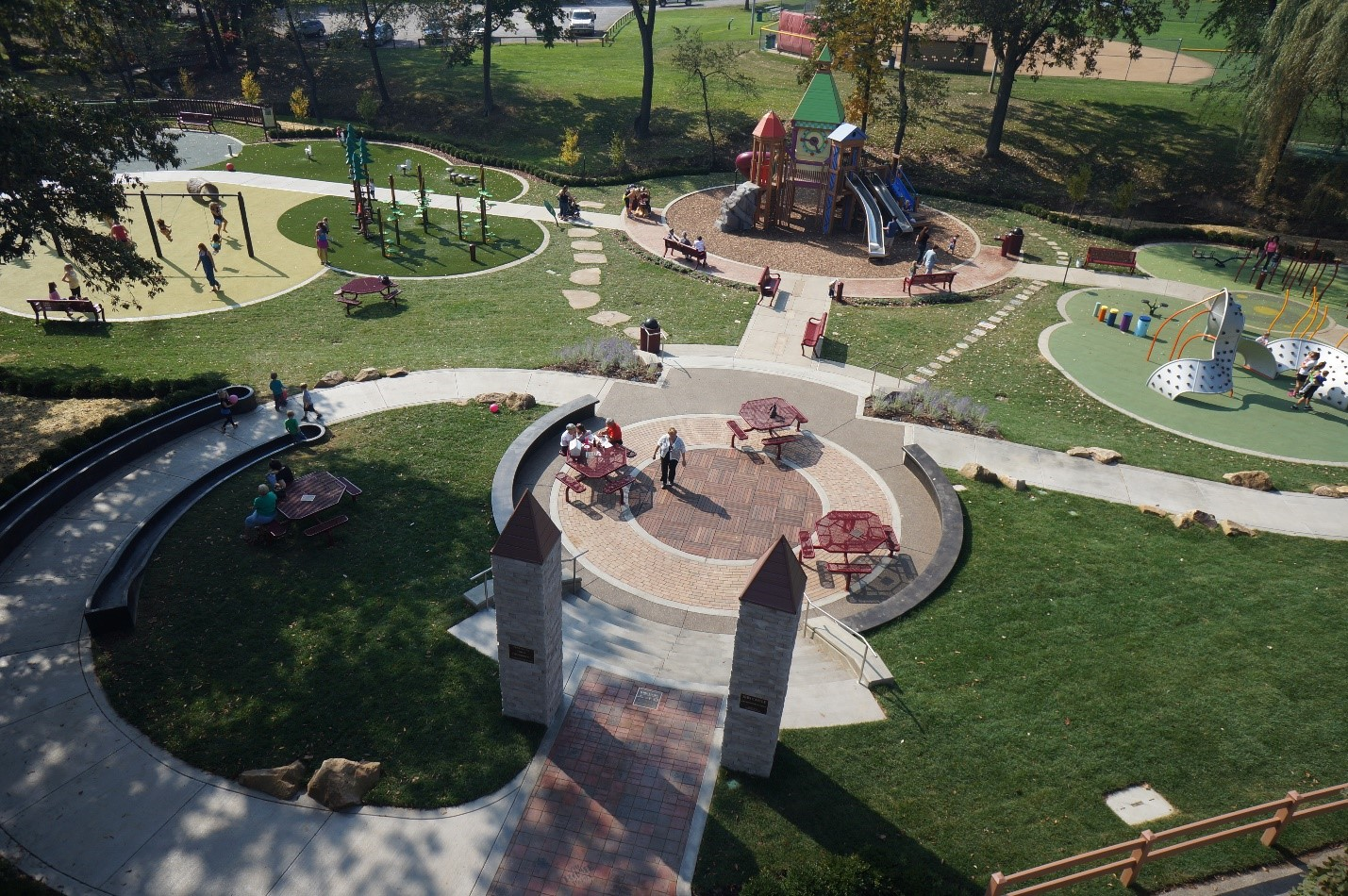
Kids Castle in Cranberry Community Park

The township's policy-making body is its five-member, at-large board of supervisors who are each elected to serve six-year terms. As of 2024, the composition of the board was entirely Republican:

- Mike Manipole, Chairman (R)
- Bruce Hezlep, Vice Chairman (R)
- Bruce Mazzoni, (R)
- John Skorupan (R)
- Karen Newpol (R)

The township has a full-time police force of 30 officers, a volunteer fire company supported by a dedicated property tax, and an independent Emergency Medical Service organization that coordinates with the township's other emergency services. Cranberry is also the local supplier of fresh water and wastewater treatment, both of which are funded by ratepayers. Cranberry owns, maintains and offers programs in three major municipal parks (Cranberry Park, North Boundary Park, and Graham Park) as well as an open-air waterpark and an award-winning 18-hole municipal golf course, Cranberry Highlands. Miracle League of Southwestern Pennsylvania has a ballfield in Graham Park with an adjacent fully accessible playground. Cranberry Public Library operates out of the township's Municipal Center building, as do its Early Education Preschool Program, its aerobics programs, and its administrative offices.

== Transportation ==
The north–south Interstate 79 and the east–west Pennsylvania Turnpike (Interstate 76) both run through Cranberry Township. U.S. Route 19 and Pennsylvania Route 228 are also important arterial roads in the municipality. All four roads are connected by an interchange, a $44.3 million PennDOT/Pennsylvania Turnpike venture, which opened in 2004 to provide direct, non-stop connection between those heavily traveled roads. Access to the northern terminus of Interstate 279, an important artery that serves as a direct expressway to Downtown Pittsburgh from the north, is located 6 mi (10 km) south of the township.

During the fall of 2021, the MSA Thruway, a tunnel that connects Interstate 79 to the Cranberry Springs development in Cranberry Township, was finalized. Construction of the $12 million project underneath Route 228 began in May 2020. This new route allows motorists to travel under the north side of Route 228 without any stoplights.

Between 1908 and 1931, Cranberry Township was served by an interurban trolley line to Pittsburgh as well as to points north. No other rail service has ever been available in the township, and no regularly scheduled transit service is offered there. Today, motorized transportation in Cranberry is provided only by private vehicles.

== Culture and recreation ==
During the summer months, the township hosts its weekly Town Square Market, which includes farm-fresh produce, homemade crafts and goods, live music, and food trucks. An annual Community Days event includes live music, dance, crafts, programs, carnival, 5K, and fireworks.

Cranberry owns, maintains and offers programs in three major municipal parks (Cranberry Park, North Boundary Park, and Graham Park) as well as an open-air waterpark and an award-winning 18-hole municipal golf course, Cranberry Highlands. Miracle League of Southwestern Pennsylvania has a ballfield in Graham Park with an adjacent fully accessible playground. Cranberry Public Library operates out of the township's Municipal Center building, as do its Early Education Preschool Program, its aerobics programs, and its administrative offices.

== Notable people ==
- Don Barclay, NFL offensive guard
- Thomas Bickerton, United Methodist bishop
- Lynn Geisler, dirt late model driver
- Nick Jones, ice hockey defenseman
- Nick Mira, record producer and songwriter
- Joey Porter Jr., NFL cornerback
- Stephenie Scialabba, former member of the Pennsylvania House of Representatives
- Jim Stanek, actor
