= Seneca Valley School District =

School district in Pennsylvania

Coordinates: 40.79282°N 80.07565°W

Seneca Valley
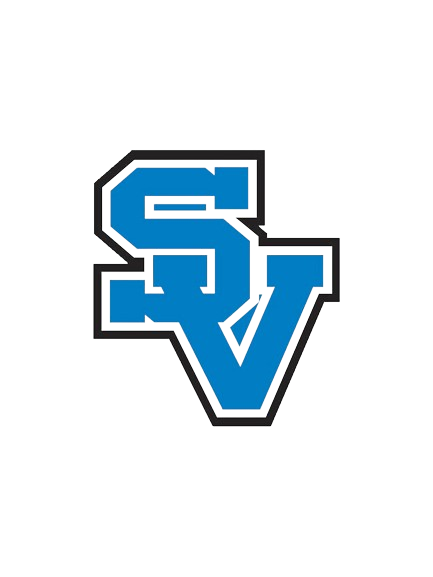

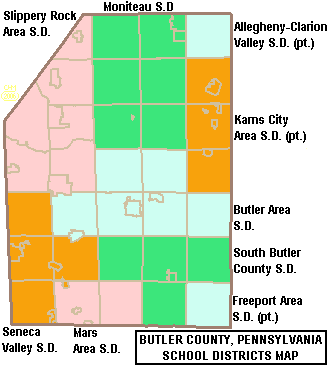

Location
- Harmony, Pennsylvania, Pennsylvania; United States

District information
- Type: Public
- Motto: Proud of the Past, Committed to the Future
- Grades: K-12
- Established: 1967
- Superintendent: Dr. Tracy Vitale, Ed.D.
- Deputy superintendent(s): Mallory Eyles, Psy.D.; Sean McCarty, Ed.D.; Matt McKinley, Ed.D.; Marie Palano, Ed.D.
- Business administrator: Lynn Burtner
- School board: Leslie Bredl; Eric DiTullio; Susan Harrison; Mike Jacobs; James Nickel; Fred Peterson; Matt Hoffman (Solicitor); Julia Benson (Secretary)
- Chair of the board: Tim Hester, President; Jeff Widdowson, VP
- Budget: $151,441,614

Students and staff
- Students: 7,409
- Teachers: 518
- District mascot: Raiders
- Colors: Blue and Black

Other information
- Phone Number: (724) 452-6040
- Twitter: @Seneca_Valley
- Snapchat: @SenecaValleySD
- Website: www.svsd.net

The Seneca Valley School District is a public school district in Butler County, Pennsylvania. It is centered on Jackson Township and nearby Cranberry Township, a quickly growing municipality. It encompasses approximately 95 square miles (250 km^{2}) and also includes the boroughs of Harmony, Evans City, Callery, Zelienople and Seven Fields, as well as the townships of Forward and Lancaster.

== Elementary schools ==
=== Connoquenessing Valley Elementary School ===
Connoquenessing Valley Elementary School (C.V.E.) serves Zelienople, Harmony, and environs, including parts of Jackson Township, Cranberry Township, and all of Lancaster Township. The school is located at 300 Pittsburgh Street in Zelienople.

CVE, one of four elementary schools in the Seneca Valley School District, has 740 students in grades K-4. Student support services include: Language Support, Learning Support, Autistic Support, Speech/Occupational/Physical Therapy and Title One Reading Support.

The school courtyard has been updated to include gardens that harvest student grown vegetables.

=== Evans City Elementary School ===
Evans City Elementary School served Evans City, Callery and environs, including Forward Township and parts of Cranberry Township and Jackson Township. The school was located at 345 West Main Street (Pennsylvania Route 68) in Evans City and was colocated with Evans City Middle School.

The school ended instruction in 2022 after completion of Ehrman Crest Elementary School in Cranberry Township. Evans City Elementary & Middle School was demolished in 2025.

=== Haine Elementary School ===
Haine Elementary School serves primarily western Cranberry Township. The school is located at 1516 Haine School Road in Cranberry Township and is colocated with Haine Middle School.

Haine Elementary School recently received two Keystone Awards from the Pennsylvania Department of Education for Meeting Adequate Yearly Progress (AYP) in three consecutive years for its students' results on the statewide PSSA testing.

=== Rowan Elementary School ===
Rowan Elementary School serves primarily eastern Cranberry Township and Seven Fields. The school is located at 8051 Rowan Road in Cranberry Township. There are 510 students in grades K-4. 72% of students scored at or above the proficient level for math, and 82% scored at or above that level for reading.

=== Ehrman Crest Elementary School ===
Ehrmann Crest Elementary School serves children in Cranberry Township and northern areas of the district. It is a brand new building, completed in 2022. "Along with the new features, Ehrman Crest Elementary/Middle school is the first school in the state to have a tornado shelter. The new school can hold 1,400 students."

== Middle schools ==
=== Grades 5–6 ===
These middle schools were created with the intention of adjusting elementary students to high school. The schools use a "team-teaching" approach wherein students will have a classroom to which they are assigned, and the entire class will move to a different room for different classes such as science, math, or social studies. While the students stay with their same class, they experience changing teachers and changing classes for the first time.

==== Evans City Middle School ====
Evans City Middle School served students who attended Evans City Elementary School and Connoquenessing Valley Elementary School. The school was located on 345A West Main Street (Pennsylvania Route 68) in Evans City and shared a building with Evans City Elementary School.

The school's facilities included the "Little Creek Nature Trail", built by staff, students, and volunteers. Evans City Middle School was closed in 2022 and replaced with Ehrman Crest Middle School. The building was demolished in 2025.

==== Haine Middle School ====
Haine Middle School serves students who attended Haine Elementary School or Rowan Elementary School and is located on 1516A Haine School Road and shares a building with Haine Elementary School. The school hosts its own PRIDE team, which organizes cleanups of the school's campus by its students.

==== Ehrman Crest Middle School ====
Ehrman Crest Elementary/Middle School is a public school located at 2070 Ehrman Road in Cranberry Township, Pennsylvania. It is part of the Seneca Valley School District. The school was opened in 2022 and has approximately 900 students. It was built to replace Evan City Middle School, which was falling into disrepair.

=== Grades 7–8 ===
==== Ryan Gloyer Middle School ====
Ryan Gloyer Middle School (RGMS), previously known as Seneca Valley Middle School, serves all students within the district and is located on the main campus in Harmony. The address of the school is 122 Seneca School Road.

The middle school is set up to adjust students further into high school life. While students freely change classes as in an American high school, five of their eight daily classes are all with teachers who teach on a team. These five teachers teach the same set of students on a "team" so that students will have classes with the same group of students and not have to deal with stresses on the same day, missing many classes for field trips, and so on. These teams also act as a microcosm of the high school atmosphere, instilling their own 'team spirit' on students and hosting team parties.

The school offers a choir program, a student band, an option to learn foreign languages, classes in performing arts, and classes in various mediums of design. Eighth grade students are required to take fourteen weeks of two different home economics courses and twenty-two weeks of three different industrial shop classes.

The Seneca Valley Middle School was renamed in 2018 in honor of Sgt. 1st Class Ryan A. Gloyer, graduating class of 2000, who died courageously in battle in 2016.

==== Extracurriculars ====
The school recognizes many sports which compete amongst each other or against different schools. These sports include boys' and girls' basketball, cheerleading, cross country, boys' and girls' soccer, softball, ice hockey, roller hockey, swimming, table tennis, and wrestling. Competitive and non-competitive clubs include academic games, Academic Decathlon (United States Academic Decathlon) art club, chess and checkers club, computer club, helping hands club, library club, newspaper, sportsman's club, video club, weightlifting club, and yearbook committee.

== High schools ==
The middle school, intermediate high school, and senior high school are located together on one main, inner-city campus in Harmony.

The high schools are part of an 'open campus' system wherein students may on occasion have a class in a building they are not assigned to by grade and must walk to their class in the other building. The high schools also share most extracurricular activities and ensembles such as the Seneca Valley JROTC, SVTV, Academic Decathlon, NHS, Student Council, and Hope Squad

=== Seneca Valley Intermediate High School ===
Seneca Valley Intermediate High School (IHS) serves all students within the district and is located on the main campus in Harmony.

The IHS includes facilities such as a 1,100-seat auditorium, gymnasium, swimming pool, weight room, music rooms, art rooms, and many biology and chemistry labs. A courtyard has been updated and facilitated within the school and is available to students.

==== Newspaper ====
The IHS publishes its own newspaper, the Seneca Arrowhead. A wide variety of classes are offered to students within the IHS, mostly from students in 9th or 10th grade, though 11th and 12th grade students take classes within the building as well. The SHS also has its own newspaper, the Seneca Scout.

=== Seneca Valley Senior High School ===
Seneca Valley Senior High School serves all students within the district and is located on the main campus in Harmony. The class of 2018 had over 560 students.

As of April 30, 2007, the new addition to the Senior High School has been opened for student use.

The senior high school's facilities include a small auditorium, gymnasium, music rooms, art rooms, industrial technology facilities, home economics facilities, special education facilities, and many science laboratories. The Senior High School hosts a student-run preschool, publishes a literary magazine called the Raider Review, and a monthly newspaper, the Seneca Scout, which also distributes a magazine at the end of the school year. In addition to the Seneca scout news paper there is a weekly broadcast news show by the same name produced in association with the school television station SVTV.

== Mascot ==
The Seneca Valley mascot is the Raider. In 2000, the school board passed a resolution not to remove the mascot. According to a district spokesperson, the mascot draws upon "the rich American Indian history of the area". On June 15, 2021, the school board decided to eliminate Native American imagery and the current mascot portrayal. However, the Raiders name is to be kept and a new mascot and branding is to be made.

== Football ==
The Seneca Valley Raiders football team has been in existence since the district's first year in 1967. Head coaches, Terry Henry 1984–1995, Rick Shepas 1996–1997, Mike Buchert 1998–2000, Bob Ceh 2001–2002, Ron Butschle came to the program after winning an A State Championship at Sto-Rox High School in 2003. Don Holl 2009 – 2014 Butshle has compiled a 15–32 record with a 5–15 section record over the last five seasons. Butshle resigned in 2008 giving the new head coaching job to Don Holl, the recent head coach of Erie Cathedral Prep High School where he amassed a 35–14 record in his tenure there. Since taking over the program in 2009, Don Holl has led the Raiders to a 35–18 record with 4 playoff victories in three seasons from 2011 to 2013. Butschle has since stepped back up to the head coach position.

== Notable alumni ==
- Jason Conti (1993) retired outfielder, Arizona Diamondbacks
- Zach Jackson (2001), pitcher, Cleveland Indians
- Peet Poillon (2005), midfielder, Denver Outlaws, Major League Lacrosse
- Kevan Smith (2006), catcher, Chicago White Sox, quarterback, University of Pittsburgh
- Brandon Fusco (2006), football player, selected in 2011 NFL draft by Minnesota Vikings
- Don Barclay (2007), offensive lineman for Green Bay Packers
- Cory Mazzoni (2008), pitcher in New York Mets organization
- Mike Weber (2005), defenseman, Washington Capitals
- C. J. Brown (2009), quarterback, University of Maryland
