= Murdering Town =

Lenni Lenape community of smaller villages

Coordinates: 40.788°N 80.032°W

Murdering Town (or Murthering Town) was a Lenni Lenape community that comprised several smaller villages along the Connoquenessing Creek and Breakneck Creek near present-day Harmony, and Evans City, Pennsylvania, United States. The village was located along the Venango Path which ran through what was then the Ohio Country during the French and Indian War. Today, the area is part of Western Pennsylvania.

== History ==
In 1753, George Washington passed through Murdering Town while on a mission to Fort Le Boeuf about six months before the French and Indian War began. On December 27, Washington, and his guide Christopher Gist, were shot at by a French allied Native just a few miles from the village. A stone marker was placed along PA 68 near Evans City, PA, describing the encounter with the native. The exact location of the shooting is unknown but is thought to be somewhere east of Evans City in Forward Township.

== Sources ==
- Novak, Michael, and Jana Novak, Washington's God, Basic Books, 2006, ISBN 0-465-05126-X.
- The Journals of George Washington and Christopher Gist: Mission to Fort Le Boeuf 1753-1754, Slippery Rock University, 2003.
