= Eidenau, Pennsylvania =

Unincorporated community in Pennsylvania, US

Coordinates: 40°47′30″N 80°05′45″W

Eidenau Sakonk Harmony Junction
- Unincorporated community
- Etymology: A Native American village
- Interactive map of Eidenau
- Country: United States
- State: Pennsylvania
- County: Butler
- Township: Jackson Township
- Time zone: UTC-5 (EST)
  - Summer (DST): UTC-4 (EDT)

Eidenau is an unincorporated community in Jackson Township, Butler County, Pennsylvania, United States.

== Geography ==
Eidenau is located in the area where Breakneck Creek flows into the Connoquenessing Creek. Pennsylvania Route 68 is the main road in Eidenau. Often, Eidenau is mistakenly called Harmony Junction. Harmony Junction is the name of the large railroad junction that connects the Buffalo and Pittsburgh Railroad's P&W Subdivision with the Northern Subdivision.

== History ==
The earliest known use of the name Eidenua is found in the journals of Christopher Gist. Gist and George Washington traveled through the area in December 1753 after leaving Fort LeBoeuf bound for Williamsburg, Virginia. After passing through Murdering Town they stumbled upon an area known as Sakonk. There they found a Native American that guided them down a wrong path, and attempted to kill them. His attempt failed, and the two men continued their journey south to the Allegheny River. Gist renamed Sakonk to Eidenau after his trek through the Ohio Country.

However, another source claims that the Harmony Society named Eidenau after a community in Württemberg, Germany. The Harmonites settled in this region, and constructed a large mill in the Connoquenessing Valley after a small Delaware tribe moved away in 1792. This tribe may have been from the village of Sakonk. The mill operated for about two decades, but eventually went out of business. Most of the twenty log houses surrounding the mill were also abandoned by 1814. Some of the relics from the mill and village are preserved at Historic Harmony in Harmony, Pennsylvania.

At the turn of the 20th century, a new cutoff was built by the Pittsburgh and Western Railroad to connect Eidenau with the community of Ribold which was just outside the city of Butler. This new route eliminated an older route that ran from Callery Junction to Ribold. The lines that run through the junction have changed hands several times. This is a list of the railroads that have used the junction from the P&W Railroad to the current B&P Railroad:

- Pittsburgh and Western Railroad
- Pittsburgh, Harmony, Butler and New Castle Railway (not a part of the junction itself, but passed alongside the ROW at certain points, now abandoned)
- Baltimore and Ohio Railroad (later under the management of the Chessie System)
- CSX Transportation
- Buffalo and Pittsburgh Railroad + Allegheny Valley Railroad (current)

The junction is a popular destination spot for railfans.
