= Lancaster, Pennsylvania (disambiguation) =

Lancaster, Pennsylvania could refer to:

- the city of Lancaster, Pennsylvania
  - Lancaster, Pennsylvania metropolitan area
- Lancaster County, Pennsylvania

== See also ==
- Lancaster Township, Lancaster County, Pennsylvania
- Lancaster Township, Butler County, Pennsylvania
