= Forward Township, Pennsylvania =

Forward Township is the name of some places in the U.S. state of Pennsylvania:

- Forward Township, Allegheny County, Pennsylvania
- Forward Township, Butler County, Pennsylvania
