= Forward Township =

Forward Township may refer to:

- Forward Township, Wells County, North Dakota, in Wells County, North Dakota
- Forward Township, Allegheny County, Pennsylvania
- Forward Township, Butler County, Pennsylvania
