= Don Barclay (American football) =

American football player (born 1989)

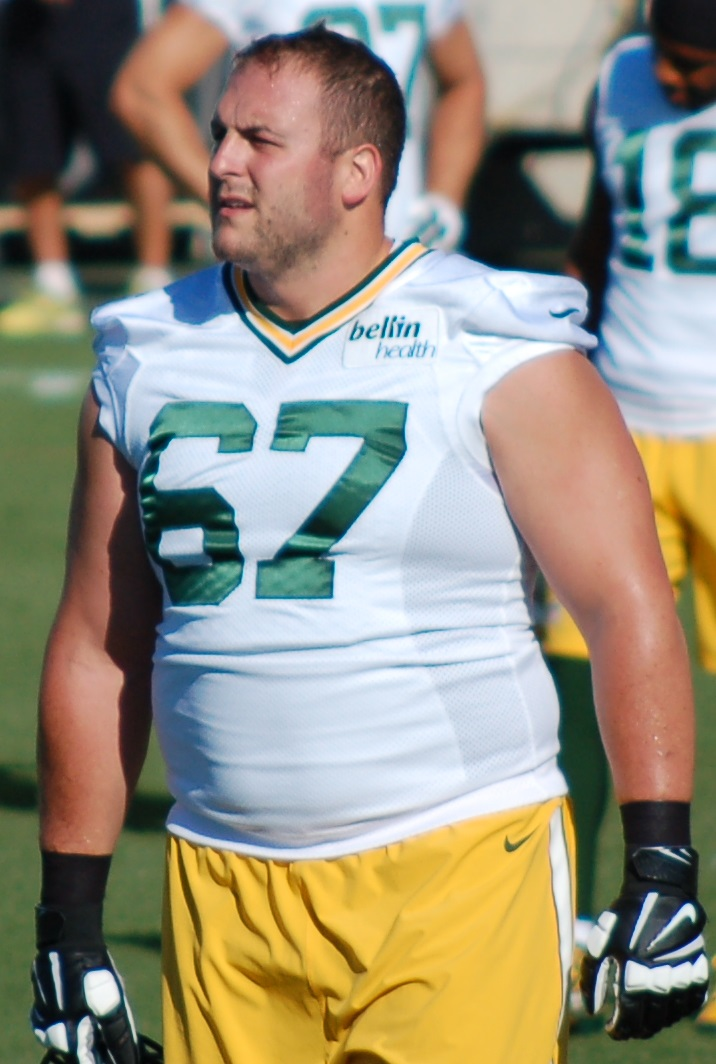
- Barclay with the Green Bay Packers in 2015

No. 67, 62
- Position: Offensive guard

Personal information
- Born: April 18, 1989 (age 37); Cranberry, Pennsylvania, U.S.
- Listed height: 6 ft 4 in (1.93 m)
- Listed weight: 305 lb (138 kg)

Career information
- High school: Seneca Valley (Harmony, Pennsylvania)
- College: West Virginia
- NFL draft: 2012: undrafted

Career history
- Green Bay Packers (2012–2017); Detroit Lions (2017); New Orleans Saints (2018)*; Denver Broncos (2019)*
- * Offseason or practice squad member only

Awards and highlights
- First-team All-Big East (2011); Second-team All-Big East (2010)

Career NFL statistics
- Games played: 65
- Games started: 25
- Fumble recoveries: 2
- Stats at Pro Football Reference

Donald Wayne Barclay III (born April 18, 1989) is an American former professional football player who was an offensive guard in the National Football League (NFL). He played college football for the West Virginia Mountaineers and was signed by the Green Bay Packers as an undrafted free agent in 2012.

== Early life and college ==
Barclay attended Seneca Valley Senior High School in Harmony, Pennsylvania.

At West Virginia University, he was a three-year starter at left tackle for the Mountaineers. He played in 52 games, and was named fourth-team All-America and first-team All-Big East in 2011 by Phil Steele’s College Football. He also earned second-team All-Big East after starting all 13 games as a junior.

== Professional career ==
Pre-draft measurables
| Height | Weight | 40-yard dash | 10-yard split | 20-yard split | 20-yard shuttle | Three-cone drill | Vertical jump | Broad jump | Bench press |
|---|---|---|---|---|---|---|---|---|---|
| 6 ft 3 7/8 in (1.93 m) | 305 lb (138 kg) | 5.03 s | 1.73 s | 2.88 s | 4.70 s | 7.54 s | 29.5 in (0.75 m) | 8 ft 7 in (2.62 m) | 13 reps |
All values from Pro Day

=== Green Bay Packers ===
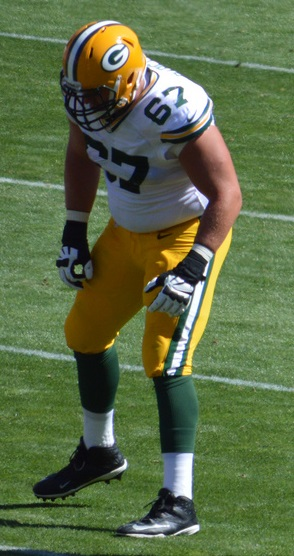
Barclay with Packers in 2013

After going undrafted in the 2012 NFL draft, Barclay signed with the Green Bay Packers on May 11, 2012. He earned a spot on the Packers' 53-man roster in 2012. He played in all 16 regular-season games, and started both of Green Bay’s postseason games at right tackle.

Barclay started 15 games for the Packers in 2013, including the NFC Wild Card Game.

Barclay suffered a knee injury in training camp and missed the entire 2014 season.

In 2015, Barclay played in all 16 regular-season games and made five starts. During a Week 16 game against the Arizona Cardinals, Barclay entered the game after David Bakhtiari was injured. However, he had one of the worst games of his career as he allowed four sacks, four QB hurries, and was penalized three times.

Barclay played in all 16 regular-season games and three postseason games in 2016.

On March 10, 2017, Barclay signed a one-year $1.3 million contract with the Packers. He was placed on injured reserve on September 3, 2017. He was released with an injury settlement on October 24, 2017.

=== Detroit Lions ===
On October 31, 2017, Barclay signed with the Detroit Lions. He was placed on injured reserve on December 26, 2017 with a concussion.

=== New Orleans Saints ===
On July 31, 2018, Barclay signed with the New Orleans Saints. He was released on September 1, 2018.

=== Denver Broncos ===
On January 22, 2019, Barclay signed a futures contract with the Denver Broncos. He was released on August 31, 2019.

== Personal life ==
Barclay appeared in the movie Pitch Perfect 2 along with then-teammates.

In February 2025, Barclay was named head football coach at his alma mater, Seneca Valley High School.
