= Brandon Fusco =

American football player (born 1988)

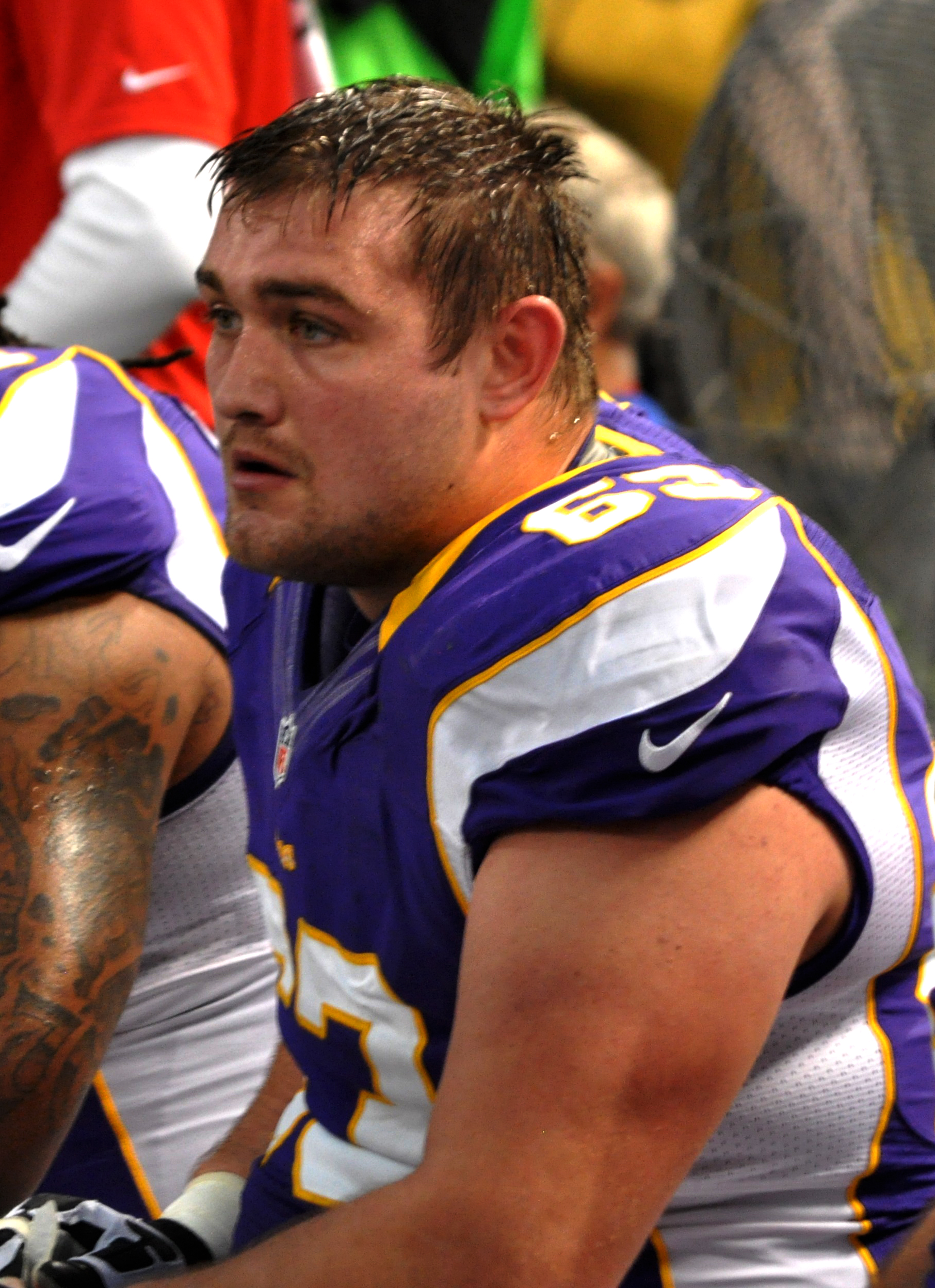
- Fusco with the Minnesota Vikings in 2012

Mississippi State Bulldogs
- Title: Offensive line analyst

Personal information
- Born: July 26, 1988 (age 38); Dayton, Ohio, U.S.
- Listed height: 6 ft 4 in (1.93 m)
- Listed weight: 306 lb (139 kg)

Career information
- High school: Seneca Valley (Harmony, Pennsylvania)
- College: Slippery Rock
- NFL draft: 2011: 6th round, 172nd overall pick

Career history

Playing
- Minnesota Vikings (2011–2016); San Francisco 49ers (2017); Atlanta Falcons (2018)

Coaching
- Mississippi State (2026–present) Offensive line analyst

Career NFL statistics
- Games played: 90
- Games started: 87
- Stats at Pro Football Reference

Brandon Fusco (born July 26, 1988) is an American former professional football player who was a guard in the National Football League (NFL). He was selected by the Minnesota Vikings in the sixth round of the 2011 NFL draft. He played college football at Slippery Rock University of Pennsylvania. He currently serves as an offensive line analyst at Mississippi State.

== Early life ==
Fusco attended Seneca Valley Senior High School in Harmony, Pennsylvania, where he played offensive tackle. He did not play football until his junior year at Seneca Valley, stating "Sophomore year, didn't really do nothing and football just kind of came to my attention. I always watched it on TV and I sometimes got into a ticked off mood so I wanted to get out on the field and take my frustrations out on people." Despite performing for a team that won just one of eighteen contests during his two varsity seasons, Fusco earned All-WPIAL Class AAA-1 and honorable mention Quad North All-Star honors. Fusco was also an honor roll student.

Fusco was not heavily recruited out of high school, mainly due to his lack of prep school experience and his 6–4, 240 lbs frame. He was only offered a chance to play football at small college schools, Youngstown State and Slippery Rock being the leading candidates. He eventually chose to enroll at Slippery Rock, stating that he felt very connected with the coaching staff.

== College career ==
After enrolling at Slippery Rock in 2006, Fusco spent his freshman season as a red shirt on the scout team, where he played offensive tackle. In 2007 spring drills, Fusco shifted to center. As a sophomore, Fusco received All-American honorable mention, All Super Region I and All Pennsylvania State Athletic Conference first-team honors. He started all eleven games at center, delivering ten touchdown-resulting blocks for a unit that rushed for 29 scores. His efforts help Slippery Rock rank second in the conference with an average of 484.14 yards per game.

Fusco received All-American, All-Region and All-PSAC first-team accolades as a junior. Named the team captain, he also received squad MVP honors. He led the PSAC Western Division with 98 knockdowns and eleven touchdown-resulting blocks, despite the team's lack of a strong aerial game that ranked 59th in the nation. It was his drive blocking skills that helped the team finish fifth nationally in rushing (239.54 ypg) and seventh in total offense (456.69 ypg).

He became the 19th player in school history to garner All-American first-team honors more than once in a career, as the 2010 Gene Upshaw Award winner and team captain captured All-PSAC honors for the third consecutive year. With a limited passing game, The Rock again relied on his drive blocking skills to place tenth in the Division II ranks with an average of 247.38 yards per game rushing. He capped off an excellent career by becoming the first player in school history to compete in the Senior Bowl.

== Professional career ==
=== Pre-draft ===
Pre-draft measurables
Height	Weight	Arm length	Hand span	Wingspan	40-yard dash	10-yard split	20-yard split	20-yard shuttle	Three-cone drill	Vertical jump	Broad jump	Bench press
6 ft 4 in (1.93 m)	306 lb (139 kg)	33 3/4 in (0.86 m)	10 in (0.25 m)	6 ft 8 1/8 in (2.04 m)	5.21 s	1.84 s	3.02 s	4.43 s	7.29 s	28.5 in (0.72 m)	9 ft 0 in (2.74 m)	26 reps
All values from NFL Combine

Along with Will Rackley, Ben Ijalana, and David Arkin, Fusco was considered one of the best small-school offensive line prospects.

=== Minnesota Vikings ===
After a strong performance at the Senior Bowl and the NFL Combine, Fusco was selected by the Minnesota Vikings in the sixth round, 172nd overall, in the 2011 NFL draft. He played in three games of his rookie campaign. During his second season he started all 16 regular season games.

On September 6, 2014, the Vikings signed Fusco to a five-year, $25 million contract extension.

On February 10, 2017, Fusco was released by the Vikings.

=== San Francisco 49ers ===
On May 2, 2017, Fusco was signed by the San Francisco 49ers. Fusco started all 16 games for the 49ers in 2017 at right guard, and the team averaged 3.9 yards per carry on runs behind him.

=== Atlanta Falcons ===
On March 14, 2018, Fusco signed a three-year contract with the Atlanta Falcons. He was named the Falcons' starting right guard to start the 2018 season, beating out incumbent starter Wes Schweitzer. He started the first seven games before suffering a season-ending ankle injury in Week 7.

On April 29, 2019, Fusco was released by the Falcons with a failed physical designation after one season while only playing and starting in seven games.

== Coaching career ==
On March 21, 2026, Fusco was hired as an offensive line analyst for the Mississippi State Bulldogs.
