= Watters, Pennsylvania =

Unincorporated community in Pennsylvania, US

- Unincorporated community
- Location within Pennsylvania
- Coordinates: 40°45′29″N 80°01′55″W
- Country: United States
- State: Pennsylvania
- County: Butler
- Township: Forward
- Elevation: 1,047 ft (319 m)
- Time zone: UTC-5 (Eastern (EST))
  - Summer (DST): UTC-4 (EDT)
- Area code: 724
- GNIS feature ID: 1190697

Watters is an unincorporated community located in Forward Township, Butler County, Pennsylvania, United States.
