= Pennsylvania Route 68 =

State highway in Pennsylvania, US

Pennsylvania Route 68

Route information
- Maintained by PennDOT
- Length: 90.036 mi (144.899 km)

Major junctions
- West end: SR 39 near Glasgow
- I-376 in Vanport; PA 51 in Bridgewater; PA 18 / PA 65 in Rochester; US 19 / PA 288 / PA 588 in Zelienople; I-79 near Harmony; PA 8 in Butler; US 422 near Butler; I-80 / PA 66 near Clarion
- East end: US 322 in Clarion

Location
- Country: United States
- State: Pennsylvania
- Counties: Beaver, Butler, Armstrong, Clarion

Highway system
- Pennsylvania State Route System; Interstate; US; State; Scenic; Legislative
← PA 67	→ PA 69

Pennsylvania Route 68 (PA 68) is a 90.036-mile-long (144.899 km) east–west state highway located in western Pennsylvania in the United States. The western terminus of the route is at the Ohio state line west of Glasgow, where PA 68 continues into Ohio as State Route 39 (SR 39). The eastern terminus is at U.S. Route 322 (US 322) in Clarion. The route runs southwest-northeast across Beaver, Butler, Armstrong, and Clarion counties. PA 68 follows the Ohio River between the Ohio border and Beaver, where it crosses the Beaver River into Rochester and heads northeast away from the Ohio River. The route runs through rural areas to Butler County, where it intersects Interstate 79 (I-79) in Zelienople before serving Evans City and Butler. PA 68 passes through a section of Armstrong County before crossing the Allegheny River into Clarion County. Here, the route passes through Rimersburg and Sligo before having an interchange with I-80 and continuing to its terminus in Clarion.

PA 68 was originally designated in 1927 to run from the Ohio border northeast to Clarion before continuing to US 6/US 120 in Kane. The route was extended northwest to PA 59 in Kinzua in 1935. The full length of the route was paved by 1940. The northern terminus was again moved to Kane in 1961, with PA 321 replacing most of the route north of there and the former northern terminus was inundated by the Allegheny Reservoir. The north end of PA 68 was cut back to its current location in 1970, with the road between Clarion and Kane becoming part of PA 66.

== Route description ==
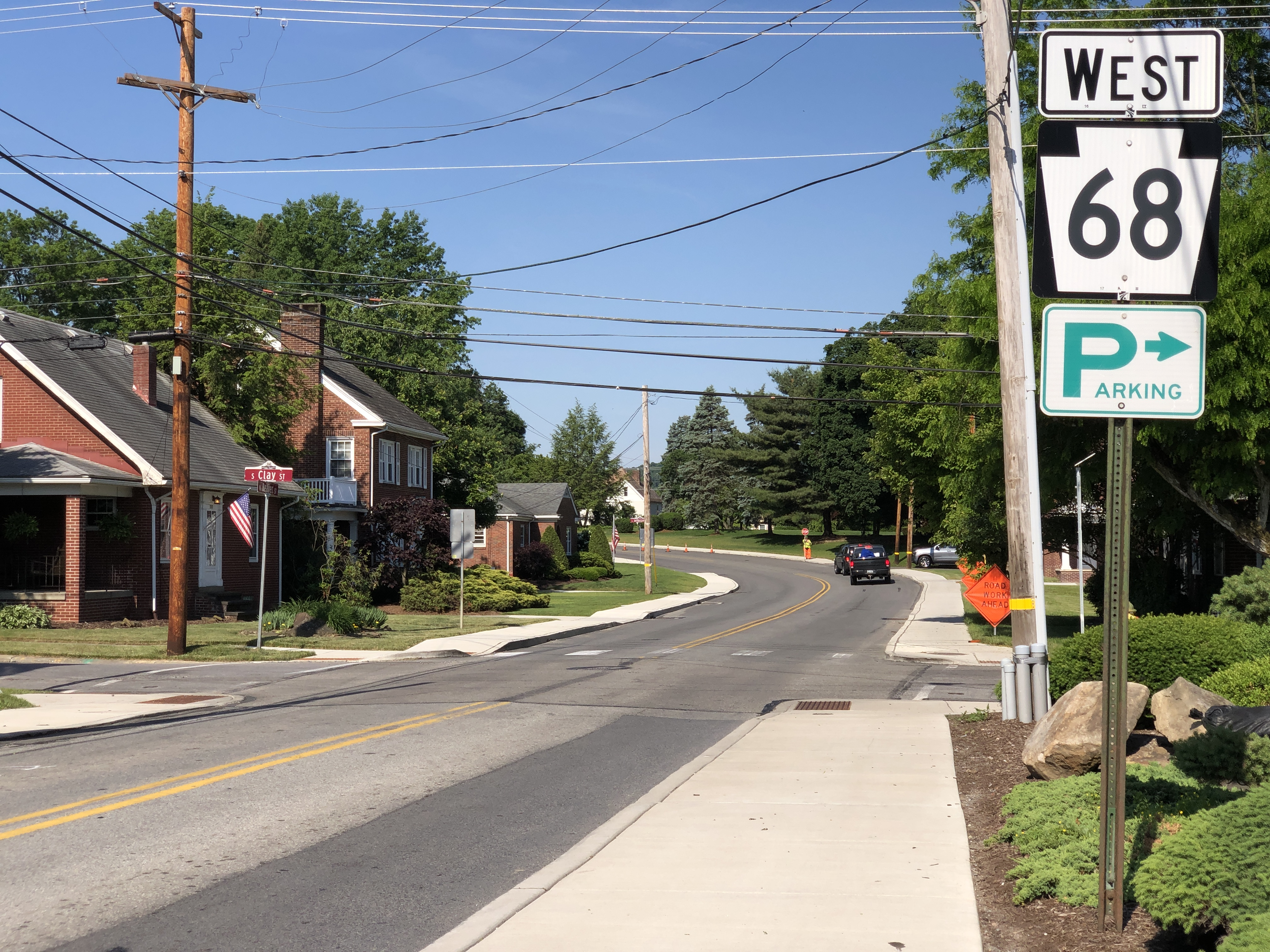
PA 68 westbound past US 19 in Zelienople

=== Beaver County ===
PA 68 begins at the Ohio border in the borough of Ohioville in Beaver County, where the road continues west into that state as SR 39. From the state line, the route heads east-northeast on two-lane undivided Midland Road, passing between wooded areas to the north and Norfolk Southern's Cleveland Line to the south with industrial areas and the Ohio River farther south. The road crosses the Little Beaver Creek into the borough of Glasgow and passes north of residential areas. PA 68 heads back into Ohioville and runs east through forested areas immediately to the north of the railroad tracks and the Ohio River. The road curves east-southeast and enters the borough of Midland, becoming Midland Avenue and passing homes. The route comes to an intersection with PA 168, where that route turns southeast to form a concurrency with PA 68, running through residential areas before heading through the commercial downtown of Midland. The road heads into industrial areas and becomes Midland Beaver Road, with PA 168 splitting to the south at an interchange to cross the Ohio River on the Shippingport Bridge.

Past this, PA 68 continues northeast through more forests with the Norfolk Southern line and the river to the southeast. The road heads into the borough of Industry, heading farther from the railroad line and the Ohio River. The route curves east past more homes, crossing over the Norfolk Southern line as it continues into more wooded areas. PA 68 turns northeast and runs between the railroad tracks to the northwest and the Ohio River to the southeast, crossing into Vanport Township and entering industrial areas as State Street. The road passes over the railroad tracks and runs past more commercial establishments before widening into a four-lane divided highway and coming to an interchange with I-376. After this interchange, the route becomes a two-lane undivided road again and continues through residential areas with some businesses. PA 68 becomes the border between Vanport Township to the north and the borough of Beaver to the south, where the name becomes 3rd Street. The road fully enters Beaver and runs through the commercial downtown. The route heads past homes before passing under CSX's Pittsburgh Subdivision railroad line and crossing into the borough of Bridgewater, where it reaches an interchange with PA 51. At this point, PA 68 heads east to form a concurrency with PA 51 on a four-lane divided highway, crossing the Beaver River into the borough of Rochester.

Here, the road passes over Norfolk Southern's Fort Wayne Line and comes to an interchange with PA 65, at which point PA 51 heads east along with PA 65. Here, PA 68 splits from PA 51 and heads onto two-lane undivided Adams Street, coming to a traffic circle with PA 18, which heads south and crosses the Ohio River on the Rochester–Monaca Bridge. The route continues through residential areas with some businesses. PA 68 turns northwest onto Virginia Avenue and passes more homes, becoming the border between Rochester to the west and Rochester Township to the east. The road fully enters Rochester Township and passes through North Rochester before turning northeast and becoming Sunflower Road. The route curves east and enters Daugherty Township, winding northeast through more rural areas of homes. PA 68 runs through more rural residential areas with some fields and woods, turning east before heading southeast into New Sewickley Township. The road reaches the community of Sunflower, turning northeast to run through more wooded areas with some farms and homes. The route passes through Unionville before passing under I-76 (Pennsylvania Turnpike) and intersecting the northern terminus of PA 989. PA 68 winds northeast through more farmland and woodland with some residences, crossing into Marion Township.

=== Butler County ===
PA 68 enters the borough of Zelienople in Butler County and becomes West Beaver Street, heading into residential areas. The road curves east and reaches an intersection with US 19, where PA 68 turns north to join that route on South Main Street, passing through the commercial downtown. The road intersects the eastern terminus of PA 288, where it becomes North Main Street, before PA 68 splits from US 19 by heading east on East Grandview Avenue. The route runs past homes, crossing into the borough of Harmony and becoming Evans City Road. PA 68 heads through residential and commercial areas a short distance to the south of Connoquenessing Creek and the P&W Subdivision railroad line, which is owned by CSX and operated by the Buffalo and Pittsburgh Railroad. The roadway crosses into Jackson Township and becoming a four-lane divided highway as it comes to an interchange with access to and from the southbound direction of I-79. The road becomes two lanes and undivided again as it continues southeast into wooded areas with some development, passing through Eidenau and Harmony Junction. The route continues to the southwest of the railroad tracks and Breakneck Creek, reaching an intersection with PA 528.

Here, PA 528 turns southeast to form a concurrency with PA 68. The road passes through woods before heading into the borough of Evans City, where it becomes West Main Street and runs past homes and businesses. The two routes curve to the east and cross the P&W Subdivision line and the Breakneck Creek into the commercial downtown of Evans City, becoming East Main Street. PA 528 splits from PA 68 by turning north onto Franklin Street and PA 68 passes more residences, turning to the northeast. The road enters Forward Township and becomes Evans City Road again, running through farmland and woodland with some residential and commercial buildings. The route passes over Connoquenessing Creek and the Buffalo and Pittsburgh Railroad's B&P Main Line Subdivision line, heading through woodland and turning north. PA 68 heads into farmland with some woods and residences, crossing into the borough of Connoquenessing, where it passes to the east of the residential center of town. The road heads into Connoquenessing Township and curves northeast, running through more agricultural and wooded areas with a few homes. The route passes through increasing areas of residential and commercial development, heading north of Butler Farm Show Airport before continuing into Butler Township. Here, PA 68 curves east and heads past more areas of housing, coming to an intersection with PA 356.

Here, PA 68 heads southeast along with PA 356 on New Castle Road, a three-lane road with a center left-turn lane that runs through wooded areas and commercial development. The road enters the city of Butler and becomes New Castle Street, running through residential areas with some businesses. PA 68/PA 356 heads east onto West Cunningham Street before splitting into a one-way pair, with eastbound PA 68/southbound PA 356 following West Cunningham Street and westbound PA 68/northbound PA 356 following West Jefferson Street. The two routes head into the commercial downtown of Butler, coming to an intersection with PA 8 at which point PA 356 splits from PA 68 by heading south along that route. The one-way pair carrying PA 68 becomes East Cunningham Street eastbound and East Jefferson Street westbound, with eastbound PA 68 turning north onto South McKean Street to rejoin westbound PA 68 on two-way East Jefferson Street. The road heads east through commercial areas with some homes, turning northeast into residential areas as it becomes the border between Butler to the northwest and Butler Township to the southeast. The route fully enters Butler Township again as it passes near Butler Memorial Hospital before coming to a bridge that carries the route over the Canadian National's Bessemer Subdivision railroad line, a Buffalo and Pittsburgh Railroad line, and Connoquenessing Creek, crossing into Summit Township. PA 68 comes to an interchange with the US 422 freeway, where it also intersects the southern terminus of PA 38; here, the road is a four-lane divided highway.

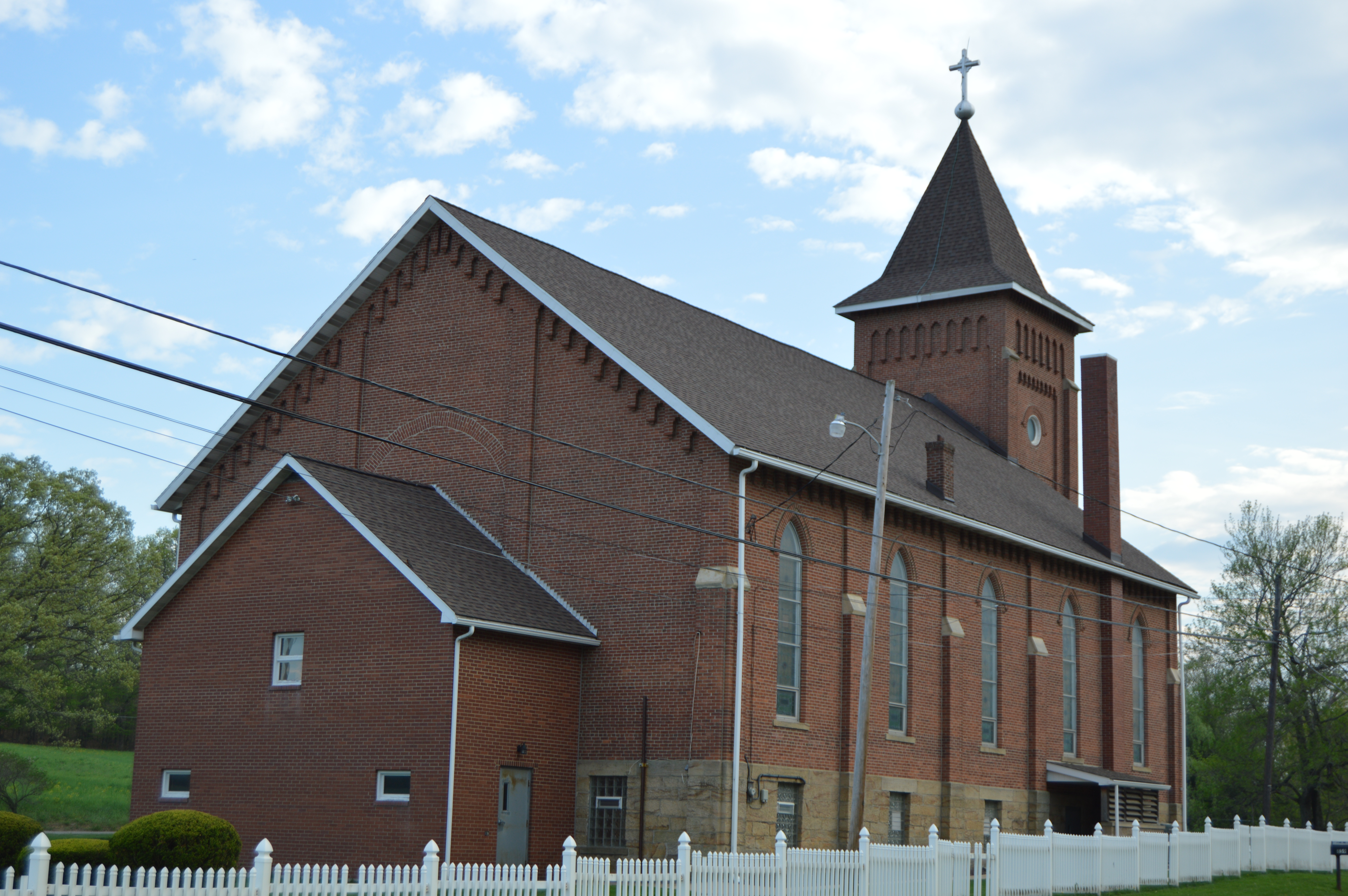
St. Joseph's Church on PA 68 in North Oakland

Past this, the road becomes two lanes and undivided, with the name becoming Chicora Road as it enters wooded areas with some homes. The route heads into a mix of farms and woods with some residences as it crosses into Oakland Township. PA 68 winds northeast through more wooded areas with some homes, passing through Woodbine. The road runs through more farmland and woodland with scattered residences, heading through North Oakland. The route crosses into Donegal Township and turns north, at which point it begins to run to the west of the Buffalo and Pittsburgh Railroad's Northern Subdivision line. PA 68 curves northeast and east, heading into the borough of Chicora and crossing under the railroad tracks. The road curves northeast and becomes South Main Street, passing homes before becoming North Main Street in the center of town, where it passes a few businesses. After running past more residences, the route curves northeast and crosses into Fairview Township, becoming Chicora Road again and winding through agricultural and wooded areas with some homes. The road turns east and crosses PA 268 in Kepples Corners.

=== Armstrong and Clarion counties ===
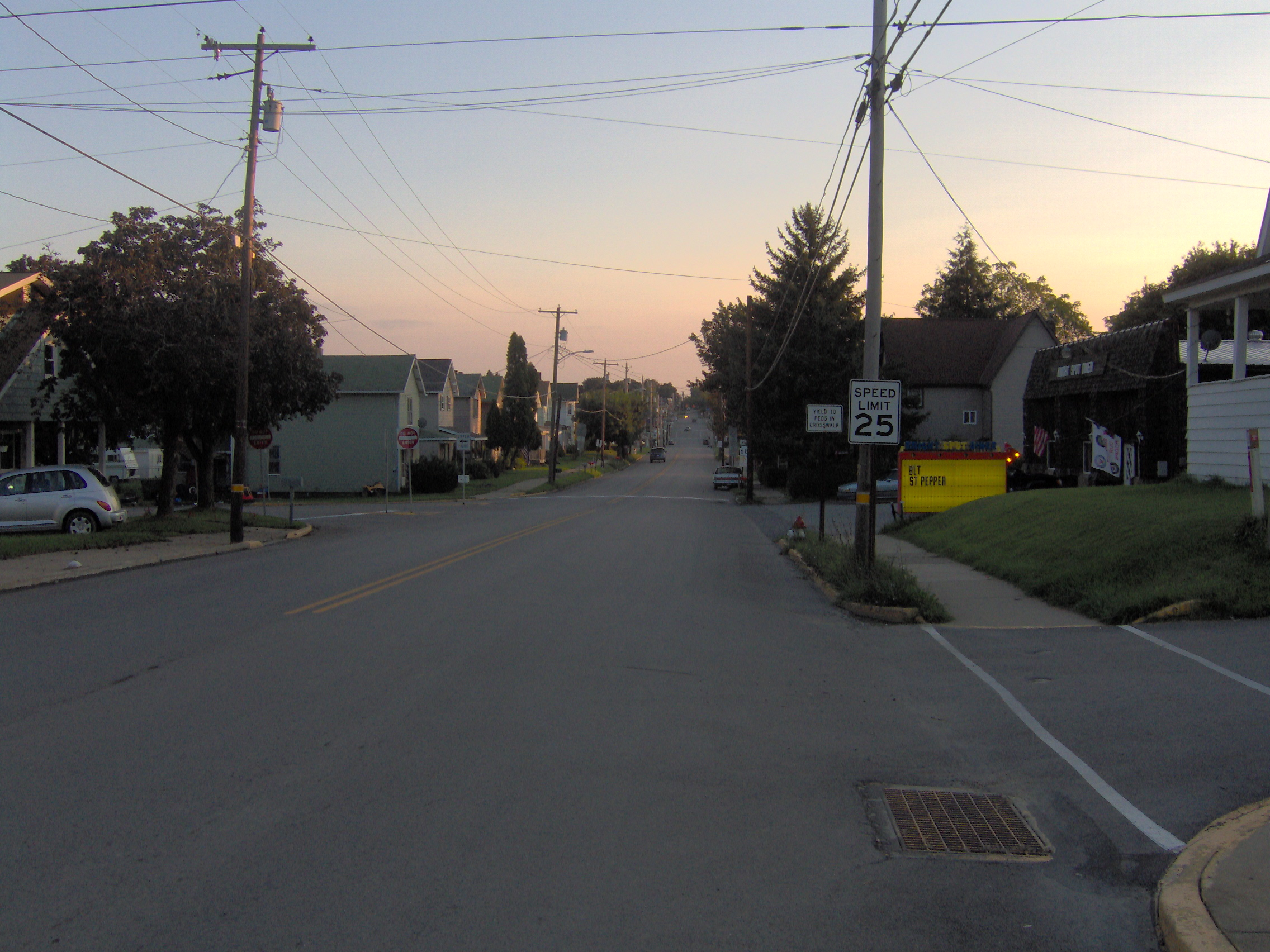
PA 68 westbound in Rimersburg

PA 68 heads into Bradys Bend Township in Armstrong County and becomes an unnamed road, heading through forested areas with some homes, passing through Kaylor. The road turns east before a curve to the north, coming to the residential community of Brady's Bend. Past this, the route turns southeast through more forests.

PA 68 crosses the Allegheny River into the borough of East Brady in Clarion County, becoming Bridge Street. The route turns southwest onto Kellys Way and passes homes with some businesses. PA 68 turns southeast onto 3rd Street and runs through residential areas before curving east as Simpson Road and heading through wooded areas. The road enters Brady Township and runs northeast through more woodland with some fields and homes. The route continues into Madison Township and runs through more rural areas, passing through New Athens and Maple Grove. PA 68 heads into the borough of Rimersburg and becomes Main Street, passing homes. The road intersects the western terminus of PA 861, where it becomes the border between Rimersburg to the west and Toby Township to the east before fully entering Toby Township and passing through Rimersburg Station.

The route becomes unnamed as it passes through wooded areas with some farm fields and homes, heading to the north. PA 68 briefly heads through Piney Township before entering the borough of Sligo and passing homes on Colerain Street. The route intersects the eastern terminus of PA 58 and turns east onto Front Street, running past more residences. The road heads back into Piney Township and becomes unnamed, continuing through agricultural areas with some woods and homes, turning northeast into Monroe Township. The route runs through more farmland and woodland with some residences, turning north and heading through Reidsburg, where it crosses an abandoned railroad line and Piney Creek. PA 68 runs north through more rural areas before passing through Williamsburg and becoming a four-lane divided highway as it reaches an interchange with I-80/PA 66. Past this, the road heads through business areas and passes east of the Clarion Mall before becoming undivided and heading into wooded areas with some homes in Clarion Township as South 5th Avenue. PA 68 enters the borough of Clarion and runs north-northeast past more residences before ending at US 322 in the commercial downtown.

== History ==
When Pennsylvania first legislated routes in 1911, what would become PA 68 was designated as Legislative Route 243 between the Ohio border and Rochester, Legislative Route 78 between Rochester and Butler, Legislative Route 214 between Butler and Clarion, and Legislative Route 98 in a portion of Forest County. PA 68 was designated in 1927 to run from the Ohio border in Beaver County northeast to US 6/US 119/US 120/PA 6/PA 7 in Kane, running along its current routing to Clarion before continuing to Kane. At this time, the entire route was paved between the Ohio border and Clarion except for a portion between Rimersburg and Sligo. Between Clarion and Kane, the entire route was unpaved except for a portion near Marienville and to the southwest of Kane. A year later, the route between Rimersburg and Sligo was paved. By 1930, PA 68 paved between US 322 northwest of Clarion and Paint Mills, Arthurs and Snydersburg, and around Leeper while the state highway was under construction between Paint Mills and Arthurs, Snydersburg and southwest of Leeper, and the Clarion/Forest county line and Roses.

In the 1930s, the entire length of the route between Clarion and Kane was paved. PA 68 was extended northwest from Kane along a paved road to PA 59 in Kinzua in 1935. In 1961, the Pennsylvania Department of Highways approved moving the northern terminus of PA 68 to US 6 in Kane, with PA 321 replacing much of the route north of Kane. The former northern terminus at PA 59 in Kinzua was inundated with the creation of the Allegheny Reservoir. In 1970, the north end of PA 68 was cut back to its current location at US 322 in Clarion, with the route between US 322 northwest of Clarion and US 6 in Kane replaced by a rerouted PA 66. This change was made to keep truck traffic away from the Toby Bridge, which had a 15-ton weight limit and collapsed from an incident with a truck in 1969. Northbound trucks were instead directed to follow I-80 and PA 66 to avoid the bridge along the former PA 68 alignment.

== Major intersections ==
County	Location	mi	km	Destinations	Notes
Beaver	Ohioville	0.000	0.000	SR 39 west (Harvey Avenue) – East Liverpool	Western terminus of PA 68 at Ohio state line
Beaver	Midland	2.975	4.788	PA 168 north (Beaver Road)	Western end of PA 168 concurrency
Beaver	Industry	4.840	7.789	PA 168 south (Shippingport Bridge) – Shippingport, Hookstown	Interchange; eastern end of PA 168 concurrency
Beaver	Vanport Township	11.617	18.696	I-376 (Beaver Valley Expressway) – Pittsburgh, New Castle	Exit 38 (I-376)
Beaver	Bridgewater	13.880	22.338	PA 51 north (Constitution Boulevard) – Chippewa	Interchange; western end of PA 51 concurrency
Beaver	Rochester	14.208	22.866	PA 51 south / PA 65 (Ohio River Boulevard) – Pittsburgh, New Brighton, Beaver Falls	Interchange; eastern end of PA 51 concurrency
Beaver	Rochester	14.381	23.144	PA 18 (Brighton Avenue/Rhode Island Avenue)	Traffic circle
Beaver	New Sewickley Township	21.874	35.203	PA 989 south (Glen Eden Road)	Northern terminus of PA 989
Butler	Zelienople	26.777	43.093	US 19 south (Main Street) / Beaver Street – Pittsburgh	Western end of US 19 concurrency
Butler	Zelienople	27.000	43.452	PA 288 west / PA 588 west (New Castle Street) – Ellwood City, Beaver Falls	Eastern terminus of PA 288 / PA 588
Butler	Zelienople	27.095	43.605	US 19 north (Main Street) to I-79 north / Grandview Street – Portersville, Erie	Eastern end of US 19 concurrency
Butler	Jackson Township	28.203– 28.220	45.388– 45.416	I-79 south – Pittsburgh	Exit 87 (I-79); I-79 southbound entrance / northbound exit only
Butler	Jackson Township	31.308	50.385	PA 528 south (Lindsay Road)	Western end of PA 528 concurrency
Butler	Evans City	32.188	51.802	PA 528 north (Franklin Street)	Western end of PA 528 concurrency
Butler	Butler Township	42.993	69.191	PA 356 north (New Castle Road)	Western end of PA 356 concurrency
Butler	Butler	44.695	71.930	PA 8 / PA 356 south (Main Street)	Eastern end of PA 356 concurrency
Butler	Summit Township	46.414– 46.500	74.696– 74.834	US 422 (Benjamin Franklin Highway) / PA 38 north (Oneida Valley Road) – Kittanning, New Castle, Eau Claire	Interchange; southern terminus of PA 38
Butler	Fairview Township	58.890	94.774	PA 268 (Keeples Corner Road) – Parker, Kittanning	
Armstrong	No major junctions				
Clarion	Rimersburg	74.423	119.772	PA 861 east – New Bethlehem	Western terminus of PA 861
Clarion	Sligo	79.094	127.289	PA 58 west (Bald Eagle Street) / Colerain Street – Parker	Eastern terminus of PA 58
Clarion	Monroe Township	87.885	141.437	I-80 / PA 66 – DuBois, Sharon	Exit 62 (I-80)
Clarion	Clarion	90.036	144.899	US 322 (Main Street) – Franklin, Brookville	Eastern terminus of PA 68
1.000 mi = 1.609 km; 1.000 km = 0.621 mi: Concurrency terminus; Incomplete access

== PA 68 Truck ==
Pennsylvania Route 68 Truck
- Location: Beaver County, Pennsylvania
- Length: 3.3 mi (5.3 km)

Pennsylvania Route 68 Truck is a connector truck route that directs motorists to PA 68 while avoiding PA 989. Trucks are advised to follow Big Knob Road to avoid a 10 ton weight limit on PA 989 north of this intersection.
