= Wahlville, Pennsylvania =

Unincorporated community in Pennsylvania, U.S.

Coordinates: 40°48′19″N 80°03′16″W

Wahlville is an unincorporated community located in southwestern Butler County, Pennsylvania, United States, with the total population of around 25 people. It is in the northwestern corner of Forward Township. It had two coal mines and three bridges to enter it.
