= Ron Kline =

American baseball player (1932–2002)

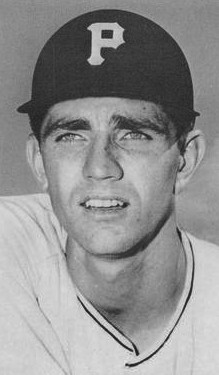
- Kline in 1957
- Pitcher
- Born: March 9, 1932; Callery, Pennsylvania, U.S.
- Died: June 22, 2002 (aged 70); Callery, Pennsylvania, U.S.
- Batted: Right Threw: Right

MLB debut
- April 21, 1952, for the Pittsburgh Pirates

Last MLB appearance
- June 13, 1970, for the Atlanta Braves

MLB statistics
- Win–loss record: 114–144
- Earned run average: 3.75
- Strikeouts: 989
- Saves: 108
- Stats at Baseball Reference

Teams
- Pittsburgh Pirates (1952, 1955–1959); St. Louis Cardinals (1960); Los Angeles Angels (1961); Detroit Tigers (1961–1962); Washington Senators (1963–1966); Minnesota Twins (1967); Pittsburgh Pirates (1968–1969); San Francisco Giants (1969); Boston Red Sox (1969); Atlanta Braves (1970)

Ronald Lee Kline (March 9, 1932 – June 22, 2002) was an American professional baseball player.

He played in Major League Baseball as a right-handed pitcher over parts of seventeen seasons (1952, 1955–1970) with the Pittsburgh Pirates, St. Louis Cardinals, Los Angeles Angels, Detroit Tigers, Washington Senators, Minnesota Twins, San Francisco Giants, Boston Red Sox and Atlanta Braves. For his career, he compiled a 114–144 record in 736 appearances, most as a relief pitcher, with a 3.75 earned run average and 989 strikeouts.

== Biography ==
Kline missed the 1953–1954 baseball seasons due to military service.

Kline was born in Callery, Pennsylvania, and returned there to serve as mayor after leaving baseball.

== Death ==
Kline died in Callery in June 2002 at the age of seventy. He had heart and kidney problems at the time of his death.

== See also ==
- List of Major League Baseball annual saves leaders
