= Jackson Township, Butler County, Pennsylvania =

Township in Pennsylvania, US

Coordinates: 40°46′57″N 80°06′13″W

- Township
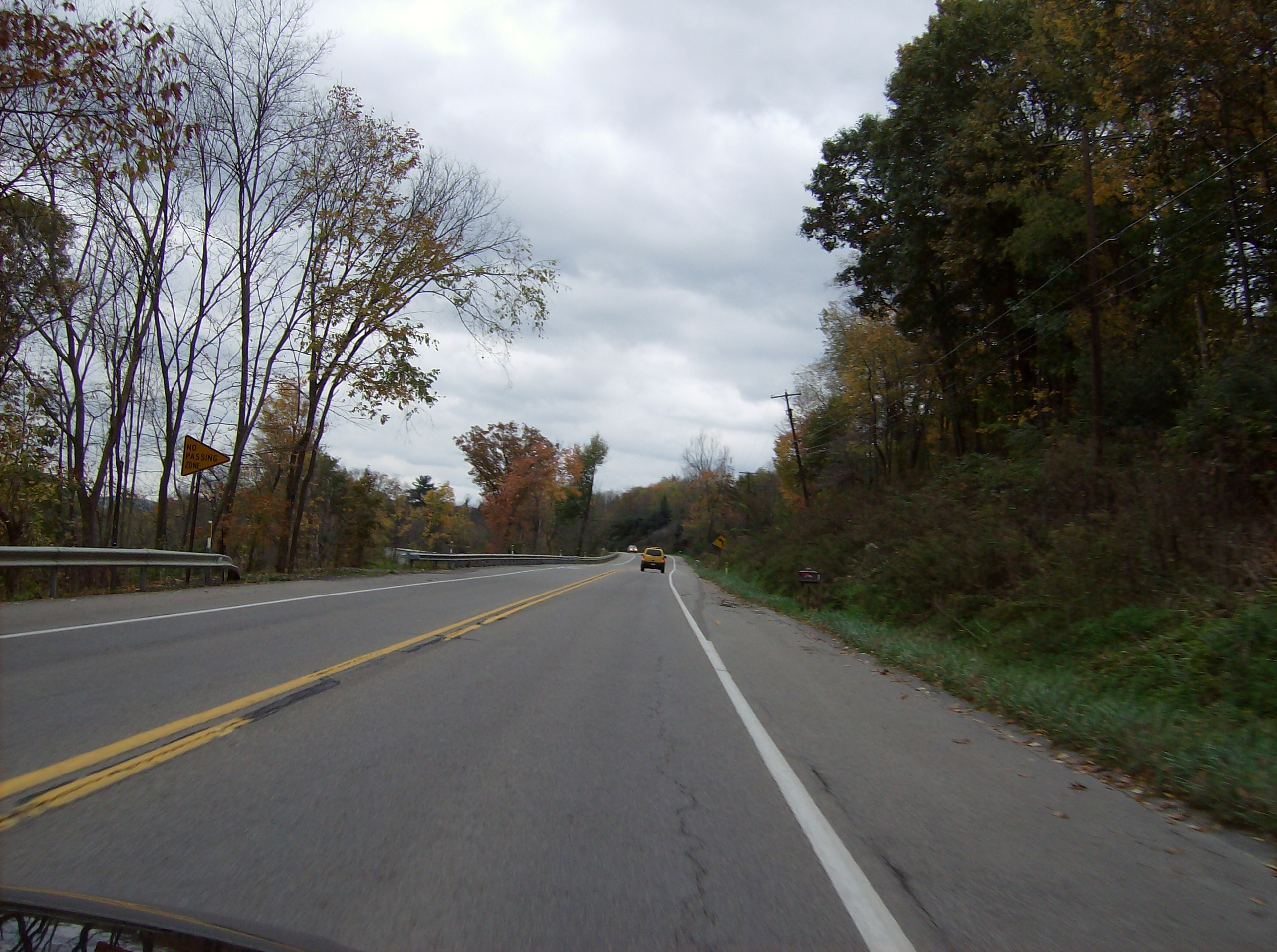
- Along Route 68 in Jackson Township

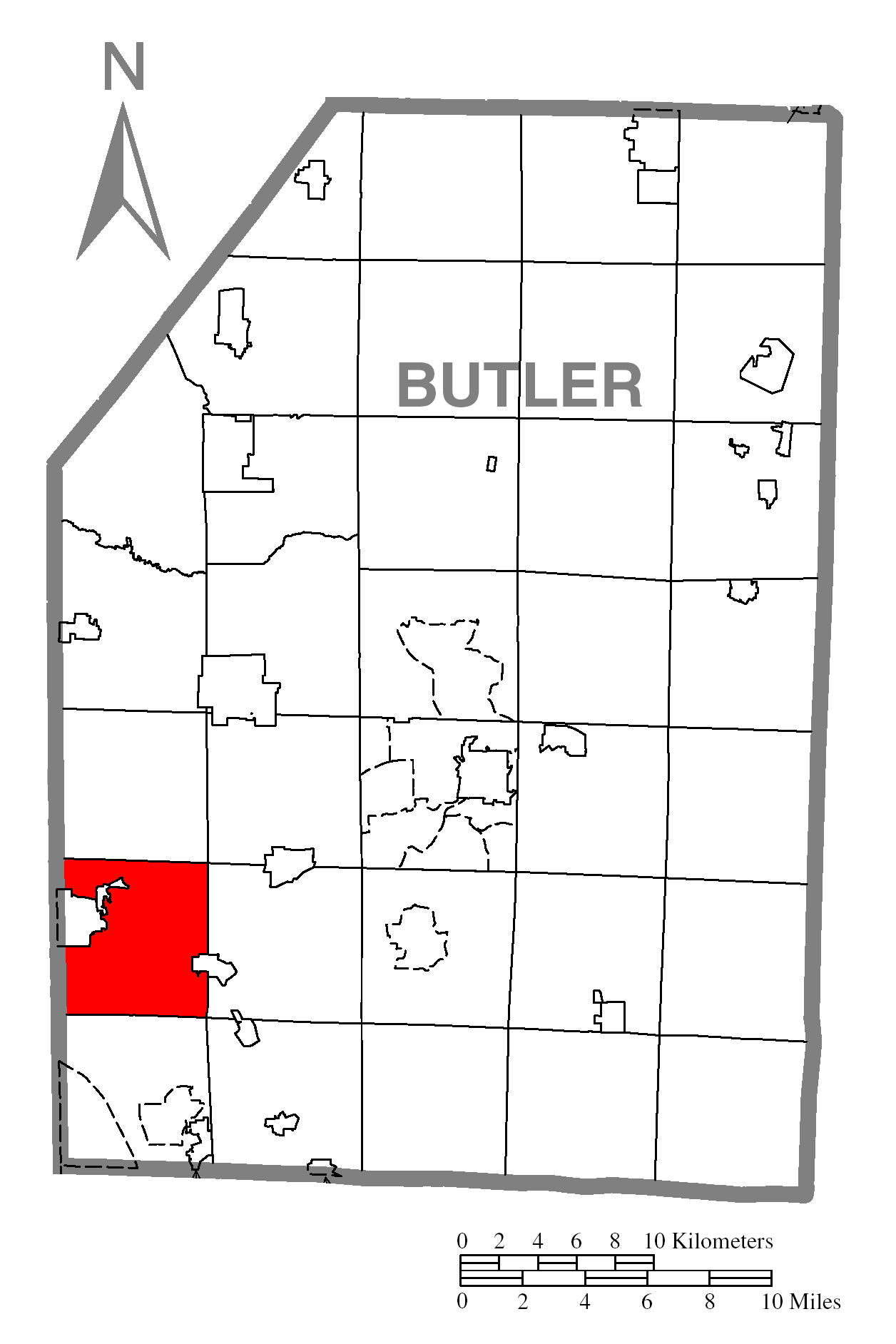
- Map of Butler County, Pennsylvania, highlighting Jackson Township

- Map of Butler County, Pennsylvania
- Country: United States
- State: Pennsylvania
- County: Butler
- Settled: 1797
- Incorporated: 1854

Area
  - Total: 21.73 sq mi (56.28 km^{2})
  - Land: 21.69 sq mi (56.18 km^{2})
  - Water: 0.039 sq mi (0.10 km^{2})

Population (2020)
  - Total: 4,885
  - Estimate (2022): 5,595
  - Density: 175.5/sq mi (67.78/km^{2})
- Time zone: UTC-5 (Eastern (EST))
  - Summer (DST): UTC-4 (EDT)
- FIPS code: 42-019-37344
- Website: www.jackson-township.com

Jackson Township is an American township which is located in Butler County, Pennsylvania. The population was 4,885 at the time of the 2020 census.

== Geography ==
Jackson Township is located in southwestern Butler County, with Beaver County to the west. The boroughs of Zelienople and Harmony are located in, but separate from, the western part of the township. The borough of Evans City lies along part of the township's eastern border but is also separate from the township. The unincorporated community of Eidenau is east of Harmony.

Connoquenessing Creek, a tributary of the Beaver River, flows from east to west through the northern part of the township.

According to the United States Census Bureau, the township has a total area of 21.7 square miles (56.3 km^{2}), of which 0.04 square miles (0.1 km^{2}), or 0.17%, is water.

== History ==
European settlers began arriving along Breakneck Creek, a tributary of the Connoquenessing, circa 1800. Around the same time, present-day Zelienople and Harmony were settled. Among the first settlers in the area were James Magee (born in County Down, present-day Northern Ireland, in 1769) in the Connoquenessing Valley in 1797 and William Martin (born in Ireland) along Breakneck Creek. The Harmony Society also made its first settlement in the United States in present-day Jackson Township.

Jackson Township was ultimately formed from parts of Cranberry Township and Connoquenessing Township in 1854. Early industries in the area included coal, iron ore, and limestone extraction, timber production, and farming on the low-lying, flatter areas of the Connoquenessing Valley, where the fertility of the soil was conducive to it.

== Demographics ==
Historical population
Census	Pop.	Note	%±
1970	2,444		—
1980	2,441		−0.1%
1990	3,078		26.1%
2000	3,645		18.4%
2010	3,657		0.3%
2020	4,885		33.6%
2022 (est.)	5,595		14.5%
U.S. Decennial Census

As of the 2000 census, there were 3,645 people, 1,358 households, and 1,029 families residing in the township.

The population density was 172.2 inhabitants per square mile (66.5/km^{2}). There were 1,439 housing units at an average density of 68.0 per square mile (26.3/km^{2}).

The racial makeup of the township was 98.02% White, 0.91% African American, 0.08% Native American, 0.27% Asian, 0.16% from other races, and 0.55% from two or more races. Hispanic or Latino of any race were 0.30% of the population.

There were 1,358 households, out of which 30.2% had children under the age of eighteen living with them; 64.9% were married couples living together, 8.6% had a female householder with no husband present, and 24.2% were non-families. 20.3% of all households were made up of individuals, and 6.4% had someone living alone who was sixty-five years of age or older.

The average household size was 2.60 and the average family size was 3.01.

In the township, the population was spread out, with 22.5% under the age of eighteen, 7.0% from eighteen to twenty-four, 28.6% from twenty-five to forty-four, 25.4% from forty-five to sixty-four, and 16.5% who were sixty-five years of age or older. The median age was forty-one years.

For every one hundred females, there were 95.7 males. For every one hundred females who were aged eighteen or older, there were 92.9 males.

The median income for a household in the township was $46,992, and the median income for a family was $53,710. Males had a median income of $42,531 compared with that of $25,987 for females.

The per capita income for the township was $23,141.

Roughly 5.0% of families and 8.3% of the population were living below the poverty line, including 16.4% of those who were under the age of eighteen and 7.5% of those who were aged sixty-five or older.

== Economy ==
In September 2014, a regional distribution center for FedEx was proposed. FedEx committed to the facility in November 2014, for completion in 2016.
