= Callery, Pennsylvania =

Borough in Pennsylvania, US

- Borough
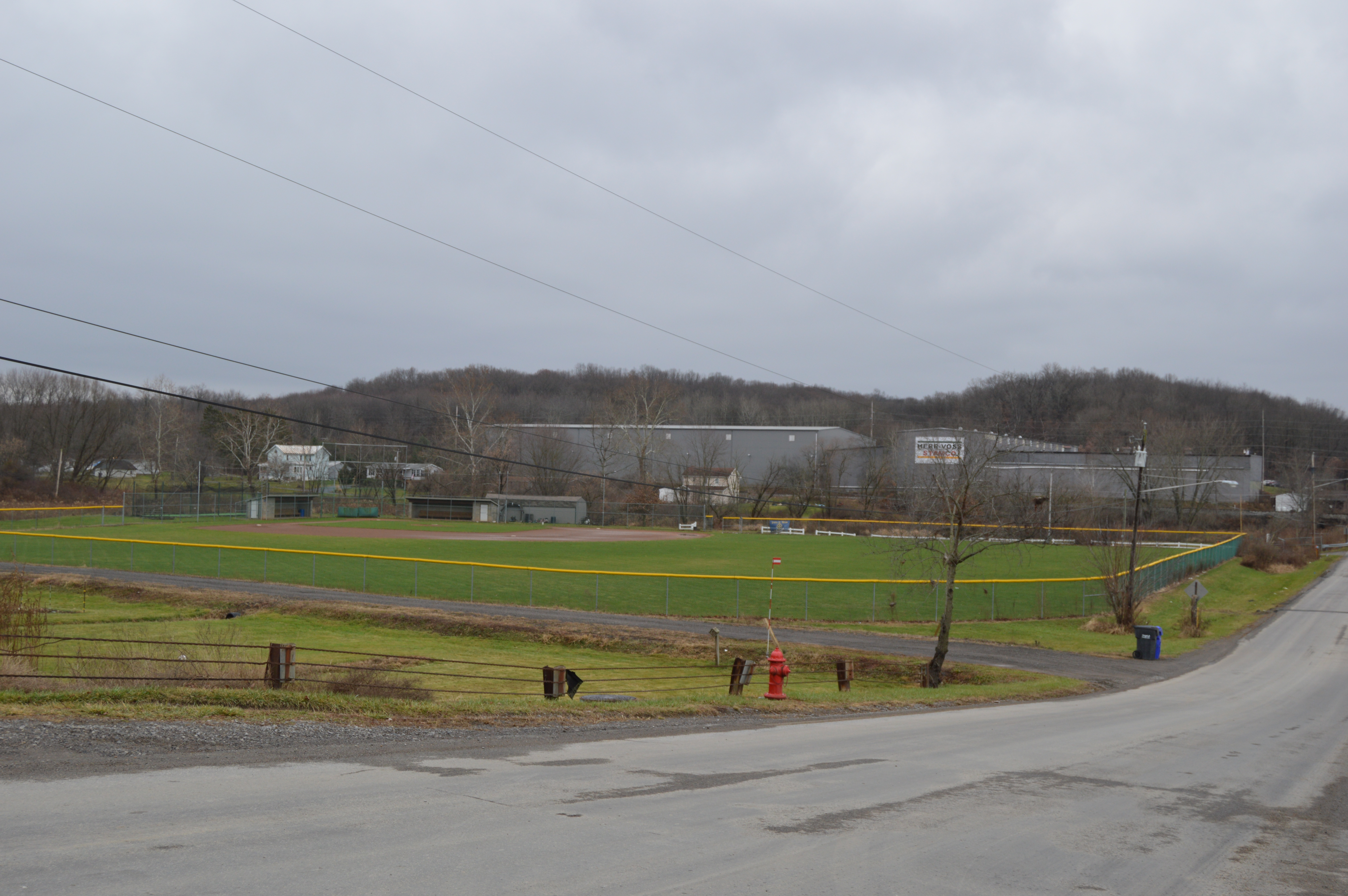
- Baseball field and ANDRITZ Herr-Voss Stamco Factory

- Location of Callery in Butler County, Pennsylvania.

- Location of Callery in Pennsylvania
- Coordinates: 40°44′23″N 80°2′14″W
- Country: United States
- State: Pennsylvania
- County: Butler
- Settled: 1880

Area
  - Total: 0.54 sq mi (1.39 km^{2})
  - Land: 0.54 sq mi (1.39 km^{2})
  - Water: 0 sq mi (0.00 km^{2})

Population (2020)
  - Total: 364
  - Density: 678.4/sq mi (261.92/km^{2})
- Time zone: UTC-5 (EST)
  - Summer (DST): UTC-4 (EDT)
- ZIP code: 16024
- Area code: 724
- Website: www.calleryborough.com

Callery is a borough in Butler County, Pennsylvania, United States. As of the 2020 census, Callery had a population of 364.

== Geography ==
Callery is located in the northwestern corner of Adams Township in southwestern Butler County, at 40°44′23″N 80°2′14″W (40.739587, −80.037211). It is 3.7 miles (6.0 km) northwest of Mars and 2.8 miles (4.5 km) southeast of Evans City; all three boroughs are in the valley of Breakneck Creek.

According to the United States Census Bureau, the borough has a total area of 0.54 square miles (1.4 km^{2}), all land.

== Demographics ==
Historical population
Census	Pop.	Note	%±
1910	335		—
1920	318		−5.1%
1930	330		3.8%
1940	354		7.3%
1950	407		15.0%
1960	419		2.9%
1970	416		−0.7%
1980	415		−0.2%
1990	420		1.2%
2000	444		5.7%
2010	394		−11.3%
2020	364		−7.6%

As of the 2000 census, there were 444 people, 157 households, and 121 families residing in the borough. The population density was 838.1 inhabitants per square mile (323.6/km^{2}). There were 164 housing units at an average density of 309.6 per square mile (119.5/km^{2}). The racial makeup of the borough was 99.10% White, and 0.90% from two or more races.

There were 157 households, out of which 43.3% had children under the age of 18 living with them, 62.4% were married couples living together, 11.5% had a female householder with no husband present, and 22.3% were non-families. 18.5% of all households were made up of individuals, and 8.3% had someone living alone who was 65 years of age or older. The average household size was 2.83 and the average family size was 3.25.

In the borough the population was spread out, with 30.4% under the age of 18, 8.1% from 18 to 24, 32.7% from 25 to 44, 20.3% from 45 to 64, and 8.6% who were 65 years of age or older. The median age was 34 years. For every 100 females there were 96.5 males. For every 100 females age 18 and over, there were 98.1 males.

The median income for a household in the borough was $42,308, and the median income for a family was $44,091. Males had a median income of $35,000 versus $22,679 for females. The per capita income for the borough was $16,049. About 2.3% of families and 2.5% of the population were below the poverty line, including 0.9% of those under age 18 and 5.7% of those age 65 or over.

== History ==
Callery was established in 1880, with the post office opening in 1884. Most of the community was lost to a fire in 1892; however, with the area being a major rail hub, many of the structures were rebuilt. The community was incorporated into a borough in 1905.

=== Railroad center ===
Located along the P&W Subdivision, the borough was originally a small whistle stop on the Pittsburgh and Western Railroad. However, by the turn of the 20th century, Callery became a prosperous railroad community with the completion of the Northern Subdivision, which connected with the P&W line in Callery. The Northern Subdivision ran from the junction to the village of Ribold outside of Butler. This new connection turned Callery into a major hub for the B&O Railroad, and for the next three decades it would be called Callery Junction. By the 1930s, a new connection was completed at Eidenau which eliminated the sharp curves and grades to Ribold. Soon after, traffic on the old connection ceased, and Callery Junction was no more. Trains from the Buffalo and Pittsburgh Railroad still pass the small borough today, but the junction has been gone for almost eighty years.

== Education ==
It is in the Seneca Valley School District.

== Notable person ==
- Ron Kline, pitcher, primarily in relief, for Pittsburgh Pirates and numerous other teams
