= Breakneck Creek =

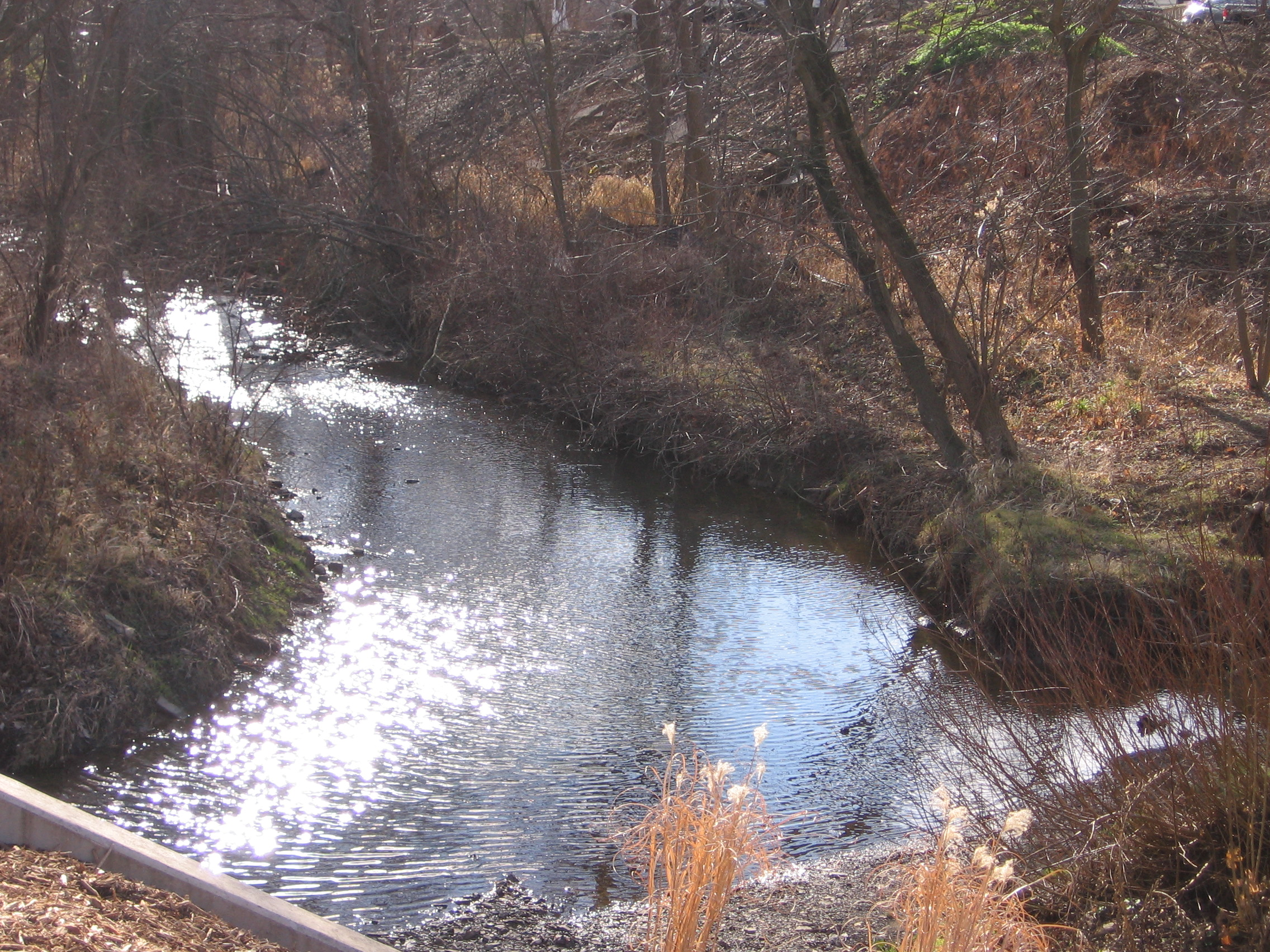
- Breakneck Creek seen from a bridge in Mars, Pennsylvania.

Location
- Country: United States of America
- State: Pennsylvania
- Cities: Valencia, PA, Mars, PA, Callery, PA, Evans City, PA

Physical characteristics
- Source: Bakerstown Hill
  - location: Bakerstown, Allegheny County, Pennsylvania
  - coordinates: 40°39′38″N 79°58′36″W
  - elevation: 1,290 ft (390 m)
- Mouth: Connoquenessing Creek
  - location: Eidenau, Butler County, Pennsylvania
  - coordinates: 40°47′51″N 80°05′52″W
  - elevation: 902 ft (275 m)

Basin features
- Progression: Connoquenessing Creek → Beaver River → Ohio River → Mississippi River → Gulf of Mexico
- Tributaries
  - left: Kaufman Run, Wolfe Run

Breakneck Creek is a tributary of Connoquenessing Creek that flows in a northwardly direction in Western Pennsylvania. It forms in the village of Bakerstown in Allegheny County then flows northwest through the borough of Valencia in Butler County.

From there, it continues northwest through the boroughs of Mars, Callery, and Evans City. Breakneck flows a few more miles until it reaches the village of Eidenau where it flows into Connoquenessing Creek.

== History ==
The only known train station to span a waterway was located in Evans City. The Evans City Station was constructed on a platform above Breakneck in downtown. This structure was included in the Ripley's Believe It or Not! archive. The building is no longer standing.

== Sources ==
- An Historical Gazetteer of Butler County, Pennsylvania, Mechling Bookbindery., 2006, ISBN 978-0-9760563-9-3.
- Cole, Wayne A., Ghost Rails VI Harmony Route, ColeBooks, 2009, ISBN 0-9727397-5-0.
- Parisi, Larry D., Butler County, Arcadia Publishing, 2004, ISBN 0-7385-3517-6.

== See also ==
- List of rivers of Pennsylvania
