= Lancaster Township, Butler County, Pennsylvania =

Township in Pennsylvania, US

Coordinates: 40°51′30″N 80°07′34″W

- Township
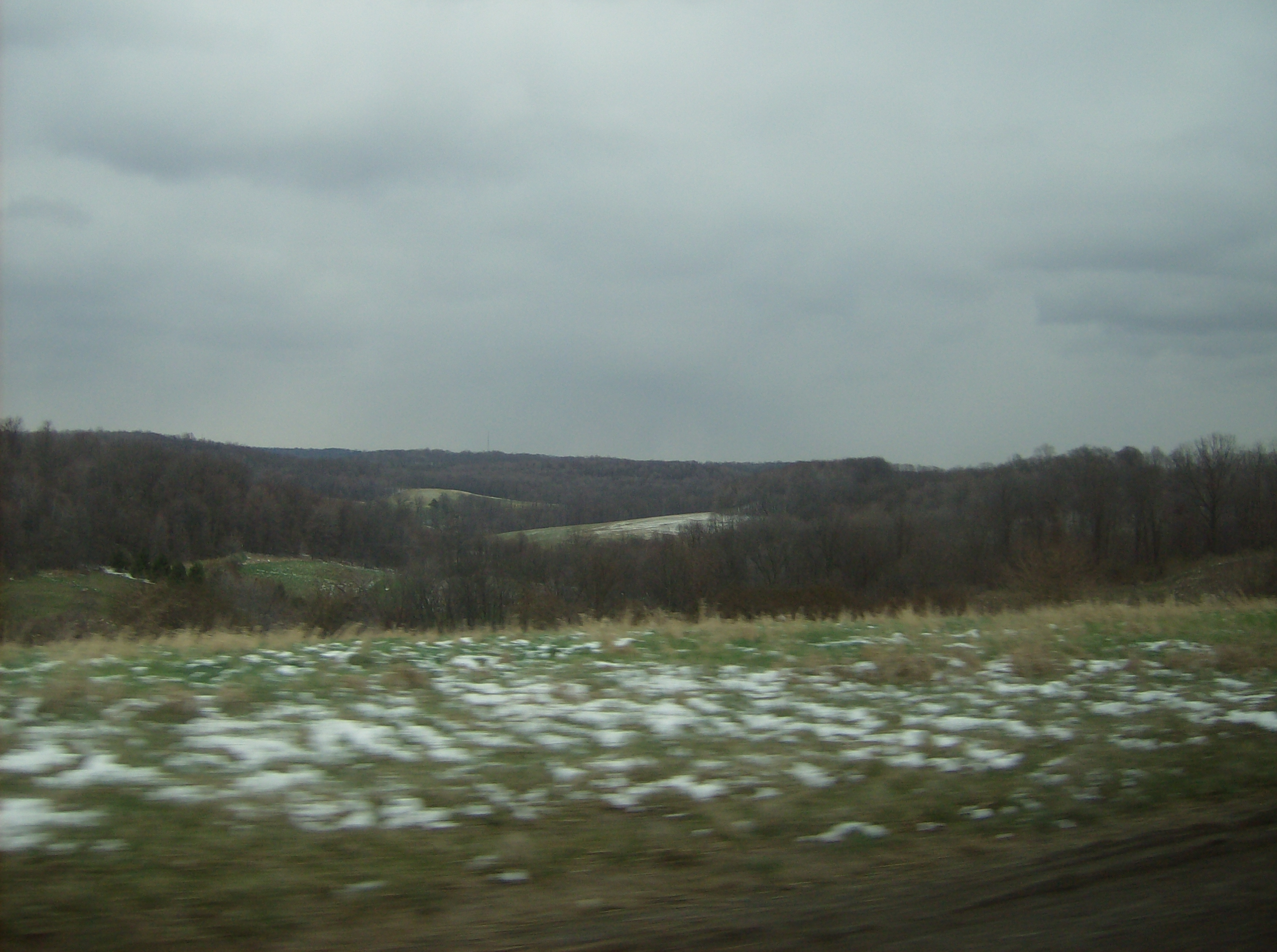
- View of countryside in Lancaster Township from U.S. Route 19

- Flag Logo

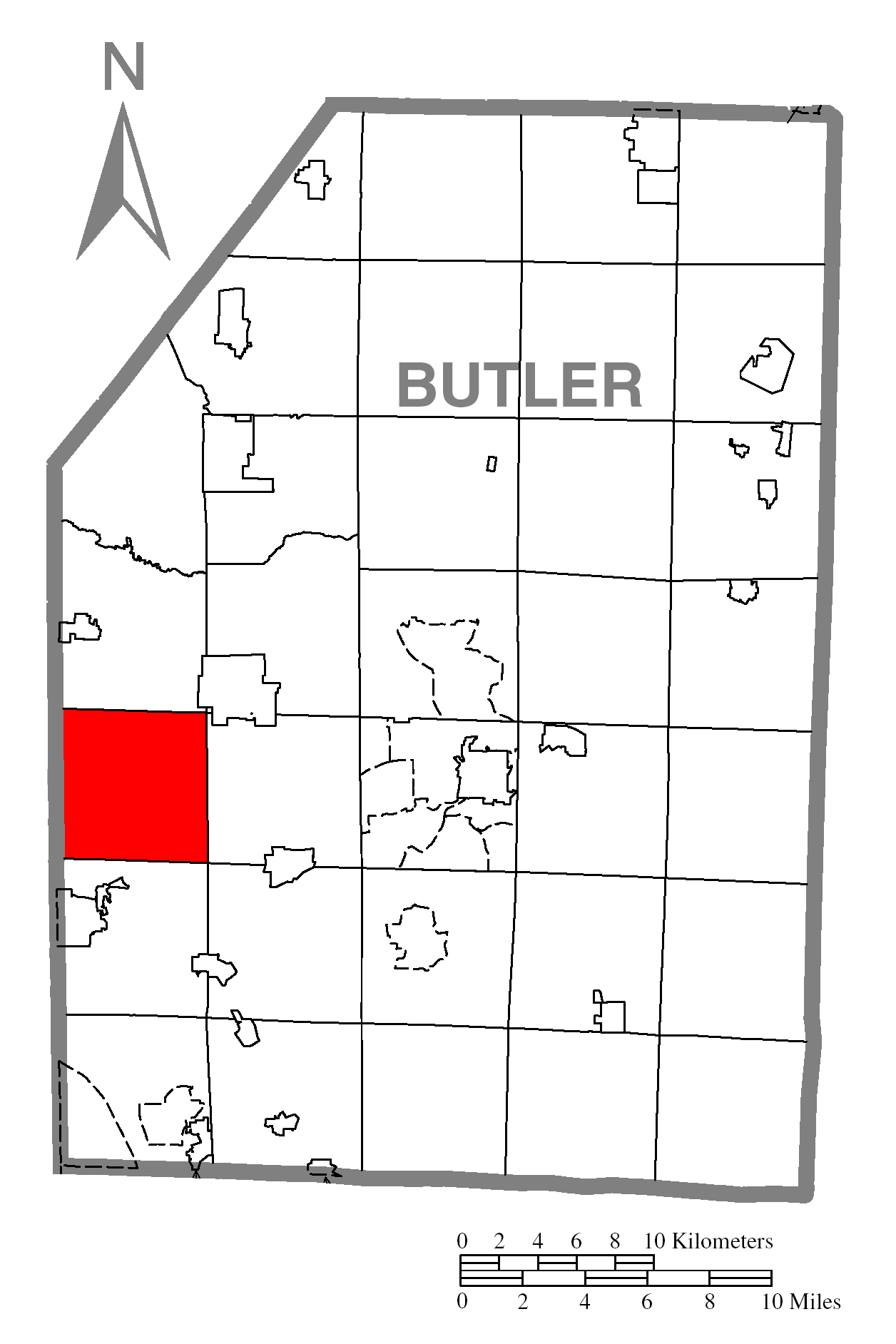
- Map of Butler County, Pennsylvania, highlighting Lancaster Township

- Map of Butler County, Pennsylvania
- Country: United States
- State: Pennsylvania
- County: Butler
- Settled: 1796
- Incorporated: 1854

Area
  - Total: 23.01 sq mi (59.59 km^{2})
  - Land: 23.00 sq mi (59.57 km^{2})
  - Water: 0.0077 sq mi (0.02 km^{2})

Population (2020)
  - Total: 2,747
  - Estimate (2022): 3,235
  - Density: 109.4/sq mi (42.23/km^{2})
- Time zone: UTC-5 (Eastern (EST))
  - Summer (DST): UTC-4 (EDT)
- FIPS code: 42-019-41208
- Website: www.lancaster-township.com

Lancaster Township is a township in Butler County, Pennsylvania, United States. As of the 2020 census, the township population was 2,747.

== Geography ==
Lancaster Township is located along the western border of Butler County, with Beaver and Lawrence counties to the west. The township includes the unincorporated community of Middle Lancaster.

Interstate 79 passes through the township, though with no exits. The nearest access points from I-79 are Exit 88 to the south in Jackson Township and Exit 96 to the north in Muddy Creek Township. U.S. Route 19, the Perry Highway, is a parallel local road that passes through the center of Middle Lancaster.

According to the United States Census Bureau, the township has a total area of 23.0 square miles (59.6 km^{2}), of which 0.0077 square miles (0.02 km^{2}), or 0.03%, is water.

== Demographics ==
Historical population
Census	Pop.	Note	%±
2010	2,532		—
2020	2,747		8.5%
2022 (est.)	3,235		17.8%
U.S. Decennial Census

As of the 2000 census, there were 2,511 people, 906 households, and 755 families residing in the township. The population density was 107.4 inhabitants per square mile (41.5/km^{2}). There were 932 housing units at an average density of 39.9 per square mile (15.4/km^{2}). The racial makeup of the township was 99.00% White, 0.24% African American, 0.24% Asian, 0.04% Pacific Islander, 0.08% from other races, and 0.40% from two or more races. Hispanic or Latino of any race were 0.44% of the population.

There were 906 households, out of which 36.4% had children under the age of 18 living with them, 73.0% were married couples living together, 6.1% had a female householder with no husband present, and 16.6% were non-families. 13.8% of all households were made up of individuals, and 3.2% had someone living alone who was 65 years of age or older. The average household size was 2.77 and the average family size was 3.04.

In the township the population was spread out, with 25.9% under the age of 18, 6.2% from 18 to 24, 31.0% from 25 to 44, 27.4% from 45 to 64, and 9.6% who were 65 years of age or older. The median age was 39 years. For every 100 females, there were 107.0 males. For every 100 females age 18 and over, there were 101.3 males.

The median income for a household in the township was $49,524, and the median income for a family was $53,621. Males had a median income of $39,286 versus $25,962 for females. The per capita income for the township was $21,845. About 5.1% of families and 6.7% of the population were below the poverty line, including 10.6% of those under age 18 and 5.0% of those age 65 or over.
