= Forward Township, Butler County, Pennsylvania =

Township in Pennsylvania, US

Coordinates: 40°46′36″N 80°00′30″W

- Township
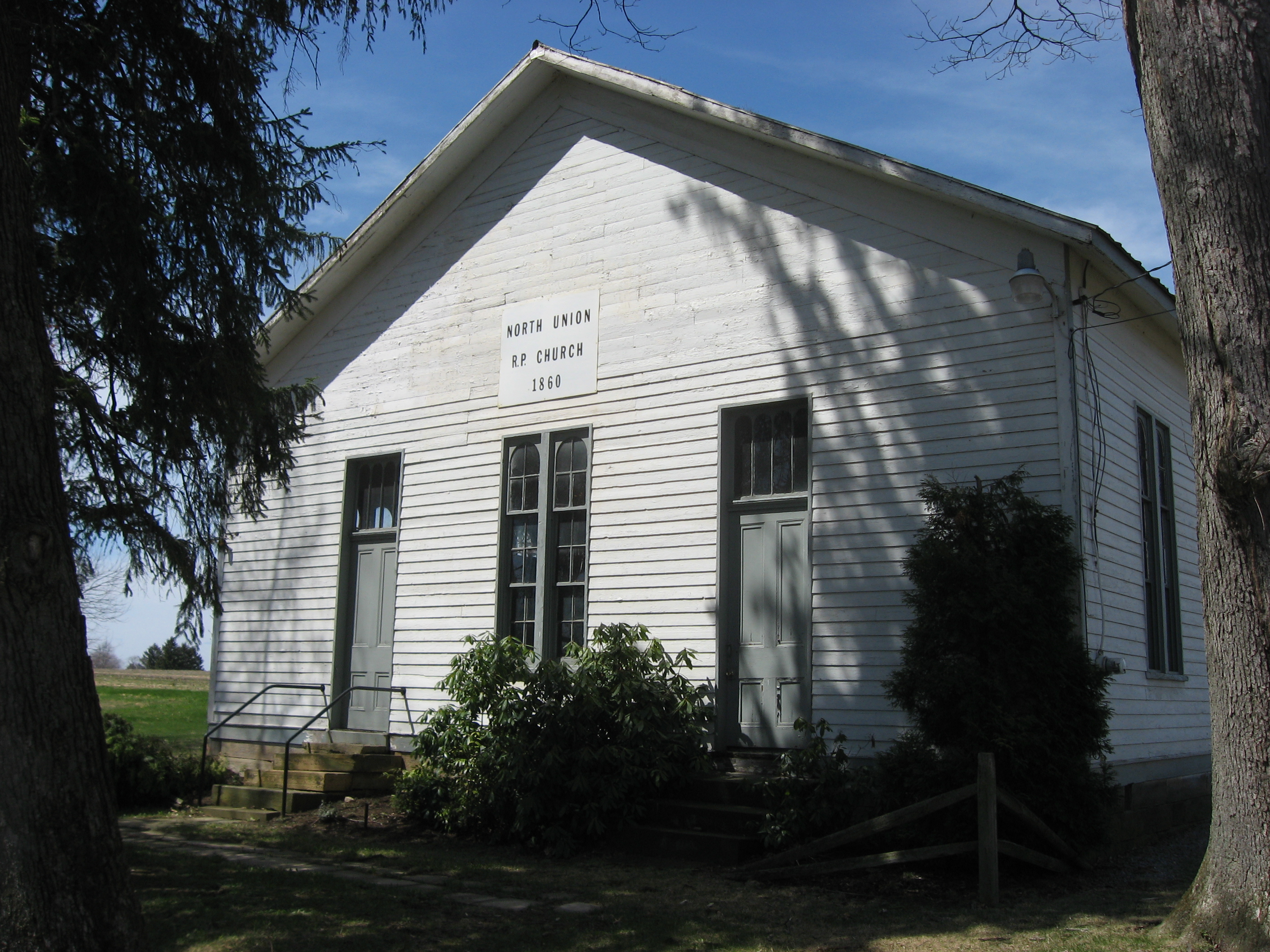
- North Union Reformed Presbyterian Church in eastern Forward Township

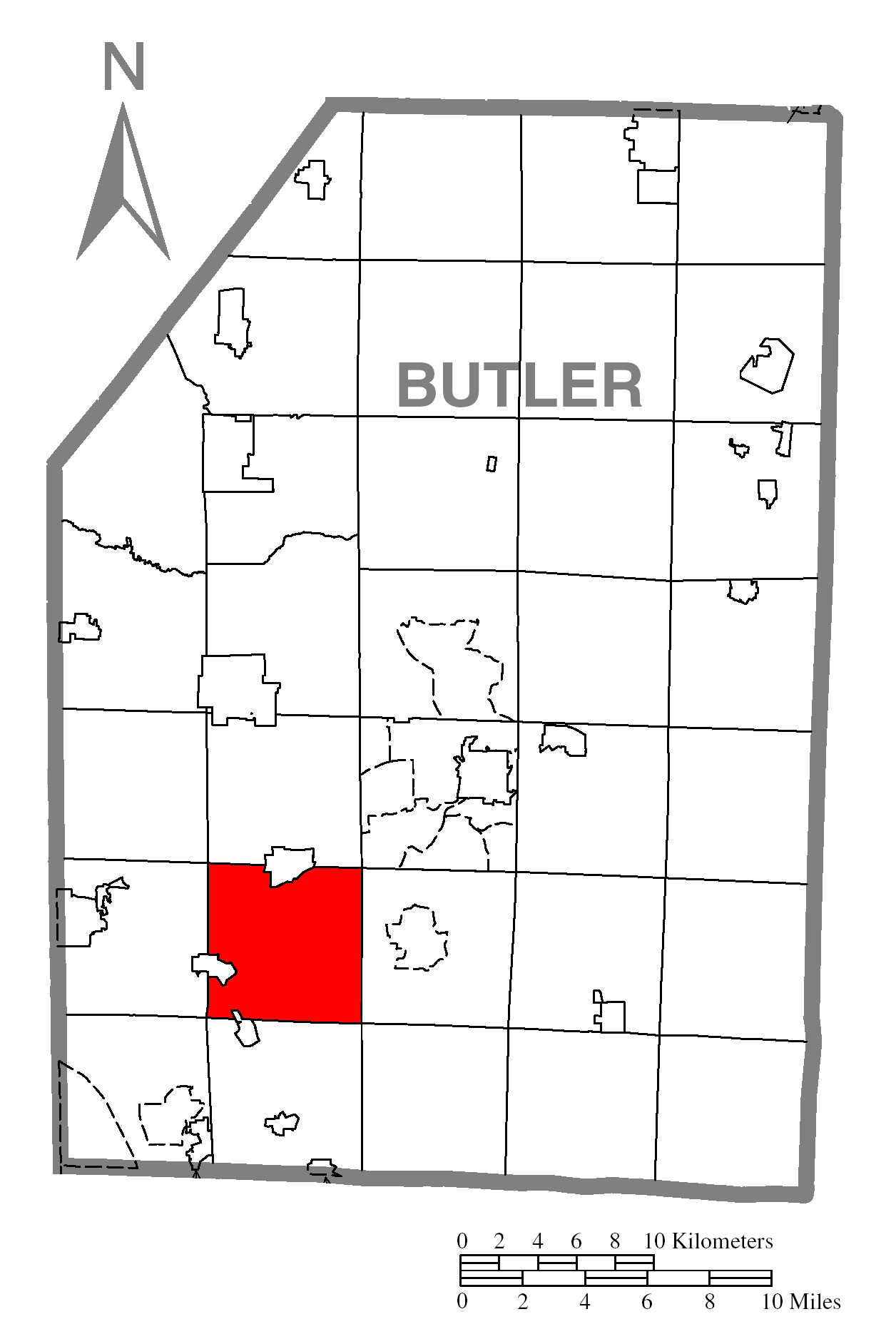
- Map of Butler County, Pennsylvania, highlighting Forward Township

- Map of Butler County, Pennsylvania
- Country: United States
- State: Pennsylvania
- County: Butler
- Settled: 1795
- Incorporated: 1854

Area
  - Total: 23.04 sq mi (59.67 km^{2})
  - Land: 23.03 sq mi (59.65 km^{2})
  - Water: 0.0077 sq mi (0.02 km^{2})

Population (2020)
  - Total: 3,164
  - Estimate (2022): 3,317
  - Density: 115.3/sq mi (44.53/km^{2})
- Time zone: UTC-5 (Eastern (EST))
  - Summer (DST): UTC-4 (EDT)
- FIPS code: 42-019-26904
- Website: forwardtwpbutlerco.us

Forward Township is a township in Butler County, Pennsylvania, United States. The population was 3,164 at the 2020 census.

== Geography ==
Forward Township is located in southwestern Butler County. It is bordered to the north by Connoquenessing Township and the borough of Connoquenessing, at its northeastern corner by Butler Township, to the east by Penn Township, at its southeastern corner by Middlesex Township, to the south by Adams Township and the borough of Callery, at its southwestern corner by Cranberry Township, to the west by Jackson Township and the borough of Evans City, and at its northwest corner by Lancaster Township. The unincorporated communities of Wahlville and Watters are in the township.

Connoquenessing Creek, a tributary of the Beaver River, flows through the northern part of the township from east to west, taking several large bends.

According to the United States Census Bureau, the township has a total area of 23.1 square miles (59.7 km^{2}), of which 0.008 square miles (0.02 km^{2}), or 0.04%, is water.

== Demographics ==
Historical population
Census	Pop.	Note	%±
2000	2,687		—
2010	2,531		−5.8%
2020	3,164		25.0%
2022 (est.)	3,317		4.8%
U.S. Decennial Census

As of the 2000 census, there were 2,687 people, 970 households, and 751 families residing in the township. The population density was 115.2 inhabitants per square mile (44.5/km^{2}). There were 1,089 housing units at an average density of 46.7 per square mile (18.0/km^{2}). The racial makeup of the township was 98.77% White, 0.19% African American, 0.22% Native American, 0.56% Asian, 0.11% from other races, and 0.15% from two or more races. Hispanic or Latino of any race were 0.33% of the population.

There were 970 households, out of which 36.1% had children under the age of 18 living with them, 68.2% were married couples living together, 5.5% had a female householder with no husband present, and 22.5% were non-families. 17.2% of all households were made up of individuals, and 6.3% had someone living alone who was 65 years of age or older. The average household size was 2.77 and the average family size was 3.15.

In the township the population was spread out, with 27.6% under the age of 18, 6.3% from 18 to 24, 30.3% from 25 to 44, 24.6% from 45 to 64, and 11.2% who were 65 years of age or older. The median age was 38 years. For every 100 females, there were 108.0 males. For every 100 females age 18 and over, there were 102.5 males.

The median income for a household in the township was $43,542, and the median income for a family was $50,552. Males had a median income of $35,288 versus $25,573 for females. The per capita income for the township was $17,175. About 3.5% of families and 4.9% of the population were below the poverty line, including 4.6% of those under age 18 and 9.0% of those age 65 or over.
