= Evans City, Pennsylvania =

Borough in Pennsylvania, US

Evans City
- Borough
- Borough of Evans City
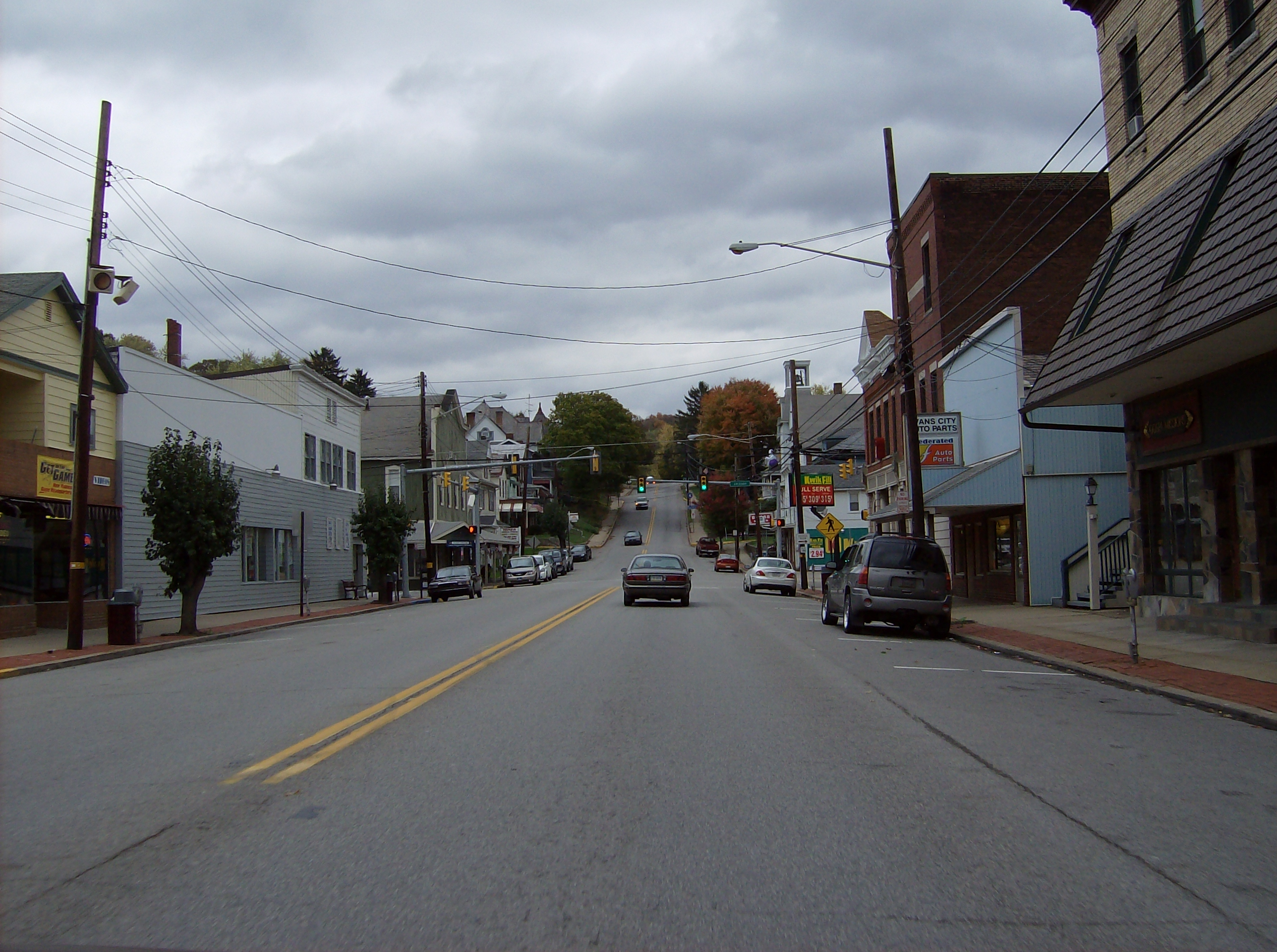
- Along Route 68 in downtown Evans City

- Location of Evans City in Butler County, Pennsylvania.

- Location of Pennsylvania in the United States
- Coordinates: 40°46′10″N 80°3′41″W
- Country: United States
- State: Pennsylvania
- County: Butler
- Settled: 1830
- Incorporated: 1882

Area
  - Total: 0.82 sq mi (2.12 km^{2})
  - Land: 0.82 sq mi (2.12 km^{2})
  - Water: 0 sq mi (0.00 km^{2})

Population (2020)
  - Total: 1,737
  - Density: 2,122.7/sq mi (819.59/km^{2})
- Time zone: UTC-5 (EST)
  - Summer (DST): UTC-4 (EDT)
- ZIP code: 16033
- Area code: 724
- FIPS code: 42-24248
- School district: Seneca Valley school district
- Website: evanscity.us

Evans City is a borough in Butler County, Pennsylvania, United States. As of the 2020 census, Evans City had a population of 1,737.

== Geography ==
Evans City is located in southwestern Butler County at 40°46′10″N 80°3′41″W (40.769310, −80.061409), in the valley of Breakneck Creek. It is bordered to the north, west, and south by Jackson Township, and to the north, east, and south by Forward Township.

Pennsylvania Route 68 passes through the borough, leading northeast 12 miles (19 km) to Butler, the county seat, and northwest 5 miles (8 km) to Zelienople.

According to the United States Census Bureau, Evans City has a total area of 0.81 square miles (2.1 km^{2}), all land.

== Demographics ==
Historical population
Census	Pop.	Note	%±
1890	637		—
1900	1,203		88.9%
1910	1,339		11.3%
1920	1,548		15.6%
1930	1,561		0.8%
1940	1,604		2.8%
1950	1,637		2.1%
1960	1,825		11.5%
1970	2,144		17.5%
1980	2,299		7.2%
1990	2,054		−10.7%
2000	2,009		−2.2%
2010	1,833		−8.8%
2020	1,737		−5.2%

As of the 2000 census, there were 2,009 people, 819 households, and 548 families residing in the borough. The population density was 2,476.1 inhabitants per square mile (956.0/km^{2}). There were 850 housing units at an average density of 1,047.6 per square mile (404.5/km^{2}). The racial makeup of the borough was 99.10% White, 0.15% African American, 0.10% Native American, 0.25% Asian, 0.05% Pacific Islander, and 0.35% from two or more races. Hispanic or Latino of any race were 0.05% of the population.

There were 819 households, out of which 31.6% had children under the age of 18 living with them, 53.1% were married couples living together, 10.3% had a female householder with no husband present, and 33.0% were non-families. 28.9% of all households were made up of individuals, and 13.4% had someone living alone who was 65 years of age or older. The average household size was 2.44 and the average family size was 3.02.

In the borough the population was spread out, with 24.3% under the age of 18, 8.4% from 18 to 24, 31.3% from 25 to 44, 20.2% from 45 to 64, and 15.9% who were 65 years of age or older. The median age was 36 years. For every 100 females, there were 97.9 males. For every 100 females age 18 and over, there were 94.0 males.

The median income for a household in the borough was $41,128, and the median income for a family was $50,469. Males had a median income of $37,734 versus $24,306 for females. The per capita income for the borough was $18,931. About 4.0% of families and 6.4% of the population were below the poverty line, including 9.0% of those under age 18 and 5.5% of those age 65 or over.

== History ==
The site that is now Evans City was for a long time a camping ground for Native Americans, who named the creek that ran through it Big Beaver Run, while the French knew it as Casse-cou-anse or "Breakneck Creek", a name adopted by travelers between Fort Duquesne and Fort Machault, and by the English-speaking pioneers of the original township of Connoquenessing. From 1804 to 1836, the location was often called "Boggs' Mill", and in later years "Evansburg", after Thomas B. Evans, who purchased and rebuilt the original Boggs' Mill. In 1880 it was a little hamlet, credited with a population of 68 people. In 1890, there were 637 persons enumerated in the census, and at the beginning of 1894, it was generally credited with a population of approximately 1,000.

In October 1878, the railroad was completed to Evans City; the first freight to be delivered was a new boiler to replace one which had exploded in the Sutton flouring mill. The bank of Jacob Dambach & Son was in existence. The residence for the pastor of the German Lutheran church, the Henry Young store and other houses were completed, and the new railroad town showed increased signs of business activity. A council appears to have had control of the place at that time, as mention is made of street improvements and of the appointment of Z. T. Weise as chief of police.

The location chosen for the local railroad depot made it the nation's only depot that was built over water. Spanning the Breakneck Creek on iron beams for support, the railway station was an iconic landmark of architecture. Due to its age and growing structural instability, and against much popular protest, the station was finally demolished in the early 1980s rather than restored.

Later the school question occupied the attention of the people. Ultimately the schools were placed under the control of the Jackson Township board after a resolution by the Evans City school building committee was withdrawn.

In 1882 Evans City was incorporated as a borough. At the charter election held September 22, of that year, Edward Dambach (son of Jacob Dambach) was chosen burgess.

The first churches of record in the area were as follows:

- Amana Baptist Church was organized March 22, 1820. Late in 1881 some 33 members withdrew to form an independent Baptist church.
- The United Presbyterian Church was founded about 1837. Services were held in the frame school-building in the old United Presbyterian cemetery, until about 1842, when a brick house of worship was erected. Owing to the age of the old building and its unsafe condition, a new house of worship was considered necessary and the present building was erected. This is a frame house 45 by 60 feet (14 by 18 m), well furnished, with pastor's study, standing on the old church lot on Main Street. It was dedicated in April 1888.
- St. Peter's Evangelical Lutheran is a contemporary of the "German Lutheran and Reformed Congregation". In 1849 it was known as the "Reformed Church", then united with the German Lutheran, and so continued until August 2, 1853, when fifteen of the thirty families forming the united congregation held distinct Reformed services in the church built in 1849–1850.
- The Presbyterian Church was founded in 1882 out of the Old Plains Church congregation.
- St. John's United Christian Church was organized in August 1888.
- The Methodist Episcopal Church was dedicated on October 27, 1889. The old class at Caleb Richmond's, in Forward Township, later consolidated with the Brownsdale class, claimed some members from the Breakneck region, as well as did the Duthill class in Cranberry township to form the original members.

The Evans City Cemetery and the borough became popularly known as the place where the 1968 horror film Night of the Living Dead was filmed. The film's director, George A. Romero, also shot his 1973 film The Crazies in and around Evans City.

== Economy and environment ==
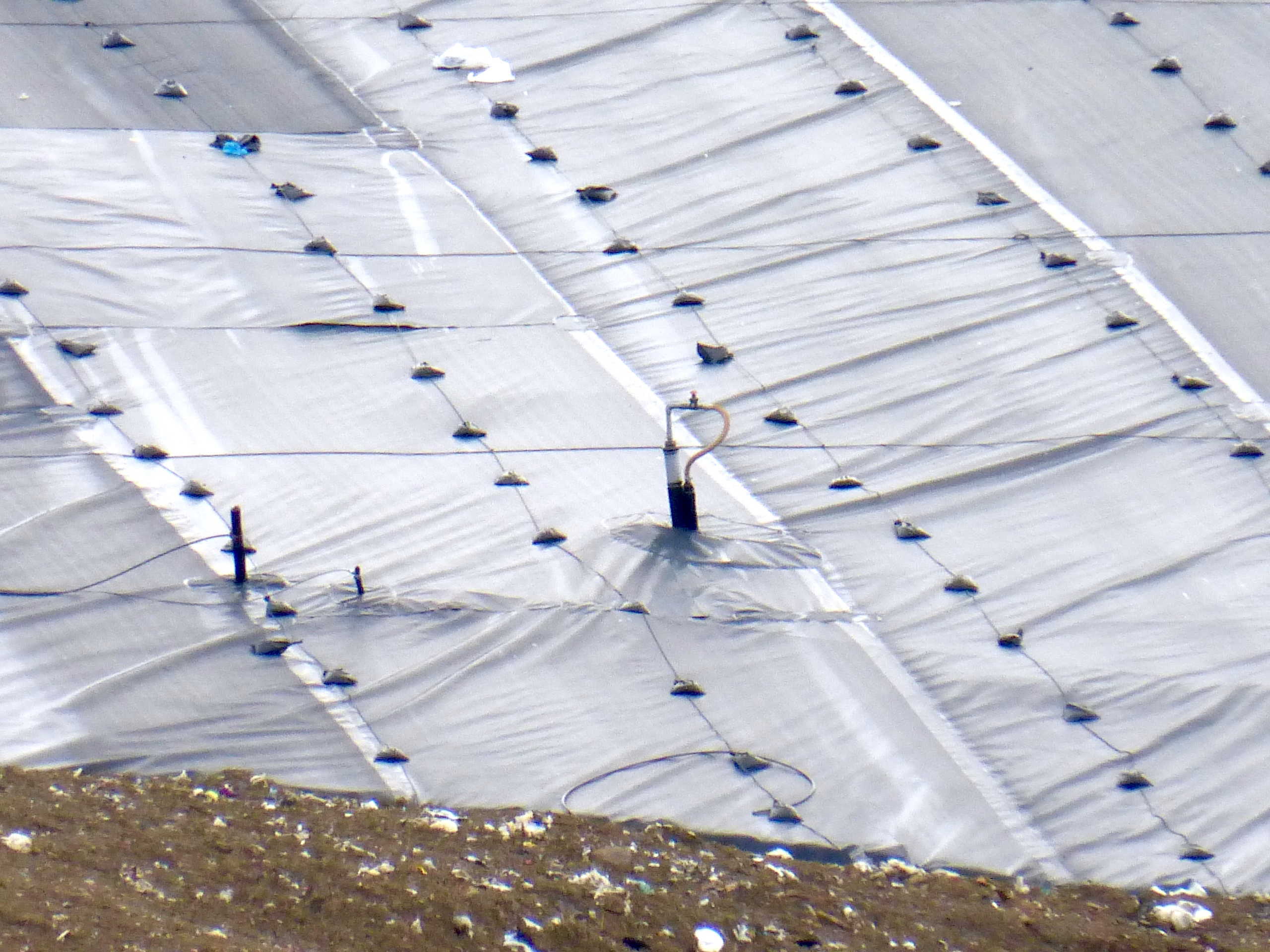
Landfill gas collection from capped landfill area

Seneca Landfill, near Evans City, captures methane, which it converts to renewable natural gas at its on-site methane recovery high-BTU plant, LEGO-V. The landfill produces .34MW of electricity, and enough renewable energy to heat over 3,800 homes per year. This reduces the county's methane emissions, and provides an alternative to fracking for shale gas.

== Government ==
Evans City Borough is represented by a municipal government of one Mayor and five Council members. Currently Dean Zinkhann serves as the Mayor of Evans City, and the council consists of the following members: President Cheri Deener, Rob Reppert, Brad Rubinosky, Patty Tumminello-Murphy, Mark Widdersheim, and Lori Brooks.

The Connoquenessing Valley Regional Emergency Management Agency (EMA) is the disaster management agency of the borough.

== Education ==
It is in the Seneca Valley School District.
