= Harmony, Pennsylvania =

Borough in Pennsylvania, US

- Borough
- Borough of Harmony
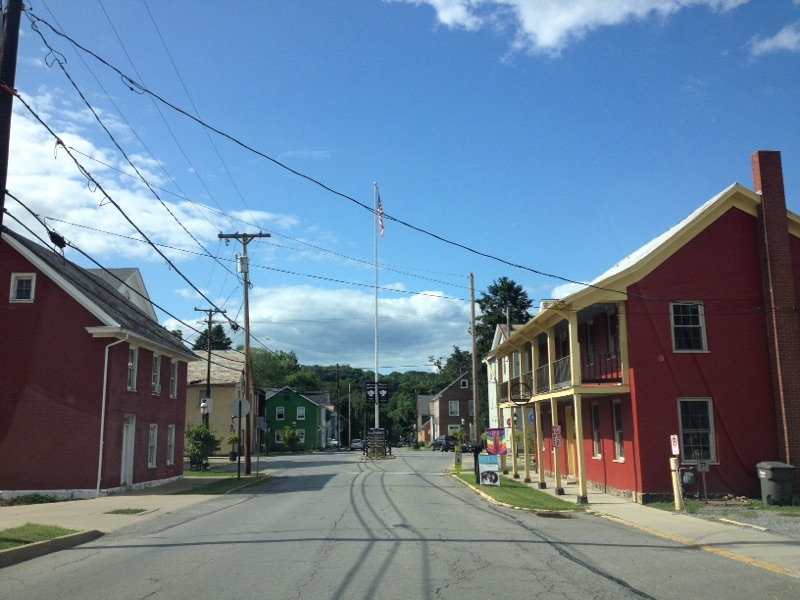

- Location of Harmony in Butler County, Pennsylvania.

- Location of Pennsylvania in the United States
- Coordinates: 40°48′10″N 80°7′40″W
- Country: United States
- State: Pennsylvania
- County: Butler County
- Settled: 1804
- Incorporated: 1838

Government
  - Mayor: Cathy Rape

Area
  - Total: 0.40 sq mi (1.03 km^{2})
  - Land: 0.39 sq mi (1.02 km^{2})
  - Water: 0.0039 sq mi (0.01 km^{2})

Population (2020)
  - Total: 942
  - Density: 2,392.8/sq mi (923.88/km^{2})
- Time zone: UTC-5 (EST)
  - Summer (DST): UTC-4 (EDT)
- Zip Code: 16037
- Area code: 724
- FIPS code: 42-32688
- School district: Seneca Valley school district
- Website: www.harmony-pa.us

Harmony is a borough in Butler County, Pennsylvania, United States. As of the 2020 census, Harmony had a population of 942. It is located approximately 30 miles (48 km) north of Pittsburgh.

== Geography ==
Harmony is located in southwestern Butler County, along the northeastern border of the borough of Zelienople. It is in the valley of Connoquenessing Creek, a tributary of the Beaver River.

Interstate 79 passes just east of the borough, with access from exits 87 and 88. Via I-79 it is 30 miles (48 km) south to downtown Pittsburgh and 99 miles (159 km) north to Erie. Pennsylvania Route 68 passes through the borough, just south of the downtown and leads west into Zelienople and east 17 miles (27 km) to Butler, the county seat.

According to the United States Census Bureau, Harmony has a total area of 0.39 square miles (1.0 km^{2}), of which 0.004 square miles (0.01 km^{2}), or 1.23%, is water.

== Demographics ==
Historical population
Census	Pop.	Note	%±
1850	441		—
1860	442		0.2%
1870	414		−6.3%
1880	497		20.0%
1890	585		17.7%
1900	645		10.3%
1910	673		4.3%
1920	757		12.5%
1930	780		3.0%
1940	846		8.5%
1950	912		7.8%
1960	1,142		25.2%
1970	1,207		5.7%
1980	1,334		10.5%
1990	1,054		−21.0%
2000	937		−11.1%
2010	890		−5.0%
2020	942		5.8%

As of the 2000 census, there were 937 people, 409 households, and 267 families residing in the borough. The population density was 2,468.0 inhabitants per square mile (952.9/km^{2}). There were 434 housing units at an average density of 1,143.1 per square mile (441.4/km^{2}). The racial makeup of the borough was 99.15% White, 0.53% African American, 0.21% Native American, and 0.11% from two or more races. Hispanic or Latino of any race were 0.64% of the population.

There were 409 households, out of which 23.7% had children under the age of 18 living with them, 54.3% were married couples living together, 6.8% had a female householder with no husband present, and 34.5% were non-families. 27.9% of all households were made up of individuals, and 10.0% had someone living alone who was 65 years of age or older. The average household size was 2.29 and the average family size was 2.82.

In the borough the population was spread out, with 19.9% under the age of 18, 7.0% from 18 to 24, 30.2% from 25 to 44, 26.4% from 45 to 64, and 16.5% who were 65 years of age or older. The median age was 41 years. For every 100 females, there were 94.0 males. For every 100 females age 18 and over, there were 92.6 males.

The median income for a household in the borough was $40,833, and the median income for a family was $47,411. Males had a median income of $36,875 versus $25,357 for females. The per capita income for the borough was $21,693. About 3.1% of families and 4.5% of the population were below the poverty line, including 8.0% of those under age 18 and 5.7% of those age 65 or over.

== History ==
In December 1753, George Washington and Christopher Gist came through the area. They were shot at somewhere between present-day Evans City and Ellwood City (the exact location is unknown), through a region above the forks of the Ohio known as Mutheringtown or "Murdering Town". In 2003, the borough commemorated the event as part of the 250th Anniversary Commemoration of the French and Indian War.

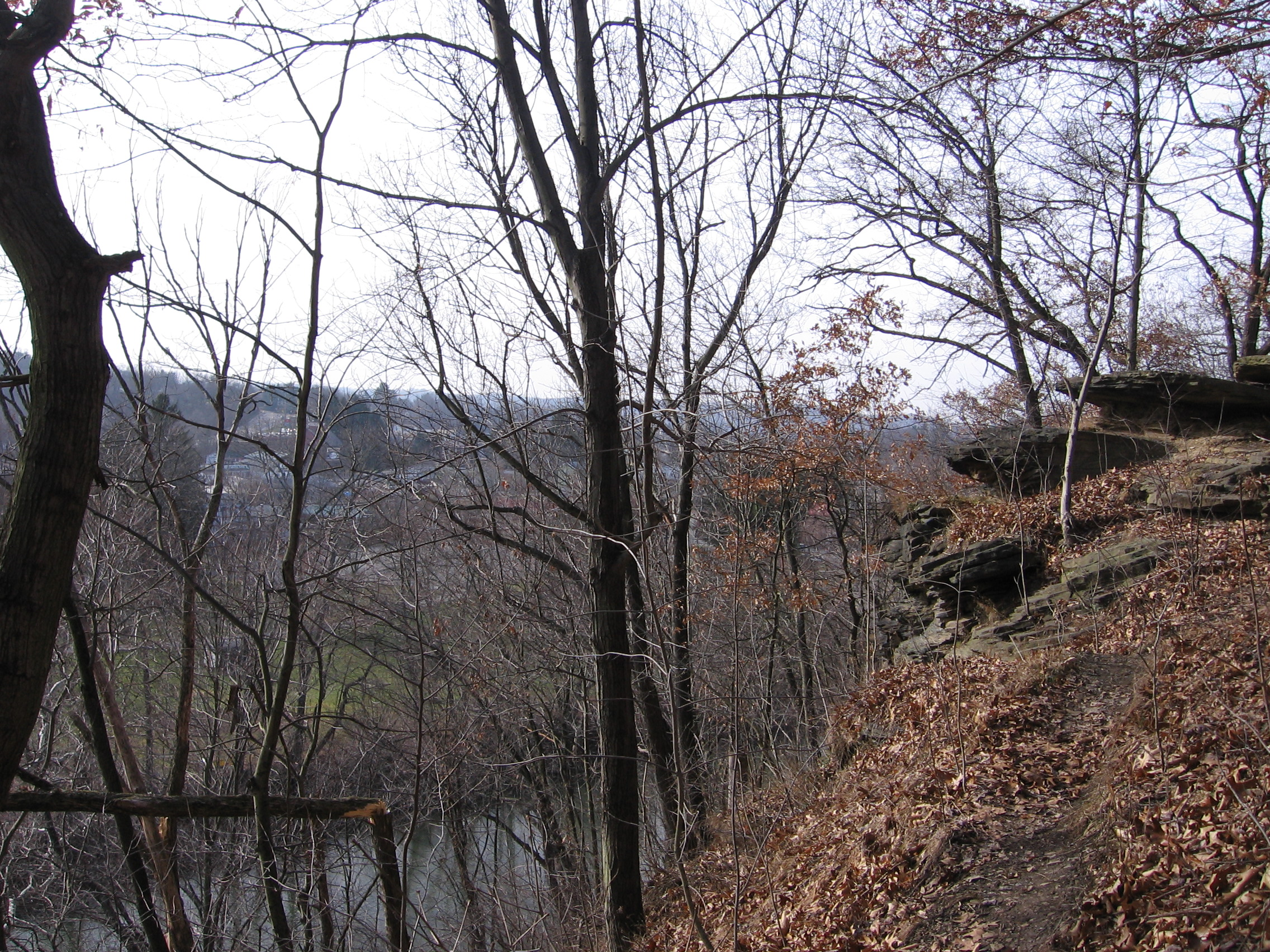
Rapp's Seat overlooking Harmony and Connoquenessing Creek

Harmony was founded by the pietist Johann Georg Rapp and his Harmony Society in 1804. Rapp came to America from Württemberg, Germany, in 1803 in search of land for his followers that was free from the religious persecution they faced in Germany. He was searching for a place for his followers to worship, farm, and put Rapp's communal religious teachings into effect . In 1804, two groups of Harmonites purchased a tract of land in Butler County.

They formally established the Harmony Society in 1805 and lived in Pennsylvania for about 10 years before selling the Harmony property in 1814 to Abraham Ziegler, a Mennonite, and moving west to Indiana Territory, where they built the town of Harmony on the Wabash River (now New Harmony, Indiana). In 1824, they moved back to Pennsylvania, this time to Economy (now Ambridge). The settlements were economically successful, producing many goods in a clothing factory, a sawmill, a tannery, and from their vineyards and distillery. A hotel was also run in Harmony. In Economy, the group aided the construction of the Pittsburgh and Lake Erie Railroad, established the Economy Savings Institution and the Economy Brick Works, and operated the Economy Oil Company, Economy Planing Mill, Economy Lumber Company, and eventually donated some land in Beaver Falls for the construction of Geneva College. In 1869, Mennonite craftsmen built the stone wall around the Harmonite cemetery in Harmony with a unique revolving stone door. The society exerted a major influence on the economic development of western Pennsylvania. Since the group chose to adopt celibacy, they eventually died out when John S. and his wife Susanna C. Duss, the last surviving leaders of Harmony Society, died in 1951.

The Mennonite community in Harmony lasted until around 1904, by which time the town was selling more and more individual plots. Still extant is an old Mennonite meeting house on a hill near Harmony that was built in 1825.

Harmony's history, particularly that of the Harmony Society, is preserved at the Harmony Museum, operated in the town by Historic Harmony, Inc.

On a hill in Harmony, situated above Connoquenessing Creek, sits a "seat" of stone (actually a rock formation). This seat was said to be used by Rapp to watch over the commune and its members in their daily lives. Thanks to local Boy Scout Troop 457 of Zelienople, a set of steps were built leading up to the seat as part of an Eagle Scout project for Christopher Van Arsdale of Harmony.

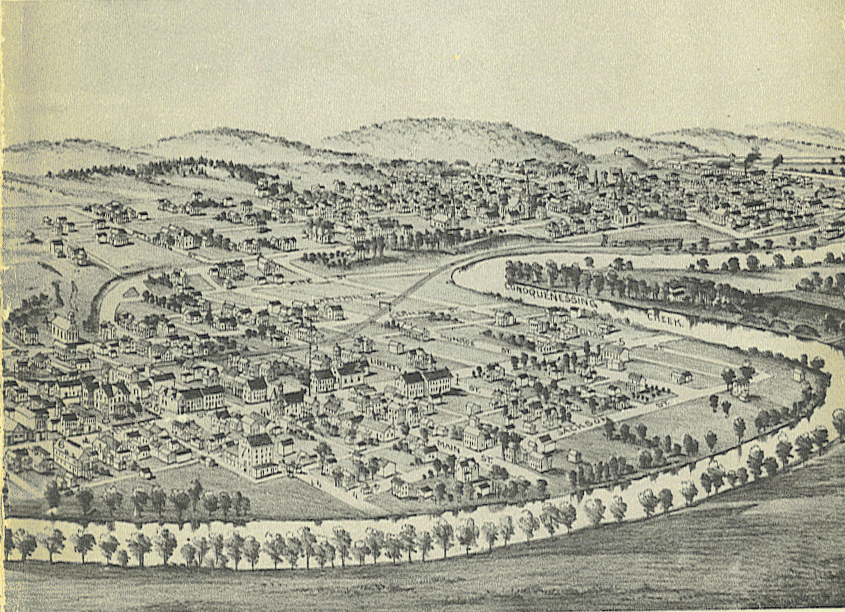
Harmony in 1901

== Education ==
It is in the Seneca Valley School District.

== In popular culture ==
Harmony is the setting for the film My Bloody Valentine 3D. The film was filmed farther east in the boroughs of Ford City and Kittanning.

Harmony appears in the X-Men '97 multi-part episode "Tolerance is Extinction". It is the hometown of Bastion, who converted its population into Prime Sentinel cyborgs.

== See also ==
- Harmony Historic District
- Old Economy Village
