= Pennsylvania Turnpike =

Toll highway in the United States

Pennsylvania Turnpike
- Pennsylvania Turnpike mainline highlighted in green

Route information
- Maintained by PTC
- Length: 360.09 mi (579.51 km)
- Existed: October 1, 1940–present
- History: Philadelphia Extension completed on November 20, 1950; Western Extension completed on December 1, 1954; Delaware River Extension completed on May 23, 1956
- Component highways: I-76 Toll from Ohio state line to King of Prussia; I-70 Toll from New Stanton to Breezewood; I-276 Toll from King of Prussia to Bristol Township; I-95 from Bristol Township to New Jersey state line
- Restrictions: No hazardous goods allowed in tunnels

Major junctions
- West end: I-76 Toll / Ohio Turnpike at the Ohio state line near S.N.P.J.
- I-376 Toll in Big Beaver; I-79 / US 19 in Cranberry Township; I-376 / US 22 / US 22 Bus. in Monroeville; I-70 from New Stanton to Breezewood; I-83 near New Cumberland; I-283 near Highspire; I-176 / PA 10 near Morgantown; I-76 in King of Prussia; I-476 / Penna Turnpike NE Extension in Plymouth Meeting; I-95 near Bristol
- East end: I-95 / Pearl Harbor Extension at the New Jersey state line near Tullytown

Location
- Country: United States
- State: Pennsylvania
- Counties: Lawrence, Beaver, Butler, Allegheny, Westmoreland, Somerset, Bedford, Fulton, Huntingdon, Franklin, Cumberland, York, Dauphin, Lebanon, Lancaster, Berks, Chester, Montgomery, Bucks

Highway system
- Pennsylvania State Route System; Interstate; US; State; Scenic; Legislative
← PA 75	I-76	→ PA 76
← PA 274	I-276	→ PA 276
← I-279	I-280	→ PA 280

Pennsylvania Historical Marker
- Designated: 1990

The Pennsylvania Turnpike, sometimes shortened to Penna Turnpike or PA Turnpike, is a controlled-access toll road which is operated by the Pennsylvania Turnpike Commission (PTC) in Pennsylvania. It runs for 360 miles (580 km) across the southern part of the state, connecting Pittsburgh, Harrisburg and Philadelphia, and passes through four tunnels as it crosses the Appalachian Mountains. A component of the Interstate Highway System, it is part of I-76 between the Ohio state line and Valley Forge (running concurrently with I-70 between New Stanton and Breezewood), I-276 between Valley Forge and Bristol Township, and I-95 from Bristol Township to the New Jersey state line.

The turnpike's western terminus is at the Ohio state line in Lawrence County, where it continues west as the Ohio Turnpike. The eastern terminus is the New Jersey state line at the Delaware River–Turnpike Toll Bridge, which crosses the Delaware River in Bucks County. It continues east as the Pearl Harbor Memorial Extension of the New Jersey Turnpike. The turnpike has an all-electronic tolling system; tolls may be paid using E-ZPass or toll by plate, which uses automatic license plate recognition. Cash tolls were collected with a ticket and barrier toll system before they were phased out between 2016 and 2020. The turnpike currently has 15 service plazas, providing food and fuel to travelers.

The turnpike was designed during the 1930s to improve automobile transportation across the Pennsylvania mountains, using seven tunnels built for the South Pennsylvania Railroad in the 1880s. It opened in 1940 between Irwin and Carlisle. Branded as "America's First Superhighway", the turnpike, an early long-distance limited-access U.S. highway, was a model for future limited-access toll roads and the Interstate Highway System. It was extended east to Valley Forge in 1950 and west to the Ohio state line in 1951. The road was extended east to the Delaware River in 1954, and construction began on an extension into Northeastern Pennsylvania. The mainline turnpike was finished in 1956 with the completion of the Delaware River Bridge.

From 1962 to 1971, an additional tube was built at four of the two-lane tunnels, with two cuts built to replace the three others; this made the entirety of the road four lanes wide. Improvements continue to be made: rebuilding to meet modern standards, widening portions to six lanes, and construction or reconstruction of interchanges.

== Route description ==
The turnpike runs west to east across Pennsylvania, from the Ohio state line in Lawrence County to the New Jersey state line in Bucks County. It passes through the Pittsburgh, Harrisburg, and Philadelphia areas, farmland and woodland. The highway crosses the Appalachian Mountains in central Pennsylvania, passing through four tunnels. The PTC, created in 1937 to construct, finance, operate, and maintain the road, controls the highway. In 2023, the turnpike had annual average daily traffic ranging from a high of 120,000 vehicles (between the Norristown Interchange and the Fort Washington Interchange) to a low of 21,000 (between the Breezewood Interchange and the Carlisle Interchange).

It is part of the National Highway System, a network of roads important to the U.S. economy, defense, and mobility. The turnpike is a Blue Star Memorial Highway, honoring those who have served in the United States Armed Forces, and the Garden Club Federation of Pennsylvania has placed Blue Star Memorial Highway markers at its service plazas. In addition to the east–west mainline, the PTC also operates the Northeast Extension (I-476), the Beaver Valley Expressway (I-376), the Mon–Fayette Expressway (PA 43), the Amos K. Hutchinson Bypass (PA 66), and the Southern Beltway (PA 576).

=== Western Extension ===
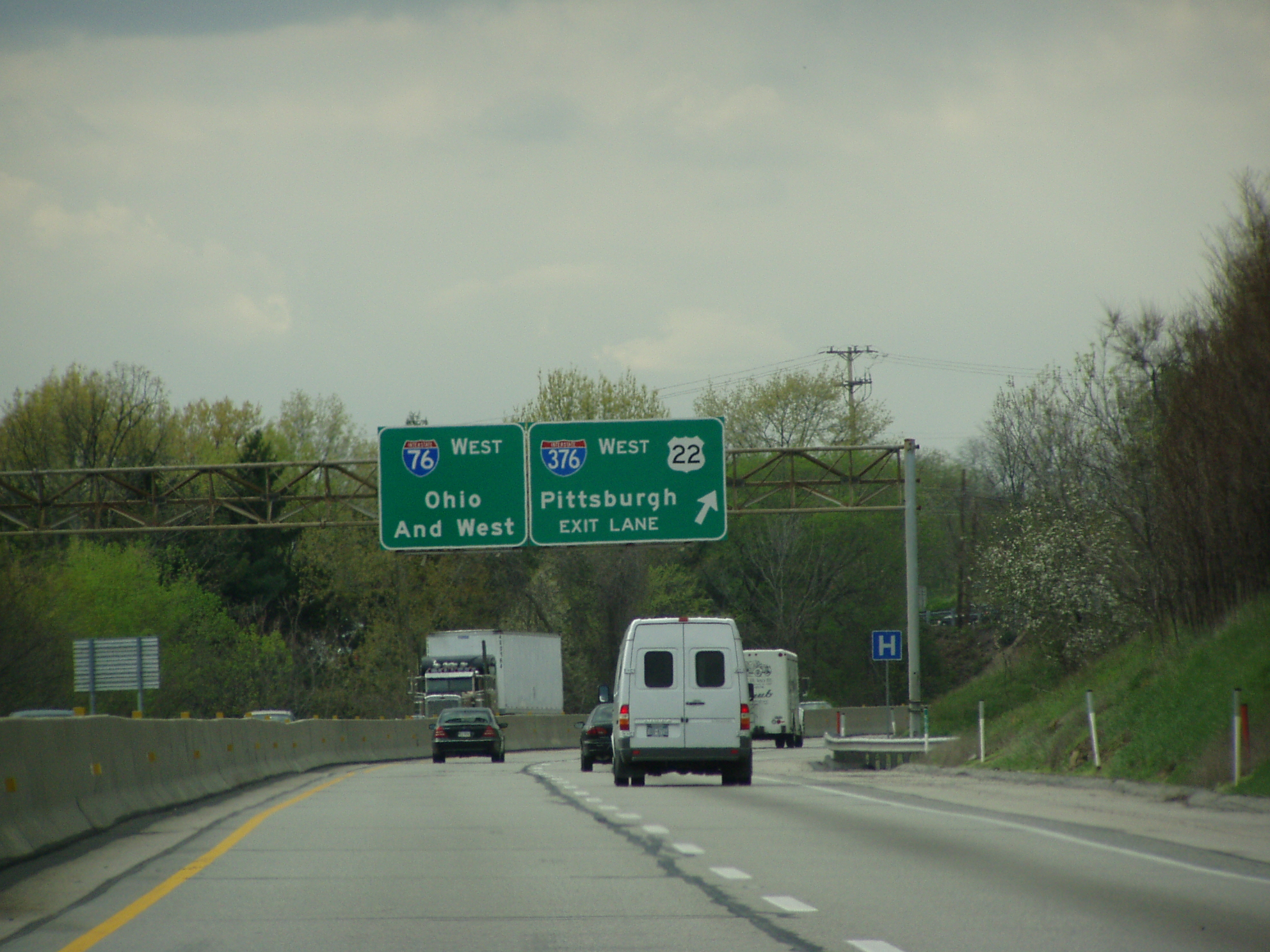
Westbound approaching the Pittsburgh Interchange with I-376/US 22 in Monroeville

The turnpike begins at the Ohio state line in Lawrence County, where it continues west as the Ohio Turnpike. From the state line, the highway heads southeast as a four-lane freeway (I-76) through rural areas south of New Castle. A short distance from the Ohio line, the eastbound lanes pass the electronic Gateway toll gantry, where the road widens to six lanes. The highway then reaches Beaver County and the first interchange with I-376 (the Beaver Valley Expressway) in Big Beaver, narrowing back to four lanes.

It then passes under Norfolk Southern's Koppel Secondary rail line before the exit for PA 18 near Homewood, crossing CSX's Pittsburgh Subdivision rail line, the Beaver River, and Norfolk Southern's Youngstown Line on the Beaver River Bridge. The road enters Butler County and Cranberry Township, where an interchange accesses I-79 and US 19. It widens to six lanes and continues through rural land and suburban development north of Pittsburgh into Allegheny County.

The turnpike approaches the Warrendale toll gantry (where the closed toll system begins) and continues southeast, narrowing to four lanes and passing over the CSX P&W Subdivision rail line operated by the Buffalo and Pittsburgh Railroad to an interchange with PA 8 in Hampton Township, becoming six lanes wide again. The Allegheny Valley exit in Harmar Township accesses PA 28 via Freeport Road. The road then heads south, with Canadian National's Bessemer Subdivision rail line parallel on the east, before crossing Norfolk Southern's Conemaugh Line, the Allegheny River, and the Allegheny Valley Railroad's Allegheny Subdivision line on the Allegheny River Turnpike Bridge.

After the river crossing, the road passes through the Oakmont Country Club before a bridge over Canadian National's Bessemer Subdivision; where it narrows to four lanes and the rail tracks parallel the west side of the road before splitting further west. The highway heads southeast to Monroeville, an eastern suburb of Pittsburgh; an interchange with US 22 and the eastern terminus of I-376 (the Penn–Lincoln Parkway) accesses Pittsburgh. It traverses eastern Allegheny County before entering Westmoreland County. The turnpike then heads south and passes over Norfolk Southern's Pittsburgh Line before the exit for US 30 near Irwin.

=== Original mainline ===
After the Irwin Interchange, the turnpike widens to six lanes and heads into rural areas west of Greensburg. Curving southeast, it reaches New Stanton and an interchange for I-70, US 119, and the southern terminus of PA 66 (Amos K. Hutchinson Bypass). The road returns to four lanes there, and I-70 is concurrent with I-76. After New Stanton it passes over the Southwest Pennsylvania Railroad's Radebaugh Subdivision line and winds southeast, gaining a third eastbound lane, and comes to the exit for PA 31 in Donegal, which accesses PA 711. East of Donegal, the turnpike crosses the Laurel Hill cut, and soon after enters Somerset County, where it gains a third westbound lane.

It continues southeast to Somerset and an interchange with PA 601 accessing US 219 and Johnstown, where it narrows to four lanes, before crossing CSX's S&C Subdivision rail line. East of Somerset, the highway passes north of the Somerset Wind Farm and briefly has a third westbound lane before reaching Allegheny Mountain and its tunnel. The turnpike then winds down the mountain at a three-percent grade (its steepest), with a third westbound lane. After descending the mountain, the westbound direction narrows to two lanes and heads into Bedford County through a valley. In Bedford, an exit for US 220 Business (US 220 Bus.) accesses US 220, the southern terminus of I-99, and Altoona.

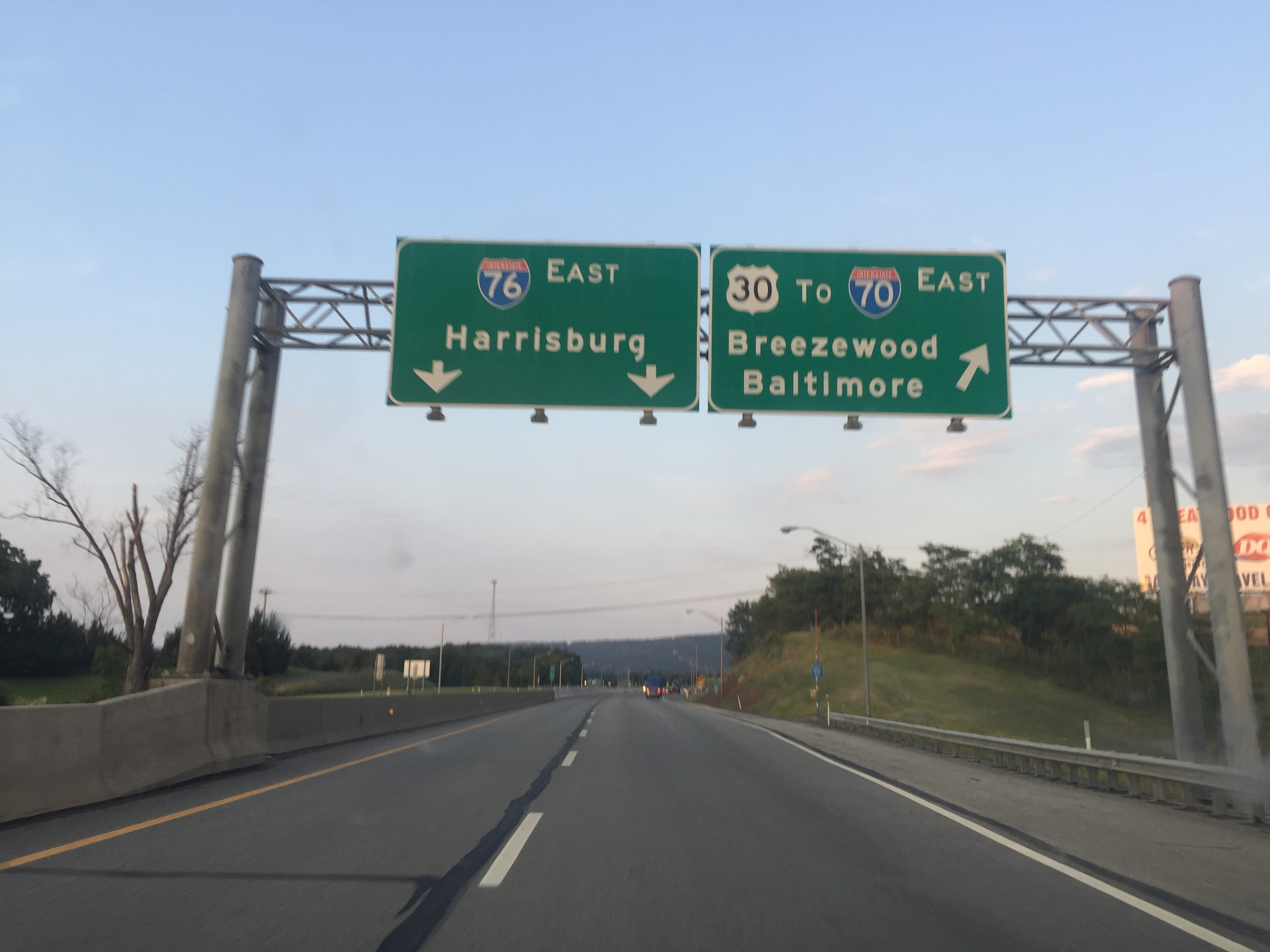
Eastbound at the Breezewood Interchange, where I-70 splits from I-76

It passes through the Narrows, a 650-foot-wide (200 m) gap in Evitts Mountain east of Bedford, with US 30 and the Raystown Branch Juniata River. The turnpike winds through a valley south of the river before traversing Clear Ridge Cut near Everett. In Breezewood, I-70 leaves the turnpike at an interchange with US 30 with some of the only traffic lights on an interstate highway.

The turnpike then heads northeast across Rays Hill into Fulton County, with a third eastbound lane while ascending the hill. The road continues east across Sideling Hill, with a third westbound lane, before narrowing to two westbound lanes and coming to an interchange with US 522 in Fort Littleton and paralleling US 522 before curving east into Huntingdon County. It goes under Tuscarora Mountain through a tunnel into Franklin County, curving northeast into a valley to the PA 75 exit in Willow Hill.

The road then passes under Kittatinny Mountain through the Kittatinny Mountain Tunnel before entering the tunnel under Blue Mountain. The turnpike heads northeast along the base of Blue Mountain to an exit for PA 997, where it becomes six lanes wide, and enters Cumberland County, heading east through the Cumberland Valley on a stretch known as "the straightaway". It then reaches Carlisle and an interchange with US 11, accessing I-81. At this point, the highway narrows to four lanes.

=== Philadelphia Extension ===
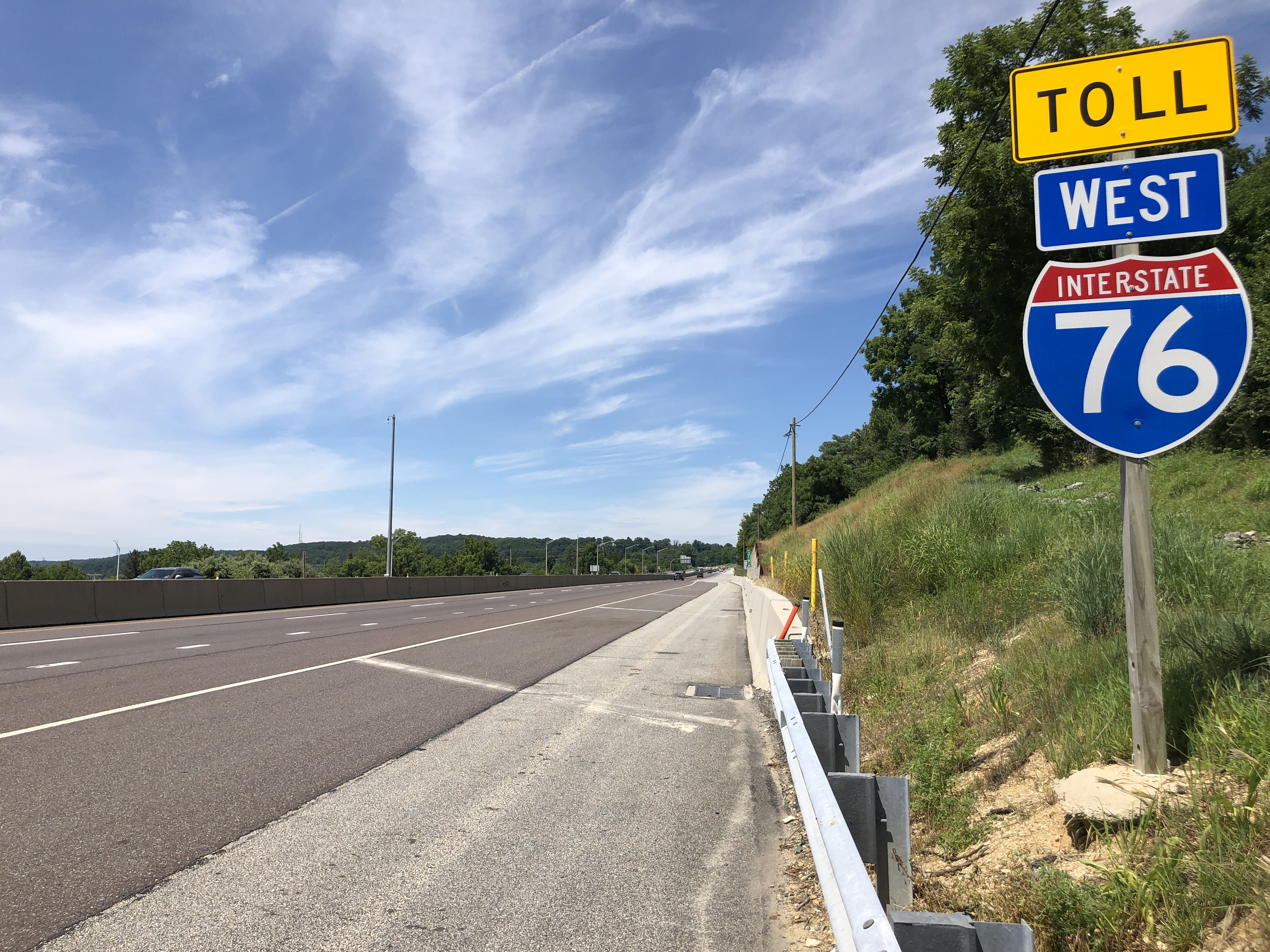
Westbound, past the SR 29 Interchange in Charlestown Township

The turnpike heads east through a mixture of rural land and suburban development approaching Harrisburg, passing over Norfolk Southern's Shippensburg Secondary rail line. In Upper Allen Township, the US 15 interchange accesses Gettysburg on the south and Harrisburg on the north. The road passes over Norfolk Southern's Lurgan Branch rail line before entering York County and the interchange with I-83 serving Harrisburg, its western suburbs, and York on the south.

East of I-83, the turnpike widens to six lanes and crosses over Norfolk Southern's Port Road Branch rail line, the Susquehanna River, Amtrak's Keystone Corridor rail line, and Norfolk Southern's Royalton Branch rail line on the Susquehanna River Bridge. In Dauphin County, the road is a bypass south of Harrisburg.

An interchange with the southern end of I-283 and the western end of PA 283 serves Harrisburg's eastern suburbs in Lower Swatara Township and Harrisburg International Airport; PTC headquarters are adjacent to the interchange. The road returns to four lanes through suburban development north of Middletown, passing over the Middletown and Hummelstown Railroad and Swatara Creek into rural areas. and crossing a corner of Lebanon County before entering Lancaster County.

The highway passes through Pennsylvania Dutch Country to an interchange with PA 72, accessing Lebanon on the north and Lancaster on the south. It passes over an East Penn Railroad line in Denver before an indirect interchange with US 222, which serves Reading and Lancaster. The route continues into Berks County to an interchange with the southern terminus of I-176 (a freeway to Reading) and PA 10 in Morgantown which accesses PA 23.

The turnpike enters Chester County, running southeast to an exit for PA 100 north of Downingtown and the western suburbs of Philadelphia; an interchange with PA 29 is near Malvern. The turnpike continues east to the eastbound Valley Forge Service Plaza, then widens to six lanes before entering Montgomery County. The turnpike crosses over US 422 before reaching the Valley Forge Interchange in King of Prussia, where I-76 splits from the turnpike and heads southeast as the Schuylkill Expressway toward Philadelphia; this interchange also accesses US 202 and US 422.

=== Delaware River Extension ===
Interstate 276
- Location: Upper Merion Township–Bristol Township
- Length: 29.78 mi (47.93 km)
- Existed: 1964–present

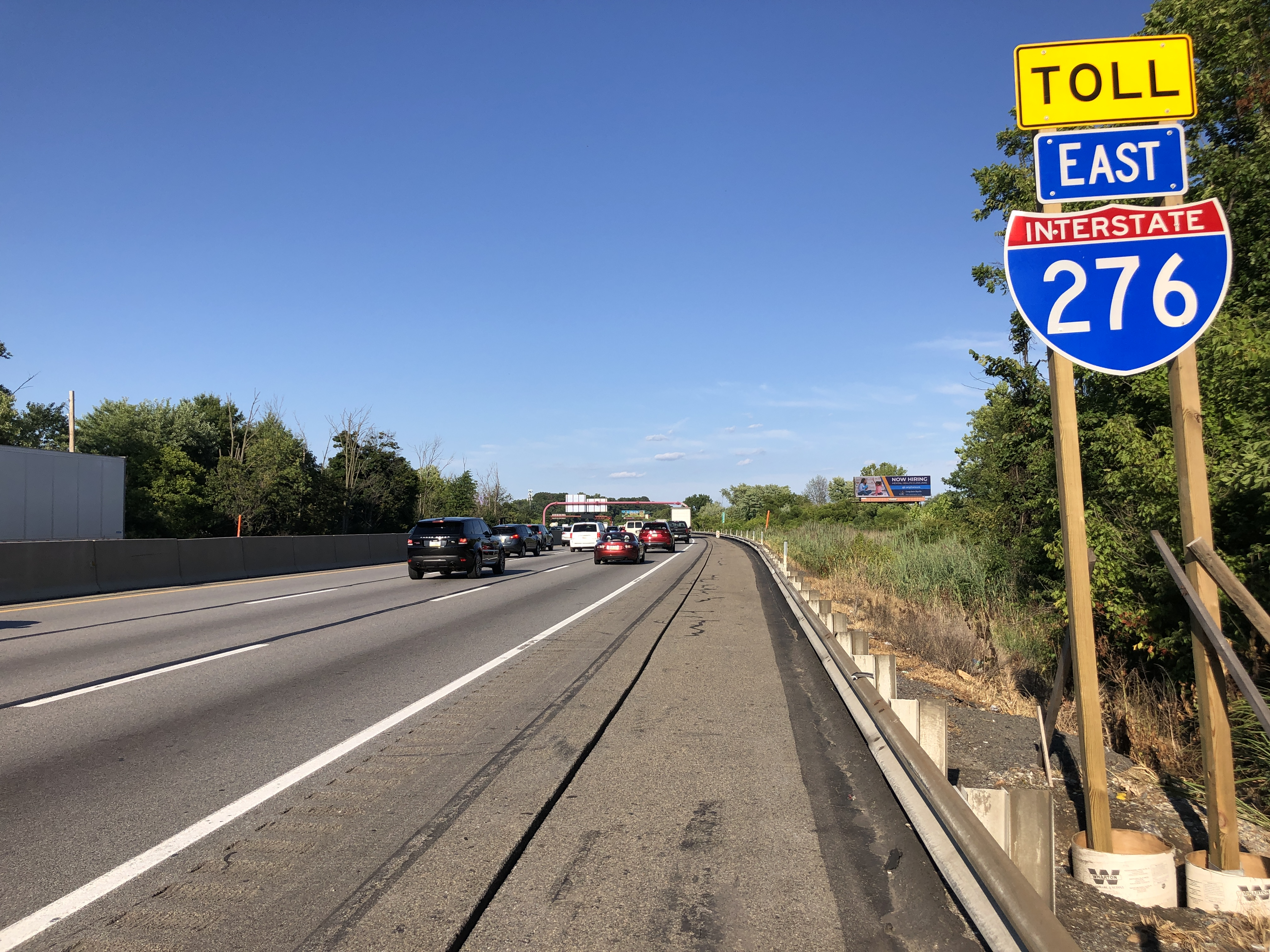
Eastbound, past the Mid-County Interchange with I-476 in Plymouth Meeting

At the Valley Forge Interchange, the turnpike becomes I-276 and also becomes a suburban commuter highway. It crosses a bridge over SEPTA's Norristown High Speed Line and runs parallel to Norfolk Southern's Dale Secondary rail line, south of the road. The turnpike crosses Norfolk Southern's Harrisburg Line, the Schuylkill River, and SEPTA's Manayunk/Norristown Line on the Schuylkill River Bridge near Norristown. The road crosses the Schuylkill River Trail and Norfolk Southern's Morrisville Connecting Track on the Schuylkill River Bridge before the parallel Dale Secondary rail line runs south.

In Plymouth Meeting, an interchange with Germantown Pike accesses Norristown before the Mid-County Interchange. This interchange connects to I-476, which runs south as the Mid-County Expressway (locally known as the Blue Route) and north as the Northeast Extension connecting the mainline to the Lehigh Valley and the Pocono Mountains.

After the Mid-County Interchange, the mainline runs east through Philadelphia's northern suburbs. In Fort Washington, it passes over SEPTA's Lansdale/Doylestown Line before an interchange with PA 309. The road then parallels Norfolk Southern's Morrisville Line, a short distance south. One mile (1.6 km) later is a westbound exit and entrance for Virginia Drive. In Willow Grove, it reaches the PA 611 exit before crossing SEPTA's Warminster Line. The turnpike continues through suburban areas, entering Bucks County and a bridge over Norfolk Southern's Morrisville Line before crossing SEPTA's West Trenton Line. In Bensalem Township is a bridge over CSX's Trenton Subdivision rail line before an interchange with US 1, which accesses Philadelphia.

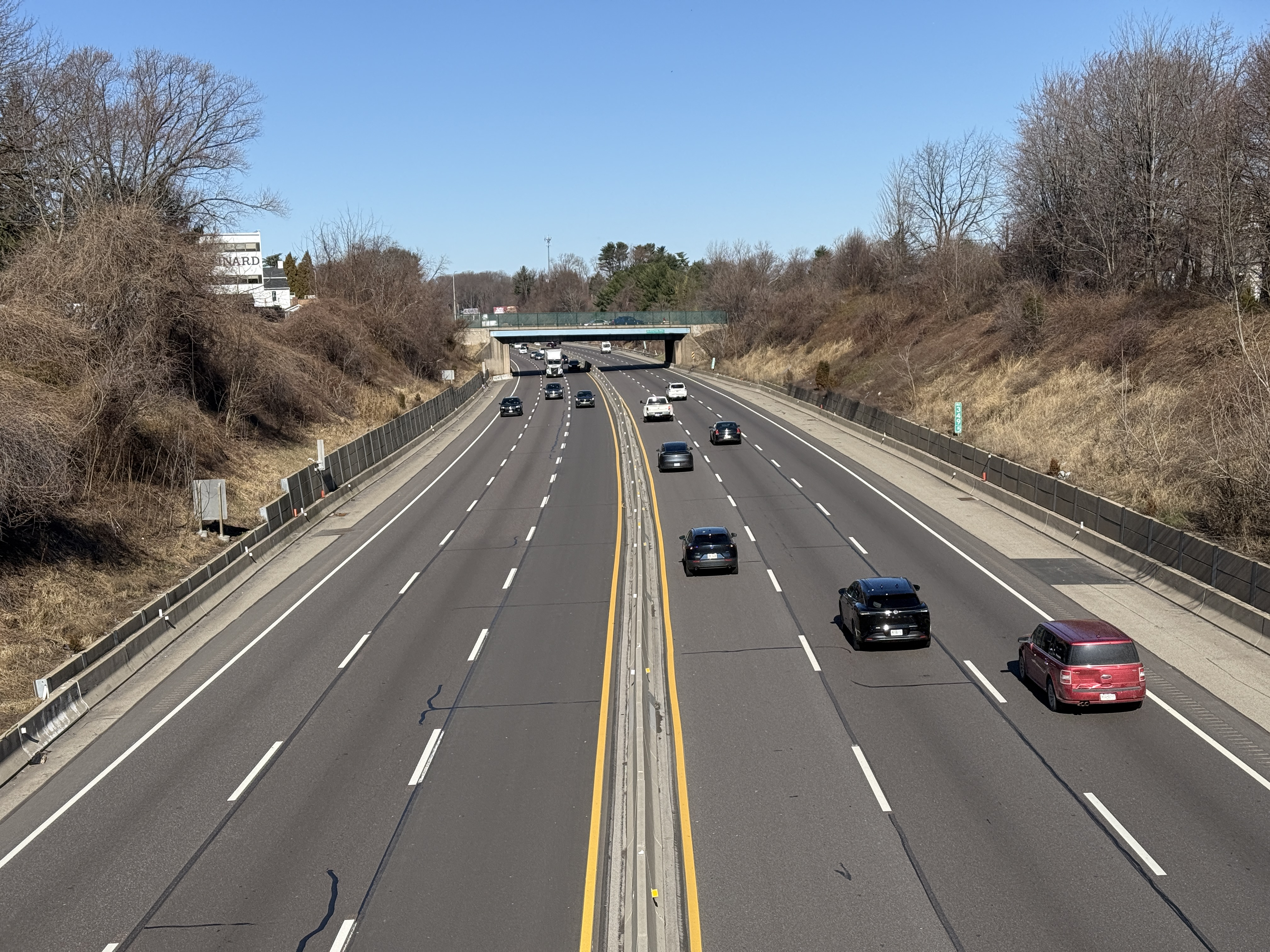
Westbound in Lower Southampton Township

The highway returns to four lanes before an eastbound exit and entrance for PA 132. It then reaches the east end of the closed toll system at the Neshaminy Falls toll gantry. The road reaches a partial interchange with I-95, where it crosses under I-295; access is from the westbound turnpike to southbound I-95 and from northbound I-95 to the eastbound turnpike. At this point, I-276 ends and the turnpike becomes part of I-95; signage indicates the westbound turnpike as a left exit from southbound I-95, using I-95 milepost exit number 40.

After joining I-95, the remaining three miles (4.8 km) of road uses I-95's mileposts and exit numbers and is not signed as the Pennsylvania Turnpike (although it is still considered part of the mainline). The turnpike reaches its final interchange, accessing US 13 near Bristol. The road crosses an East Penn Railroad line before the westbound all-electronic Delaware River Bridge toll gantry. It crosses the Delaware Canal and Amtrak's Northeast Corridor rail line before crossing the Delaware River into New Jersey on the Delaware River–Turnpike Toll Bridge. The Pennsylvania Turnpike ends and I-95 continues east (north) as the Pearl Harbor Memorial Extension of the New Jersey Turnpike, which connects to the mainline New Jersey Turnpike.

=== Major bridges and tunnels ===
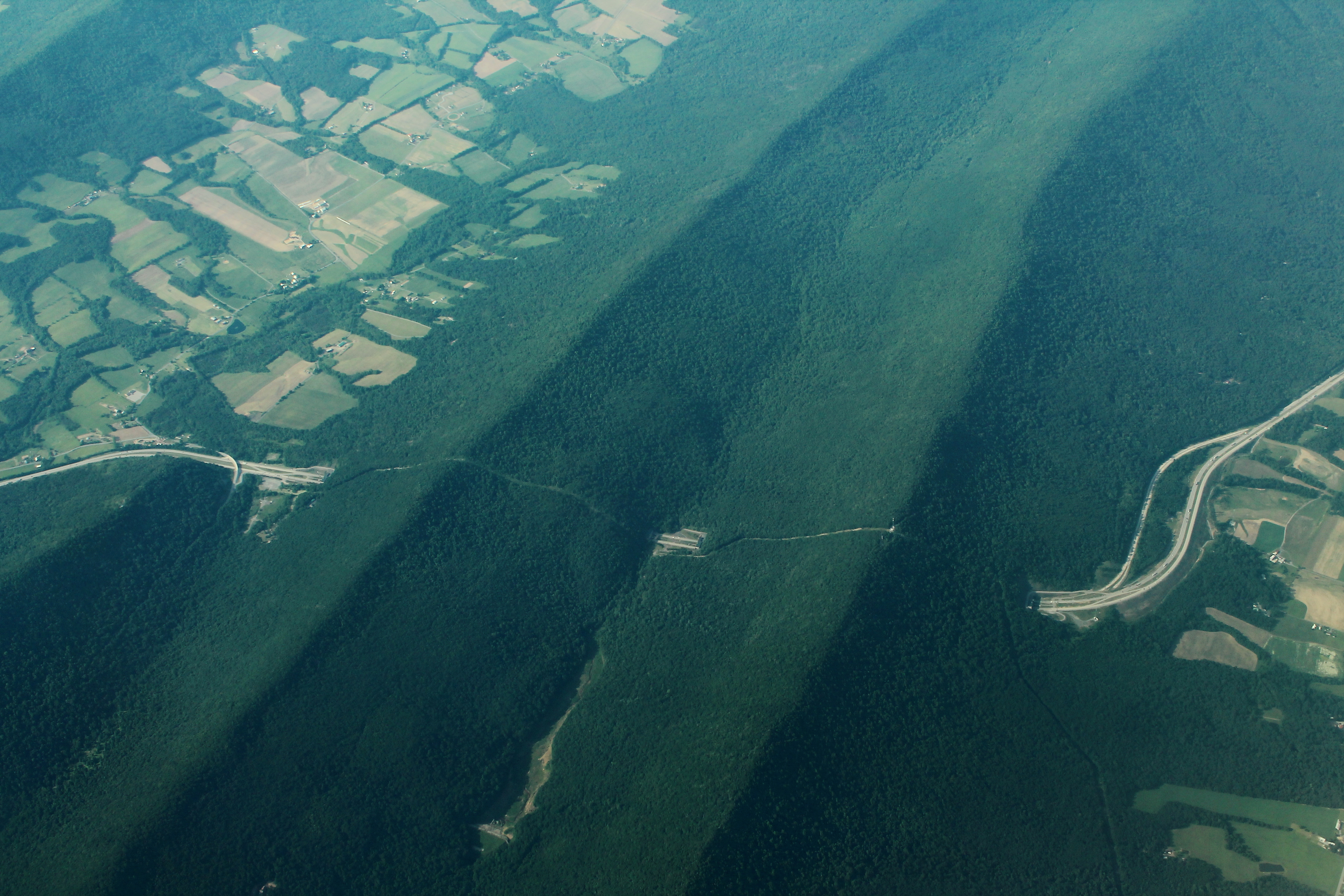
Aerial view of the Blue Mountain and Kittatinny Mountain tunnels. The six-degree curve near the Blue Mountain Tunnel eastern portal was replaced during the early 2010s.

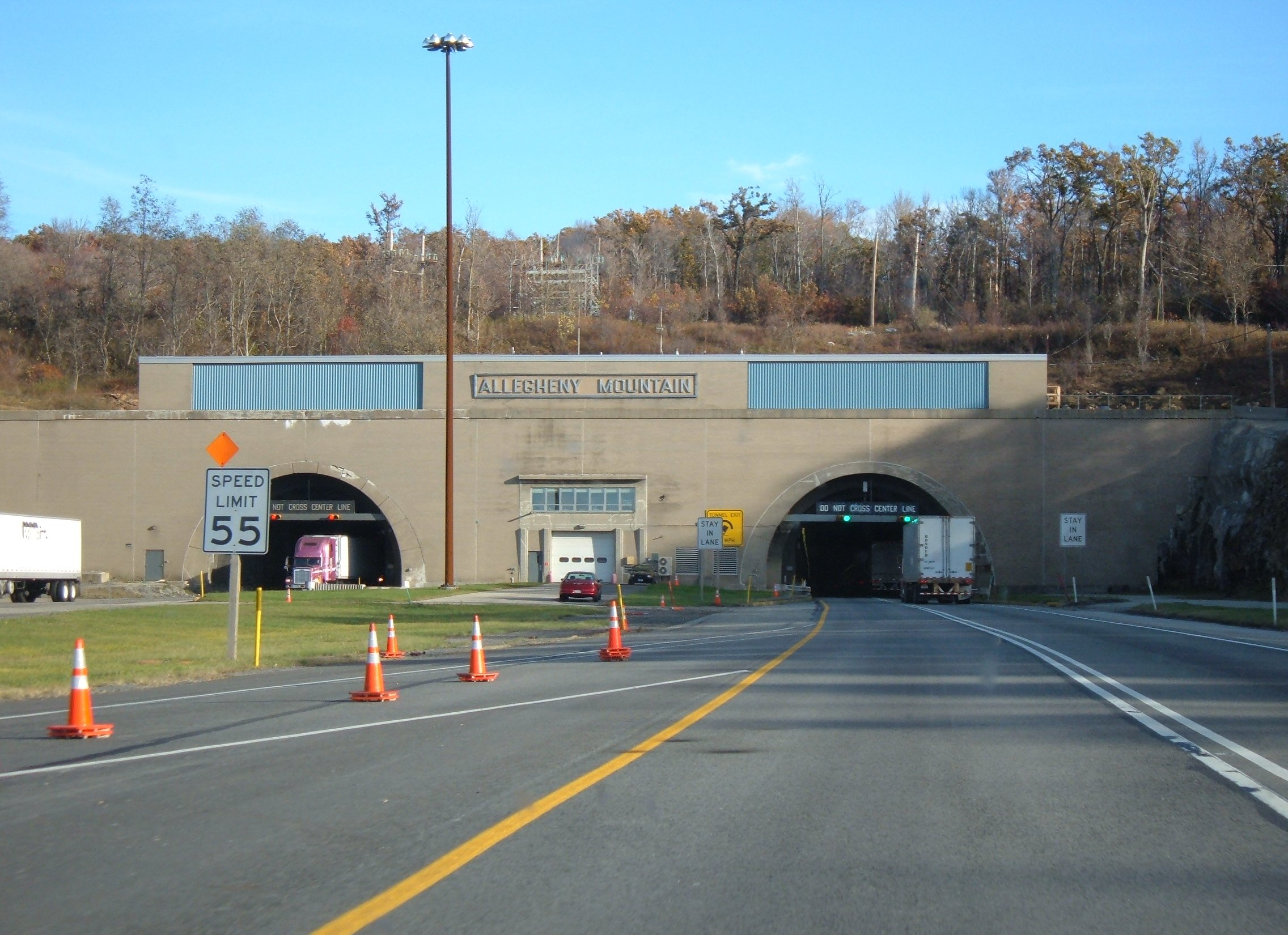
West portal of the Allegheny Mountain Tunnel

The turnpike has several major bridges and tunnels. Four tunnels cross central Pennsylvania's Appalachian Mountains. The 6,070-foot (1,850 m) Allegheny Mountain Tunnel passes under Allegheny Mountain in Somerset County. The Tuscarora Mountain Tunnel runs beneath Tuscarora Mountain at the border of Huntingdon and Franklin counties, and is 5,236 feet (1,596 m) long. The Kittatinny Mountain and Blue Mountain tunnels are adjacent to each other in Franklin County and are 4,727 feet (1,441 m) and 4,339 feet (1,323 m) long, respectively. The turnpike had also traveled through the Laurel Hill Tunnel, Sideling Hill Tunnel, and Rays Hill Tunnel; they were replaced during the 1960s as they were obsolete.

Five bridges carry the turnpike over major rivers. The 1,545-foot-long (471 m) Beaver River Bridge, which is being replaced, crosses the Beaver River in Beaver County. The highway crosses the Allegheny River in Allegheny County on the 2,350-foot-long (720 m) Allegheny River Turnpike Bridge, which replaced a 1951 deck truss bridge with the same name. It crosses the Susquehanna River between York and Dauphin Counties on the 5,910-foot-long (1,800 m) Susquehanna River Bridge, which also replaced an early-1950s deck truss bridge. The turnpike crosses the Schuylkill River on the 1,224-foot-long (373 m) Schuylkill River Bridge in Montgomery County, which was twinned in the 2000s. At the New Jersey state line in Bucks County, the highway is connected to the Pearl Harbor Memorial Extension of the New Jersey Turnpike by the 6,571-foot-long (2,003 m) Delaware River–Turnpike Toll Bridge over the Delaware River.

== Tolls ==
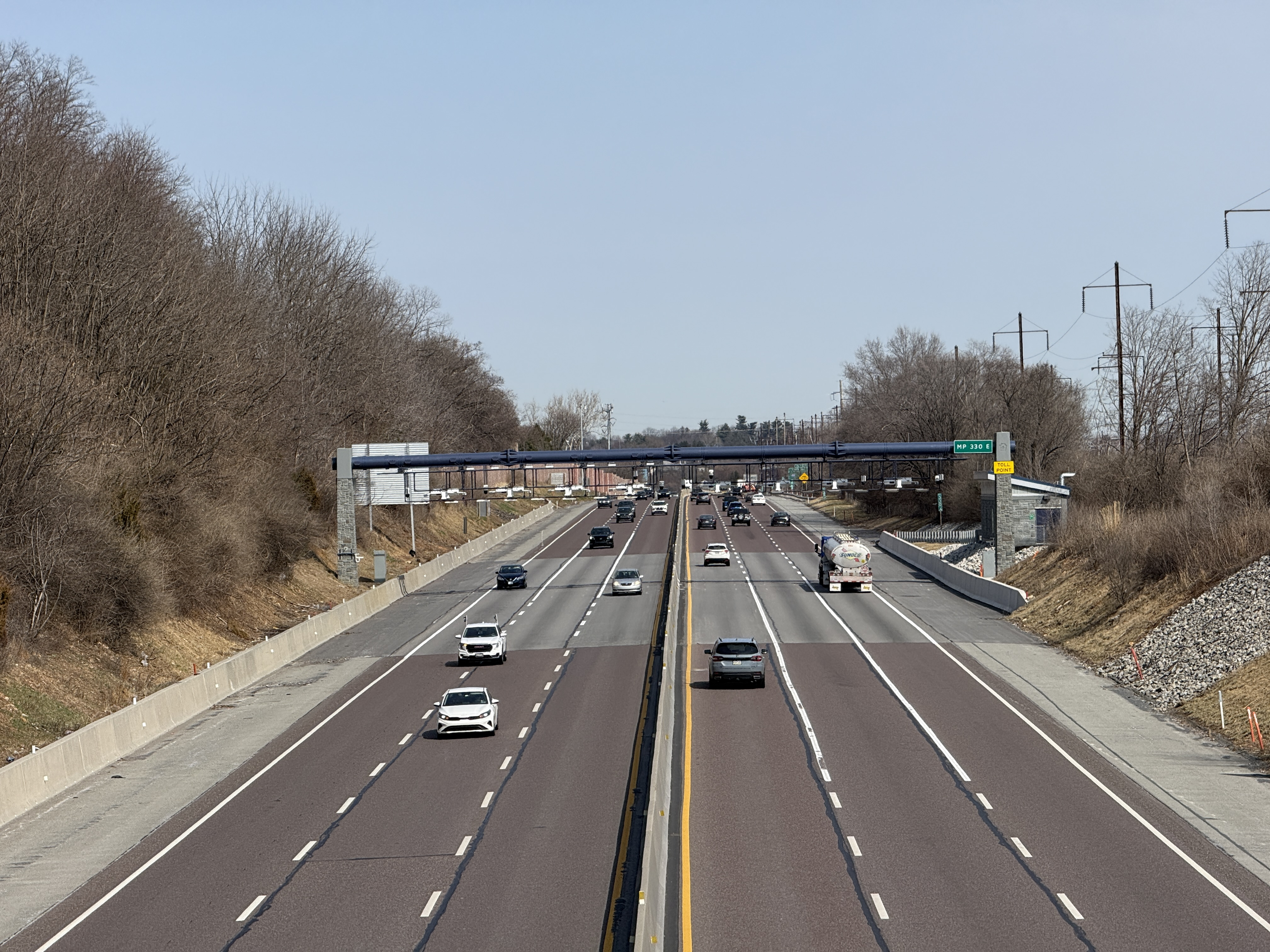
Mainline all-electronic toll gantry in Upper Merion Township

The turnpike uses all-electronic tolling, with toll by plate (which uses automatic license-plate recognition and mails a bill to the vehicle owner) or E-ZPass. Between the mainline Warrendale and Neshaminy Falls toll barriers, tolls are based on distance traveled. An eastbound mainline toll gantry is at Gateway (near the Ohio state line), and a westbound mainline toll gantry is at the Delaware River Bridge near the New Jersey state line; both charging a flat toll. No toll is collected for journeys between the New Castle and Cranberry Interchanges and between Neshaminy Falls and the Delaware River Bridge.

As of 2026, it costs $109.12 for a passenger vehicle to travel the length of the mainline turnpike between Warrendale and Neshaminy Falls using toll by plate and $54.56 using E-ZPass; the eastbound Gateway toll gantry charges $16.60 with toll by plate and $8.20 with E-ZPass for passenger vehicles, and the westbound Delaware River Bridge toll gantry charges $10.60 for toll by plate and $7.98 for E-ZPass. The turnpike has raised tolls each January 1 since 2009 to fund mandated Act 44 annual payments to the Pennsylvania Department of Transportation (PennDOT).

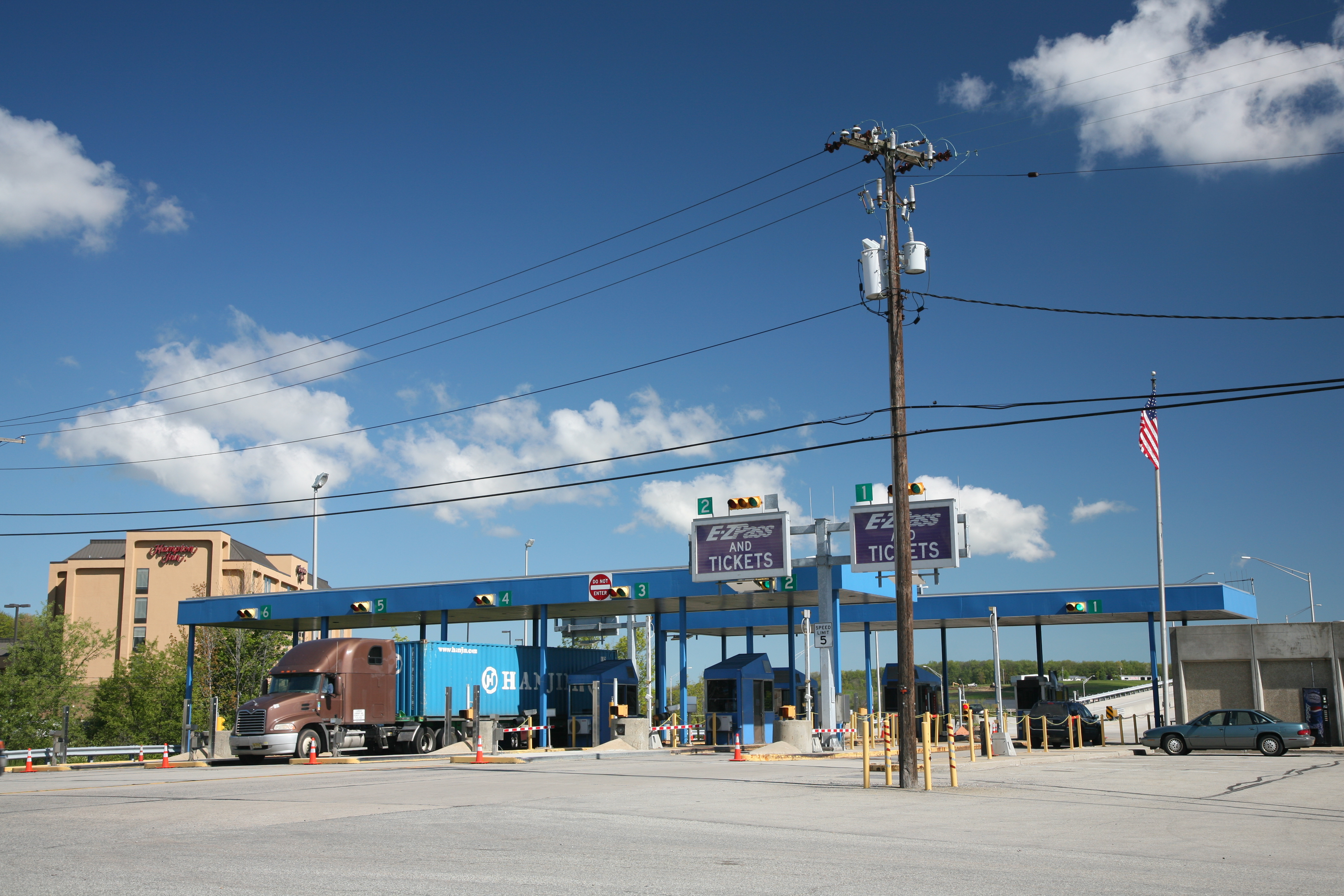
Toll plaza at the Somerset Interchange before conversion to all-electronic tolling

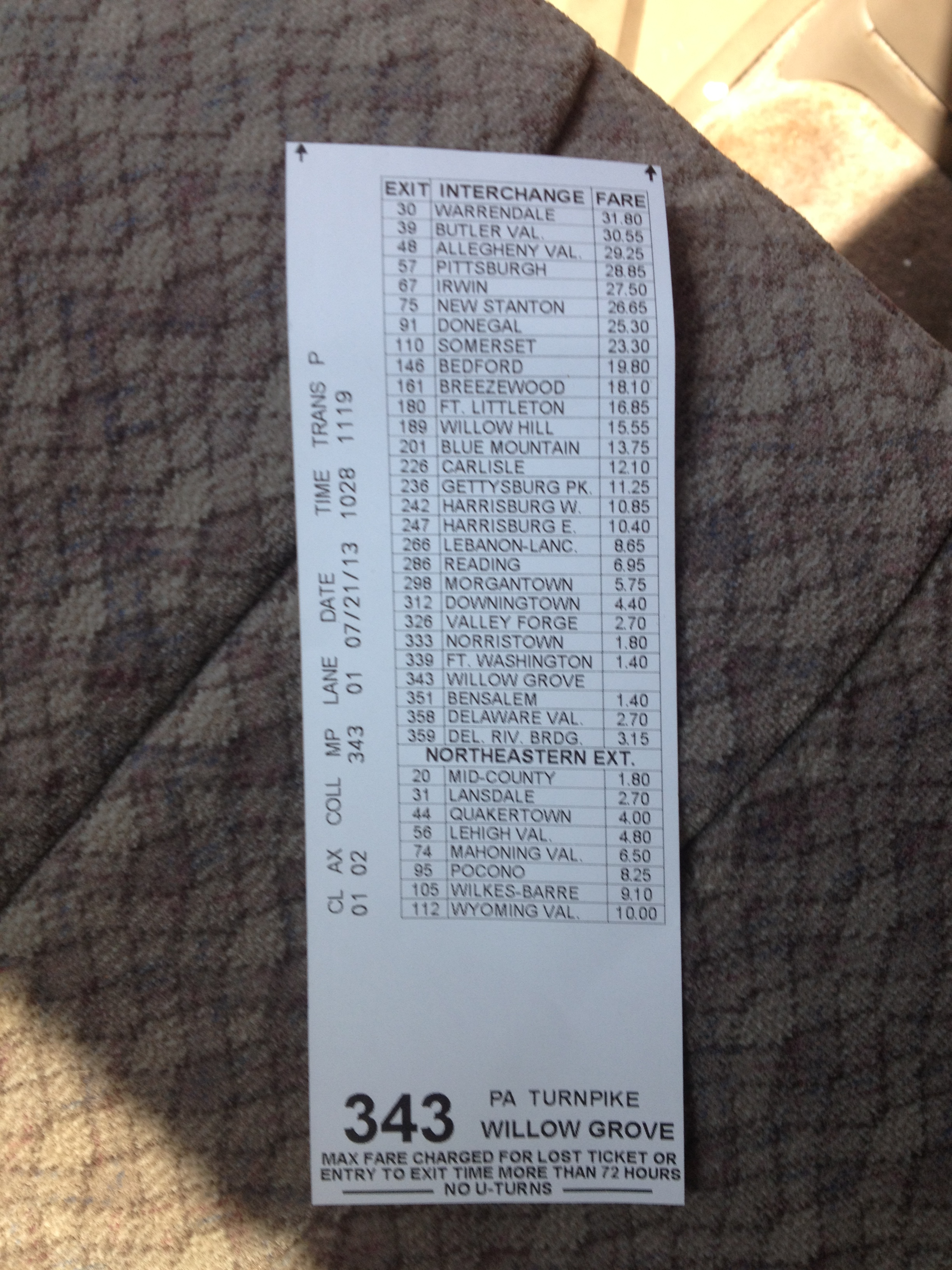
A toll ticket received at the Willow Grove Interchange in 2013

Until March 2020, the turnpike used a ticket system between Warrendale and Neshaminy Falls. Motorists received a ticket listing the toll for each exit; the ticket was surrendered when exiting, and the applicable toll was paid. If the ticket was lost, motorists were charged the maximum toll for that exit. Cash, credit cards, and E-ZPass were accepted at toll plazas.

In 2010, McCormick Taylor and Wilbur Smith Associates were hired to conduct a feasibility study on converting the road to electronic tolls. On March 6, 2012, the turnpike commission announced that it was implementing the plan. The turnpike commission projected that it would save $65 million annually in labor costs by eliminating toll collectors. On January 3, 2016, electronic tolling was introduced at the westbound Delaware River Bridge mainline toll plaza, and the eastern terminus of the ticket system was moved from the Delaware River Bridge to Neshaminy Falls. On October 27, 2019, electronic tolling was implemented at the eastbound Gateway mainline toll plaza. Electronic tolling was originally scheduled to be implemented on the entire length of the turnpike in late 2021.

By 2020, about 86 percent of turnpike vehicles already used E-ZPass for payment of tolls. In March 2020, the switch to electronic tolling was made early as a result of the COVID-19 pandemic. The electronic tolling system used toll booths at exits until toll gantries between interchanges were built. The first toll gantries on the Northeast Extension and on the mainline east of the Reading Interchange began operation in January 2025, and the remainder of the toll gantries along the western portion of the turnpike are expected to begin operation by late 2026. After all toll gantries are fully operating, the PTC plans to demolish all toll plazas.

=== Act 44, Act 89, and toll increases ===
Under a 2007 law, Act 44, the Turnpike has been mandated to provide $450 million, a sizable share of its revenue, annually to the Commonwealth of Pennsylvania and the Department of Transportation for transit and other purposes. The PTC, which previously had raised tolls only six times in 64 years, began to increase tolls every January 1. Its debt increased to be about equal to the entire General Obligation debt of the state. Under Act 89 of 2013, the $450 million payments were to be reduced to $50 million in 2022. But the Turnpike still must work off the debt, all of which is in 30-year bonds, and so annual toll increases will continue for many years.

An analysis by Australian insurance company Budget Direct found the Pennsylvania Turnpike the world's most expensive toll road. Turnpike spokesperson Carl DeFebo disputed Budget Direct's claim, saying that the analysis looked at all of the turnpike's toll roads together; "Nobody would ever go south towards Pittsburgh, east towards Philadelphia, then north towards Scranton. That's a 400-plus mile trip", and turnpike tolls are comparable to other toll roads on a per-mile basis.

== Services ==
=== Emergency assistance and information ===
Motorists needing assistance can dial *11 on mobile phones. First-responder service is available to all turnpike users via the GEICO Safety Patrol program. The free program checks for disabled motorists, debris and accidents along the road, and provides assistance 24 hours daily year-round. Each patrol vehicle covers a 20-to-25-mile (32 to 40 km) stretch of the turnpike. Towing service is available from authorized service stations near the highway, and Pennsylvania State Police Troop T patrols the turnpike. The troop's headquarters is in Highspire, and its turnpike substations are grouped into two sections. The western section has substations in Gibsonia, New Stanton, Somerset and Everett; the eastern section has mainline substations in Newville, Bowmansville and King of Prussia. The PTC broadcasts AM road, traffic, and weather conditions from highway advisory radio transmitters at each exit on 1640 kHz, with a range of approximately two miles (3.2 km). The 511PA travel-information service provides alerts, an interactive map, weather information and traffic cameras to motorists, and variable-message signs located along the roadway provide information such as accidents, construction, weather, and traffic congestion.

=== Service plazas ===
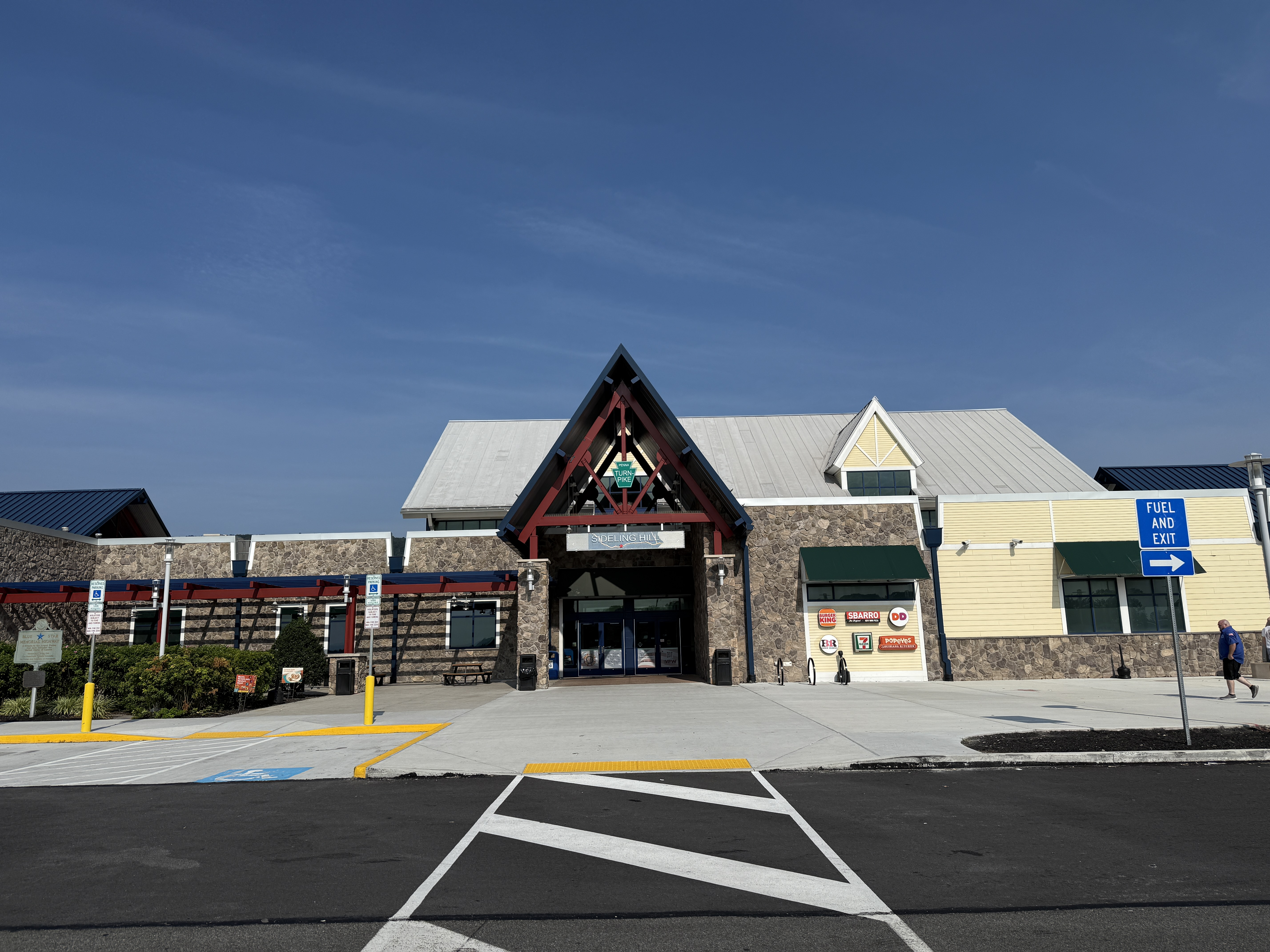
Sideling Hill service plaza

The turnpike currently has 15 high capacity service plazas, though at one point had over 20 lower capacity plazas. Each plaza has several fast-food restaurants, a Sunoco gas station, and a 7-Eleven convenience store. Other amenities include ATMs, E-ZPass sales, free cellphone charging, Pennsylvania Lottery sales, picnic areas, restrooms, tourist information, Travel Board information centers, and Wi-Fi. The King of Prussia plaza has a welcome center, and the New Stanton and Sideling Hill plazas have seasonal farmers' markets. Several plazas offer E85 fuel, and New Stanton offers compressed natural gas; all have conventional gasoline and diesel fuel. Some plazas have electric vehicle charging stations. The Sunoco and 7-Eleven locations and the Subway at North Midway are operated by 7-Eleven, and the remaining restaurants and general upkeep are operated by Applegreen.

By 1946, a number of service plazas were expanded in order to accommodate booming popularity.

With the opening of the extensions between 1950 and 1954, new service plazas came as well. On them, the service plazas were less frequent, larger, and further from the road. Gulf Oil operated service stations on the extensions, and Howard Johnson's provided food service in sit-down restaurants.

In 1955, the North and South Somerset Service Plazas were both opened, replacing the eastbound only New Baltimore Plaza.

In 1957, the westbound New Stanton service plaza was built, and the Laurel Hill Plaza, located to the west of the western end of the Laurel Hill Tunnel, was closed.

In 1968, the Sideling Hill Plaza opened with the Sideling Hill/Rays Hill bypass. It is the only service plaza on the mainline turnpike to serve both eastbound and westbound traffic, and replaced the westbound only Cove Valley Plaza, which was demolished due to being located on the section of turnpike being bypassed.

In preparation of the United States Bicentennial, construction was completed in 1976 of a 320 space parking lot at the eastbound only Valley Forge plaza.

The Pleasant Valley plaza was closed in January 1979, while the Denver and Mechanicsburg plazas closed in 1980. All three were auctioned in October 1981, having been experiencing diminishing profits. This left only the Oakmont Plum, Butler, and Zelienople service plazas in western Pennsylvania.

In 1978, as Howard Johnson's exclusive contract to provide food service was ending, the turnpike commission entertained bids; Aramark was awarded a food-service contract at two plazas. The turnpike was the first toll road in the U.S. to have more than one fast-food chain at its service plazas. Gas stations were operated by Gulf Oil, Exxon, and ARCO. In 1980, Hardee's opened restaurants at the service plazas to compete with Howard Johnson's. The turnpike was the world's first road to offer fast food at its service plazas. Burger King and McDonald's restaurants opened on the turnpike in June 1983, this was part of a deal that saw the eastbound Path Valley plaza closed, it had seen a gradual loss of revenue since the Sideling Hill plazas opening in 1968. With this, fast food was implemented at the Hempfield Plaza. This reflected increased demands for fast food. Marriott Corporation purchased the remaining Howard Johnson's restaurants in 1987, and restaurants such as Roy Rogers and Bob's Big Boy opened.

In April 1990, Gulf Oil LP replaced the turnpike's Exxon stations.

The Brandywine (later Peter J. Camiel) plaza was systematically demolished and rebuilt from September 1990 to May 1991. This was necessary as it was the busiest service plaza on the entire mainline, and as such, increased use of it over time had rendered it obsolete.

Sunoco took over gas-station operations in 1993, outbidding Shell US; credit card-activated pumps, fax machines, ATMs, and informational lodging boards were added. Two years later, a farmers market began at the Sideling Hill plaza.

In March 2002, the Butler plaza was closed so it could be replaced by the Warrendale Toll Plaza. Two years later, the Somerset Service Plaza was expanded.

The eastbound-only Hempfield and South Neshaminy plazas were closed in 2007 for a six-lane widening and new slip ramp, respectively.

The eastbound Zelienople plaza closed in 2008 due to being a money loser since the portion between the Gateway Toll Plaza and Warrendale became free in 2003. Some criticized this as a potential tourism reducer.

The North Neshaminy plaza closed in 2010 so its parking lot could be used for construction equipment needed for a planned total reconstruction in the area. Free Wi-Fi was introduced at all service plazas in 2013.

By the mid-2000s, the service plazas, most having been built in the 1950s and some in the 1940s, were functionally obsolete. Because of this, in 2006, the PTC and HMSHost began a system-wide project to reconstruct or renovate all service plazas. The Oakmont Plum plaza was first (closing in 2006 and reopening the following year), and was followed by the reconstruction of the North Somerset and Sideling Hill plazas (2007–2008); New Stanton (2008–2009); King of Prussia (2009–2010); Lawn and Bowmansville (2010–2011); South Somerset, Blue Mountain, and Cumberland Valley (2011–2012); South Midway and Highspire (2012–2013); Peter J. Camiel (2013–2014); and Valley Forge and North Midway (2014–2015).

The Art Sparks program began in 2017 as a partnership between the turnpike commission and the Pennsylvania Council on the Arts to install public art created by local students in the Arts in Education residency program in service plazas along the turnpike over the next five years. The art consists of a mural reflecting a plaza's location. The first Art Sparks mural was unveiled at the Lawn service plaza in May of that year.

Beginning in April 2019, Sunoco/A-Plus locations began conversion to 7-Elevens as part of an agreement for 7-Eleven to take over Sunoco's company-owned convenience stores on the East Coast and in Texas; Sunoco continues to supply fuel.

== History ==
=== Before the turnpike ===
Native Americans used east–west paths that usually traced river valleys and crossed the ridges of the Allegheny Mountains. European settlers followed wagon roads that often followed the same paths. The Philadelphia and Lancaster Turnpike opened between Lancaster and Philadelphia in 1794, the first successful turnpike in the United States. The road was paved with logs laid crosswise to the direction of travel, giving a bumpy ride but an improvement on dirt trails. In 1834, the Main Line of Public Works opened as a system of canals, railroads, and cable railways across Pennsylvania to compete with the Erie Canal in New York.

The Pennsylvania Railroad was completed between Pittsburgh and Philadelphia in 1854. During the 1880s, the South Pennsylvania Railroad was proposed to compete with the Pennsylvania. It was backed by William Henry Vanderbilt, head of the New York Central Railroad (the Pennsylvania's chief rival). Andrew Carnegie also provided financial support, since he was unhappy with the Pennsylvania Railroad rates. Construction began on the rival line in 1883, but stopped when the railroads reached an agreement two years later. After construction halted, the only vestiges of the South Pennsylvania were nine tunnels, some roadbed, and piers for a bridge over the Susquehanna River in Harrisburg.

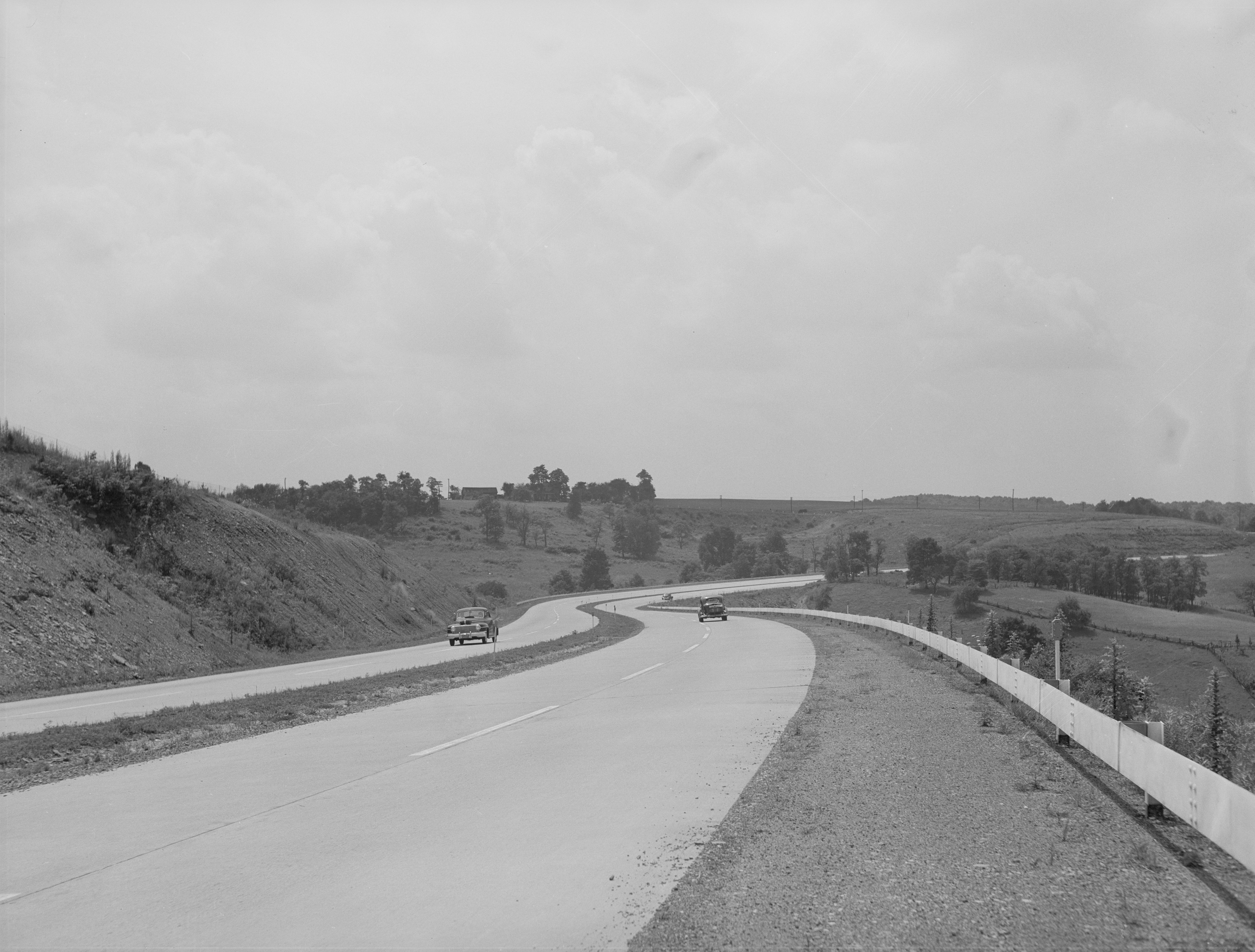
Winding section east of Fort Littleton in 1942

To cross the Pennsylvania mountains by automobile, William Sutherland of the Pennsylvania Motor Truck Association and Victor Lecoq of the Pennsylvania State Planning Commission proposed a toll highway in 1934. The highway would be a four-lane, limited-access road modeled on the German Autobahn and Connecticut's Merritt Parkway. The turnpike could also be a defense road, and construction costs could be reduced by using the abandoned South Pennsylvania Railroad tunnels.

Sutherland and Lecoq introduced their turnpike idea to state legislator Cliff Patterson, who proposed a feasibility study on April 23, 1935. The proposal passed, and the Works Progress Administration (WPA) explored the possibility of building the road. Its study estimated a construction cost of $60 to $70 million (equivalent to between $1.11 billion and $1.29 billion in 2025). Patterson introduced Bill 211 to the legislature, calling for the establishment of the PTC. The bill was signed into law by Governor George Howard Earle III on May 21, 1937, and the first commissioners were appointed on June 4. The highway was planned to run from US 30 in Irwin (east of Pittsburgh) east to US 11 in Middlesex (west of Harrisburg), a length of about 162 miles (261 km). It would pass through nine tunnels along the way.

The road was planned to have four lanes and a median, with no grade steeper than three percent. Access to the highway would be controlled by entrance and exit ramps. There were to be no at-grade intersections, driveways, traffic lights, crosswalks, or at-grade railroad crossings. Curves were to be wide, and road signage large. The turnpike's right of way was to be 200 feet (61 m), and the roadway was to be 24 feet (7.3 m) wide in each direction, with 10-foot (3.0 m) shoulders and a 10-foot (3.0 m) median. It was planned to have two lanes through the tunnels, a 14-foot (4.3 m) clearance, and a 23-foot-wide (7.0 m) roadway. The turnpike's design would be uniform.

In February 1938, the commission began investigating proposals for $55 million in bonds to be issued for construction of the turnpike. A month later, Van Ingen and Company purchased $60 million (equivalent to $1.07 billion in 2025) in bonds which they offered to the public. In April 1938, President Franklin D. Roosevelt approved a $24-million (equivalent to $430 million in 2025) grant from the Works Progress Administration (WPA) for the construction of the road, and the commonwealth contributed $29 million (equivalent to $520 million in 2025) toward the project.

The WPA grant received final approval, but plans were still made to sell bonds, and the first issue was planned for about $20 million (equivalent to $358 million in 2025). The reduced bond issue was due to the WPA grant.

In June, the Reconstruction Finance Corporation (RFC) announced that it would lend the commission sufficient funds to build the road. The RFC loan totaled $32 million (equivalent to $573 million in 2025), with a $26 million (equivalent to $466 million in 2025) grant from the Public Works Administration (PWA); this provided $58 million (equivalent to $1.04 billion in 2025) for the turnpike's construction, and highway tolls would repay the RFC.

In October 1938, the turnpike commission agreed with the RFC and PWA that the RFC would purchase $35 million (equivalent to $627 million in 2025) in bonds in addition to the PWA grant. That month, a banking syndicate purchased the bond amount from the RFC.

In 1940, the highway opened between Irwin and Carlisle, being the first long-distance controlled-access highway in the United States. Other states implemented toll roads in the years after World War II. After the passage of the Federal Aid Highway Act of 1956, new highways were often built as part of the Interstate Highway System rather than as toll roads. The highway was extended east to Valley Forge in 1950, and west to the Ohio state line the following year. It was routed east to the New Jersey state line (the Delaware River) in 1954; the Delaware River Bridge opened two years later, completing the turnpike.

=== Design ===
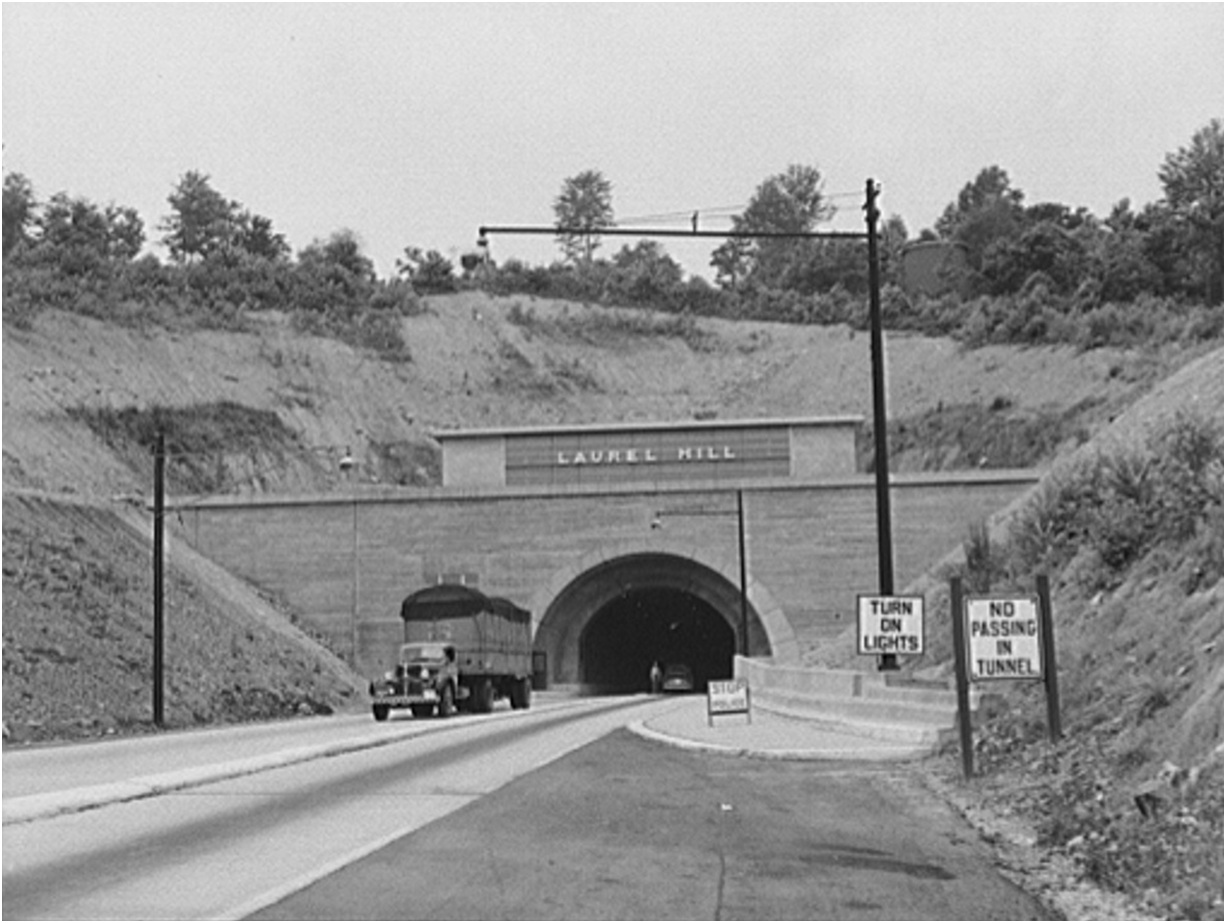
Laurel Hill Tunnel in 1942

To build the turnpike, boring of the former railroad tunnels had to be completed. Since the Allegheny Mountain Tunnel bore was in poor condition, a new bore was drilled 85 feet (26 m) south of it. The commission considered bypassing the Rays Hill and Sideling Hill tunnels, but the cost of a bypass was considered too high. Crews used steam shovels to widen the tunnel portals, and temporary railroad tracks transported construction equipment. Concrete was used to line the tunnel portals. The seven tunnels - which included the Laurel Hill, Tuscarora Mountain, Kittatinny Mountain, and Blue Mountain - featured ventilation ducts, drainage structures, sidewalks, lighting, and telephone and signal systems. Lighting was installed on the roadway approaching the tunnel portals. The tunnels bored through seven mountains, for a combined 4.5 miles (7.2 km) in length, and earned the turnpike the nickname the "tunnel highway".

A number of bridge designs were used to cross the highway, including the concrete arch bridge, the through plate girder bridge, and the concrete T-beam bridge. Bridges used to carry the turnpike over other roads and streams included a concrete arch viaduct in New Stanton; at 600 feet (180 m), it was the longest bridge on the original section of the turnpike. Other turnpike bridges included plate girder bridges, such as the bridge over Dunnings Creek in the Bedford Narrows. Smaller concrete T-beam bridges were also built. A total of 307 bridges were built along the original section of the turnpike.

Eleven interchanges were built, most of which were trumpet interchanges where all ramps merge at the toll booths. Lighting was installed approaching interchanges, along with acceleration and deceleration lanes. The road had guardrails consisting of steel panels attached to I-beams. Large exit signs were used, and road signs had cat's-eye reflectors to increase visibility at night. Billboards were prohibited. In September 1940, the Pennsylvania Public Utility Commission ruled that trucks and buses could use the highway.

Since the turnpike's first section was built through a rural part of the state, food and gasoline were not readily available to motorists. Because of this, the commission decided to provide service plazas at 30-mile (48 km) intervals. The plazas would be made of native fieldstone, resembling Colonial-era architecture. In 1940, Standard Oil of Pennsylvania received a contract for 10 Esso service stations along the turnpike. Eight of the service plazas would consist of service stations and a restaurant, and the plazas at the halfway point (in Bedford) would be larger. The South Midway service plaza (the largest) contained a dining room, lunch counter, lounge, and lodging for truckers; a tunnel connected it to the smaller North Midway plaza. The remaining service plazas were smaller, with a lunch counter. Food service at the plazas was provided by Howard Johnson's. After World War II, the food facilities were enlarged; service stations sold gasoline, repaired cars, and provided towing.

=== Construction and opening ===
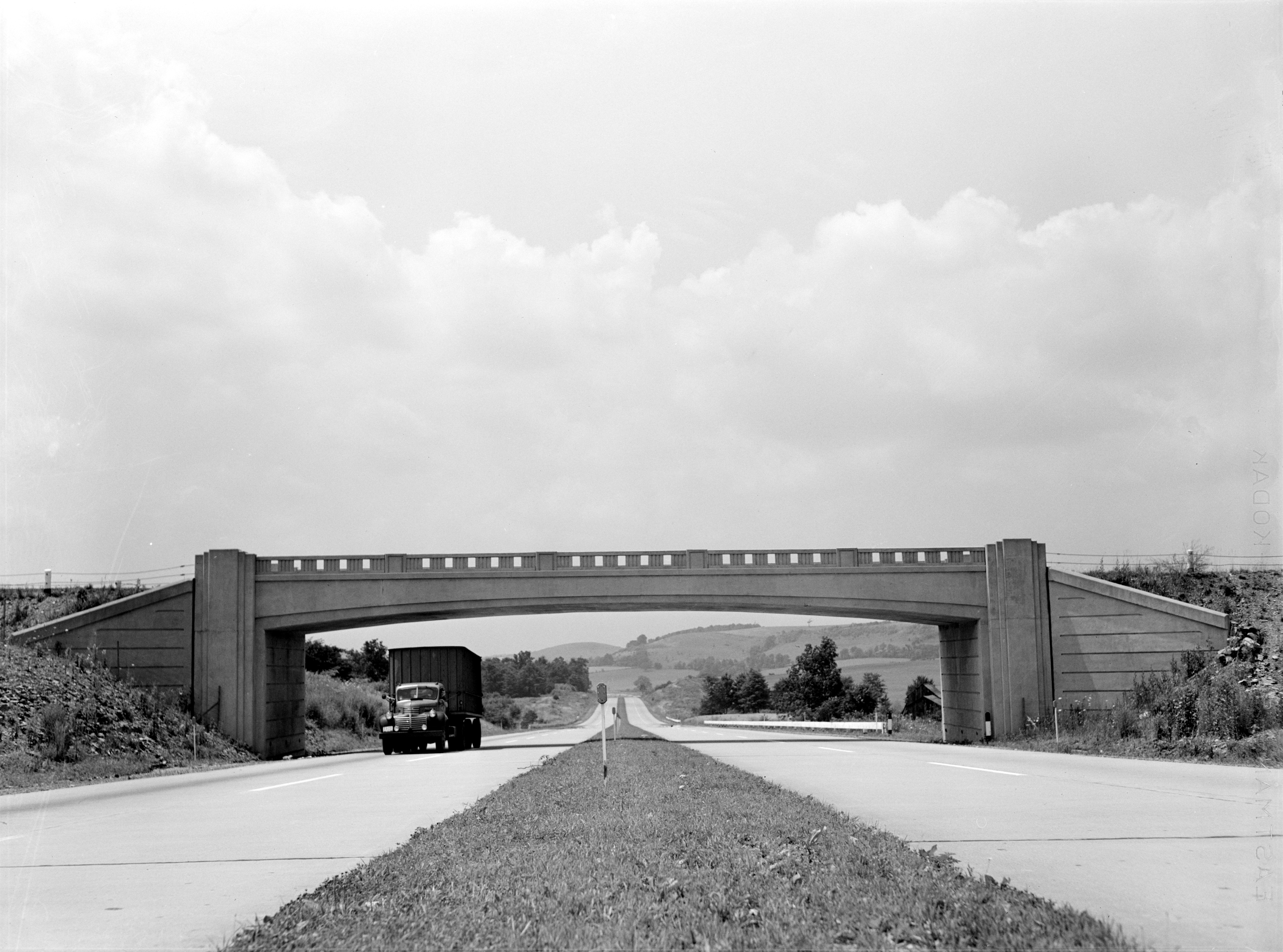
A view of the turnpike at an overpass in 1942

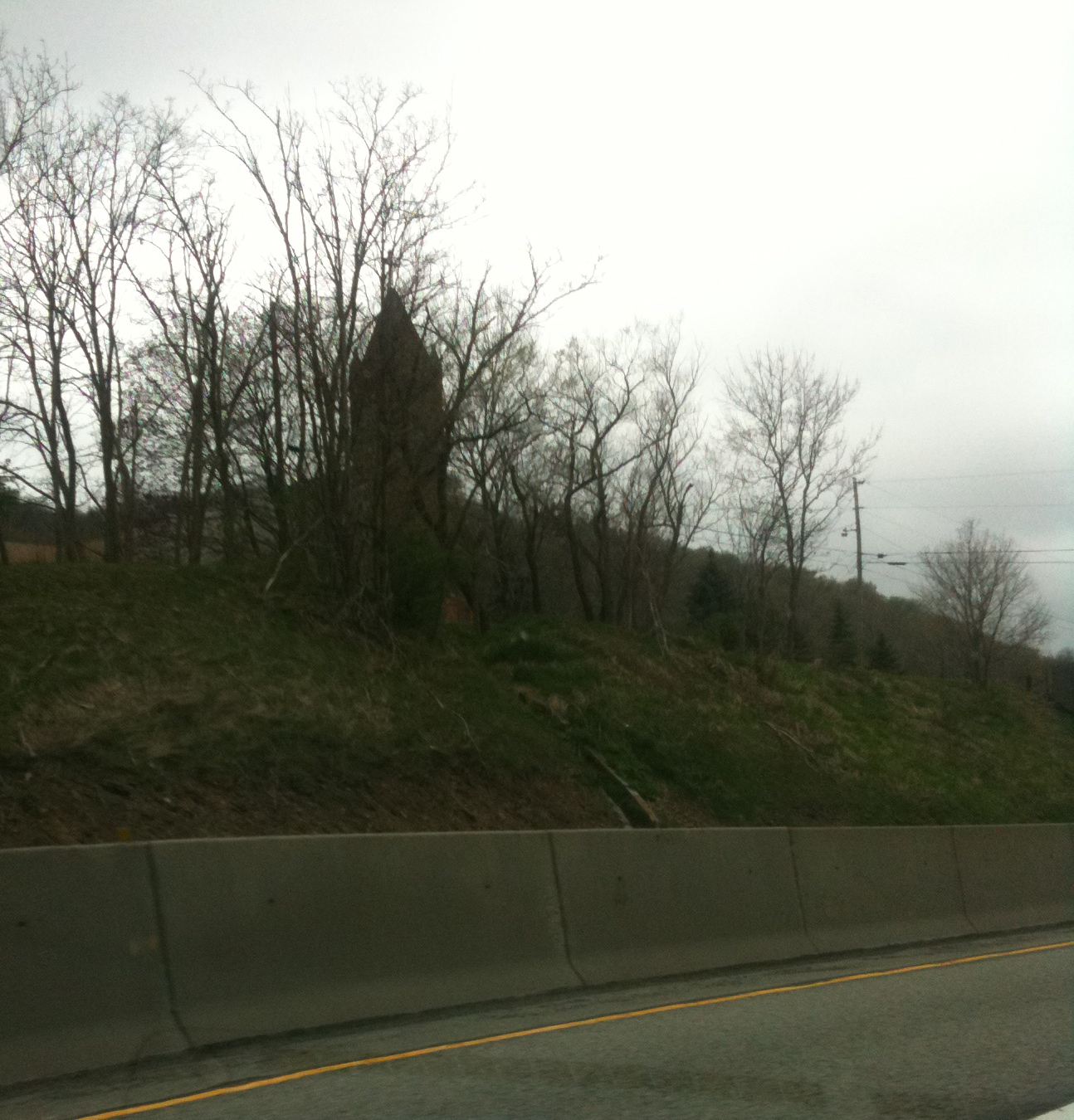
Stairs to St. John's Church in New Baltimore in 2010

Before the first-section groundbreaking, in 1937, the turnpike commission sent workers to assess the former railroad tunnels; in September of that year, a contract was awarded to drain water from them. After this, workers cleared rock slides and vegetation from the tunnel portals before evaluating the nine tunnels' condition. It was decided that six of the nine former South Pennsylvania Railroad tunnels could be used for the roadway. The Allegheny Mountain Tunnel was in too-poor condition for use. Because of this, an entirely new tunnel was bored nearby. However of these nine, it would be more expensive to complete the Quemahoning and Negro Mountain tunnels in comparison to simply building rock cuts to bypass them. As such, they were bypassed in original construction. The Quemahoning Tunnel had been completed and used by the Pittsburgh, Westmoreland and Somerset Railroad.

The turnpike's groundbreaking ceremony was on October 27, 1938, near Carlisle, with commission chair Walter A. Jones thrusting the first shovel into the earth. Construction was on a tight schedule because completion of the road was originally planned by May 1, 1940. After the groundbreaking, contracts for finishing the former South Pennsylvania Railroad tunnels, grading the turnpike's right of way, constructing bridges, and paving were issued. By July 1939, the entire length of the turnpike was under contract.

The first work to begin on the road was grading its right of way, which involved a great deal of earthwork due to the mountainous terrain. The turnpike required the acquisition of homes, farms, and a coal mine by eminent domain. A tunnel was originally planned across Clear Ridge near Everett, but the turnpike commission decided to build a cut into the ridge. Building the cut involved bulldozers excavating the mountain and explosives blasting the rock. Concrete culverts were built to carry streams and roads under the highway in the valley floor. The Clear Ridge cut was 153 feet (47 m) deep (the deepest highway cut in the United States at the time), and was known as "Little Panama" after the Panama Canal. West of Clear Ridge, cuts and fills were built for the turnpike to pass along the southern edge of Earlston.

Considerable work was involved in building the road up the three-percent grade at the east end of Allegheny Mountain, the turnpike's steepest grade. The base of Evitts Mountain was blasted to carry the turnpike across Bedford Narrows with US 30, the Raystown Branch of the Juniata River, and a Pennsylvania Railroad branch line.

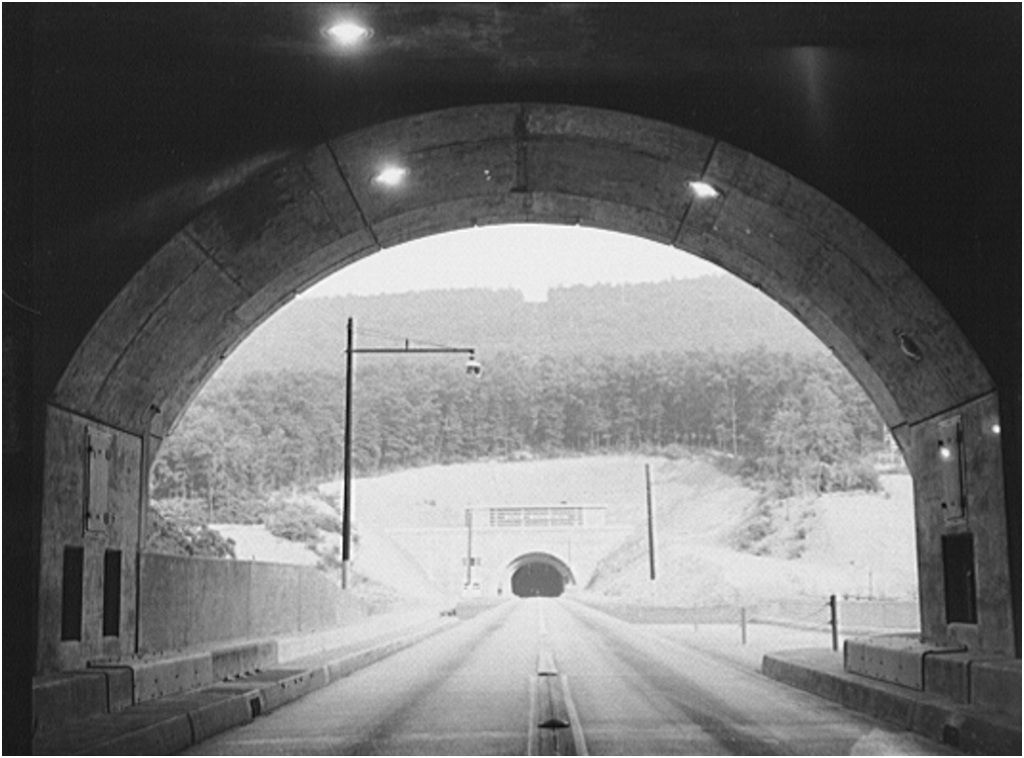
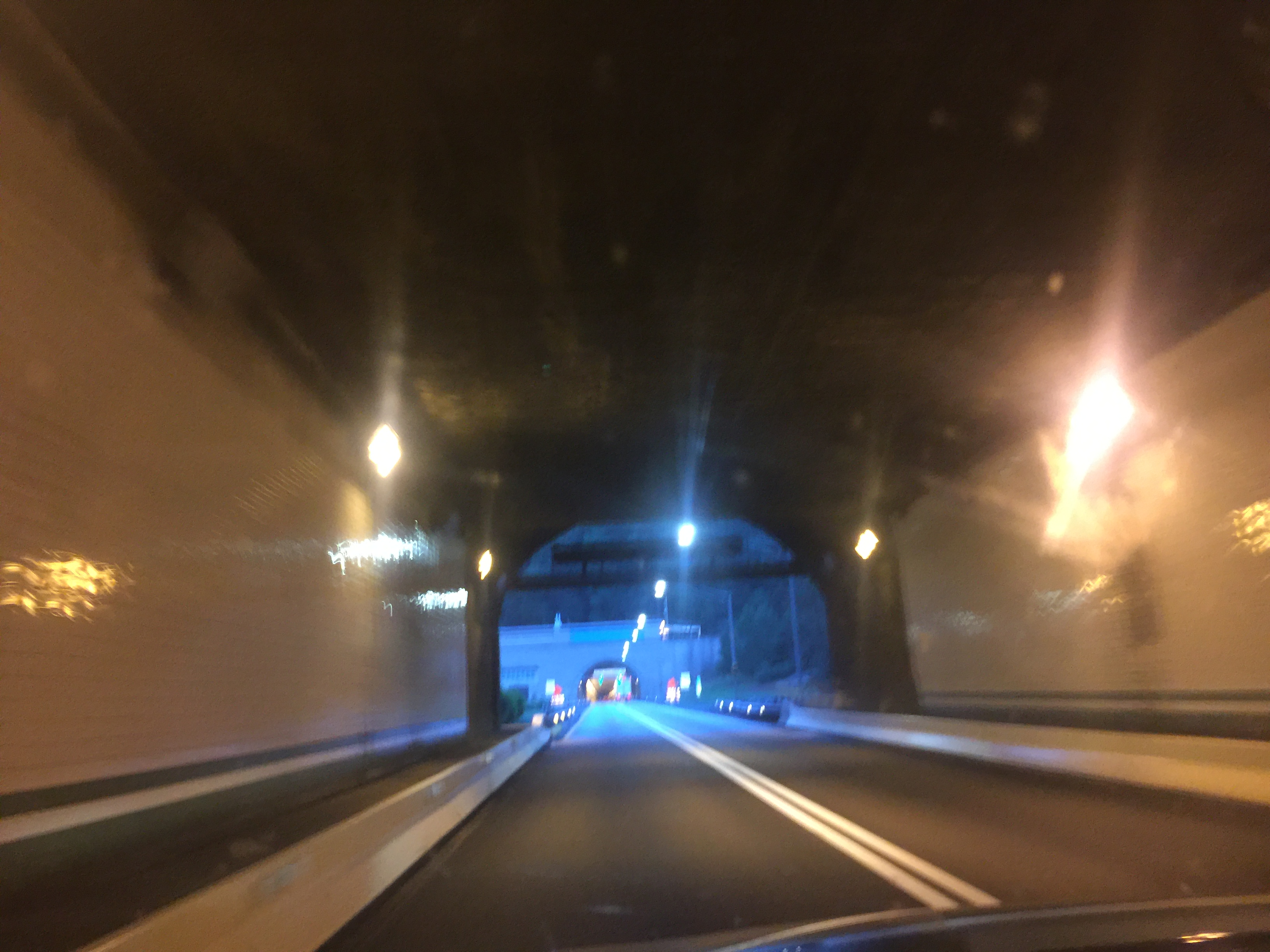
West portal of Blue Mountain Tunnel, viewed from Kittatinny Mountain Tunnel; left photo from 1942; right photo from 2017

Paving began on August 31, 1939. The road would have a concrete surface, poured directly onto the earth with no gravel roadbed. Concrete batch plants were set up along the road to aid paving. Interchange ramps were paved with asphalt. The paving led to a delay in the projected opening of the highway; by October 1939, the completion date was postponed from May 1 to June 29, 1940, because paving could not be done in winter. The commission rushed the paving, attempting to increase the distance paved from one to five miles (1.6 to 8.0 km) a day.

Completion was postponed until July 4, and again until late summer when rain delayed paving operations. On August 26, 1940, a preview of the highway was organized by commission chair Jones. It began the previous night with a banquet at The Hotel Hershey and proceeded west along the turnpike, stopping at the Clear Ridge cut before lunch at the Midway service plaza. The preview ended with dinner and entertainment at Pittsburgh's Duquesne Club. That month, a military motorcade traveled portions of the turnpike.

Paving concluded by the end of the summer, and on September 30 the turnpike commission announced that the road would open the following day. Because of the short notice, no ribbon-cutting ceremony was held.

The roadway took 770,000 short tons (700 kt) of sand, 1,200,000 short tons (1,100 kt) of stone, 50,000 short tons (45 kt) of steel, and more than 300,000 short tons (270 kt) of cement to complete. It was built at a cost of $370,000 per mile ($230,000/km) (equivalent to $6.65 million per mile ($2.5 million/km) in 2025). Eighteen thousand people worked on the turnpike, and 19 died during construction.

When the highway was under construction, its proposed toll was $1.50 (equivalent to $27.00 in 2025) for a one-way car trip; a round trip would cost $2.00 (equivalent to $36.00 in 2025). Trucks would pay $10.00 (equivalent to $181.00 in 2025) one way. Tolls would vary for motorists who did not travel the length of the turnpike. When it opened in 1940, automobile tolls were set at $1.50 (equivalent to $27.00 in 2025) one way and $2.25 (equivalent to $40.00 in 2025) round trip. The tolls were to be used to pay off bonds to build the road and were to be removed when the bonds were paid. However, tolls continue to be charged to finance improvements to the turnpike system. The toll rate was about $0.01 per mile ($0.0062/km) (equivalent to $0.18 per mile ($0.11/km) in 2025) when the turnpike opened. The ticket system was used to pay for tolls. This toll rate remained the same for the turnpike's first 29 years; other toll roads (such as the New York State Thruway and the Ohio, Connecticut, and Massachusetts turnpikes) had a higher rate.

Pennsylvania Turnpike postcard

The turnpike opened at midnight on October 1, 1940, between Irwin and Carlisle; the day before the opening, motorists lined up at the Irwin and Carlisle interchanges. Homer D. Romberger, a feed and tallow driver from Carlisle, was the first motorist to enter the turnpike at Carlisle; Carl A. Boe of McKeesport was the first motorist to enter at Irwin. Boe was flagged down by Frank Lorey and Dick Gangle, the turnpike's first hitchhikers. On October 6 (the first Sunday after the turnpike's opening), traffic was congested at toll plazas, tunnels, and service plazas.

During its first 15 days of operation, the road had over 150,000 vehicles. By the end of its first year it earned $3 million (equivalent to $53.9 million in 2025) in revenue from five million motorists, exceeding the $2.67 million (equivalent to $48 million in 2025) needed for operation and bond payments. With the onset of World War II, revenue declined due to tire and gas rationing; after the war, traffic increased.

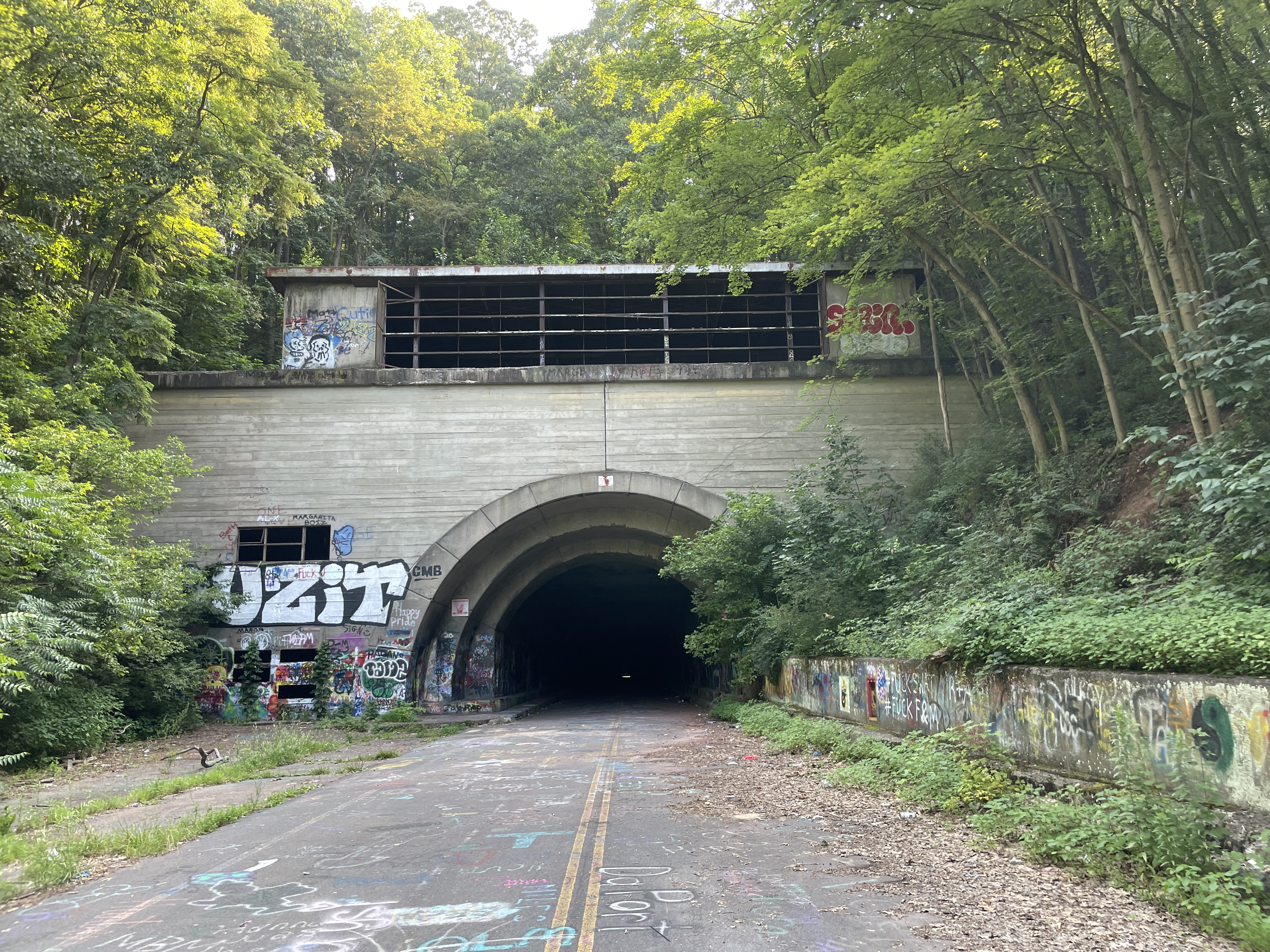
Western portal of the Rays Hill Tunnel in 2023

The turnpike was the first long-distance, limited-access road in the United States. A direct link between the mid-Atlantic and midwestern states, it reduced travel time between Pittsburgh and Harrisburg by hours; for example, Greyhound buses had taken nearly nine hours, but now took just 5 1/4, including a rest stop. Nicknamed "dream highway" and "the World's Greatest Highway" by the turnpike commission, it was also known as "the Granddaddy of the Pikes". Postcards and other souvenirs promoted the original stretch's seven tunnels through the Appalachians.

The highway was considered a yardstick against which limited-access highway construction would be measured. Commission chair Jones called for more limited-access roads to be built across the country for defense purposes, and the turnpike was a model for a proposed national network of highways planned during World War II. The turnpike led to the construction of other toll roads, such as the New Jersey Turnpike and (eventually) the Interstate Highway System, and has been designated a National Historic Civil Engineering Landmark by the American Society of Civil Engineers.

=== 1940s–1990s ===
70-mph speed limit on the turnpike

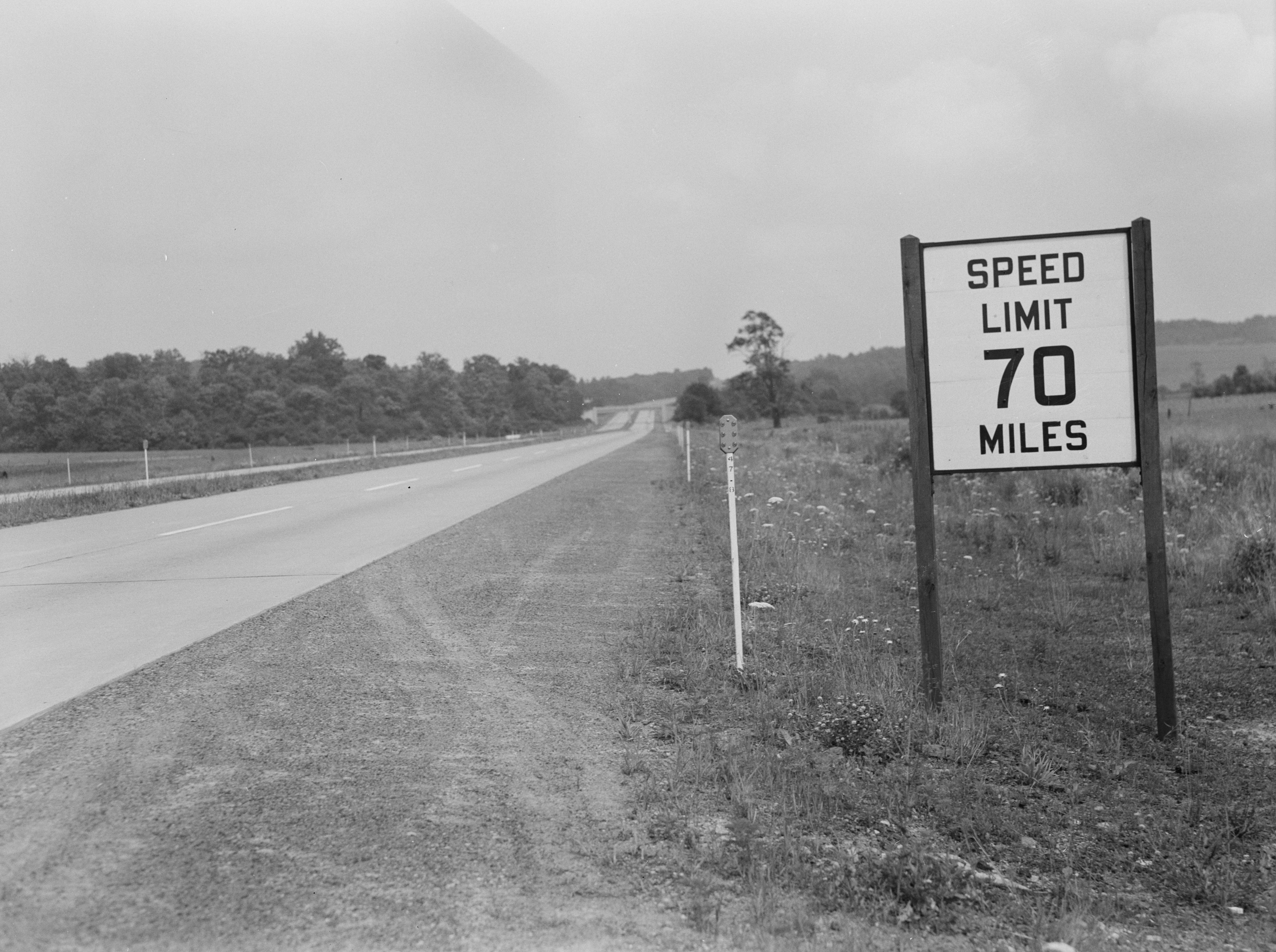
1942

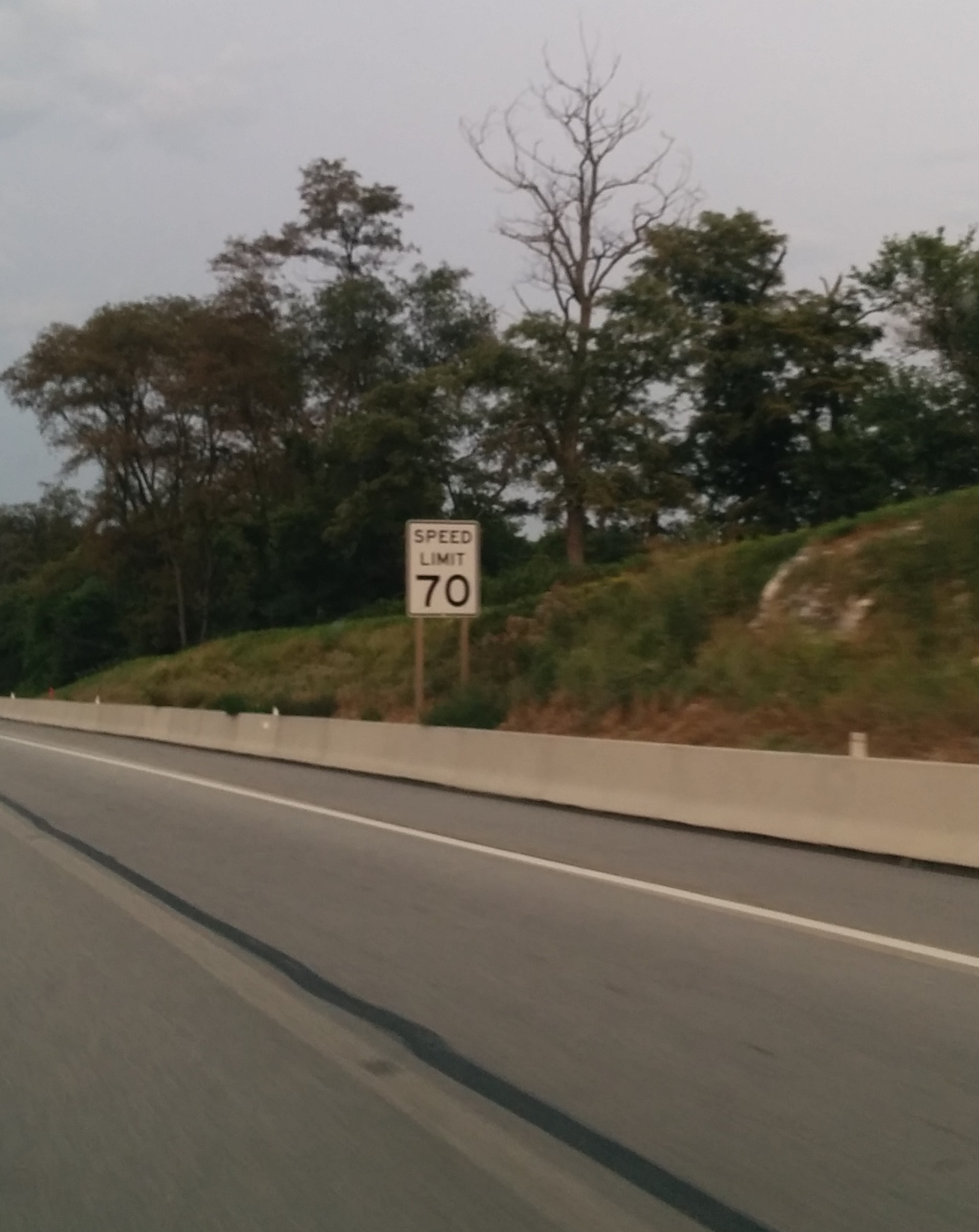
2014

The turnpike had no speed limit at all when it opened. The only exception was at the tunnels, where it reduced to 50 miles per hour (80 km/h). However, these were poorly enforced, some cars traveled as fast as 90 mph (140 km/h). In April 1941, speed limit was raised from 50 to 70 mph (80 to 113 km/h) for cars and 50 to 65 mph (80 to 105 km/h) for trucks.

Beginning in December 1941, the turnpike adopted the national speed limit of 35 mph (56 km/h) for all vehicles; in 1945, the limit returned to 70 mph (110 km/h).

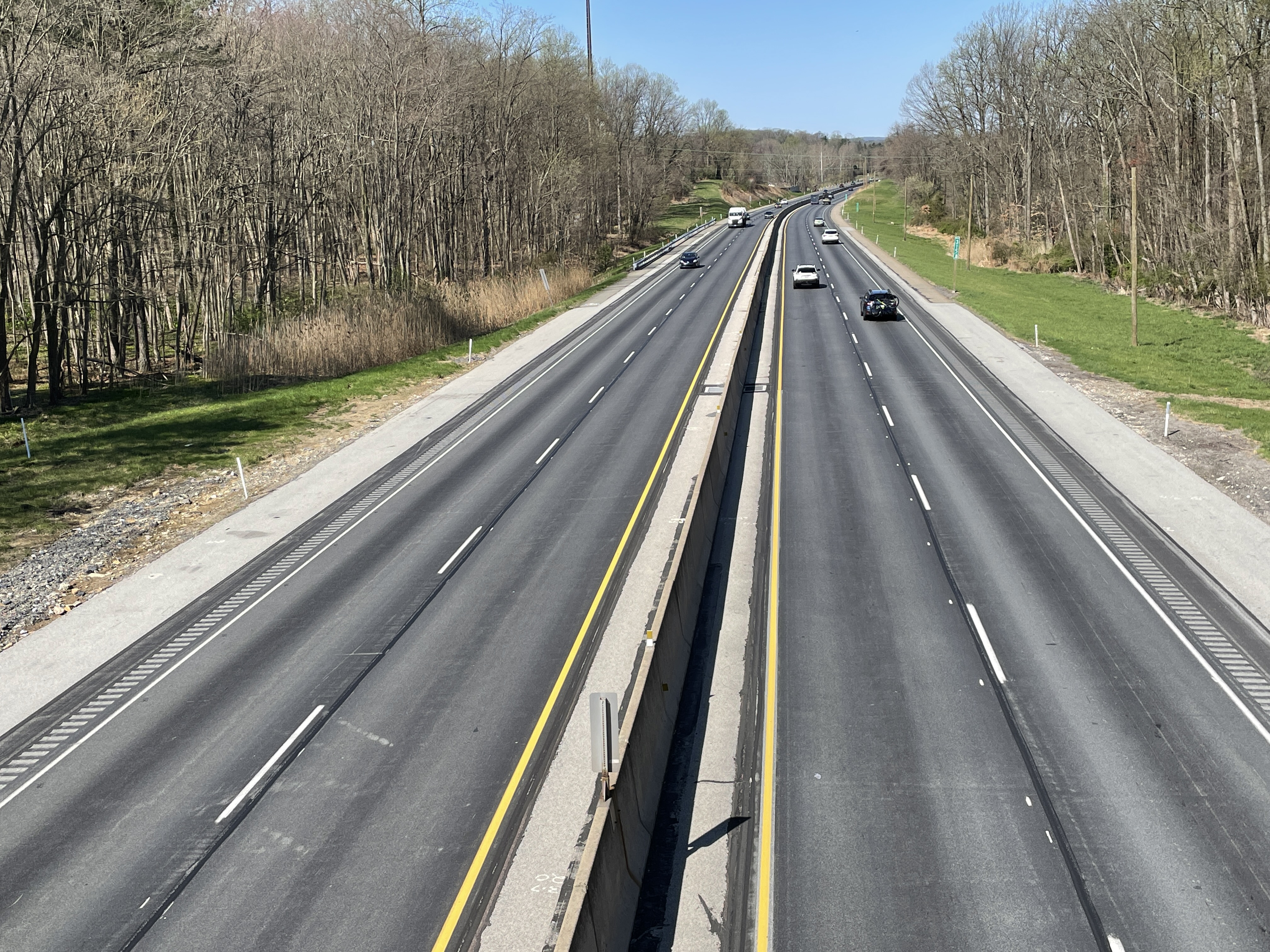
Westbound in Charlestown Township

Before the first section opened, the commission considered extending east to Philadelphia for defense purposes. The state legislature passed a 1939 bill allowing for an extension to Philadelphia, which was signed into law by Governor Arthur James as Act 11 in 1940. The extension was estimated to cost between $50 and $60 million in 1941 (equivalent to between $843 million and $1.01 billion in 2025). In June 1948, funding for the extension was put in place. The turnpike commission offered $134 million (equivalent to $1.43 billion in 2025) in bonds to pay for the extension that July, which had its estimations revised to $87 million. The Philadelphia extension would run from Carlisle east to US 202 in King of Prussia, connecting to the Schuylkill Expressway, a state-maintained freeway which would continue to Center City Philadelphia. Groundbreaking for the Philadelphia extension took place on September 28, 1948, in York County. Governor James H. Duff and commission chair Thomas J. Evans attended the ceremony.

In June 1941, Governor Arthur James signed Act 54 into law to build an extension to the Ohio border. The turnpike commission began looking into funding for this road in 1949, which would run from the Irwin Interchange to the Ohio state line near Youngstown and bypass Pittsburgh. That September, $77 million (equivalent to $824 million in 2025) in bonds were sold to finance construction of the western extension. Groundbreaking for the Western extension took place on October 24, 1949 at the Brush Creek viaduct in Irwin, with Governor Duff in attendance. These extensions would use air-entrained concrete poured on stone, an improvement that motorists did not see. Transverse joints on the pavement were spaced at 46-foot (14 m) intervals, 31-foot (9.4 m) less than the 77-foot (23 m) intervals on the original portion. Because it crossed less-mountainous terrain, the extension required less earthwork. Large bridges were built, including those crossing the Susquehanna River and Swatara Creek. This extension of the turnpike would use the same style of overpasses as the original section, excluding the steel deck bridge; an entirely new design. Like the Philadelphia extension, the western extension required the building of long bridges which included those crossing the Beaver and Allegheny Rivers. Overpasses were steel- and through-plate girder bridges. Concrete arch bridges were not used for overpasses, although they carried the turnpike over other roads. thirteen interchanges were built alongside the extensions, as well as the Gateway Toll Plaza and Valley Forge Toll Plaza, which served as the new eastern and western termini of the ticket system. The Carlisle Interchange was also closed, and the Middlesex Interchange with US 11 was realigned and renamed the Carlisle Interchange, The Irwin Interchange was also converted into the Irwin Toll Plaza. On February 1, 1950, this, alongside the portion of road to the Gettysburg Pike Interchange, was opened. The extension's completion was delayed by weather and a cement workers' strike; it was scheduled for October 1, 1950, the 10th anniversary of the opening of the first section. On October 23, the Philadelphia extension was previewed in a ceremony by Governor Duff. On November 13, the new Carlisle Interchange was opened as planned. However, drivers were barred from passing east of the new interchange. The rest of the Philadelphia extension opened to traffic on November 20; the governor and chair Evans cut the ribbon at the Valley Forge mainline toll plaza west of King of Prussia. Similarly to the Carlisle Interchange, the Irwin Toll Plaza was replaced by the Irwin Interchange, however, as the new alignment passed to the east of the Irwin Toll Plaza, the original toll plaza was retained. On August 7, 1951, the section between the Irwin Interchange and Pittsburgh Interchange opened; Ohio Governor Frank Lausche led a dedication ceremony on November 26 of that year. The extension opened to the Gateway toll plaza, near the Ohio state line, on December 26, 1951. The highway ended in a cornfield, and traffic followed a temporary ramp onto rural local roads until the connecting Ohio Turnpike was built. The Beaver Valley Interchange opened on March 1, 1952. The speed limit between the Ohio state line and Breezewood was lowered to 60 mph (97 km/h) in January 1953 to reduce the number of accidents, but returned to 70 mph (110 km/h) when the measure was ineffective. On December 1, 1954, the Ohio Turnpike opened and the Pennsylvania Turnpike was extended to the Ohio state line. With the completion of this project, an extra 167 miles (269 km) were added to the system, leaving a total length of 327 miles (526 km). Because of the new western terminus, mile markers and exit numbers on the original were updated to be accurate to the new western terminus.

On May 17, 1956, the speed limit was reduced from 70 to 65 mph (113 to 105 km/h) for cars, buses, and motorcycles; other vehicles were reduced from 70 to 50 mph (113 to 80 km/h).

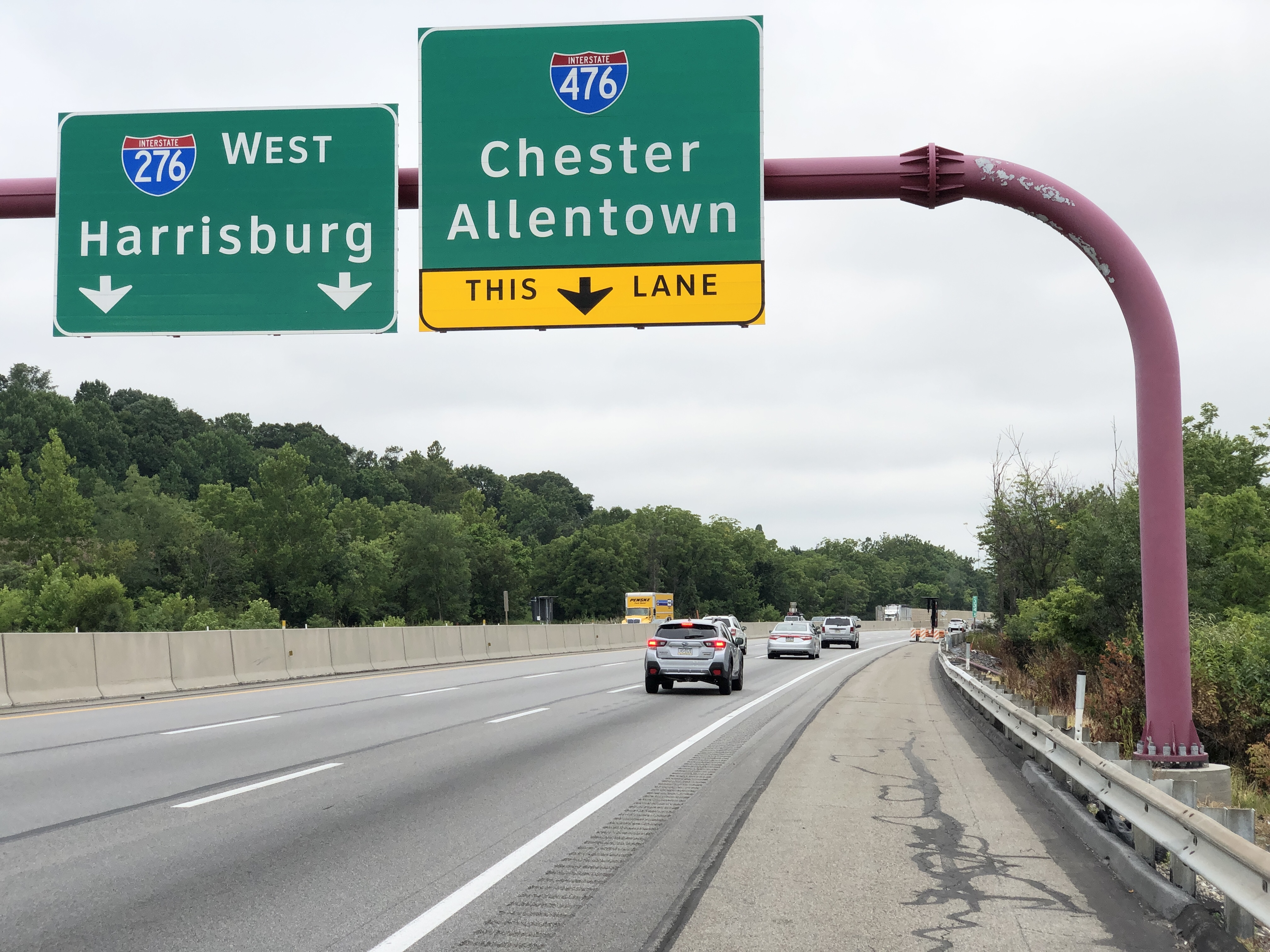
Westbound, approaching the Mid-County Interchange with I-476 in Plymouth Meeting

In 1951, plans to extend the turnpike east to New Jersey border at the Delaware River were announced. Construction of the Delaware River extension was approved by Governor John S. Fine in May of that year. A route bypassing Philadelphia was announced in 1952, crossing the Delaware on a bridge near Edgely and connecting to a branch of the New Jersey Turnpike. That September, the turnpike commission announced that $65 million, equivalent to $632 million in 2025, in bonds would be issued to finance the project. Work on the Delaware River extension began on November 20, 1952, and Governor Fine dug the first shovel into the earth at the groundbreaking ceremony. Five new interchanges, as well as the Delaware River Bridge Toll Plaza, were built, and the Valley Forge Toll Plaza was demolished and replaced by the Valley Forge Interchange. The Delaware River extension included a bridge over the Schuylkill River which was built to the same standards as the Susquehanna River Bridge. The construction of the Delaware River bridge required an amendment to the Pennsylvania Constitution, which barred the state from forming compacts with other states. In April 1954, $233 million (equivalent to $2.21 billion in 2025) in bonds were issued to finance the building of the Delaware River Bridge and the Northeast Extension. Groundbreaking for the Delaware River Bridge, connecting the Pennsylvania and New Jersey Turnpikes, took place on June 26, 1954, in Florence, New Jersey. On August 23, 1954, the Delaware River Extension opened between King of Prussia and US 611 in Willow Grove. the segment to the Fort Washington Interchange opened on September 20, to the Philadelphia Interchange on October 27, and the remainder of the road to the Delaware Valley Interchange opened on November 17, 1954. The short section between that interchange and the Delaware River Bridge opened to traffic on May 23, 1956. This was a joint construction project with the New Jersey Turnpike Authority. Pennsylvania Governor George M. Leader and New Jersey Governor Robert B. Meyner were present at the opening ceremony. The Delaware River Bridge Toll Plaza was built west of the bridge, marking the eastern end of the ticket system. With the completion of the extension, a motorist could drive from New York City to Indiana on limited-access toll roads. This bridge was originally six lanes wide, and had no median, but one was later installed and the bridge constricted to four lanes. With the extensions and connecting turnpikes, the highway was envisioned as part of a system of toll roads stretching from Maine to Chicago. It was now possible to drive from New York City to Chicago without encountering a traffic signal. This brought the mainline to its current length of 360 miles (580 km).

In late 1956, new machine-based toll equipment was activated for trucks, allowing for faster, more accurate tolls.

In 1953, an extension of the Pennsylvania Turnpike from the mainline near Plymouth Meeting north through Northeastern Pennsylvania to the New York state line near Binghamton, New York, was proposed. Groundbreaking for the Northeastern Extension occurred on March 25, 1954, in White Haven, with Governor John S. Fine and commission chair Thomas J. Evans present. The Northeast Extension was planned to run from the mainline Pennsylvania Turnpike in Plymouth Meeting north to a temporary terminus at Scranton. In April 1954, $233 million (equivalent to $2.21 billion in 2025) in bonds were issued to build the Northeastern Extension along with the Delaware River–Turnpike Toll Bridge on the mainline Pennsylvania Turnpike. The Northeast Extension was built with a four-foot (1.2 m) median in order to save money. Due to the mountainous terrain it passed through, a large amount of earthwork was necessary to build the road along with the construction of large bridges. Among the bridges built was the 1,630-foot-long (500 m) Clarks Summit Bridge (since renamed for John J. Fitzgerald, Turnpike engineer and superintendent) over US 6/US 11, which at the time was the tallest bridge on the Pennsylvania Turnpike system at 135 feet (41 m). The Northeast Extension also included the two-lane Lehigh Tunnel under Blue Mountain. The tunnel was originally going to be named for commission chair Evans but was changed when he was convicted of conspiracy to defraud the commission of $19 million (equivalent to $140 million in 2025). The road was opened between the Plymouth Meeting Interchange and the Lehigh Valley Interchange on November 23, 1955. The highway was extended north to a temporary interchange at Emerald on December 28 of that year. The Northeast Extension was opened between Emerald and Wyoming Valley on April 1, 1957. The entire length of the Northeast Extension was finished on November 7, 1957, with the completion of the northernmost part between Wyoming Valley and Scranton. The part of the Northeast Extension between Scranton and the New York state line was not built as part of the Pennsylvania Turnpike system but rather the Interstate Highway System as I-81. At the northern terminus, the Northeast Extension narrowed to two lanes along the northbound offramp at Scranton to come to its northern terminus just outside Clarks Summit, with an abandoned short spur of the mainline heading north. A pair of trumpet interchanges were built to connect the Northeast Extension and I-81.

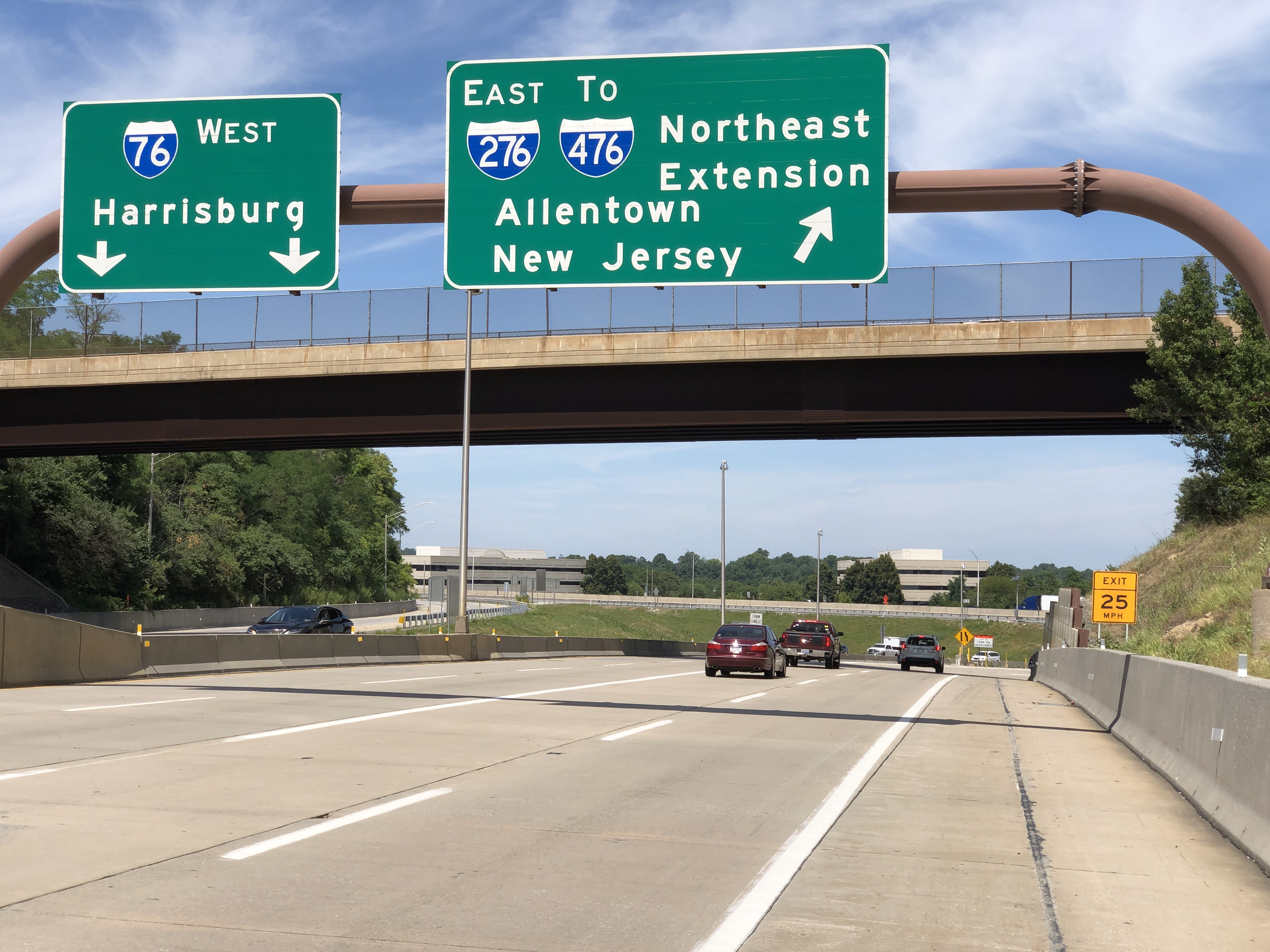
Signs at the turnpike entrance at Valley Forge showing I-76 and I-276 designations for the mainline and I-476 designation for the Northeast Extension

In August 1957, the Bureau of Public Roads added the mainline to the Interstate Highway System in accordance with recommendations by state highway departments to include toll roads in the system. I-80 was planned to run along the turnpike from the Ohio state line and Harrisburg West Interchange, where I-80S would continue east to the Valley Forge Interchange. I-70 was also planned to follow the turnpike between the Pittsburgh Interchange and Breezewood Interchange. At a June 26, 1958 meeting of the Route Numbering Subcommittee on the US Numbered System, it was decided to move the I-80 designation to an alignment further north; the highway from the Ohio state line to the Valley Forge Interchange would become I-80S. Between the Valley Forge Interchange and the New Jersey state line, the turnpike was designated I-280. With the creation of the Interstate Highway System, restaurants and gas stations were prohibited along interstate highways; the turnpike was grandfathered when it joined the system, allowing it to continue operating its service plazas. Signage was updated to be of a MUTCD standard with this change.

In July 1959, a minimum speed of 35 mph (56 km/h) was established.

By the early 1950s, it was apparent that the original concrete driving surface between the Irwin Interchange and Carlisle Interchange was in poor shape. This was caused by excessive transverse-joint spacing and no gravel between earth and concrete. Because of this, a project began in 1954 to layer the original turnpike segment between Irwin and Carlisle with a 3-inch (7.6 cm) layer of asphalt. Drainage was also implemented in order to prevent black ice from forming during cold weather, which was previously a common problem. During the work, traffic was restricted to two lanes on one roadway while the other was worked on. The first stretch to be rehabilitated was the 21-mile (34 km) stretch between the Irwin Interchange and Sideling Hill Tunnel. Repaving the rest of the roadway was completed by September 8, 1962.

Interstate 280
- Location: King of Prussia–Bristol Township
- Length: 32.65 mi (52.55 km)
- Existed: 1958–February 1964

In April 1963, the state of Pennsylvania proposed renumbering the interstates. As part of this, I-80S would be redesignated as I-76 between the Pittsburgh Interchange and Valley Forge Interchange, and I-280 would be redesignated as I-276 for its entire length, as neither connected to I-80 which violated interstate highway standards. The changes were approved by the Federal Highway Administration (FHWA) on February 26, 1964. With this, the turnpike would carry I-76 from the Pittsburgh Interchange to Valley Forge Interchange and I-276 from the Valley Forge Interchange to the New Jersey state line. Signage was updated with this change.

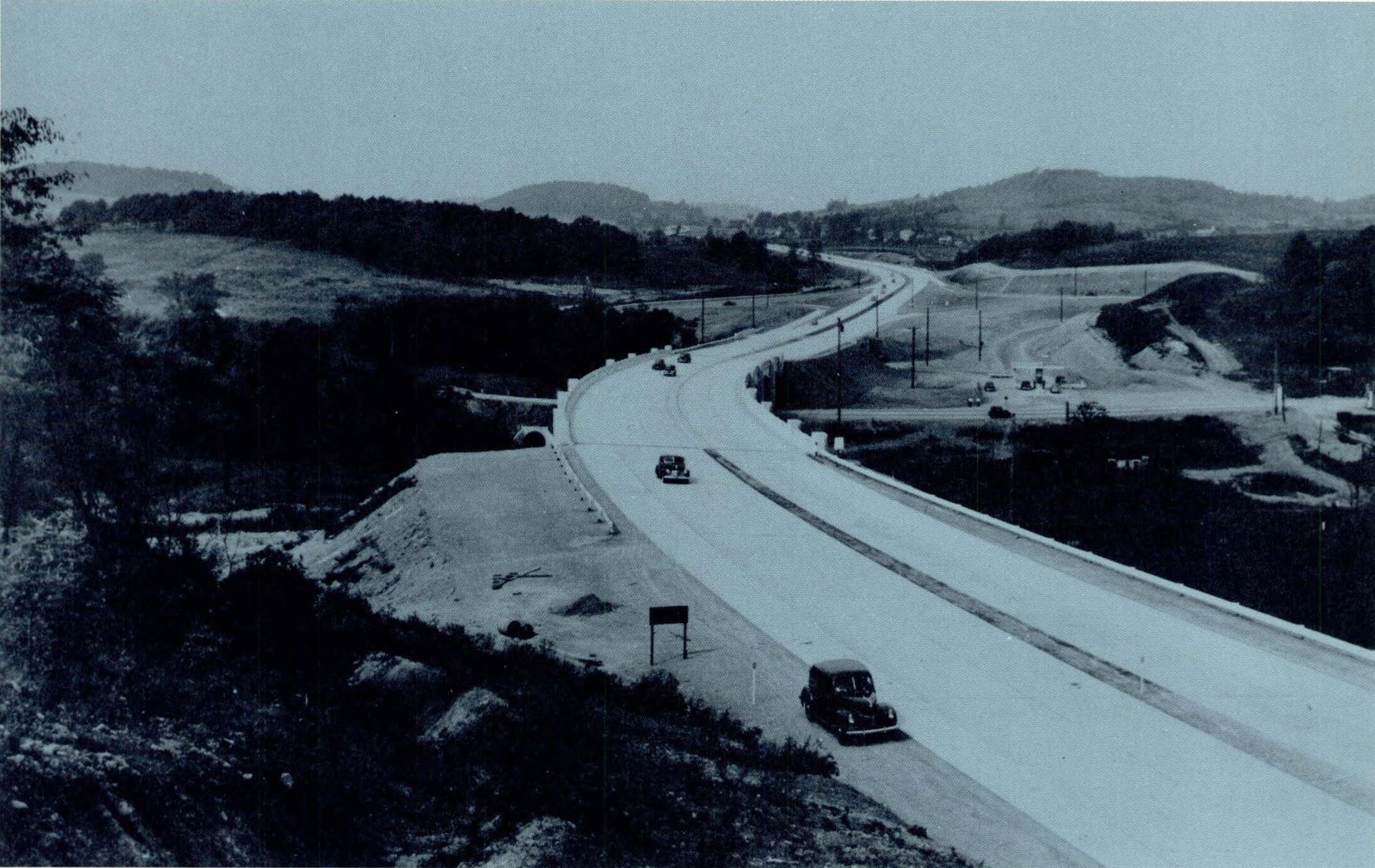
The original New Stanton Interchange

The original New Stanton Interchange was the only non-trumpet interchange design remaining on the turnpike. It instead consisted of a pair of grade separated right-in/right-out ramps that merged into left hand, at-grade ramps into the two lane toll plaza, which then traveled to an intersection with left hand conflicting turns onto US 119. However, upon PennDOT completing the freeway realignment of Pennsylvania Route 71 (PA 71) in 1959, which brought traffic from Washington to New Stanton, use of the interchange increased significantly. Additionally, with I-70 planning to replace both PA 71 and US 119, the PTC became aware the interchange would need to be replaced. The interchange was initially left as is due to financial restraints, though when a man was killed in a car crash in 1963, funding was obtained, and work began that October to replace it. The new interchange was to be a safer double trumpet. The project, which had cost $1.6 million (equivalent to $12.7 million in 2025) was completed on November 12. The completion of this construction marked the first interchange to be replaced, as well as the first interchange that didn't connect to an interstate highway or other expressway to be replaced in order to do so. The original eastbound exit and entrance were never demolished and still exist.

On November 19, 1964, plans were proposed to the PTC that would have built an interchange with PA 501 near Myerstown. This never occurred.

In September 1965, the minimum speed limit was reduced to 40 mph (64 km/h).

The median, initially thought to be wide enough, was functionally obsolete by 1960. Because of this, nearly 100 miles (160 km) of median barrier began to be built across most of the road. Work was completed in December 1965 at a cost of $5 million (equivalent to $38.9 million in 2025).

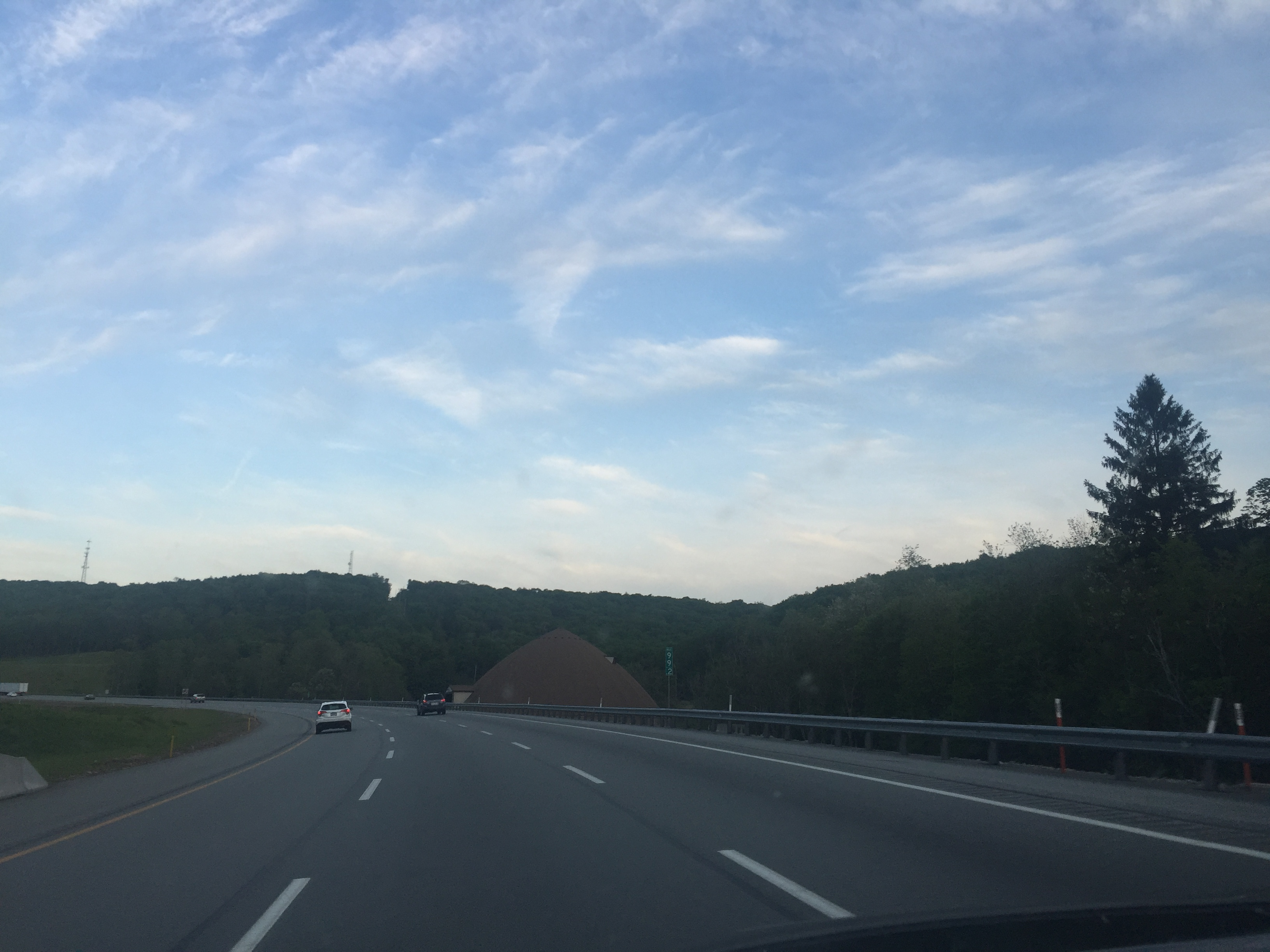
The Laurel Hill Bypass in 2017

As traffic levels increased at a rate almost ten times what PTC engineers originally anticipated, the two-lane tunnels became bottlenecks on the otherwise four lane road. As early as 1951, eastbound traffic had begun slowing down at the Laurel Hill Tunnel. In addition, with the New York State Thruway and Interstate 80 under construction, the turnpike faced its first serious competition. If nothing was done, traffic would migrate to those roads quickly. The PTC then began considering the potential widening of the tunnels as early as the mid 1950s. By 1958, traffic congestion at both the Laurel Hill Tunnel and Allegheny Mountain Tunnel was a regular occurrence, especially during the summer months. In late 1959, four senators urged state officials to work with the turnpike commission to study how to reduce the traffic jams, this was after the worst traffic back up in the history of the highway to date occurred at the Laurel Hill Tunnel. That year, the commission began studying ways to resolve the traffic jams at the two westernmost tunnels, the Laurel Hill Tunnel and Allegheny Mountain Tunnel. After study, the turnpike commission planned to eliminate the two bottlenecks by either adding a second tubes at each or replacing them. In June 1960, the PTC announced these plans would build a widening of the Allegheny Mountain Tunnel and a replacement around the Laurel Hill Tunnel. The Laurel Hill Bypass was planned because construction would be quicker (and congestion reduction given at a cheaper cost) than would be by boring another tunnel. In June 1962, the commission approved the projects. That August, $21 million, equivalent to $171 million in 2025, in bonds were sold to finance the projects. Groundbreaking for both the Laurel Hill Bypass and twin Allegheny Mountain Tunnel occurred on September 6, 1962. The Laurel Hill bypass was constructed as a deep cut to the north; the new section would have a wide median and eastbound truck-climbing lane. would require explosives to create a 145-foot-deep (44 m) cut into the mountain. The new twin Allegheny Mountain Tunnel would have white tiles, fluorescent lighting, and improved ventilation. The former South Pennsylvania Railroad Allegheny Mountain tunnel was considered for use as a twin of the road bore, but as in the 1930s, was rejected because of its poor condition. The Laurel Hill bypass opened to traffic on October 30, 1964, at a cost of $7.5 million, equivalent to $59.4 million in 2025, closing the old alignment permanently. On March 15, 1965, the new Allegheny Mountain Tunnel opened to traffic and the original tube was closed for renovations. It reopened on August 25, 1966. The construction of the second tube at Allegheny Mountain cost $12 million (equivalent to $90.8 million in 2025). With the completion of this project, the entirety of the 165 miles (266 km) between the Ohio state line and Rays Hill Tunnel was four or more lanes wide. With the construction complete, the Allegheny Mountain Tunnel became the tunnel closest to the Ohio state line. In addition, the highest point on the turnpike became the 2,603 feet (793 m) Laurel Hill Bypass, beating the former record held by the tunnel itself. After its closure, the old Laurel Hill alignment and tunnel began being used as a storage facility for road salt. Since 2004, the tunnel itself has been used by Chip Ganassi Racing for high-speed race car aerodynamic testing. The tunnel was repaved, equipped with climate control, safety equipment, and data collection systems. The first car he Tested was G-Force Technologies Indycar. This alignment at Laurel Hill is private property. It is routinely patrolled by the Pennsylvania State Police for trespassers.

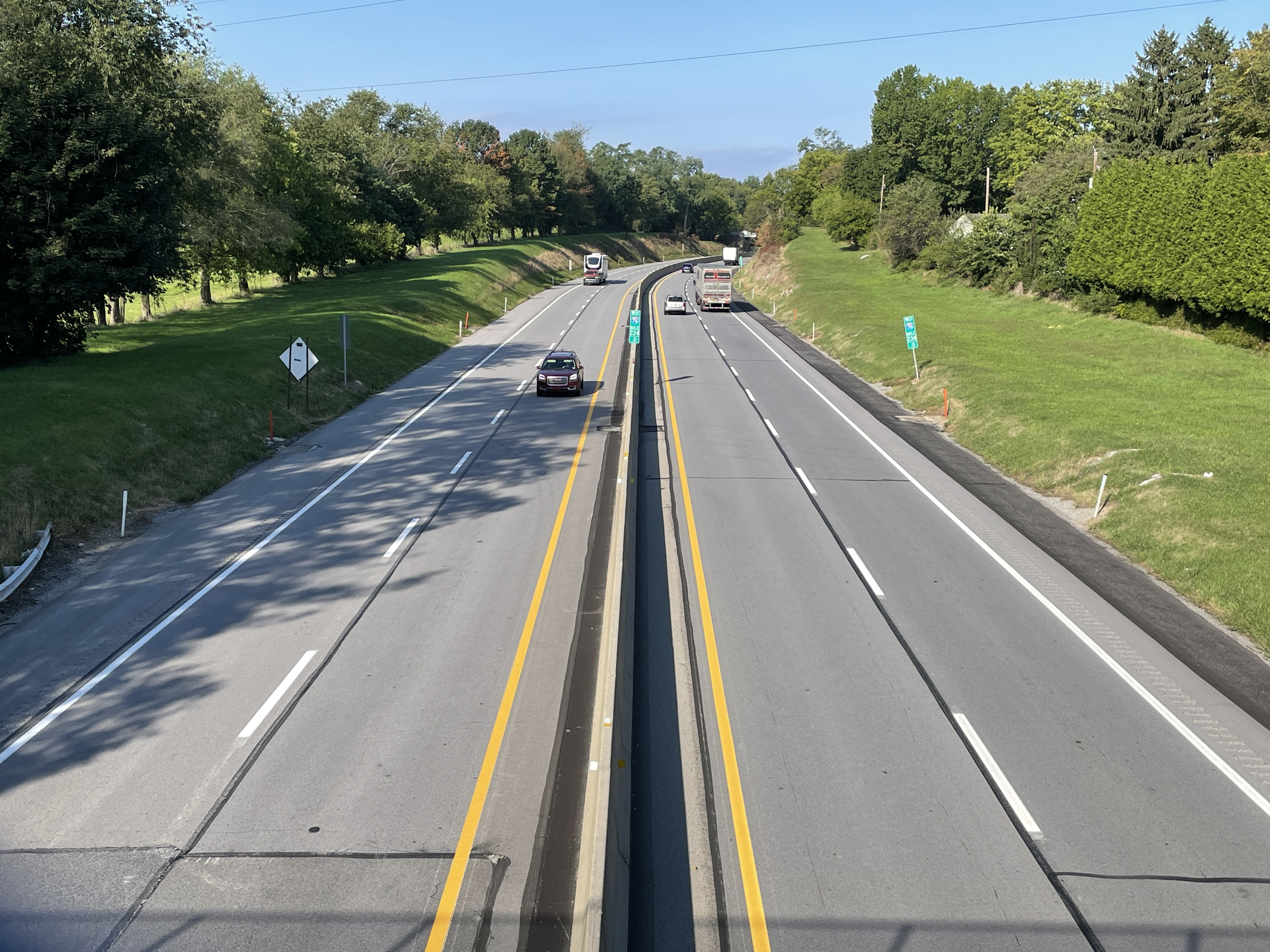
Westbound in Upper Allen Township

By the end of 1969, $3.2 million (equivalent to $21.5 million in 2025) worth of improvements to interchanges were completed. At the Gateway Toll Plaza, three lanes were added, bringing the total up to eleven. At Pittsburgh Interchange, its ramps were rebuilt to serve an eastern extension of I-76 with a ten lane toll plaza. At the Harrisburg East Interchange, the old toll plaza and ramps onto Eisenhower Boulevard were replaced by a new toll plaza and ramps to serve I-283.

In order to increase safety, the PTC began installing steel barriers at curves and other areas they deemed to have a high amount of accidents in 1957. By 1970, this had been completed.

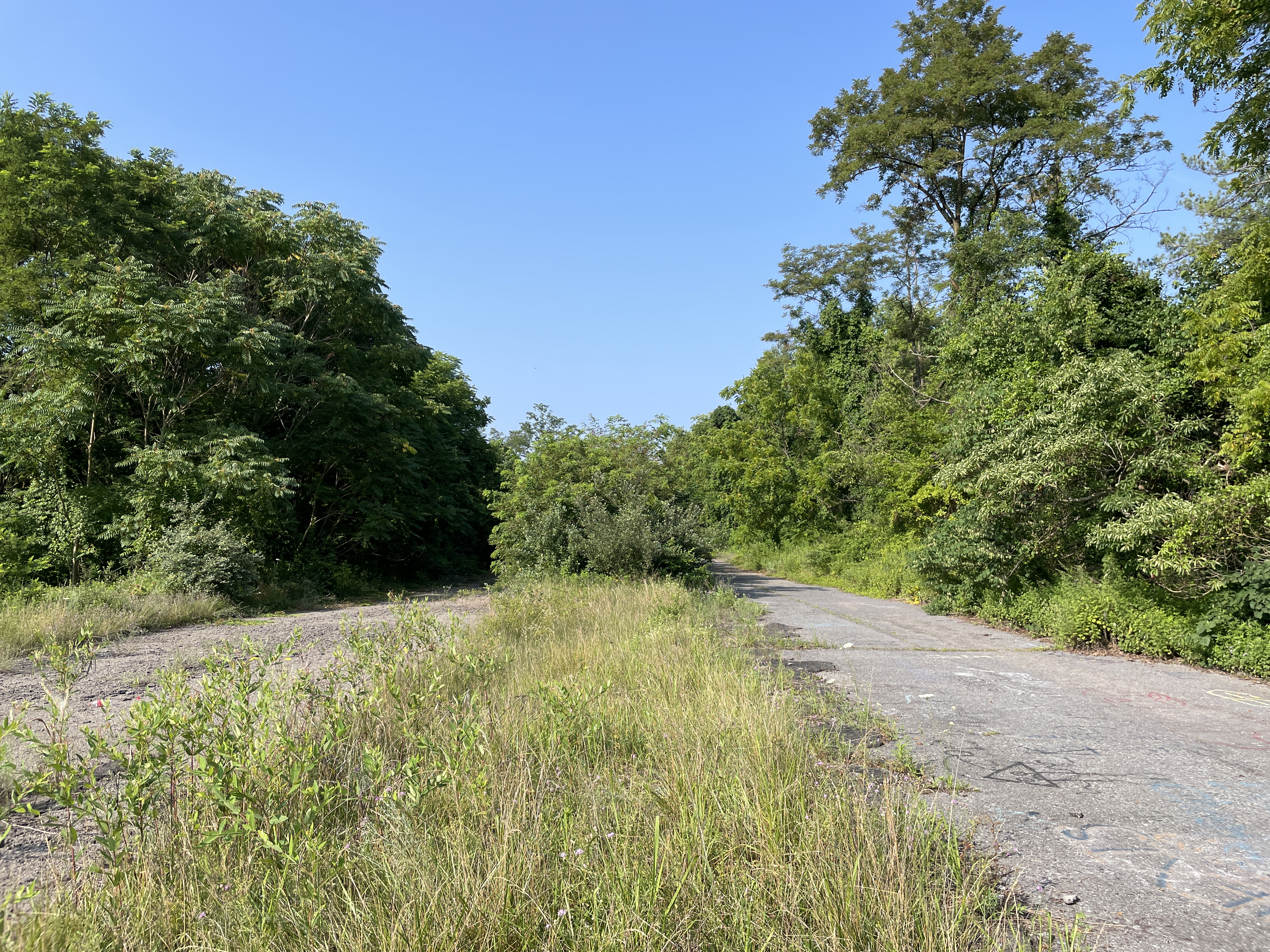
The abandoned Pennsylvania Turnpike between Rays Hill Tunnel and Breezewood in 2023

Studies on how to improve the other tunnels on the mainline were undertaken during the 1960s. After study, the turnpike commission planned to make the entire turnpike east of the Breezewood Interchange at least four lanes by adding a second tube at the tunnels or replacing them with cuts, and in 1965, the turnpike commission announced plans to rebuild the Tuscarora, Kittatinny, and Blue Mountain tunnels into twin facilities, as well as building a 13.5-mile (21.7 km) replacement around both the Sideling Hill and Rays Hill tunnels. A bypass of the tunnels was considered during the 1930s, but was determined to be too expensive.

A 1961 study concluded that a bypass would be the best option to handle traffic at Rays Hill and Sideling Hill. The replacement of the two tunnels would have a 36-foot-wide (11 m) median, an eastbound truck climbing lane, and wider shoulders. The commission sold $77.5 million (equivalent to $587 million in 2025) bonds in January 1966 to finance the project. They also deemed that the bypass of Sideling Hill and Rays Hill would involve construction of a new Breezewood Interchange. This would use part of the original mainline turnpike. The trumpet and toll plaza would be located southwest of Breezewood, as opposed to in it like the original. Contrary to early plans, the new interchange did not directly connect to the road, due to a study completed in 1966 determining such a move would not increase toll revenue. However, recognizing the use of the interchange by Interstate 70 traffic, the new exits toll plaza would be ten lanes wide. Construction of the replacement of the Rays Hill and Sideling Hill tunnels began in 1967. It involved blasting a cut across both hills. In building the cut across Rays Hill, part of US 30 had to be realigned. The new road passes over the Sideling Hill Tunnel. This bypass of the two tunnels would have a 36-foot-wide (11 m) median with a steel barrier in the middle. It would also have wide shoulders and an eastbound truck climbing lane. The new alignment ends a short distance east of the Cove Valley plaza on the original segment, as well as a short distance west of the original Breezewood Interchange. Because of this, the Sideling Hill plaza was built to replace it, being located on the new stretch. This is the only single building plaza serving travelers in both directions. The turnpike bypass of the Rays Hill and Sideling Hill tunnels opened on November 26, 1968.

Studies concluded that a parallel tunnel was the most economical option at the Tuscarora, Kittatinny, and Blue Mountain tunnels. Work on the new tube at the Tuscarora Mountain Tunnel began on April 11, 1966, and construction began at the Kittatinny and Blue Mountain tunnels a week later. The parallel tubes at the three tunnels opened on November 26, 1968, and the original tubes were closed or began to be remodeled. The new and remodeled tunnels had fluorescent lighting, white tile walls, and 13-foot-wide (4.0 m) lanes. The portals of the new tunnels were designed to resemble the original tunnels. In October 1970, a replacement Breezewood Interchange opened. That month, reconstruction of the original Tuscarora Mountain Tunnel was completed; work on refurbishing the original Kittatinny and Blue Mountain tunnels was finished on March 18, 1971.

With the completion of this project, the entire mainline was at least four lanes wide, and as such met minimal interstate highway standards. With the closure of the original Breezewood portion, the longest tunnel became the Allegheny Mountain Tunnel, while the shortest became the Blue Mountain Tunnel. A 0.10 miles (0.16 km) was also added to the system because of the Sideling/Rays Hill Bypasses' increased curvature.

After traffic was diverted to the new alignment, the former stretch passing through the Rays Hill and Sideling Hill tunnels became known as the abandoned Pennsylvania Turnpike. The turnpike commission continued to maintain the tunnels for a few years before abandoning them. The abandoned stretch deteriorated; signs and guardrails were removed, pavement began crumbling, trees grew in the median, and vandals and nature began taking over the tunnels. The turnpike commission still performed some maintenance on the abandoned stretch and used it to test pavement-marking equipment. In 2001, the turnpike commission turned over a significant portion of the abandoned section to the Southern Alleghenies Conservancy; bicycles and hikers could use the former roadway. In 2018 the Bedford-Fulton Joint Recreation Authority, a non-profit arm of the Fulton County Chamber of Commerce and Tourism, acquired ownership. The abandoned stretch of the turnpike is the longest stretch of abandoned freeway in the United States.

In 1968, a PTC contractor proposed a project that would have rebuilt the eastern portion of the road between the Morgantown Interchange and the Delaware River Bridge in order to reduce congestion and limit stops at toll plazas as much as possible. However, due to being too expensive, the PTC quickly scaled this down to relocation of the eastern terminus of the ticket system from the Delaware River Bridge Toll Plaza to the Morgantown Interchange. With this, the portion in between was to be converted into a barrier toll system, with tolls removed from interchanges, with them instead being collected at plazas along the turnpike. A 1971 study recommended not carrying out this proposal due to a decline in toll revenue.

Interstate 80S
- Location: North Beaver Township–King of Prussia
- Existed: 1958–October 1972

Ohio planned to eliminate I-80S in 1971, replacing it with a realigned I-76. Because of this, it would also have to be removed from the turnpike west of the Pittsburgh Interchange. Pennsylvania disagreed with the change, recommending that I-80S become I-376. Pennsylvania changed its mind, supporting Ohio's plan to renumber I-80S as I-76. In December of that year, the change was approved by the American Association of State Highway Officials. The change took effect on October 2, 1972. With this, I-76 was carried on the turnpike between the Ohio state line and Valley Forge Interchange. Signage was updated with this change.

In August 1973, the portion between the New Stanton Interchange and Breezewood Interchange was named the Dwight D. Eisenhower Memorial Highway.

In 1969, the turnpike commission announced plans to widen the road. It proposed doubling the number of lanes from four to eight, excluding the Philadelphia and Irwin to New Stanton portions, which would instead have been ten lanes. Cars and trucks would use separate roadways. The commission had also proposed a new interchange with I-79 in Carpentertown. The road would have had an 80-mile-per-hour (130 km/h) speed limit and holographic road signs. The widening would have kept much of the routing intact, but significant reconstruction was proposed between the Allegheny Mountain and Blue Mountain tunnels. Because of the $1.1-billion (equivalent to $6.08 billion in 2025) cost and the 1973 oil crisis negative effect on toll revenue, the plan was not implemented.

In 1974, the Northeast Extension was designated PA 9.

Starting in the early 1970s, PennDOT began bypassing the at-grade portion of US 222 in Lancaster County with a new freeway located west of the original. Because of this, when the portion the Reading Interchange served was bypassed, it would need to be replaced in order to connect to the new freeway. Construction began in 1972, alongside the new road. The project involved constructing a 1.5 miles (2.4 km) long access road with a diamond interchange leading to the new freeway, past there, it traveled to Pennsylvania Route 272, the former surface alignment. The new toll plaza featured five toll lanes, and was the first interchange on the turnpike to use high mast ramp lighting, as well as truck weighing computers, which were much faster than the old machines. The project was completed on April 10, 1974. The truck computers were later installed across the entire road. With this, the project cost $6.6 million, equivalent to $33.5 million in 2025. The old ramps overpass was not demolished.

With passage of the National Maximum Speed Law in August 1974, the speed limit on the turnpike was reduced to 55 mph (89 km/h).

With the opening of I-79 in Cranberry by 1975, the Perry Highway Interchange was expanded to serve increased traffic levels.

By 1975, the road, most of which was still using a concrete driving surface, had deteriorated significantly. Because of this, the PTC surfaced these portions with an asphalt overlay. This was completed by 1980.

In the 1970s, the PTC proposed major improvements to the 160 miles (260 km) portion between the Irwin Interchange and Carlisle Interchange. The Irwin Interchange, New Stanton Interchange, Donegal Interchange, Somerset Interchange, and Carlisle Interchange would all be expanded and renovated. A new westbound truck-climbing lane would be built east of the Allegheny Mountain Tunnel, as well as in New Baltimore; in addition, the existing eastbound truck lane at Laurel Hill was extended west. Construction began in 1978, when the effects of the 1973 oil crisis finally ended. To allow for the new truck lane, which would serve westbound traffic, a new eastbound roadway was built, this was to allow the new eastbound truck lane to use what was originally the four-lane eastbound and westbound road. Overpasses along the effected stretches of road were replaced. The longest of the new truck lanes was the new Allegheny Mountain lane, which was 2.2 miles (3.5 km) long. The last of the construction was completed on December 2, 1981, at the cost of $70 million, equivalent to $210 million in 2025.

In 1982, the Fort Littleton Interchange was given rebuilt ramps and an expanded toll plaza.

On September 10, 1983, the Blue Mountain Interchange's original two lane toll plaza was replaced with a new four lane toll plaza. The original booth was donated to the Smithsonian Institution.

A study of potentially eliminating toll takers began in 1982, with the introduction of the Automatic Ticket Issuing Machine (ATIM). Also as part of this, new 2.50-inch (6.4 cm) tickets would be introduced, replacing the 3.70-inch (9.4 cm) ones, which, unlike them, would feature a magnetic strip that contained the toll fare and other information. Terminals were also added to the truck computers. Following this study determining that it would reduce congestion, the ticket machines replaced human workers on July 22, 1987.

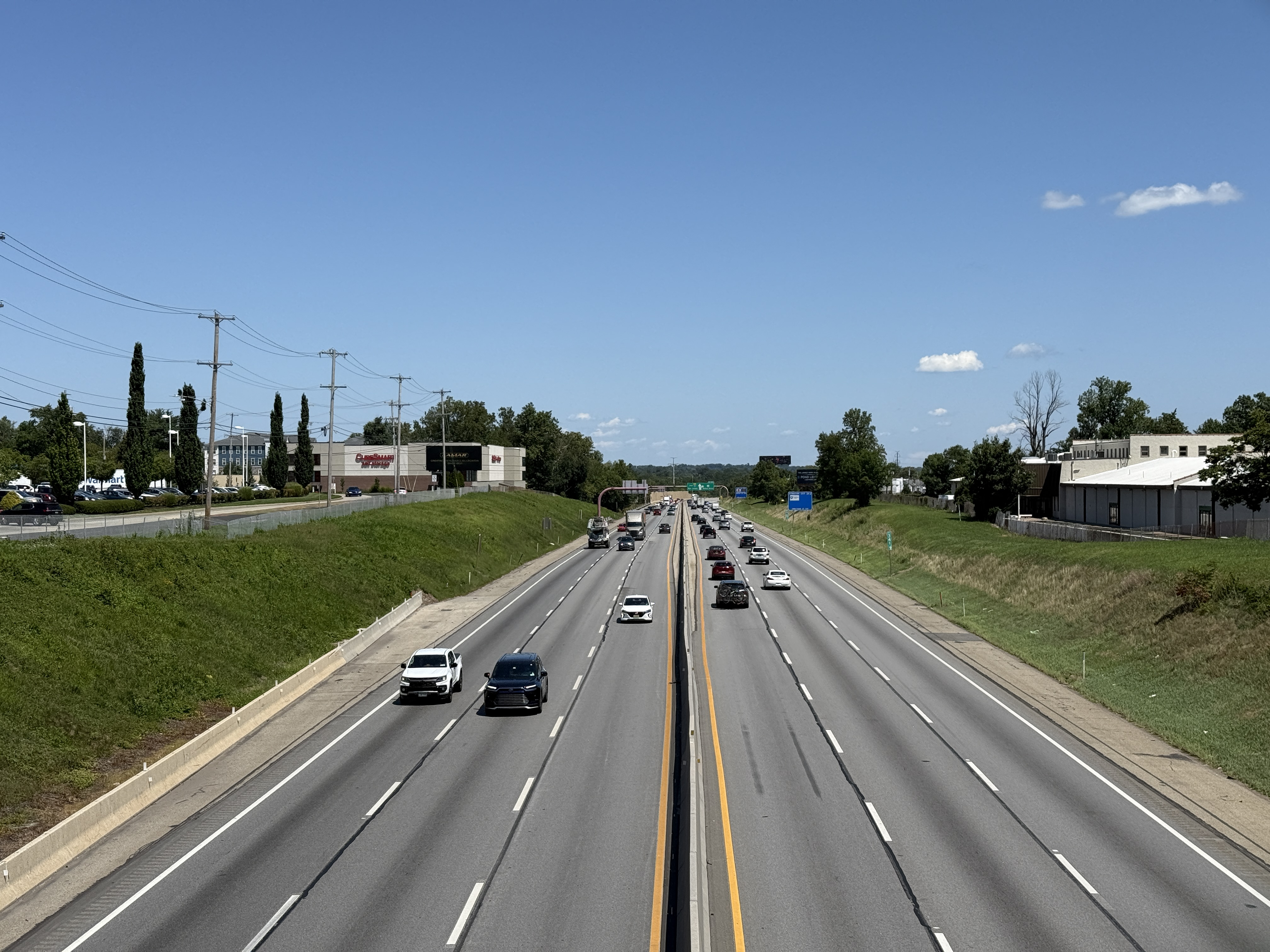
Eastbound approaching the Willow Grove Interchange with PA 611

By the early 1980s, the section of road in the Philadelphia area had become a bottleneck. Because of this, in June 1983, funding was obtained to widen the turnpike to six lanes between the Valley Forge Interchange and Philadelphia Interchange. The project was put on hold because of disagreements between Governor Dick Thornburgh and members of the turnpike commission. The Pennsylvania legislature approved the project in 1985, with the agreement, the eastern terminus of the six lane alignment would be scaled down to the Norristown Interchange. Construction began on March 10, 1986. In spite of the widened road, no overpasses in the area affected were replaced. Improvements to the Fort Washington Interchange, Willow Grove Interchange, and Philadelphia Interchange completed in late 1986. The rest of the widening was completed on November 23, 1987, with a ribbon-cutting at the Philadelphia Interchange. The project cost $120 million (equivalent to $663 million in 2025).

In 1988, tandem toll booths were added to the Valley Forge Interchange; they were added at the Willow Grove Interchange in 1989.

In July 1989, politician Michael Dawida announced his intentions to pass a bill allowing PennDOT to replace the Breezewood Interchange to provide direct access to Interstate 70, as well as to rebuild the Carlisle Interchange to provide direct access to Interstate 81. He wanted this because both US 30 at the Breezewood Interchange and US 11 at the Carlisle Interchange suffer from chronic congestion due to heavy through traffic traveling to these interstates. He had experienced a crash at the latter a year before. However, the Breezewood proposal was criticized by Breezewood politicians, they instead criticized congestion at the Squirrel Hill Tunnel. He later dropped these proposals.

On October 31, 1989, the one-billionth vehicle traveled on the turnpike, entering through the Irwin Interchange.

=== 1990s–2000s ===
The turnpike commission celebrated the original road's 50th anniversary in October 1990. Over $300,000 (equivalent to $652,000 in 2025) was spent to promote the turnpike with a videotape, souvenirs, and a private party attended by politicians and companies that work with the turnpike. The portion between the Irwin Interchange and Carlisle Interchange was also designated as a National Historic Civil Engineering Landmark, in recognition of importance as one of the first US freeways.

In early 1991, a project to expand the Downingtown Interchange was completed.

Call boxes were installed between the New Stanton Interchange and Allegheny Mountain Tunnel in December 1988, with it extending all the way to the Kittatinny Mountain Tunnel by the next year. On July 4, 1990, the PTC introduced the *11 emergency cellular phone number, allowing mobile phones the same functionality. On November 22, 1991, they were equipped along the entire length of the highway. This made it so that the one was located every one-mile (1.6 km).

In 1989, construction began on an eastbound truck lane between the Beaver River Bridge and emergency pull off at milepost 15.5. Overpasses needed to be rebuilt to accommodate the work. Unlike the previous truck lanes, no major realignment occurred. Construction on the project was completed in early 1992.

Plans for an interchange to serve the New Cumberland Defense Depot near Harrisburg was announced in 1985. In September 1992, the turnpike commission scrapped the project.

With plans for the Beaver Valley Expressway made, also came plans for the New Castle Interchange to serve the road. Construction began in November 1990, and on November 20, 1992, this exit opened to traffic.

In the 1980s, plans were made to build the Mid-County Interchange, it would serve the north end of the Mid-County Expressway. As part of this, the ramps onto the Northeast Extension were to be rebuilt, and the Norristown Interchange would also be improved with new ramps onto the new highway. The PTC issued an initial contract in March 1989. Construction was delayed when an unsuccessful bidder challenged the commission that June, saying that it violated female and minority contracting rules about the percentage of employees that were used for the project. The PTC approved an initial contract to build it in March 1989. The contract was rebid in November 1989 after a Supreme Court of Pennsylvania ruling. As part of this project, a new 19 lane toll plaza was built. The Mid-County Interchange was opened to traffic in November 1992, which allowed for closure and demolition of the original ramps onto the northeast Extension and completion of their replacements. A ribbon-cutting took place on December 15, 1992, with the replacement ramps onto the Northeast Extension opening the next day. This was the first interchange on the turnpike with flyover ramps.

An interchange was proposed with PA 743 between Elizabethtown and Hershey in 1990. However, an April 1993 study determined that it would not improve traffic flow on local roads.

On July 13, 1995, the speed limit was raised to 60 mph (97 km/h), except for mainline toll plazas, interchange ramps and toll plazas, the tunnels, and the portion between the Philadelphia Interchange and the New Jersey state line, which did not get the raised limit.

In late 1995, construction was completed on a project to widen the bridge traveling over the Brush Creek Railroad in Irwin with shoulders.

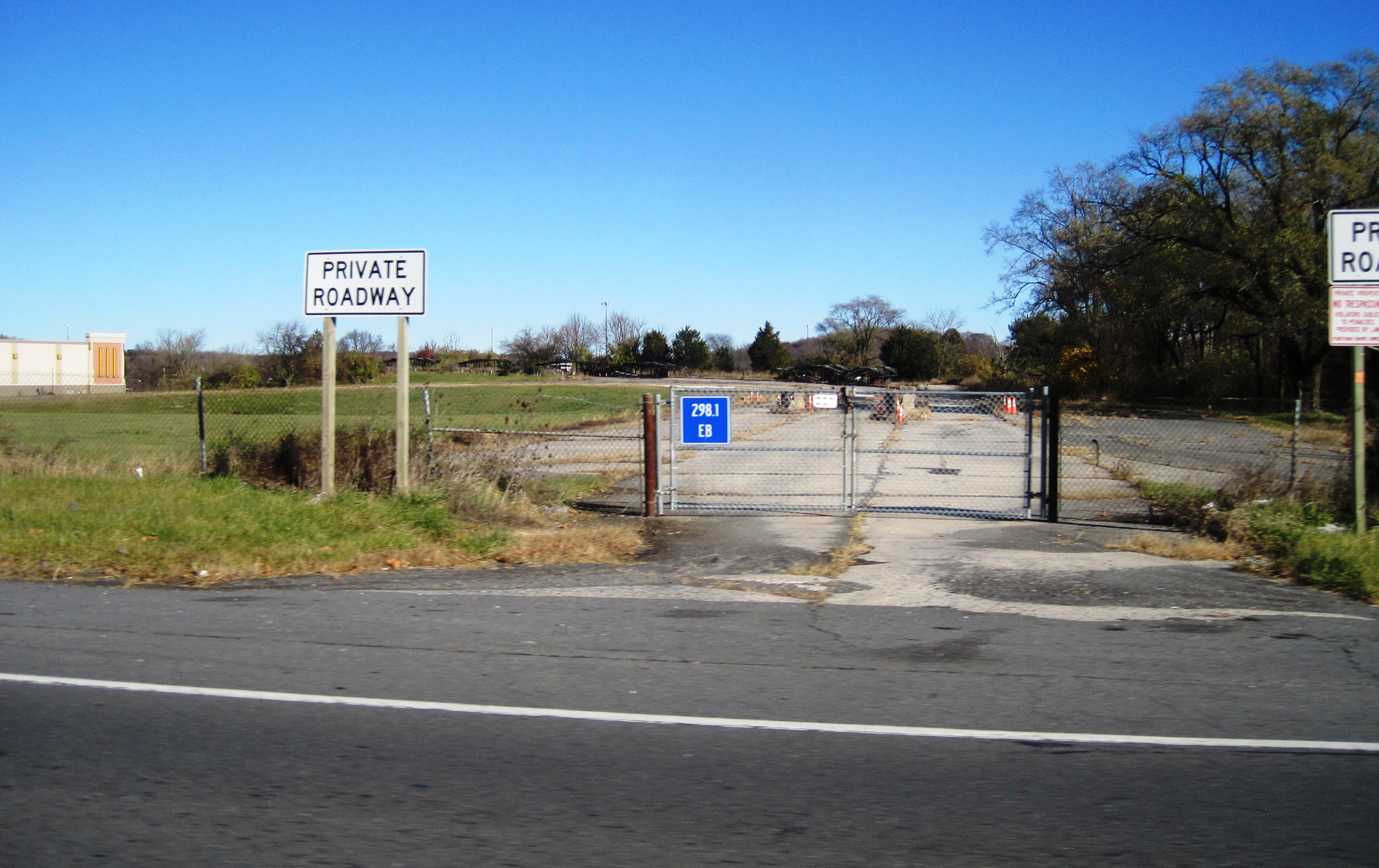
Original Morgantown Interchange in November 2023, after its abandonment

In September 1984, as part of a project to directly connect the turnpike to I-176, the PTC announced plans to replace the Morgantown Interchange. That route had previously been in violation of interstate highway standards, as it had not connected to its parent route. Eight options were considered, with the most expensive being a 2.5 miles (4.0 km) access road that would have connected to the Morgantown end of that road. This would have cost $33,000,000, equivalent to $86.4 million in 2025 This was planned to reduce congestion on PA 10. Ultimately, a simpler design was chosen which extended the road to meet a related trumpet at the turnpike itself. Groundbreaking for the new ramps was held on February 28, 1989. The new interchange was built 1.5 miles (2.4 km) east of the old one, and merged onto the turnpike from the north, rather than the south. However, it was not to have complete access to PA 10, as the old interchange did. The new interchange opened on September 18, 1990, completing the first phase of the Morgantown connector. The overhead lights at the new interchange were considered a nuisance by residents who lived near it. The second phase of the project began in 1994, with the ramps onto I-176 being part of it. On September 27, 1996, these were opened, officially completing the project. which cost $17 million (equivalent to $38.4 million in 2025) split between PennDOT and the PTC.

In Summer 1997, the toll plaza at the Harrisburg West Interchange was expanded and ramps were rebuilt.

In Fall 1998, the PTC completed implementation of the Advanced Traveler Information System (ATIS). It involved the addition of variable message signs, a traffic flow system, a truck rollover system, a camera system, and an over height vehicle detection system.

In early 1999, the PTC began printing coupons on the back of toll receipts.

In July 2000, the PTC began transmitting Highway advisory radio (HAR) signals at all interchanges along the turnpike. Previously, this was only supported at ones connecting to interstate highways.

Construction began on a project to rebuild the five-mile (8.0 km) stretch between milepost 94 and 99 in June 1998. This work involved replacement of the roadbed and overpasses, widening of the median, addition of shoulders, and replacement of drainage. Work was completed in August 2000, and cost $24 million. It marked the first portion of the road to be entirely rebuilt.

A $7,000,000 rehabilitation of the Tuscarora Mountain Tunnel was completed in late 2000. As part of this, the fluorescent lighting was replaced with sodium lighting, new pipes were installed to correct a design flaw that caused deterioration, a new wrecker was introduced to replace the old one, repairs were made to the tiling and ceiling slabs, and the original two fan based backup generators were replaced by four powerful diesel generators as part of upgrades to the power distribution system.

The speed limit was lowered from 65 to 55 miles per hour (105 to 89 km/h) between the New Stanton Interchange and milepost 130 in April 2001. This was due to the section's six degree curves.

In May 1999, reconstruction began on the section between milepost 187 and the Allegheny Mountain Tunnel. The roadbed was rebuilt, overpasses replaced, and shoulders expanded. Work was completed in Summer 2001 at the cost of $50 million.

In Fall 2001, the PTC ran an advertising campaign called "Peace, Love and the Pennsylvania Turnpike". It lasted for 90 days and used tie-dyed billboards that resembled those from the 1970s and carried phrases such as "Rome wasn't built in a day" and "Spread the love. Let someone merge."

In August 1999, the PTC awarded a contract to reconstruct the road between the New Stanton Interchange and milepost 85. In April 2000, massive potholes developed on the stretch of road. This required the portion to be temporarily closed. Soon after, construction on the work began. It involved reconstructing the roadbed, widening the median, and expanding the shoulders. The eastbound lanes were completed in October 2000, while the westbound lanes were finished in October 2002.

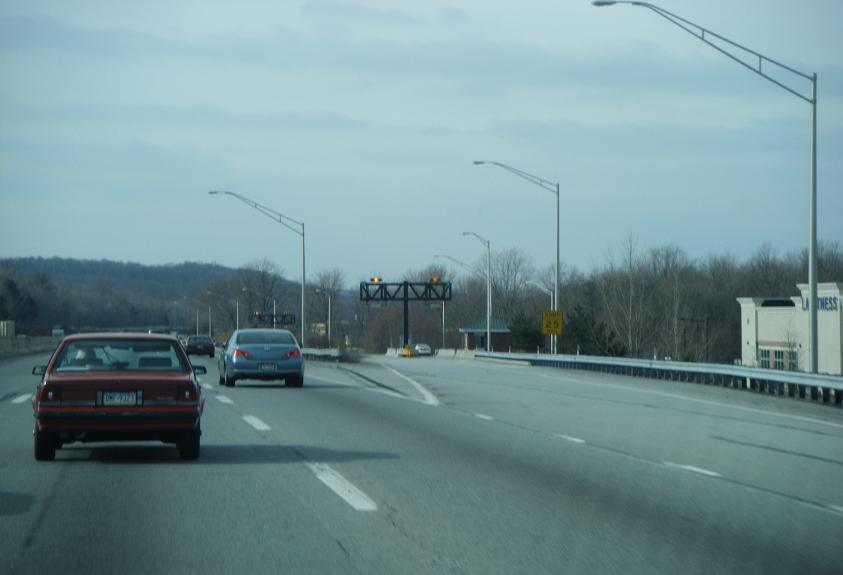
Westbound Virginia Drive slip ramp in Fort Washington

An electronic toll collection system was first proposed in 1990 in which a motorist would create an account, use an electronic device read from an electronic tollbooth, and be billed later. In 1994, alongside many other northeast toll roads, the PTC created an agreement to implement E-ZPass. This tolling system was planned to go into effect by 1998. In 1996, the PTC announced they were considering the addition of slip ramps in the Philadelphia area as part of the conversion. In 1998, it was announced the implementation of the system was postponed until 2000. Construction began on the Virginia Drive slip ramp in early 2000; it would serve westbound traffic. As part of the implementation, the Valley Forge Interchanges Toll Plaza widened from thirteen lanes to seventeen lanes. On December 2, 2000, E-ZPass was introduced from the Harrisburg West Interchange to the Delaware River Bridge Toll Plaza. Concurrently, the new slip ramp onto Virginia Drive opened. On May 19, 2001, E-ZPass was introduced from the Carlisle Interchange to the Gettysburg Pike Interchange. Following this, on December 15, E-ZPass was introduced on the remaining portion from the Blue Mountain Interchange to the Gateway Toll Plaza. On December 14, 2002, the system was introduced to commercial vehicles. Implementation of the system cost $5,100,000 (equivalent to $9.05 million in 2025), and saw improved signage and feedback signals installed at all of the toll plazas. Unlike the rest of the exits, the Virginia Drive Slip ramp was not staffed, meaning no toll collectors were required to be there.

In October 2000, the PTC announced they would gradually switch the exit numbers of interchanges from the sequential system to milepost system. This would be based on how far east the exit was from the Ohio state line. Installation of the new signage occurred in May 2001. By 2003, the old exit numbers had been retired.

In 1987, plans were announced to build the Cranberry Interchange, which would connect the turnpike to I-79 and US 19 in Cranberry Township. It would replace the Perry Highway Interchange, which had only served the latter. These plans were approved in 1993, with a contract issued in November 1995. In 1997, transportation officials agreed on the interchange's design, a drastic simplification of the one initially proposed. The project was planned to include moving the west end of the ticket system from the Gateway Toll Plaza to a new location in Warrendale. This was necessary in order to reduce significant congestion at the Gateway Toll Plaza. The new toll plaza would have standard cash lanes, as well as two express E-ZPass lanes (one in each direction) to let E-ZPass drivers go through the toll plaza at expressway speed. Construction on the first ramps of the Cranberry Interchange began in early 2000. The Warrendale Toll Plaza was delayed by a dispute with Marshall and Pine townships in Allegheny County, who thought that it would cause noise, air, and light pollution. Marshall Township eventually agreed to allow construction in May 2001. Reconstruction of the Gateway Toll Plaza from a ticket facility into a coin drop facility began that October. On top of adding coin drop machinery, the plaza's toll lanes were given better heating and cooling systems. Construction of the Warrendale Toll Plaza itself began in February 2002. The westbound Butler service plaza was soon after closed to allow for right of way for the new plaza, aptly named after Warrendale, to use that already used by the existing turnpike. On June 1, 2003, the new fixed rate Gateway Toll Plaza was opened, the New Castle and Beaver Valley Interchanges had their toll plazas eliminated, the Perry Highway Interchange was closed, and the cash lanes at the Warrendale Toll plaza were opened. The final of the new ramps at the Cranberry Interchange opened on November 12, 2003. In June 2004, the express E-ZPass lanes were completed at the Warrendale toll plaza. The project cost $44 million (equivalent to $73.7 million in 2025), which was split between PennDOT and the PTC.

On July 12, 2001, ground was broken on a project to rebuild the roadway between the Somerset Interchange and Allegheny Mountain Tunnel. Work involved reconstruction of the roadbed to extend its life, expansion of the shoulder and median, as well replacement of seventeen overpasses to accommodate the new shoulders, and a widened median. On March 21, 2002, a $66 million project to rebuild the roadway from mileposts 85 to 94 broke ground. This project reconstructed the Donegal Interchange, rehabilitated seven other overpasses, and built an eastbound truck lane between mileposts 88 and 94 and westbound truck lane between mileposts 93.1 and 92.2. Work on the Allegheny Mountain Tunnel project was originally planned to be completed in Spring 2005 and the Donegal project scheduled to be completed in November 2005, but a fare increase allowed for both to be completed in November 2004.

On November 24, 2004, the day before Thanksgiving, 2,000 Teamsters Union employees went on strike, after contract negotiations failed. This was the first strike in the history of the roadway. As this is usually one of the busiest traffic days in the US, to avoid traffic jams, tolls were waived for the rest of the day. Starting on November 25, turnpike management personnel collected flat-rate passenger tolls of $2 and commercial tolls of $15 from cash customers on the ticketed system, while E-ZPass customers were charged the lesser of the actual toll or the same flat rates. The strike ended after seven days when both sides reached an agreement on November 30, 2004. Normal toll collection resumed December 1, 2004.

On January 29, 2005, the service road at the Reading Interchange was officially named Colonel Howard Boulevard.

The PTC approved raising the speed limit to 65 mph (105 km/h) for the entire length of the turnpike in April 2005. This excluded tunnels, mainline toll plazas, interchange ramps and toll plazas, the portion between the New Stanton Interchange and milepost 130, and the portion between the Bensalem Interchange and the Delaware River Bridge.

In July 2005, the PTC completed a $3,500,000 (equivalent to $5.54 million in 2025) project that eliminated 131 low capacity emergency pull offs along the entire road. These were intended for motorists in an emergency or commercial vehicles needing to stop, but a study completed in June 1998 had determined they were too much of a safety hazard, as commercial vehicles were too big for them. However, this was criticized as making these truckers more likely to stay on the road even when tired, as there was a 2.5 miles (4.0 km) gap between the larger pull offs.

In October 2005, the PTC, in conjunction with PennDOT, completed the addition of four 55 mph (89 km/h) express E-ZPass lanes at the Mid-County Interchange, marking the second of these to be added.

In July 2004, construction began on rebuilding the portion of road between milepost 38 and the Butler Valley Interchange. Work was completed by December 2005.

In March 2007, the PTC announced that it had removed the steps leading to St. John's Church in New Baltimore because they were a safety hazard and violated interstate highway standards.

In December 2005, the PTC began construction on a project to widen the toll plazas, expand the utility buildings, and rebuild the roadway and associated structures at both the Gettysburg Pike Interchange and Lebanon-Lancaster Interchange. The work was completed in October 2007 at a cost of $30 million (equivalent to $47.5 million in 2025).

In September 2000, the PTC announced plans to build a six lane concrete segmental bridge to replace the old four lane deck truss span over the Susquehanna River. Work began on the six-lane bridge, which cost $150 million (equivalent to $245 million in 2025), four years later. In March 2005, as part of the project, work began on realignment of a 1.5 miles (2.4 km) section of roadway near the bridge. In November, work began on improvement of the Harrisburg East Interchange, its toll plaza was expanded to nine lanes, and its ramps replaced to accommodate the widened mainline. A ribbon-cutting was held for completion of the westbound bridge on May 16, 2007, and it opened to traffic the following day. The eastbound bridge opened in June. Demolition of the old bridge began on August 22, and was completed on September 5. The rest of the realignment was completed in June 2008. The entire project cost $150,000,000.

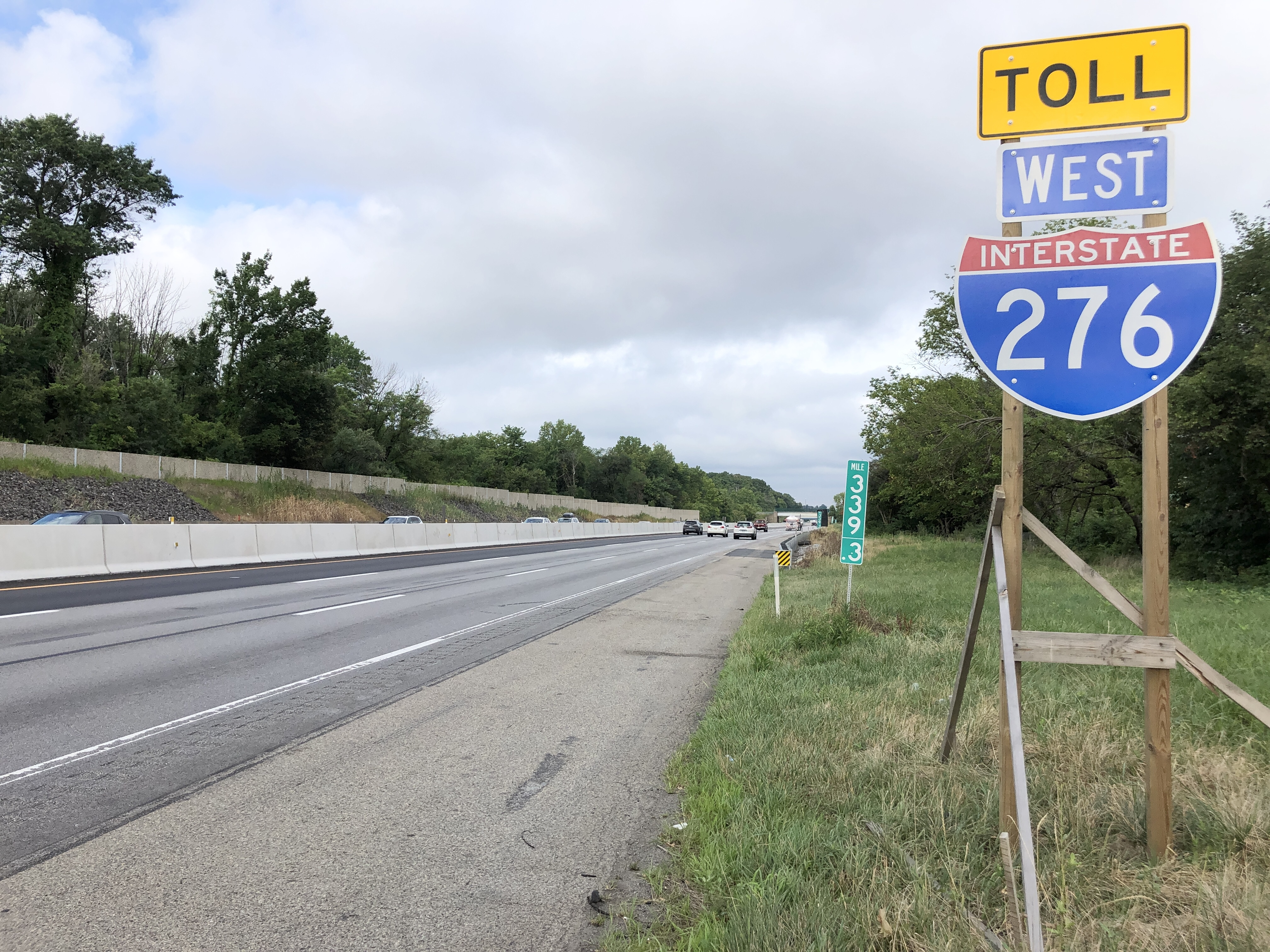
Westbound past the Virginia Drive Interchange in Fort Washington

In November 2006, Governor Ed Rendell and Pennsylvania House Speaker John Perzel proposed leasing the turnpike long-term to a private group to raise money to improve other infrastructure in the state. Such a lease was thought to raise up to $30 billion (equivalent to $46 billion in 2025) for the state. In October 2007, 34 companies submitted 14 proposals to lease the turnpike. On May 19, 2008, a record $12.8-billion (equivalent to $19.1 billion in 2025) proposal by Abertis, a Spain-based firm, and Citigroup in New York City to lease the turnpike was submitted. The consortium withdrew the offer on September 30, 2008, as they reasoned the proposal would not be approved in the state legislature.

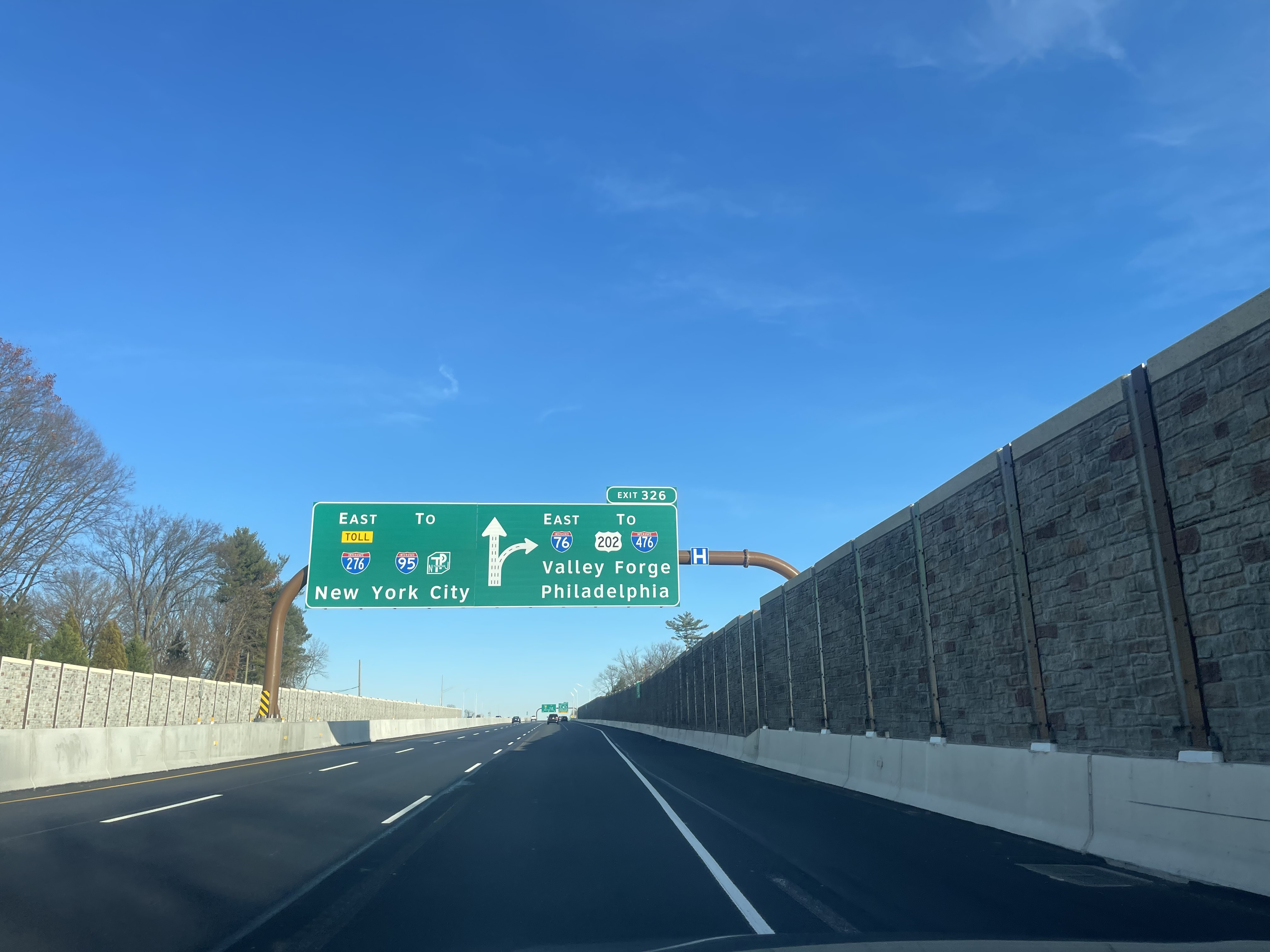
Eastbound at the Valley Forge Interchange, where I-76 splits from the turnpike and I-276 begins

Plans were made to widen the road to six lanes between the Valley Forge Interchange and Norristown Interchange in the 1990s. In order to allow for such, construction began on a second Schuylkill River Bridge in 1998. Work was completed a month early in May 2000. Work on the rest of the widening began in October 2004. As part of the work, the Norristown Interchange had its toll plaza expanded, the E-ZPass lanes were also improved. Work west of the Schuylkill River was completed on December 22, 2006. Work on widening east of the bridge was completed on November 21, 2008. The entire project cost $330 million (equivalent to $484 million in 2025).

A project was undertaken to widen the turnpike to six lanes between the Gateway Toll Plaza and New Castle Interchange. The first phase began in September 2005. This involved rebuilding the overpasses between mileposts 4 and milepost 9, and was completed in November 2006. The second phase, which began in early 2006, involved rebuilding the roadway. It also saw conversion of the Gateway Toll Barrier, from a toll plaza that tolled in both directions with no express lanes, into an eastbound only plaza with express E-ZPass lanes, as had been at the Warrendale Toll Plaza since completion. This phase of work was completed in July 2007. Widening of the section between the Gateway Toll Barrier and the New Castle Interchange began in January 2007 and was completed on May 21, 2009. The entire project cost $132,000,000.

In December 2009, the PTC renamed the Philadelphia Interchange the Bensalem Interchange, as that town had petitioned. With this, tickets at the toll plaza were updated, and signage replaced.

=== 2010s–present ===
On April 28, 2010, Governor Ed Rendell proposed that maintenance of the turnpike be taken over by PennDOT. A special session of the state legislature voted on this issue on May 4, choosing not to go with this plan.

Plans were announced to build a pair of concrete replacement bridges over the Allegheny River in 2005. Work began in May 2007. As with the Susquehanna River Work, the turnpike was partially replaced to meet with the new bridges. The Allegheny Valley Interchange ramps onto the turnpike was demolished and rebuilt as to meet with the new alignment. A dedication ceremony was held on October 23, 2009. The bridges, which cost $194 million (equivalent to $283 million in 2025), opened to traffic the following day. Demolition of the old bridge began after, a controlled implosion to take down part of it occurred on July 13, 2010, a second implosion occurred on July 30 to try to bring down another other half, though this failed, with workers having to weld the superstructures piers in strategic locations until the remaining portion of the structure fell down. Work on the $193,600,000(equivalent to $28.2 million in 2025) project was largely completed when the westbound bridge was opened on November 15.

Plans were made for an eastbound slip ramp with PA 132 in 2004. This was to provide better access to Parx Casino and Racing, one of the biggest gambling facilities in Pennsylvania, which had been causing congestion at the nearby interchanges since its opening in 1974. In order to allow for this, the South Neshaminy Service Plaza was permanently closed on July 30, 2007. A contract for this in May 2009, and construction began that November. The ramp was opened to traffic on November 22, 2010, at the cost $7,400,000 (equivalent to $10.6 million in 2025).

In December 2010, the PTC announced they were considering the removal of toll rates from tickets. Ultimately, after backlash, they announced this would not occur in January 2011.

In 2005, plans were announced to widen the road to six lanes between the Irwin Interchange and New Stanton Interchange. As part of the project, the Hempfield Service Plaza was closed in January 2007. Work was completed in November 2011.

On July 23, 2009, widening of the roadway to six lanes began between the Warrendale Toll Plaza and Butler Valley Interchange. Work involved replacing three overpasses, and building a new alignment between milepost 32.4 and milepost 35.5. It was completed in November 2012 at the cost of $113,000,000.

On September 26, 2012, the PTC began a program to introduce a new ATIM system. These printed new tickets, which were 1.75 inches longer, printed on thermal paper, and lacked magnetic strips the old tickets had. In addition, the tickets were not preprinted, meaning that more ink was saved in comparison to the old system. The first two interchanges to get the new machines were the Willow Hill and Lebanon-Lancaster Interchanges. After this test was completed, starting on October 1, the new machines were installed at the rest of the low volume interchanges, and by December 6, the high volume interchanges had also transitioned to the new system. This was done because the old ATIM system had become obsolete, and if left in use past 2012, they would have been expensive to maintain due to a shortage of parts.

In 1998, plans were announced for the construction of a slip ramp to provide an entrance to the turnpike eastbound from PA 252 in Tredyffrin Township. Residents opposed the plan, fearing that it would impact the area, which was in close proximity to Valley Forge National Historical Park. In 1999, the commission altered these plans so that a ramp would be built at PA 29 in Devault instead, providing access to the nearby Great Valley Corporate Center. The PTC approved funding for the slip ramp in 2002, but the project was temporarily put on hold for several years due to engineering and design problems. It was announced that the commission would approve construction of the slip ramp at PA 29 in August 2010, and construction began the following March. The new ramp became the only full E-ZPass-only interchange, as it was accessible in all movements. It opened on December 11, 2012; Governor Tom Corbett cut the ribbon.

On June 22, 2012, the PTC began a $4.5 million project to reconstruct the Somerset Interchanges access road. Some of the old connections to local roads were eliminated, and two new ones were created to supplement them. This was completed in Summer 2013.

On June 17, 2014, the road was officially dedicated as a Blue Star Memorial Highway, in honor of the veterans who served at the PTC.

In 2014, reconstruction began on a stretch of the Laurel Hill Tunnel bypass between milepost 99 and milepost 102. This involved replacement of the bridge carrying the Laurel Highlands hiking trail across the turnpike at milepost 101, reconstruction of the roadbed, replacement of the drainage, and replacement of the median. This was completed in October 2015, at the cost of $39,000,000.

The speed limit was increased to 70 mph (110 km/h) between the Blue Mountain and Morgantown interchanges on July 22, 2014, as part of a test. On March 15, 2016, the PTC approved raising the speed limit on the remainder of the turnpike to 70 mph (110 km/h) except for sections posted with a 55-mile-per-hour (89 km/h) limit; the speed limit increased to 70 mph (110 km/h) on the 65-mile-per-hour (105 km/h) sections of the road on May 3 of that year. It remains 55 mph (89 km/h) in construction zones, tunnels, and the portion between the Bensalem Interchange and the New Jersey state line.

On April 22, 2014, a groundbreaking ceremony was held to reconstruct the road between mileposts 250 and 252. Work on this $47.65 million project, which also installed sound barriers, was completed in August 2016.

In 2015, implementation of support for credit and debit cards on ATIMs began, with the first interchange to get it being Willow Hill. By October of the following year, the entire road accepted the new payment option. This was meant as a last resort for cash users who ran out of money before reaching their destination, because of this, it was the least used of the three toll options.

In November 2016, the PTC completed a project that rebuilt the road at milepost 128 in order to eliminate a known rockslide area.

The turnpike had originally used traffic lights as feedback signals for E-ZPass users. On March 17, 2017, the PTC announced that it would remove these alongside an upgrade to the toll equipment; they did not conform to federal signage guidelines.

In September 2017, the PTC removed call boxes due to increased mobile-phone use.

In 2013, work began on a widening to six lanes between the Harrisburg West Interchange and Susquehanna River Bridge. Overpass replacement began that year, with construction on the actual road widening beginning in 2014. Work on the project was completed in Spring 2018 at the cost of $92,000,000.

A project was undertaken to widen the road to six lanes between the Blue Mountain Tunnel and the Carlisle Interchange. This work involved replacement of the underpass at the Blue Mountain Interchange with an overpass, reconstruction of eighteen overpasses, and realignment of a short portion near the tunnel's portal. Business owners in the area had proposed building a slip ramp near the Carlisle Interchange in order to reduce congestion, though this did not occur. Work was completed by the end of 2018 at the cost of $500,000,00.

In early 2015, the PTC completed addition of ticket processing machines (TPMs) at the Willow Hill Interchange. These allowed non E-ZPass users to pay much faster, as rather than handing in the ticket then handling cash and awaiting change, they could simply feed the ticket into a dispenser and receive a confirmation record. Following this, in January 2019, they were implemented at the Fort Littleton Interchange and Blue Mountain Interchange.

In September 2019, the turnpike launched a smartphone app for paying tolls.

In August 2013, construction began on a project to widen the road to six lanes between the Butler Valley and Allegheny Valley Interchanges. Work involved reconstructing bridge structures, with the sole exception being the McClelland Road underpass, which was fully demolished. It was completed on October 17, 2019, at the cost of $200 million.

In March 2017, construction began on improvements to the Donegal Interchange. A new traffic signal and realigned intersection end were built. This was completed in October 2020.

In 2021, construction began on a project to widen the road to six lanes between the Cranberry Interchange and Warrendale Toll Plaza. It was completed in September 2022.

Reconstruction of the ramps into US 1 from the Bensalem Interchange began in November 2018 and was completed in December 2022.

In May 2019, the PTC began a project to rehabilitate the Tuscarora Mountain Tunnel. As part of this, the eastbound bore ceiling was rebuilt to taking on a new arch ceiling, while both were given new LED lighting, improved conduit, new tiling with better waterproofing, new variable messages signs, a water collection system, and new, wider driving lanes and a resurfaced approach road with repaired bridges. They also replaced the ventilation, repainted the portals, replaced the switch gears and generators, as well as expanding the guard office space. Work was completed in January 2024.

Construction to widen the section between milepost 102 and the Somerset Interchange began in January 2021. It involved bypassing some curves of the turnpike with new ones. Work was completed in August 2024.

In October 2024, support for Apple Pay and Google Pay was introduced.

In 2026, reconstruction will be completed between milepost 126 and 131.

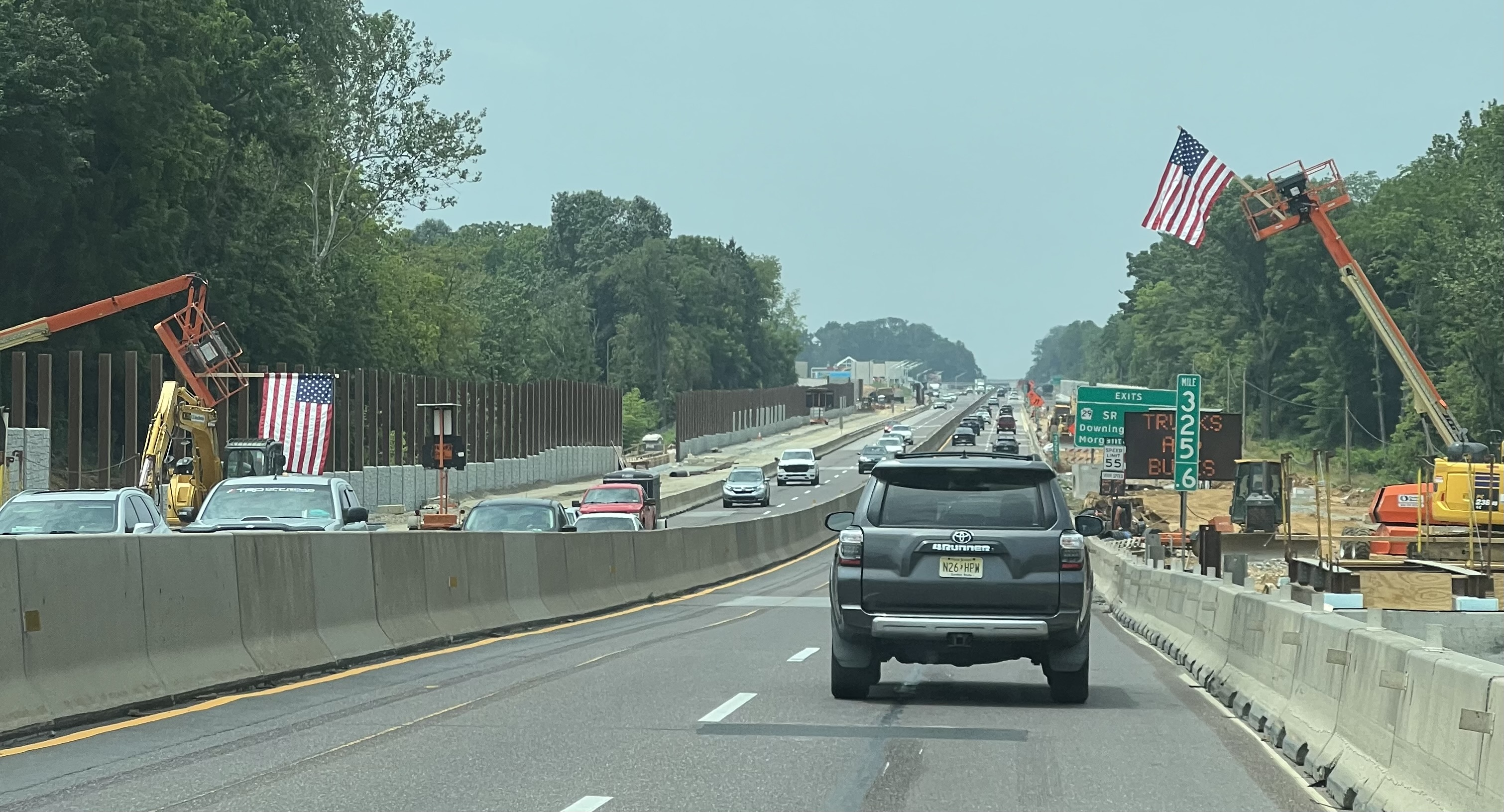
Reconstruction and widening project between the PA 252 overpass and the Valley Forge Interchange

In 2004, plans were announced to widen the highway to six lanes between the Downingtown Interchange and Valley Forge Interchange. Three years later, the project's western terminus was scaled back from Downingtown to the then-proposed PA 29 slip ramp. Plans for the widening were presented to the public in 2009. Later that year, the widening was put on hold because of engineering problems; it resumed in 2010. Work was scheduled to begin in 2013, with completion in 2015. In October 2012, the project was postponed a year because of delays in permit approvals. The project was split into two phases: the first between the PA 252 overpass and the Valley Forge Interchange, and the other between the SR 29 Interchange and the PA 252 overpass. Construction on the first phase began on September 27, 2021, with the new lanes opening to traffic in October 2024 and all work completed in May 2025. Construction on the second phase began in early 2026, and is expected to be completed in 2031. Reconstruction and widening of the turnpike from the Downingtown Interchange east to the Valley Hill Road overpass began in early 2023. As part of the project, the ramps at the Downingtown Interchange were rebuilt, and new lanes opened to traffic in October 2026.

Additional plans in January 2013 called for widening the road to six lanes between the Morgantown Interchange and Downingtown Interchange. Overpasses along the stretch are currently being reconstructed in preparation for the widening. Initially expected to begin in 2018 and be completed by 2020, it has since been rescheduled.

In 2012, the PTC announced that they were planning to replace the Beaver River Bridge, the last deck truss bridge. While not structurally deficient, it has a similar design to the I-35W Mississippi River Bridge, which collapsed in 2007, and is functionally obsolete. As part of this, the Beaver Valley Interchange was also to be rebuilt from a trumpet interchange into a partial diamond interchange. Soon after, they set aside nearly $300 million to replace the bridge, and began the design phase. In September 2013, the PTC began the work, which would at first replace a number of bridges between mileposts 12 and 14. This was completed in November 2017, allowing for future widening from four to six lanes. The first phase was completed in December 2022 and the PTC began the second phase: the widening to six lanes. In September 2024, as part of the project, temporary ramps at the Beaver Valley Interchange were opened so that the old ones could be systematically demolished. Work is expected to be competed in September 2027 at a cost of $292 million.

In 2010, McCormick Taylor and Wilbur Smith Associates were hired by the PTC to conduct a feasibility study on converting the road to all-electronic tolling. On March 6, 2012, the turnpike commission announced that it was implementing this plan. The turnpike commission projected that it would save $65 million annually on labor costs by eliminating toll collectors. The first plazas to be converted were the toll plazas at the end of the turnpike. The Delaware River Bridge's toll plaza was demolished and replaced with a westbound all-electronic barrier in January 2016, becoming the first on the turnpike to do so. On October 27, 2019, all-electronic tolling was implemented at the express lanes at the Gateway Toll Barrier. All-electronic tolling was originally scheduled to be implemented on the mainline between Warrendale and Neshaminy Falls, as well as on the Northeast Extension, in late 2021. In March 2020, the turnpike made the switch early as a result of the COVID-19 pandemic. With this, interchanges that had been previously restricted to use by E-ZPass users (the SR 29 Interchange, as well as the Virginia Drive and Street Road slip ramps) had this restriction removed. The all-electronic tolling system on the turnpike will initially use toll booths at exits until mainline toll gantries between interchanges are constructed. Construction on the gantries began in 2023. They also determined a new tolling structure would be implemented, with tolls calculated based on length rather than weight. Toll gantries were activated on January 5, 2025, on the Northeast Extension and on the mainline turnpike east of the Reading Interchange. The gantries on the rest of the mainline will be in operation by January 2027. Demolition of the toll plazas will be completed by mid-2028.

In 2025, the PTC created Turnpike TV, a series of videos giving detailed coverage and information about construction, future projects, and community initiatives regarding the turnpike.

==== Interstate 95 Interchange Project ====
Plans for an interchange between the turnpike and I-95 in Bristol Township to connect portions of I-95 in Pennsylvania and the New Jersey Turnpike were proposed in 1978. The roads did not have an interchange because earlier laws (since repealed) prohibited federal funds from being used to connect toll roads. In 1982, the federal government mandated that the interchange be built in Pennsylvania. A gap existed on I-95 because of the unbuilt Somerset Freeway segment in central New Jersey. Under the plan, I-95 would be rerouted off of its original alignment through Trenton, and routed onto the portion of turnpike between the new interchange and the New Jersey state line. This would result in the elimination of I-276 along the 3 miles (4.8 km) stretch, now terminating east at the interchange. I-95 would follow the Pearl Harbor Extension, which ends at the mainline New Jersey Turnpike. This would create a continuous route through New Jersey, and allow for I-295 to be extended. Area residents who thought the interchange would lead to a decline in their quality of life opposed the plan. An environmental impact statement (EIS) was released in 2003, with this it was revealed that the project would also included widening and a new eastern end of the ticket system to be located before the interchange. The interchange received environmental approval in 2004, the preliminary design was completed in 2008, and the final design followed.

The project involved building a high-speed interchange between the roads. A new toll plaza was built east of the Street Road Interchange at Neshaminy Falls to mark the eastern end of the ticket system. It consisted of high-speed E-ZPass lanes and ticket and cash booths, and the former Delaware River Bridge toll barrier converted to serve westbound traffic only, and the Delaware Valley Interchange had its toll plaza removed. A new bridge was to be built over the Delaware River. Work on the project began in late 2010, and two bridges over the turnpike were replaced in 2011. Groundbreaking for the interchange with I-95 took place on July 30, 2013, with Governor Corbett in attendance. The project's first stage, which includes the new toll plaza, widening and flyover ramps between I-95 and the turnpike, was projected to cost $420 million and the flyover ramps were projected to cost $142.9 million, with $100 million from federal funds and the remainder from the turnpike commission. The PTC borrowed money from foreign investors to fund the project, and the commission entered a partnership with the Delaware Valley Regional Center (DVRC) in 2014 to raise half the funds needed to construct the interchange. The EB-5 visa program was projected to allow the commission, through the DVRC, to save about $35 million of traditional borrowing costs over five years. Construction of the interchange's first stage, the Neshaminy Falls Toll Plaza, began later that year. The Neshaminy Falls Toll plaza opened in January 2016, after which the Delaware Valley Interchange and Delaware River Bridge toll plazas were demolished, with the latter being replaced by a westbound fixed rate toll gantry. Signage was also updated at the Delaware Valley Interchange to remove its name. Flyover ramps between northbound I-95 and the eastbound turnpike and between the westbound turnpike and southbound I-95 opened on September 22, 2018. This completed I-95, which runs from Florida north to Maine. Part of the Interstate Highway System, it serves over 110 million people in over 10 percent of the total US land area. Its development began as part of the Federal-Aid Highway Act in 1956. With this, the portion of the turnpike between the new interchange and the New Jersey state line became part of I-95 while the eastern terminus of I-276 was cut back to the new interchange. Signs depicting turnpike shields and mile markers were removed, with signs depicting I-95 mile markers and shields were put in their place. Exit 358 was also renumbered as exit 42, being based on I-95 exit numbers. The exit 42 ramp to US 13 was rebuilt from a trumpet into an at-grade intersection, this was completed in 2020.

Long-term plans call for the construction of missing connections with I-95 and I-295, as well as and widening the turnpike to six lanes between the Bensalem Interchange and New Jersey state line. This would include the reconstruction of the exit 42's ramps from and off of the turnpike, as well a replacement of the Delaware River Bridge with a new span, which is expected to begin construction in 2025 at the earliest. The remaining stages of the project are unfunded, with an estimated cost of $1.1 billion. Once this project is completed, the entire road between the Downingtown Interchange and New Jersey state line will be six lanes wide.

== Future ==
=== Breezewood widening ===
On September 24, 2024, the PTC announced plans to widen the stretch between mileposts 160 and 163 to six lanes; this would also involve replacement of the Breezewood Interchange to add a new grade-separated connection between the turnpike and I-70. The project is planned to begin its preliminary design phase in 2025, with construction underway by 2027.

=== Montgomery County interchange improvements ===
In 2000, slip ramps were proposed as part of a revitalization plan to connect the turnpike with Lafayette Street in downtown Norristown. Construction of an extension to Lafayette Street began in 2013, and was completed the following year. On January 7, 2015, the commission committed $45 million (equivalent to $59.6 million in 2025) to building the interchange. The commission's Fiscal Year 2017 Capital Plan included $66 million (equivalent to $85.1 million in 2025) for the Lafayette Street Interchange. The design phase began in 2017, with preliminary engineering in 2018 and 2019. Construction of the Lafayette Street Interchange is expected to begin in 2029 and be completed in 2031. The project will involve construction of ramps at Lafayette Street that will serve all westbound movements, while ramps connecting to nearby Ridge Pike will serve eastbound movements. The interchange will be located at milepost 331. The proposed slip ramp is projected to cost $160 million (equivalent to $284 million in 2025). Montgomery County officials have proposed a surcharge for the new exit to help pay for the project.

Along with the new interchange at Lafayette Street, Montgomery County has proposed additional improvements to the segment of the turnpike that runs through the county. In 2015, the county initiated the "Turnpike Corridor Reinvestment Project", which calls for the construction of the Lafayette Street Interchange, along with potential new interchanges with Henderson Road in King of Prussia (milepost 329) and PA 63 (milepost 342) near Willow Grove. For existing interchanges in the county (Valley Forge, Fort Washington, Virginia Drive, and Willow Grove), the project calls for the modernization of these interchanges and the addition of slip ramps, particularly the completion of the Virginia Drive Interchange to serve eastbound movements.

=== Allegheny Mountain Tunnel replacement ===
A 1996 study on improving the Allegheny Mountain portion by building a replacement tube or a cut was made. Based on the study, the commission planned to replace the deteriorating tunnel with a cut through the mountain. These plans were postponed indefinitely in 2001 because it would cost $93.7 million (equivalent to $162 million in 2025), though were revived in 2009. The nearby Mountain Field and Stream Club prefers that the tunnels be improved or a new tube built rather than the bypass. The narrow Allegheny Mountain Tunnel is deteriorating, with disintegrating ceiling slabs and outdated lighting and ventilation. On October 22, 2013, the PTC announced plans to replace the tunnels (the older of which was 73 years old) with new tunnels or a bypass due to the age and condition of the 1940 tunnel and the need for additional capacity. About 11 million vehicles use the tunnel every year. On December 24, 2014, the PTC announced that it was going forward with plans to replace the Allegheny Mountain Tunnel. Six options are being considered, three of which would include bypasses via rock blasting; the other three would involve boring two new tunnels (presumably three lanes each) to accommodate the PTC's long-term plans to widen the mainline turnpike to six lanes except for the tunnels. If the PTC builds new tunnels, the existing Allegheny Mountain Tunnels would be closed to traffic and repurposed. Although the projected costs for a bypass would be less than half that of boring new tunnels and would require $3 million less for annual maintenance of each tunnel, the Mountain Field and Stream Club (a local hunting group which owns 1,000 acres (400 ha) of land around the tunnel) opposed the replacement option; the group had also opposed plans to replace the tunnels in 2001. In February 2020, the PTC decided that the tunnel would be bypassed with a new road to the south. Such a plan is expected to be cheaper and have less environmental impact than a new tunnel. The project is under environmental review; design is expected to take three to four years, and construction will take another three years. The bypass will be six lanes, with a truck climbing lane westbound. The new alignment will include an overpass for use by wildlife that use the forests above the tunnel, and a new underpass would be built to replace the existing culvert at the Raystown Branch Juniata River. Another new underpass will be built at PA 160, directly parallel to the existing one. They would also replace the maintenance facility that currently resides on the westbound side at the western portal of the tunnel with a new one located on the bypass. The new road will cost an estimated $332.4 million. If this project is to be competed, then hazardous vehicles would no longer need to exit at interchange before it on both directions of the turnpike.

=== Widening between the Pittsburgh Interchange and Irwin Interchange ===
The PTC made plans to widen the portion of roadway between the Pittsburgh and Irwin Interchanges to six lanes. As part of this, on July 16, 2019, they voted to allocate $30 million to its 10-Year Capital Plan for a new interchange connection between the turnpike and PA 130 in Penn Township between exits 57 and 67. Overpasses began being replaced, and, on October 28, 2021, it was announced that design work on the project would begin, with the entire project estimated to be completed by 2038. However, a traffic study completed in August 2026 found that PA 130 does not yet have the infrastructure to support the additional traffic that would be caused by a connection to the turnpike, and the project has been put on hold by the PTC since then.

=== PA 981 interchange ===
On August 18, 2026, the PTC announced plans to construct a new interchange connection between the turnpike and PA 981 in Mount Pleasant Township around milepost 80.8.

=== PA 283 connection ===
On August 19, 2026, the PTC announced plans to construct ramps that would directly connect the turnpike with the PA 283 freeway around milepost 251. The project is intended to reduce congestion at the Harrisburg East Interchange, where drivers on the turnpike must exit onto I-283 to then access PA 283. The two new ramps will provide access from the turnpike eastbound to PA 283 eastbound and from PA 283 westbound to the turnpike westbound. The project is expected to be completed by the end of 2031.

== Exit list ==
Mileposts are based on those signed, meaning they may not reflect actual distance from the Ohio state line.

County	Location	mi	km	Old exit	New exit	Name	Destinations	Notes
Lawrence	North Beaver Township	0.00	0.00	–	–		I-76 Toll west / Ohio Turnpike west – Ohio	Continuation into Ohio; western end of I-76 concurrency
Lawrence	North Beaver Township	1.43	2.30	Gateway Toll Gantry (E-ZPass or toll-by-plate; eastbound toll)				
Beaver	Big Beaver	10.70	17.22	1A	10	New Castle	I-376 Toll – New Castle, Pittsburgh	Exit 26 on I-376; last westbound exit before toll
Beaver	Big Beaver	12.87	20.71	2	13	Beaver Valley	PA 18 – Ellwood City, Beaver Falls	
Beaver	Beaver River	13.0– 13.3	20.9– 21.4	Beaver River Bridge				
Butler	Cranberry Township	28.47	45.82	3	28	Cranberry	I-79 / US 19 – Pittsburgh, Erie	Exit 77 on I-79; access to Old Economy Village State Historic Site; replaced the former Perry Highway Interchange; last eastbound exit before toll
Allegheny	Marshall Township	33.00	53.11	Toll Gantry (E-ZPass or toll-by-plate)				
Allegheny	Hampton Township	39.10	62.93	4	39	Butler Valley	PA 8 – Pittsburgh, Butler	Formerly called the North Pittsburgh Interchange
Allegheny	Harmar Township	47.73	76.81	5	48	Allegheny Valley	PA 28 – New Kensington, Pittsburgh	Access via Freeport Road
Allegheny	Allegheny River	47.8– 48.2	76.9– 77.6	Allegheny River Bridge				
Allegheny	Plum	49.30	79.34	Oakmont Plum Service Plaza (eastbound)				
Allegheny	Monroeville	56.44	90.83	6	57	Pittsburgh	I-376 west / US 22 – Pittsburgh, Monroeville	Eastern terminus and exit 85 on I-376; access to North Shore Destinations; to US 22 Bus.
Westmoreland	North Huntingdon Township	67.22	108.18	1; 7	67	Irwin	US 30 – Irwin, Greensburg, McKeesport	Signed for Greensburg eastbound, McKeesport westbound; western terminus of original roadway
Westmoreland	New Stanton	75.39	121.33	2; 8	75	New Stanton	I-70 west / US 119 / PA Turnpike 66 north – Greensburg, Wheeling, WV	Western end of I-70 concurrency; access to US 119/PA 66 via SR 3091; access to Washington, PA, Columbus, OH, Connellsville, and Delmont
Westmoreland	Hempfield Township	77.60	124.89	New Stanton Service Plaza (westbound)				
Westmoreland	Mount Pleasant Township	80.8	130.0		81	SR 981	PA 981	Proposed
Westmoreland	Donegal Township	90.69	145.95	3; 9	91	Donegal	PA 31 / PA 711 – Ligonier, Uniontown	Access to PA 711 via PA 31
Somerset	Somerset	109.91	176.88	4; 10	110	Somerset	US 219 – Somerset, Johnstown	Access via PA 281; access to Flight 93 National Memorial
Somerset	Somerset Township	112.30– 112.40	180.73– 180.89	North Somerset Service Plaza (westbound); South Somerset Service Plaza (eastbound)				
Somerset	Stonycreek–Allegheny township line	122.7– 123.9	197.5– 199.4	Allegheny Mountain Tunnel				
Bedford	Bedford Township	145.50	234.16	5; 11	146	Bedford	I-99 north / US 220 – Bedford, Altoona	Access via US 220 Bus.; access to Blue Knob State Park, Shawnee State Park, and Cumberland, MD
Bedford	Bedford Township	147.30	237.06	North Midway Service Plaza (westbound); South Midway Service Plaza (eastbound)				
Bedford	East Providence Township	161.50	259.91	6; 12	161	Breezewood	US 30 to I-70 east – Everett, Baltimore	Everett not signed eastbound; eastern end of I-70 concurrency
Fulton	Taylor Township	172.30	277.29	Sideling Hill Service Plaza (both directions)				
Fulton	Dublin Township	179.44	288.78	7; 13	180	Fort Littleton	US 522 – McConnellsburg, Mount Union	
Huntingdon–Franklin county line	Dublin–Metal township line	187.3– 188.3	301.4– 303.0	Tuscarora Mountain Tunnel				
Franklin	Metal Township	188.59	303.51	8; 14	189	Willow Hill	PA 75 – Willow Hill, Fort Loudon	
Franklin	Fannett–Lurgan township line	198.5– 199.4	319.5– 320.9	Kittatinny Mountain Tunnel				
Franklin	Lurgan Township	199.5– 200.3	321.1– 322.4	Blue Mountain Tunnel				
Franklin	Lurgan Township	201.29	323.94	9; 15	201	Blue Mountain	PA 997 – Shippensburg, Chambersburg	
Cumberland	Hopewell Township	202.50	325.89	Blue Mountain Service Plaza (westbound)				
Cumberland	West Pennsboro Township	219.10	352.61	Cumberland Valley Service Plaza (eastbound)				
Cumberland	Middlesex Township	226.54	364.58	10/11; 16	226	Carlisle	I-81 / US 11 – Carlisle, Harrisburg, Chambersburg	Signed for Harrisburg eastbound, Chambersburg westbound; access to US Army War College and US Army Heritage Center; replaced the former Middlesex Interchange; eastern terminus of original roadway
Cumberland	Upper Allen Township	236.22	380.16	17	236	Gettysburg Pike	US 15 – Gettysburg, Harrisburg	Access to Harrisburg State Capital
York	Fairview Township	241.87	389.25	18	242	Harrisburg West	I-83 – York, Baltimore, Harrisburg	Exit 39B on I-83; access to Harrisburg State Capital
Susquehanna River		246.5– 247.3	396.7– 398.0	Susquehanna River Bridge				
Dauphin	Lower Swatara Township	247.38	398.12	19	247	Harrisburg East	I-283 north / PA 283 east – Harrisburg, Hershey	Southern terminus of I-283; exit 1A on PA 283; access to Harrisburg International Airport and Harrisburg State Capital
Dauphin	Lower Swatara Township	249.70	401.85	Highspire Service Plaza (eastbound)				
Dauphin	Londonderry Township	251.60	404.91		251	SR 283	PA 283	Proposed; estimated for completion by 2031
Dauphin–Lebanon county line	Conewago–South Londonderry township line	258.80	416.50	Lawn Service Plaza (westbound)				
Lancaster	Rapho Township	266.45	428.81	20	266	Lebanon–Lancaster	PA 72 – Lebanon, Manheim, Lancaster	Signed for Manheim eastbound, Lancaster westbound; interchange name not signed eastbound; access to Cornwall Iron Furnace State Historic Site and Hershey
Lancaster	East Cocalico Township	286.09	460.42	21	286	Reading	US 222 / PA 272 – Reading, Ephrata, Lancaster	Signed for Ephrata eastbound, Lancaster westbound; access via SR 1040 (Colonel Howard Boulevard); access to Ephrata Cloister and Landis Valley Museum
Lancaster	Brecknock Township	289.90	466.55	Bowmansville Service Plaza (eastbound)				
Lancaster	Brecknock Township	291	468	Toll Gantry (E-ZPass or toll-by-plate)				
Berks	Caernarvon Township	298.33	480.12	22	298	Morgantown	I-176 north / PA 10 to PA 23 – Morgantown, Reading	Southern terminus of I-176; access to Daniel Boone Homestead State Historical Site
Chester	Wallace Township	304.80	490.53	Peter J. Camiel Service Plaza (westbound)				
Chester	Upper Uwchlan Township	310	500	Toll Gantry (E-ZPass or toll-by-plate)				
Chester	Uwchlan Township	311.93	502.00	23	312	Downingtown	PA 100 – Pottstown, West Chester	Access to Hopewell Furnace National Historic Site
Chester	Uwchlan Township	312	502	Toll Gantry (E-ZPass or toll-by-plate)				
Chester	Charlestown–East Whiteland– Tredyffrin township tripoint	319.33	513.91	–	320	SR 29	PA 29 – Phoenixville, Malvern	Interchange name not signed
Chester	Tredyffrin Township	322	518	Toll Gantry (E-ZPass or toll-by-plate)				
Chester	Tredyffrin Township	324.50	522.23	Valley Forge Service Plaza (eastbound)				
Montgomery	Upper Merion Township	326.62	525.64	24	326	Valley Forge	I-76 east to I-476 / US 202 – Philadelphia, Valley Forge I-276 begins	Eastern end of I-76 concurrency; western terminus of I-276; access to Valley Forge National Historical Park
Montgomery	Upper Merion Township	328.40	528.51	King of Prussia Service Plaza (westbound)				
Montgomery	Upper Merion Township	331	533	Toll Gantry (E-ZPass or toll-by-plate)				
Montgomery	Schuylkill River	331.0– 331.3	532.7– 533.2	Schuylkill River Bridge				
Montgomery	Plymouth Township	331.6	533.7		–	Lafayette/Ridge	Lafayette Street / Ridge Pike – Norristown	Proposed; estimated for completion by 2031
Montgomery	Plymouth Township	333	536	Toll Gantry (E-ZPass or toll-by-plate)				
Montgomery	Plymouth Township	333.28	536.36	25	333	Norristown	I-476 south – Chester, Norristown	I-476/Chester not signed westbound; access to Norristown via Plymouth Road; exit 20 on I-476
Montgomery	Plymouth Township	334.5	538.3	–	–		I-476 Toll north / Penna Turnpike NE Extension north – Allentown	Southern terminus of Penna Turnpike NE Extension; former PA 9; exit 20 on I-476
Montgomery	Plymouth Township	334.5	538.3	25A	20	Mid-County	I-476 south – Chester	Westbound exit and eastbound entrance; exit no. corresponds to I-476
Montgomery	Whitemarsh Township	336	541	Toll Gantry (E-ZPass or toll-by-plate)				
Montgomery	Upper Dublin Township	338.36	544.54	26	339	Fort Washington	PA 309 – Philadelphia, Ambler	Access to Hope Lodge State Historic Site
Montgomery	Upper Dublin Township	339.80	546.86	26A	340	Virginia Drive	Virginia Drive	Westbound exit and entrance; no trucks; interchange name not signed
Montgomery	Upper Dublin Township	341	549	Toll Gantry (E-ZPass or toll-by-plate)				
Montgomery	Upper Moreland Township	342.91	551.86	27	343	Willow Grove	PA 611 – Doylestown, Jenkintown	Access to Graeme Park State Historic Site
Bucks	Lower Southampton Township	349	562	Toll Gantry (E-ZPass or toll-by-plate)				
Bucks	Bensalem Township	351.49	565.67	28	351	Bensalem	US 1 to I-95 south – Philadelphia, Trenton	I-95 not signed westbound; formerly named the Philadelphia Interchange
Bucks	Bensalem Township	351.89	566.31	–	352	Street Road	PA 132 (Street Road)	Eastbound exit and entrance; interchange name not signed
Bucks	Bensalem Township	352.67	567.57	Toll Gantry (E-ZPass or toll-by-plate)				
Bucks	Bristol Township	41.1	66.1	–	–		I-95 south – Philadelphia I-276 ends	Westbound exit and eastbound entrance; eastern terminus of I-276; western end of I-95 concurrency; continuation of turnpike via exit 40 of I-95; last westbound exit before toll
Bucks	Bristol Township	42.4	68.2	29; 358	42	Delaware Valley	US 13 – Levittown, Bristol	Access to Pennsbury Manor and Washington Crossing
Delaware River		43.7	70.3	Delaware River–Turnpike Toll Bridge (E-ZPass or toll-by-plate; westbound toll)				
Delaware River		43.7	70.3	–	–		I-95 north / Pearl Harbor Extension east to N.J. Turnpike – New Jersey, New York	Continuation into New Jersey; eastern end of I-95 concurrency
1.000 mi = 1.609 km; 1.000 km = 0.621 mi: Concurrency terminus; Electronic toll collection; Closed/former; Incomplete access; Route transition; Unopened

== In popular culture ==
- Country music composer George Vaughn Horton wrote Pennsylvania Turnpike, I Love You So, as performed by Dick Todd.
- The 1973 Billy Joel song "You're My Home" includes the lyric, "Home could be the Pennsylvania Turnpike".
- In 2000, the Pennsylvania Turnpike appeared in the Russian film Brother 2.
- The lyrics to the 2004 song "Probable Cause" by Why? references uses the Pennsylvania Turnpike as the song's setting.
- In 2009, the Pennsylvania Turnpike is used as a backdrop in the film adaptation of Cormac McCarthy's novel The Road.

== See also ==
- List of toll roads in the United States

== Sources ==
- Cupper, Dan (1990). The Pennsylvania Turnpike: A History. Lebanon, Pennsylvania: Applied Arts Publishers. ISBN 0-911410-90-2. OCLC 22150783.
