= List of crossings of the Beaver River =

This is a complete list of bridges and dams that span the Beaver River from its confluence at the Mahoning River and the Shenango River to its mouth at the Ohio River, near Pittsburgh.

== Crossings ==
Crossing	Carries	Location	Coordinates
=== Pennsylvania ===
Moravia Bridge	PA 168	Taylor Township and North Beaver Township	
Beaver River Railroad Bridge	Norfolk Southern	Taylor Township and New Beaver	
Chewton-Wampum Bridge	PA 288	Wayne Township and Wampum	
Wampum Viaduct Bridge	Norfolk Southern	Wayne Township and Wampum	
Koppel Railroad Bridge (abandoned)	former Pittsburgh and Lake Erie Railroad	North Sewickley Township and Koppel	
Fifth Avenue Bridge	PA 351	North Sewickley Township and Koppel	
Beaver Valley Bridge	I-76 (Pennsylvania Turnpike)	North Sewickley Township and Big Beaver	
Eastvale Bridge (John F. Kennedy Memorial Bridge)	PA 588	Eastvale and Beaver Falls	
Eastvale Dam		Eastvale and Beaver Falls	
Canal Dam		New Brighton and Beaver Falls	
Seventh Avenue Bridge	PA 18	New Brighton and Beaver Falls	
Beaver Falls-New Brighton Railroad Bridge	Norfolk Southern Railway	New Brighton and Beaver Falls	
Fallston Dam		New Brighton and Fallston	
Fallston Bridge		New Brighton and Fallston	
Veterans Memorial Bridge		New Brighton and Bridgewater	
Rochester-Bridgewater Bridge		Rochester and Bridgewater	
Rochester-Beaver Bridge	PA 51 / PA 68	Rochester and Bridgewater	
Rochester-Beaver Railroad Bridge	Norfolk Southern Railway	Rochester and Bridgewater	
