= Beaver Bridge =

Beaver Bridge may refer to:

- Beaver Bridge (Ohio River), a rail bridge between Monaca and Beaver, Pennsylvania, U.S.
- Beaver Bridge (Arkansas), a historic road bridge in Beaver, Arkansas, U.S.
- Beaver Covered Bridge, or North Oriental Covered Bridge, in Perry Township, Snyder County, Pennsylvania, U.S.
- Beaver River Bridge, across the Beaver River in North Sewickley Township, Beaver County, Pennsylvania, U.S.
- Beaver River Railroad Bridge, across the Beaver River in New Brighton, Pennsylvania, U.S.
- Rochester-Beaver Railroad Bridge, across the Beaver River between Rochester and Bridgewater, Pennsylvania, U.S.

== See also ==
- Beaver Creek Bridge (disambiguation)
- Beaver Dam Bridge, near Murdochville, Quebec, Canada, that collapsed in 1963
- Beaver Dam Bridge, or Van Sandt Covered Bridge, in Solebury Township, near New Hope in Bucks County, Pennsylvania, U.S.
