= Beaver Crossing =

Beaver Crossing may refer to the following places:

- Beaver Crossing, Alberta, Canada
- Beaver Crossing, Nebraska, U.S.

== See also ==
- Beaver Bridge (disambiguation)
- Beaver River (disambiguation)
- List of crossings of the Beaver River in Pennsylvania, U.S.
