= Zelienople Municipal Airport =

Airport in Fombell, Pennsylvania, US

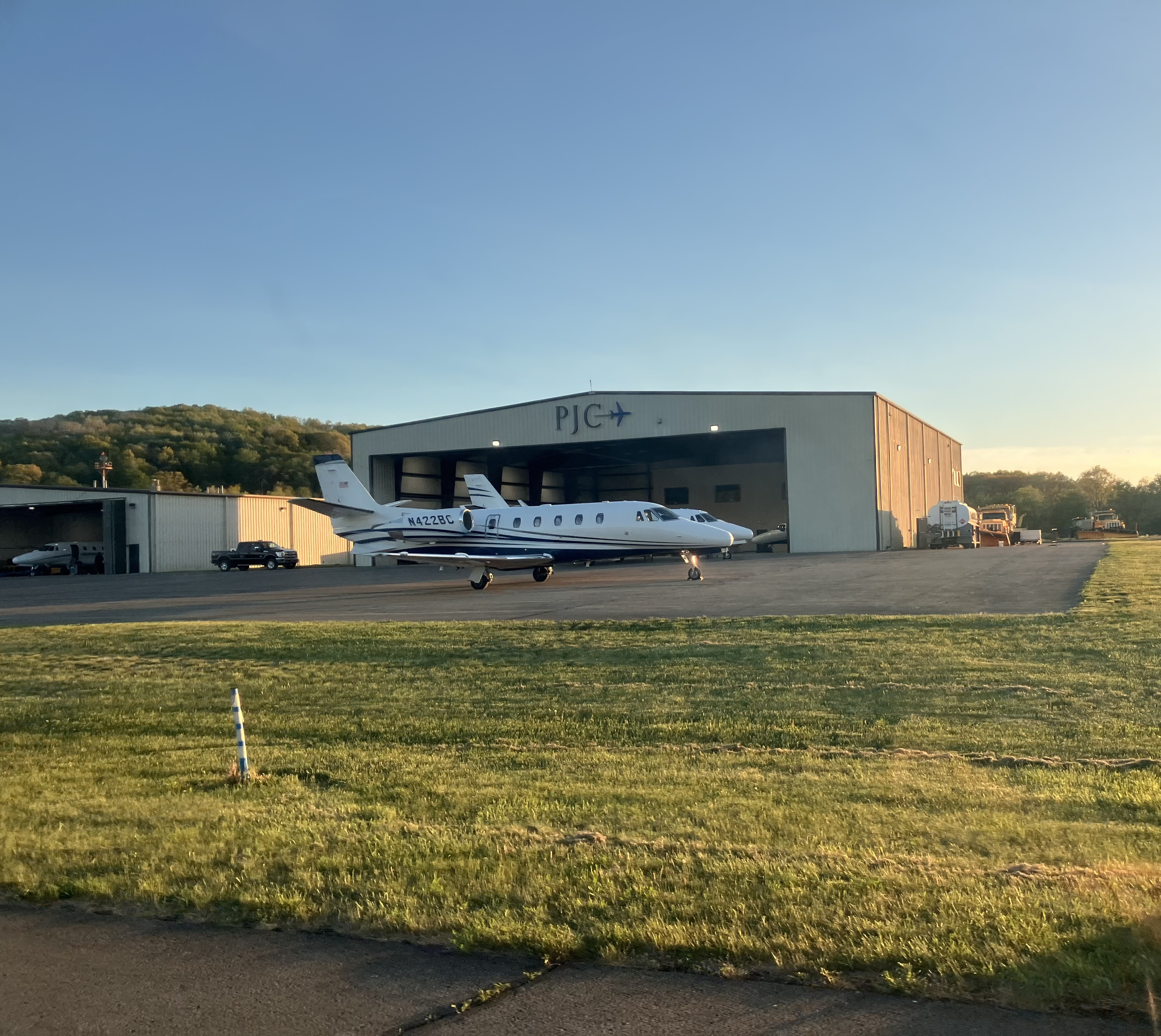
- Hangars at Zelienople Municipal Airport
- IATA: none; ICAO: KPJC; FAA LID: PJC

Summary
- Airport type: Public
- Owner: Borough of Zelienople
- Operator: Zelienople Municipal Authority
- Serves: Zelienople, Pennsylvania
- Location: Fombell, Franklin Township, Beaver County
- Elevation AMSL: 898 ft / 274 m
- Coordinates: 40°48′07″N 080°09′39″W
- Website: https://zelienopleairport.com/

Maps
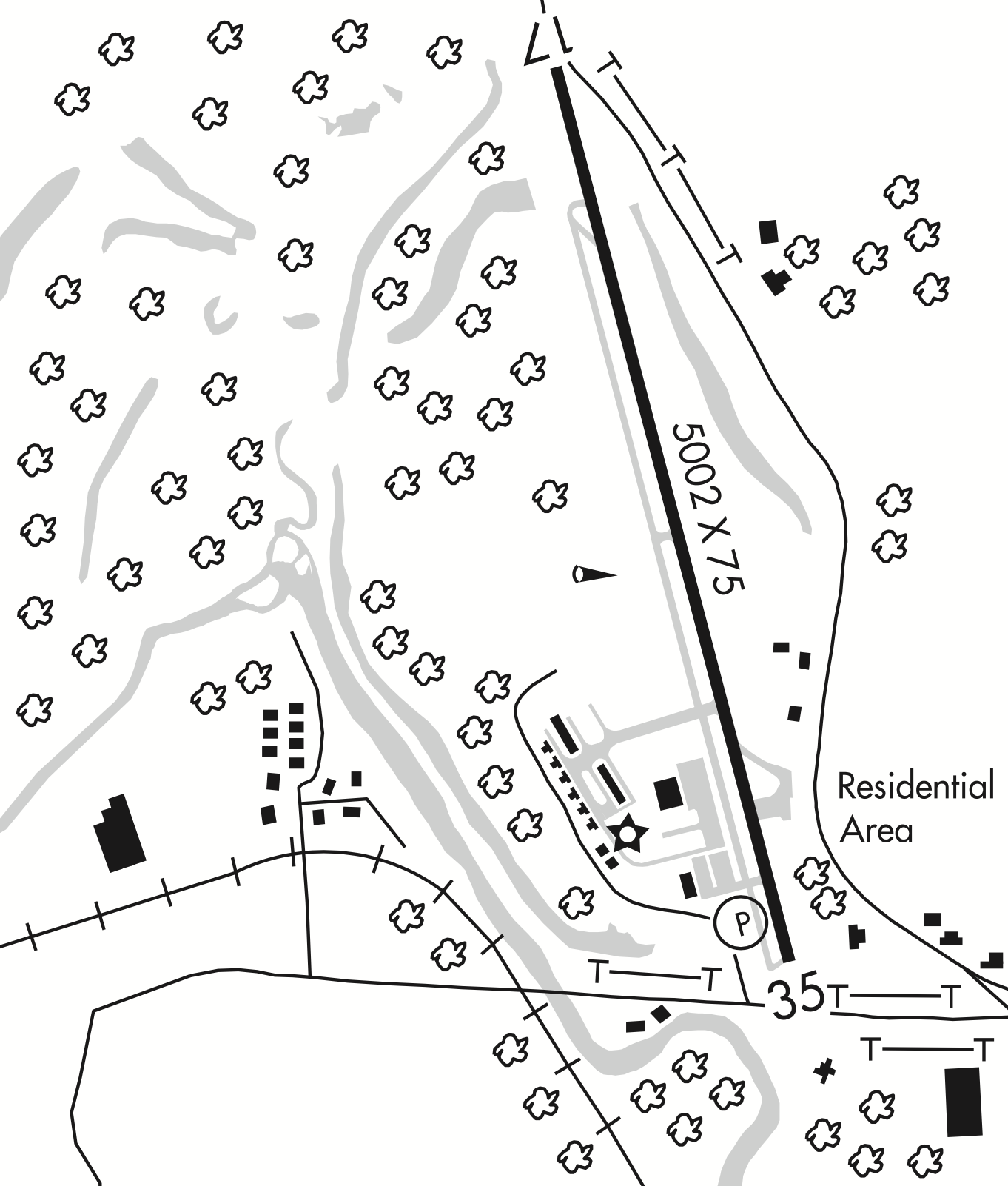

- Location of airport in Pennsylvania PJC (the United States)

Runways
Direction	Length		Surface
Direction	ft	m	Surface
17/35	5,002	1,525	Asphalt

Statistics (2011)
- Aircraft operations: 27,789
- Based aircraft: 35
- Source: Federal Aviation Administration

Zelienople Municipal Airport (ICAO: KPJC, FAA LID: PJC) is a public airport in Beaver County, Pennsylvania, a mile west of Zelienople, a borough in Butler County, Pennsylvania, in the Pittsburgh metropolitan area. The airport is owned by the Borough of Zelienople and operated by the Zelienople Municipal Authority. The National Plan of Integrated Airport Systems for 2011–2015 categorized it as a general aviation facility.

The airport began service in 1958, and is one of many medium-sized airports north of Pittsburgh.

Most U.S. airports use the same three-letter location identifier for the Federal Aviation Administration and IATA, but this airport is PJC to the FAA and has no IATA code. (IATA assigned PJC to Pedro Juan Caballero Airport in Pedro Juan Caballero, Paraguay.)

== Location ==
The airport serves the community of Zelienople in Butler County, but the airport is over the county line in Beaver County, in Fombell, Pennsylvania, Franklin Township. It is one of many medium-sized airports north of Pittsburgh. The airport is between PA 288 and PA 588.

== Facilities ==
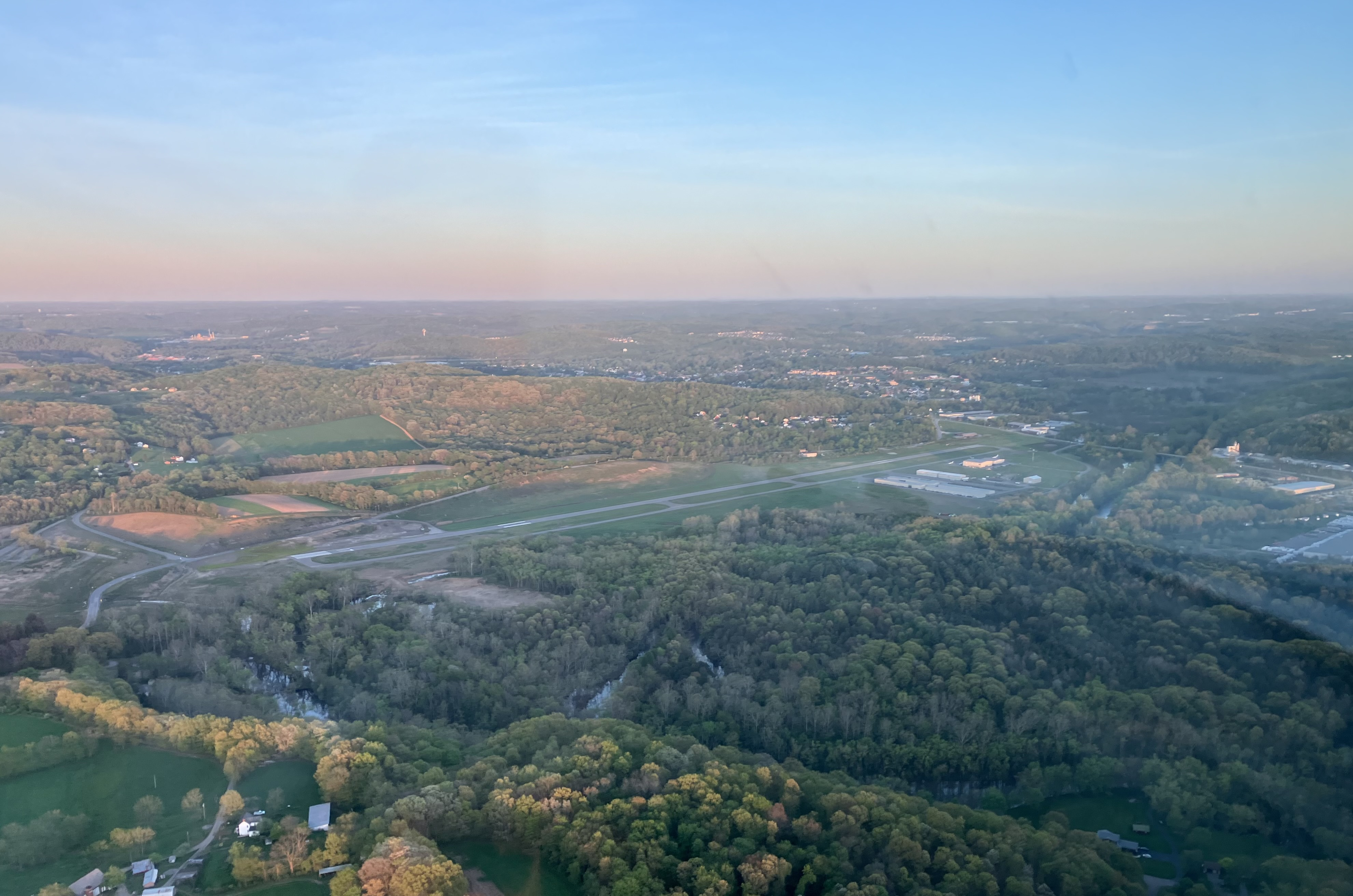
Aerial photograph of the airport at pattern altitude

The airport covers 291 acres (118 ha) at an elevation of 898 feet (274 m). Its one runway, 17/35, is 5,002 by 75 feet (1,504 x 23 m) asphalt.

In the year ending August 22, 2011 the airport had 27,789 aircraft operations, average 76 per day: 94% general aviation and 6% air taxi. 35 aircraft were then based at this airport: 71% single-engine, 11% multi-engine, 11% jet, and 6% helicopter.

Fire response consists of two engines, one tanker, one brush truck, one squad, and command vehicle.

== See also ==
- List of airports in Pennsylvania
