= Fallston Bridge =

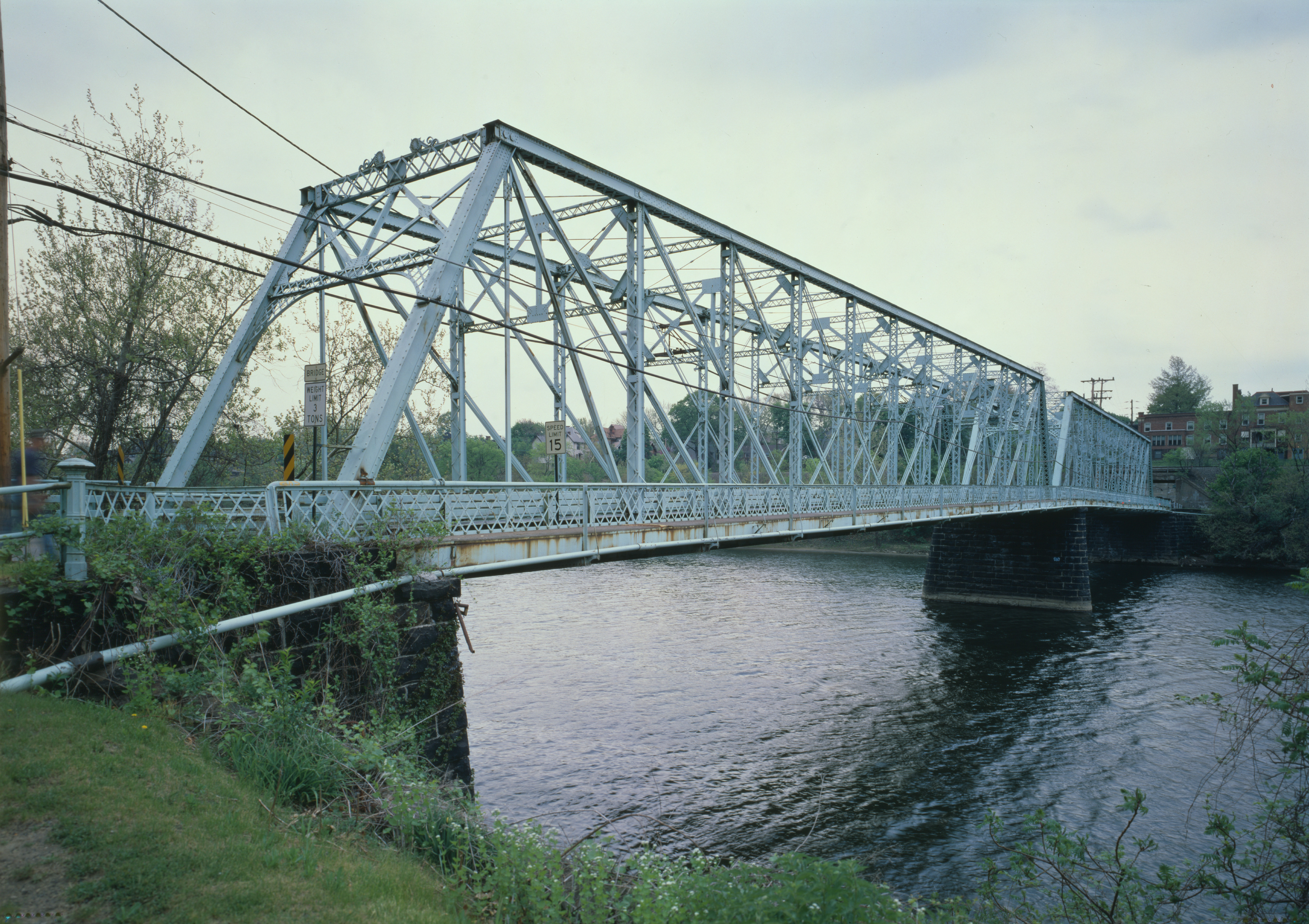
- Coordinates: 40°43′39″N 80°18′36″W
- Carries: Front Street
- Crosses: Beaver River
- Locale: New Brighton and Fallston, Pennsylvania

Characteristics
- Design: Truss bridge
- Total length: 406 feet (124 m)
- Width: 18 feet (5.5 m)

History
- Opened: 1884
- Closed: February 17, 2015

The Fallston Bridge is a historic structure that crosses the Beaver River between the boroughs of New Brighton, and Fallston, Pennsylvania. The bridge was opened in 1884 to replace a tolled, wooden 1836 structure that was destroyed during a major flood. Crossing under a low-clearance railroad underpass on one side of the river and featuring a sharp approach ramp on the opposite shore, the dated structure is insufficiently designed for modern traffic and is often hazardous during rainy conditions. Although it was rehabilitated in 2003, the bridge still received only a 2 out of 100 rated from the Department of Transportation in terms of its structural status.

With a 3-ton weight limit in effect but various truck traffic in need of a nearby crossing due to the presence of a titanium plant, a new structure was built just downstream. The Veterans Memorial Bridge opened on May 26, 2014, after which it is estimated that the Fallston Bridge would carry only 15 percent of its previous traffic volume.

On February 17, 2015, Beaver County officials closed the bridge after a waterline burst, causing damages to the sidewalk and supports to the pedestrian section of the bridge. Before the closing, studies showed that the bridge needed $370,106.8 in repairs just to bring the bridge up to code. On March 4, 2015, officials decided to keep the bridge closed permanently. It is not expected to be demolished anytime soon due to demolition work costing an estimated $994,910.9.

== See also ==
- List of bridges documented by the Historic American Engineering Record in Pennsylvania
- List of crossings of the Beaver River
