= Eastvale Bridge =

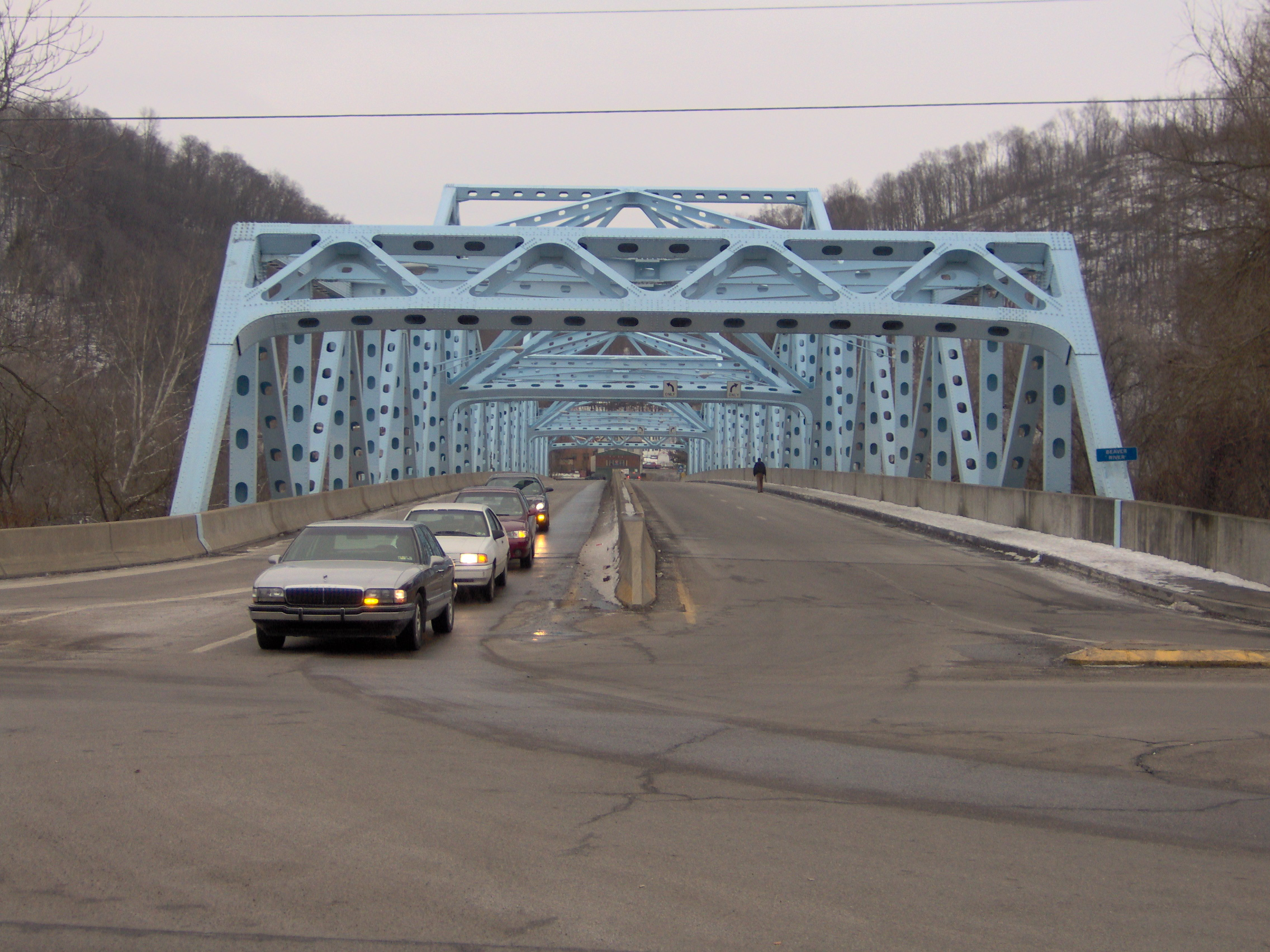
- Coordinates: 40°45′59″N 80°19′02″W
- Carries: PA 588 and pedestrians
- Crosses: Beaver River
- Locale: Beaver Falls and Eastvale, Pennsylvania
- Official name: John F. Kennedy Memorial Bridge
- Other name(s): Blue Bridge

Characteristics
- Longest span: 110 metres (360 ft)

History
- Opened: November 22, 1963

Statistics
- Toll: Free both ways

The Eastvale Bridge is a bridge that carries PA Route 588 over the Beaver River between the borough of Eastvale, and the city of Beaver Falls, Pennsylvania. The bridge, which replaced the Fetterman Bridge that was constructed in 1884 and rebuilt with concrete and steel in 1921, opened in Beaver County on November 22, 1963, the day President John F. Kennedy was assassinated. The bridge was named in his honor. Today, it is commonly known as the Eastvale Bridge, or the "Blue" Bridge by Geneva College students, who have a sweeping view of the bridge in the neighborhood of College Hill.

== See also ==
- List of crossings of the Beaver River
