= Pennsylvania Route 588 =

State highway in Pennsylvania, US

Pennsylvania Route 588

Route information
- Maintained by PennDOT
- Length: 15.5 mi (24.9 km)

Major junctions
- West end: PA 51 in Chippewa Township
- PA 18 in Beaver Falls; PA 65 in North Sewickley Township; PA 288 in Zelienople
- East end: US 19 / PA 68 / PA 288 in Zelienople

Location
- Country: United States
- State: Pennsylvania
- Counties: Beaver, Butler

Highway system
- Pennsylvania State Route System; Interstate; US; State; Scenic; Legislative
← PA 582	→ PA 590

Pennsylvania Route 588 (PA 588) is an east–west state highway in the Western Pennsylvania counties of Beaver and Butler. It travels sixteen miles between PA 51 in Chippewa Township, Beaver County and PA 288 in Zelienople. Other communities through which it passes include the city of Beaver Falls and the borough of Eastvale.

== Route description ==
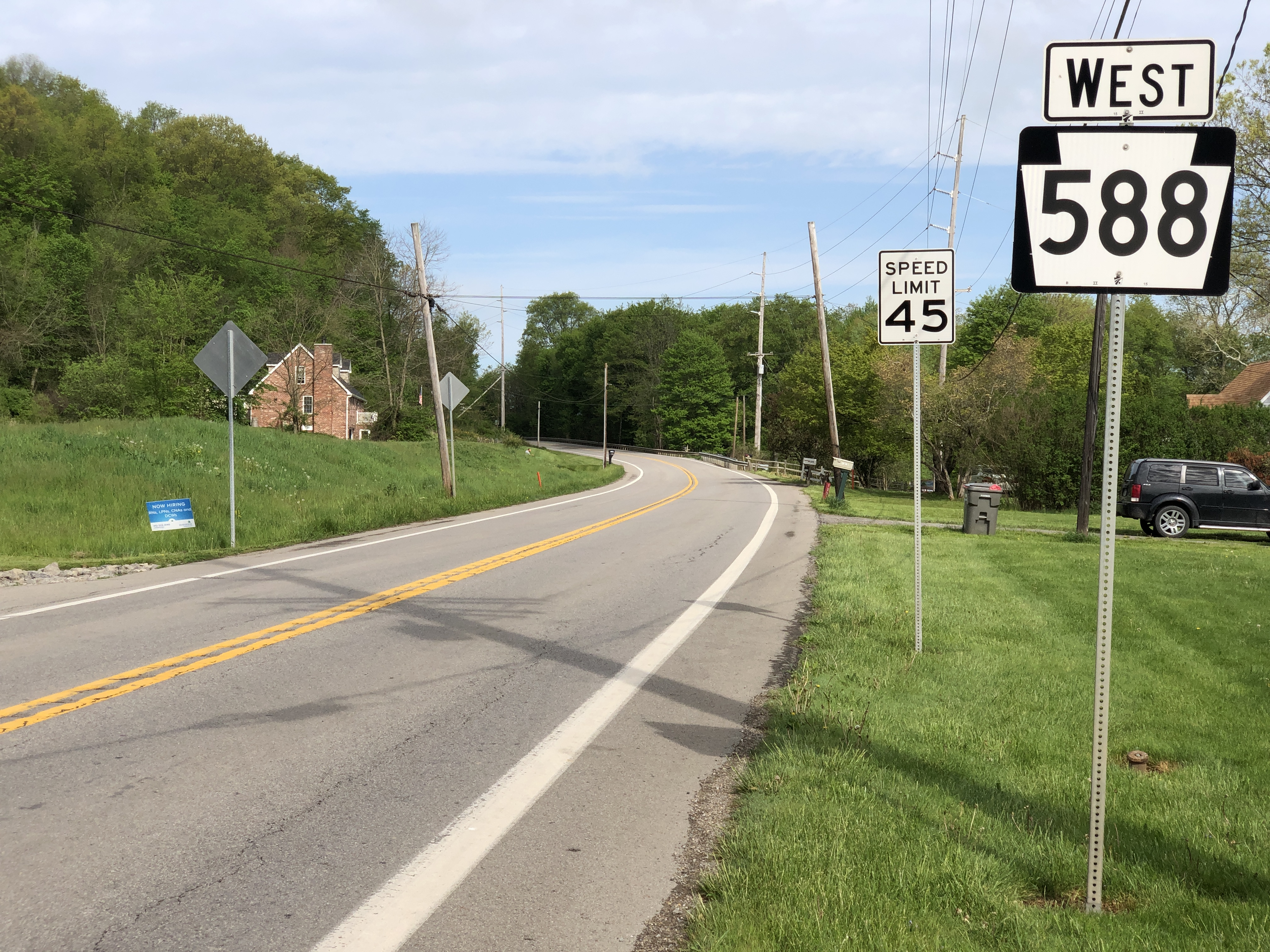
PA 588 westbound in Marion Township

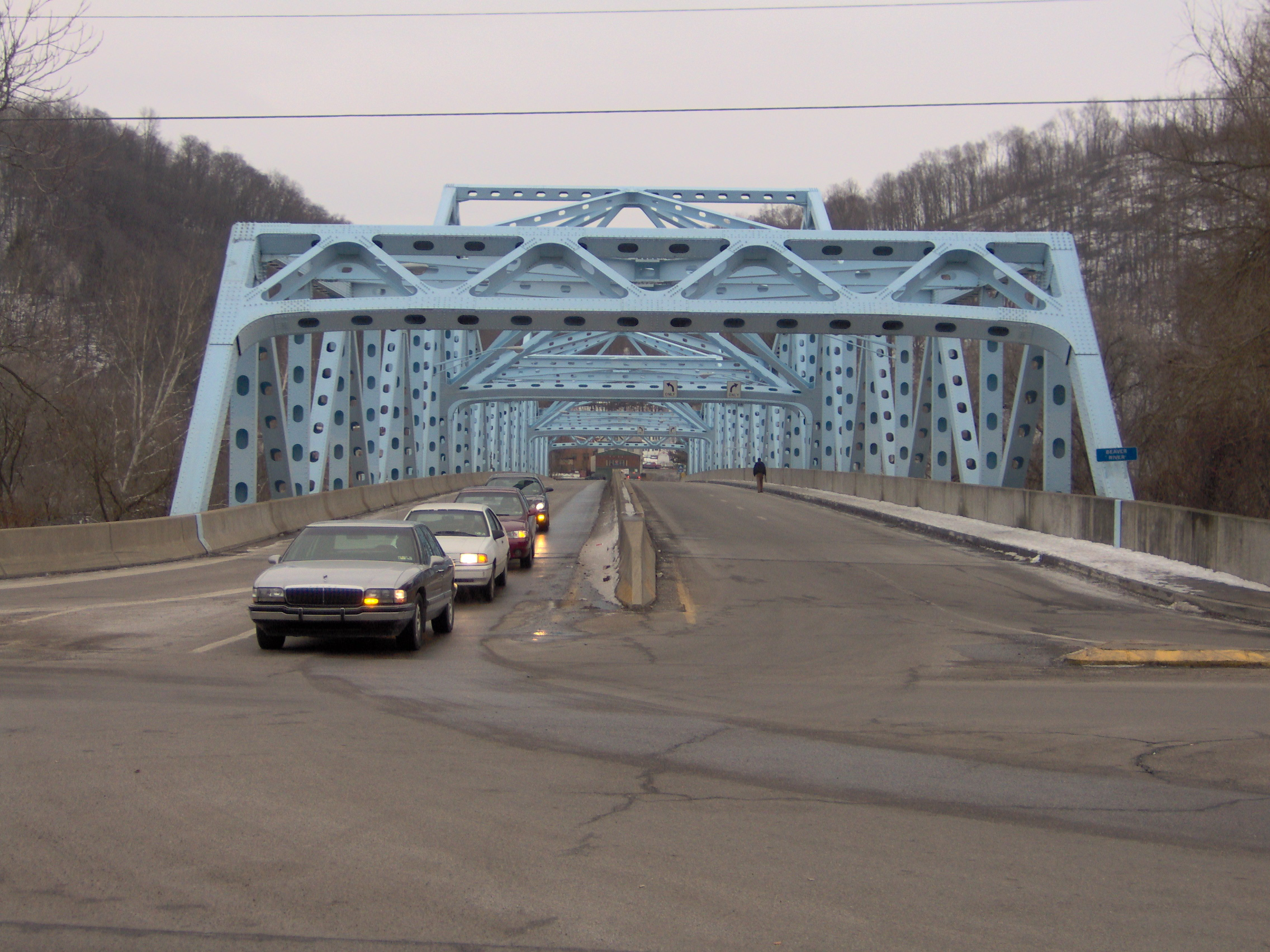
PA 588 uses the Eastvale Bridge to cross the Beaver River between Beaver Falls and Eastvale

PA 588 begins at an intersection with PA 51 in Chippewa Township, Beaver County, heading southeast on two-lane undivided Darlington Road. The road briefly runs to the northeast of PA 51 before turning east into residential areas, passing over I-376. The route heads southeast through more neighborhoods before turning northeast onto Steffin Hill Road and crossing into White Township. PA 588 passes through Steffens Hill and runs east through wooded areas near White Township Park. The road passes a few homes before passing under Norfolk Southern's Fort Wayne Line, at which point it heads into the city of Beaver Falls. The route turns southeast onto 24th Street, curving east into commercial areas. PA 588 intersects PA 18 and turns north to form a concurrency with that route on 7th Avenue, a two-lane divided highway that passes homes. PA 588 splits from PA 18 by turning east onto four-lane divided 4th Street. The route comes to the Eastvale Bridge, a truss bridge which carries it over CSX's Pittsburgh Subdivision railroad line before crossing the Beaver River into the borough of Eastvale and passing over Norfolk Southern's Youngstown Line. PA 588 turns north onto two-lane undivided 2nd Avenue East and passes several homes. The road heads into North Sewickley Township and becomes Bennetts Run Road, heading into forested areas and turning east. The route heads through more wooded areas with some residences and turns to the northeast.

PA 588 turns east and crosses PA 65, at which point it becomes Concord Church Road and passes through a mix of farmland and woodland with some homes. The route passes under I-76 (Pennsylvania Turnpike) and heads into open agricultural areas with occasional residences. The road heads to the southeast and runs between farms to the north and woods to the south before continuing into forests. PA 588 heads east into a mix of farms and woods, crossing into Marion Township and becoming an unnamed road that passes through Fombell. The route curves to the northeast and enters open agricultural areas, curving to the northwest before a turn to the north. PA 588 continues into areas of farms and woods with some homes, turning to the east. The road continues through rural areas with some development, curving southeast as it heads into more wooded surroundings and runs to the south of Connoquenessing Creek, heading east again. The route runs near homes and industrial areas before coming to a bridge over the P&W Subdivision railroad line, which is owned by CSX and operated by the Buffalo and Pittsburgh Railroad, and the Connoquenessing Creek, at which point it continues into Franklin Township. At this point, PA 588 passes between the Zelienople Municipal Airport to the north and industry to the south. The route enters the borough of Zelienople in Butler County and comes to an intersection with PA 288, at which point PA 588 signage ends. At this point, PA 588 becomes an unsigned highway that follows PA 288 east along West New Castle Street. The road crosses Connoquenessing Creek again and heads into industrial areas, crossing the P&W Subdivision. PA 288/PA 588 continues east through residential areas to its eastern terminus at US 19/PA 68 in the commercial downtown of Zelienople.

== Major intersections ==
County	Location	mi	km	Destinations	Notes
Beaver	Chippewa Township	0.0	0.0	PA 51 (Constitution Boulevard)	Western terminus
Beaver	Beaver Falls	3.1	5.0	PA 18 south (7th Avenue)	West end of PA 18 overlap
Beaver	Beaver Falls	3.3	5.3	PA 18 north (7th Avenue)	East end of PA 18 overlap
Beaver	North Sewickley Township	6.2	10.0	PA 65 (Mercer Road) – Ellwood City, New Brighton	
Butler	Zelienople	14.7	23.7	PA 288 west (West New Castle Street) – Ellwood City	Eastern terminus of PA 588 signage; west end of PA 288 overlap
Butler	Zelienople	16.1	25.9	US 19 / PA 68 (Main Street) to I-79 – Portersville, Pittsburgh	Eastern terminus; east end of PA 288 overlap; eastern terminus of PA 288
1.000 mi = 1.609 km; 1.000 km = 0.621 mi: Concurrency terminus
