= Strand Theater (Zelienople, Pennsylvania) =

Coordinates: 40.7962°N 80.1374°W

The Strand Theater
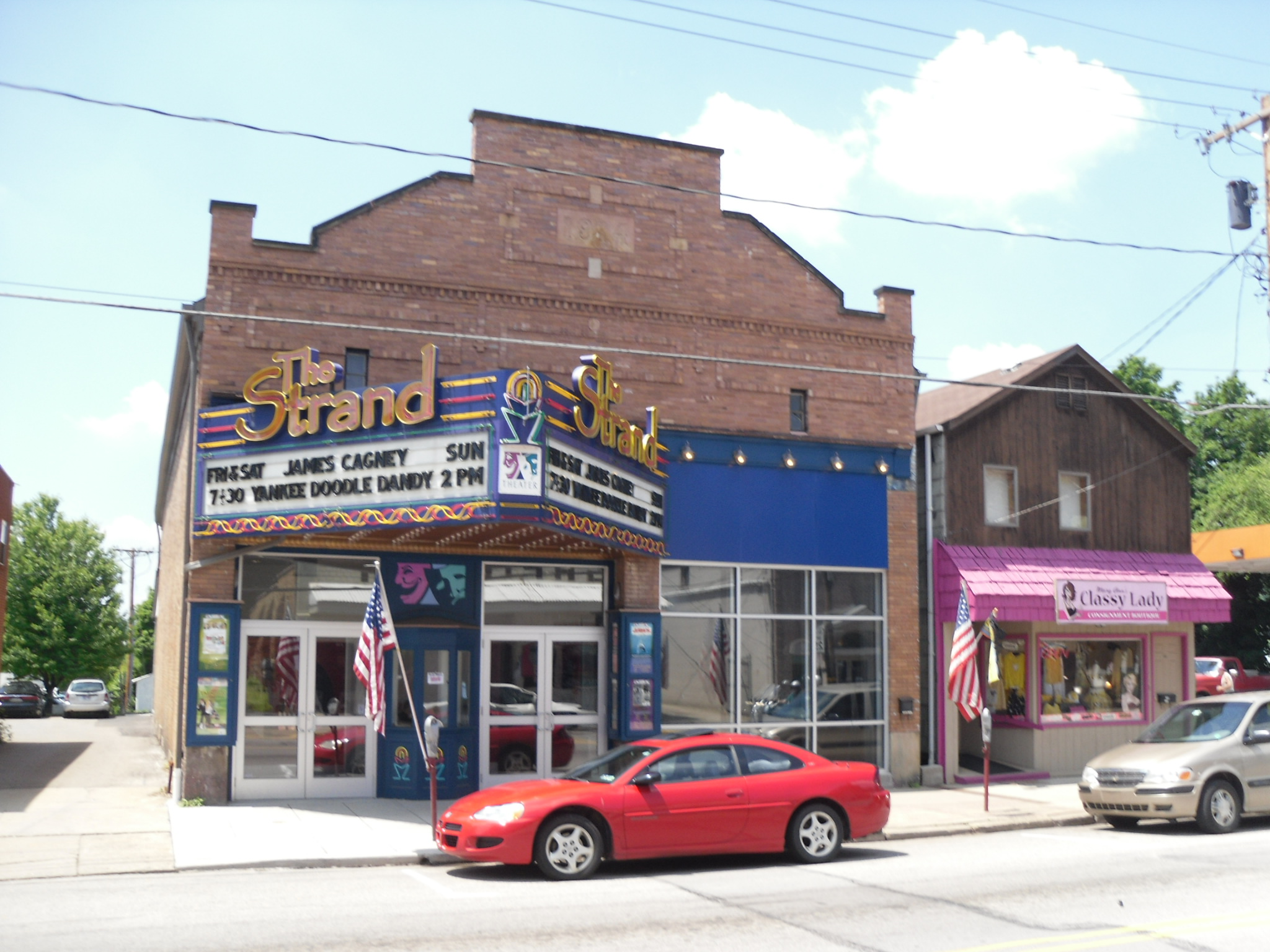
- Interactive map of The Strand Theater
- Address: 119 North Main Street; Zelienople, Pennsylvania; United States
- Owner: The Strand Theater Initiative
- Capacity: 300
- Type: Non-profit Organization
- Current use: Performing Arts, Movie Theater

Construction
- Opened: Oct, 27 1914, reopened 2009
- Closed: about 1986
- Rebuilt: 2008-2009
- Years active: 1914-1986; 2009-Present

Website
- www.thestrandtheater.org

The Strand Theater is a performing arts, film and community center in the borough of Zelienople, Pennsylvania, United States of America.

== History ==
The Strand Theater was constructed and managed by Gioachino and Rosalia Sapienza in 1914 along Main Street (U.S. Route 19) in downtown Zelienople. It is one of the oldest movie theaters in Butler County. The theater was not only used for showing feature films, but was also used as a performing arts center. It featured silent films with live piano accompaniment as well as Vaudeville-style shows on its small stage.

During its long run as a theater, it was owned and/or managed by the Sapienza, Evans, Thomas, and Nalevanko families, all from Zelienople. Local teenage boys and girls were hired as ushers for many years, showing customers to their seats with a flashlight. The price of admission for adults was 10 cents during the 1930s and 50 cents during the 1950s (children under 12 for less).

The Strand closed down in the mid-1980s and sat abandoned for over 20 years. One of the last films shown there was Top Gun with a release date of May 12, 1986. Another was Wildcats with a release date Feb 14, 1986.

In 2001, the Strand Theater Initiative was formed by the residents of Zelienople and surrounding communities in hopes of saving the structure. Over the next four years, the initiative would set up certain activities in the area to help with the fundraising. By 2006, enough funds were collected to start the renovation process.

In the summer of 2007, work began on the interior of the theater, as the floor and seats were removed for the building restoration. A complete rebuilding of the structure began in the spring of 2008 and took nearly a year to complete. The theater reopened in late July 2009, with the first patrons through the doors being Mr. Alan Tomo and his daughter Madeleine.

== Current events ==
The Strand Theater currently shows classic and new movies Friday and Saturday evenings, as well as Sundays during the afternoon. The theater is also available for private rentals.

Special events at the Strand include a new Concert Series, as well as "Northern Nightmares" that takes place during the Halloween season.
