= Merrick Art Gallery =

- U.S. National Register of Historic Places
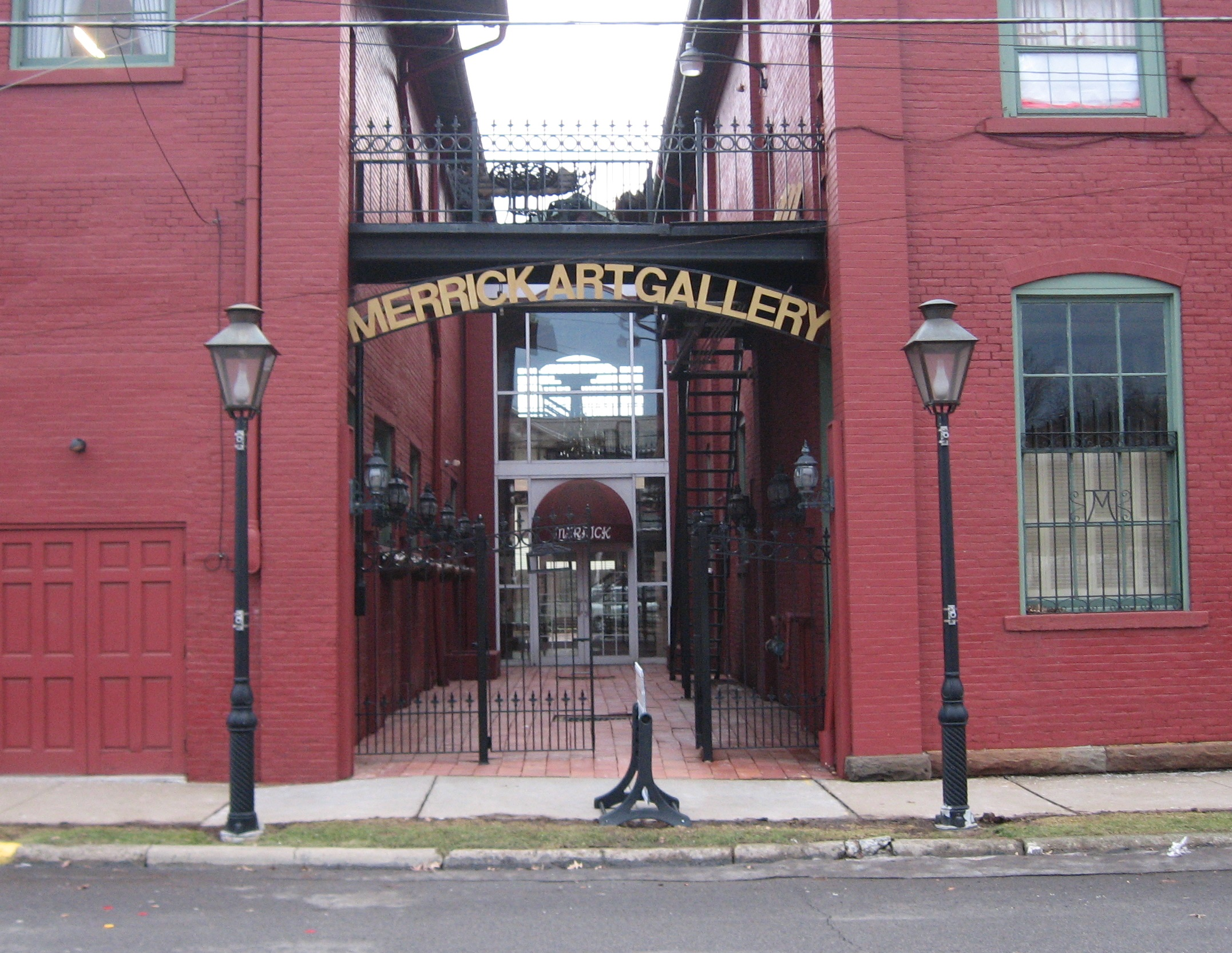
- Entrance

- Location within Pennsylvania Location within the United States
- Location: 5th Ave. and 11th St., New Brighton, Pennsylvania
- Coordinates: 40°43′59″N 80°18′39″W
- Area: 0.4 acres (0.16 ha)
- Built: 1850
- Architectural style: Greek Revival, Late Victorian
- NRHP reference No.: 83002215
- Added to NRHP: August 5, 1983

The Merrick Art Gallery is an early private art museum in western Pennsylvania, founded by industrialist Edward Dempster Merrick in 1880 in the old New Brighton, Pennsylvania railroad station. The gallery, or museum, was expanded to two connected buildings holding 240 works of art, and remains open, free-of-charge, to the public. The gallery was added to the National Register of Historic Places in 1980.

== Museum ==
Edward Dempster Merrick (1832–1911) moved from New York state to New Brighton as a child. He worked as a telegraph operator and in his father's bucket-making business, then joined his brothers in 1867 in a foundry business which they sold in 1885. At this time he made a shrewd investment in a horseshoe nail manufacturing company, which supported Merrick and his museum for the rest of his life.

In 1880, he bought the c. 1850 one-story railroad station, and by 1885 had converted it into a two-story gallery. The second building was added around 1901. His collection of 18th- and 19th-century French, German, English, and American paintings fills the gallery and includes romantic, realistic, and impressionistic art by the artists Pierre-Paul Prud'hon, Gustave Courbet, Hermann Winterhalter, Thomas Sully, and Charles Courtney Curran. The Hudson River School collection includes paintings by Asher Brown Durand, Thomas Moran, John Frederick Kensett, John William Casilear, and William Trost Richards.

The paintings are closely hung in the 19th century tradition. The inclusion of geologic and zoologic exhibits also reflect 19th century practices. Another exhibit is a piano once played by Stephen Foster. Other collections include modern and contemporary art, a 19th-century library and items from the New Brighton Historical Society.

By 1901 Merrick bought 200 paintings, ranging in price from $10 to $485, at a total cost of about $20,000. Merrick himself made 220 paintings which disappeared after his death.
