= Beaver Creek Bridge =

Beaver Creek Bridge may refer to the following bridges in the United States:

- Beaver Creek Bridge (Ogden, Iowa), listed on the NRHP in Iowa
- Beaver Creek Bridge (Perry, Iowa), listed on the NRHP in Iowa
- Beaver Creek Bridge (Schleswig, Iowa), listed on the NRHP in Iowa
- Beaver Creek Native Stone Bridge, listed on the NRHP in Kansas
- Beaver Creek Bridge (Finley, North Dakota), listed on the NRHP in North Dakota
- Beaver Creek Bridge (Hot Springs, South Dakota), listed on the NRHP in South Dakota
- Beaver Creek Bridge (Electra, Texas), listed on the NRHP in Texas

== See also ==
- Beaver Bridge (disambiguation)
- Little Beaver Creek Bridge, Lincoln Highway in Greene County, Iowa, U.S.
