= Baldinger's Market =

Store in the United States

Coordinates: 40.78515°N 80.13436°W

- Type: Public
- Industry: Chocolate and candy seller
- Founded: 1933
- Headquarters: Zelienople, Pennsylvania, USA
- Key people: Allen Baldinger, founder

Baldinger's Market is a small store located along U.S. Route 19 in Butler County, Pennsylvania, United States. The original store was built in 1933 and was located just south of Zelienople, and north of the retail centers in Cranberry Township.

== History and notable features ==
Baldinger's Market is not only well known locally, but also nationally for its penny candy and "Foods from all Nations." Established in 1933 near the corner of U.S. 19 and PA 528, the candy store has been visited by people from all over the United States and throughout the world. The market has also been featured on CBS and several food and travel channels.

In 2008, the store celebrated its 75th anniversary, and was also the last year the original store was open. Plans were made to close down the store in June of that year, but these plans were met with opposition from people in the community who didn't want it to be closed down and demolished.

Baldinger's relocated from its original location to a new site just outside Zelienople. Local businessman Pat Boylan bought the market and re-created an exact replica of the old store—inside and out—in a building at 519 Perry Way, near an Exxon station in Zelienople. The new store opened in the summer of 2008. All of the old cases, coolers, butcher block furniture and shelving were moved to the new site along with the heralded cash register that rings with each turn of the crank.

Baldinger's original location on U.S. Route 19 was demolished on November 17, 2008.
