= Fallston, Pennsylvania =

Borough in Pennsylvania, US

- Borough
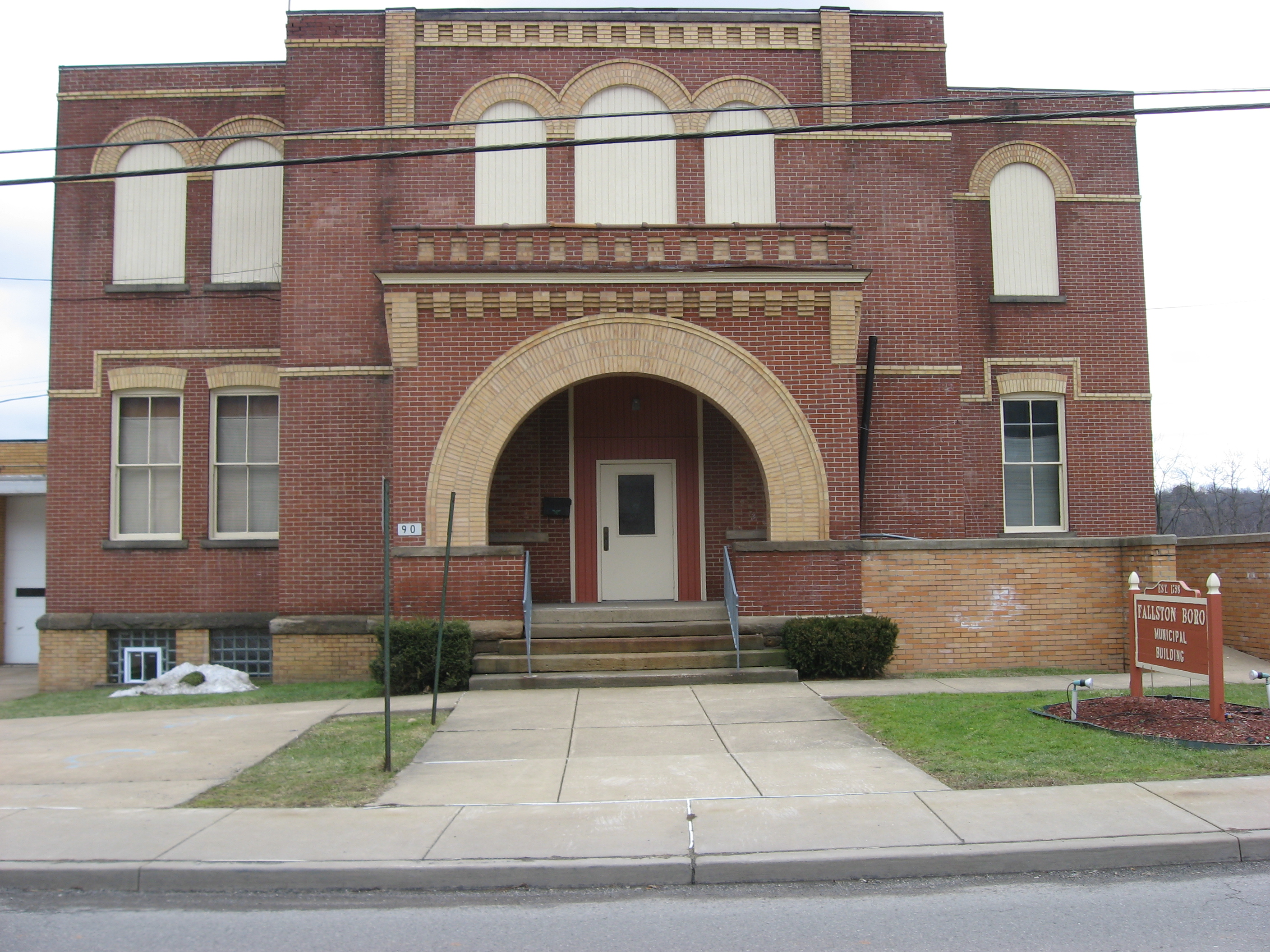
- Fallston's municipal building
- Interactive map of Fallston, Pennsylvania
- Location within Pennsylvania Location within the United States
- Coordinates: 40°43′11″N 80°18′36″W
- Country: United States
- State: Pennsylvania
- County: Beaver
- Settled: 1796
- Incorporated: 1829

Government
  - Type: Borough Council

Area
  - Total: 0.51 sq mi (1.33 km^{2})
  - Land: 0.47 sq mi (1.23 km^{2})
  - Water: 0.039 sq mi (0.10 km^{2})
- Elevation: 722 ft (220 m)

Population (2020)
  - Total: 259
  - Density: 546.4/sq mi (210.95/km^{2})
- Time zone: UTC-5 (Eastern (EST))
  - Summer (DST): UTC-4 (EDT)
- Area code: 724
- FIPS code: 42-25152
- Website: http://fallstonborough.org/

Fallston is a borough in Beaver County, Pennsylvania, United States, along the Beaver River. The population was 259 at the 2020 census. It is a part of the Pittsburgh metropolitan area.

== History ==
Fallston takes its name from a waterfall in the Beaver River. It lies on the west side of the Beaver River immediately opposite New Brighton, Pennsylvania and about a mile below Beaver Falls. The narrow space between the hills on either side and the Beaver River was dammed at the lower falls; the water power allowed Fallston to achieve great importance as a manufacturing center. The Harris's Pittsburgh Business Directory for the year 1837 states "This place and the surrounding neighborhood, bids fair to be extensively increased, in consequence of the immense mineral and water advantages which it possesses."

The borough of Fallston, the largest manufacturing center of its time in Beaver County, was incorporated by an Act of the Assembly in 1829. A post office at Fallston was established June 25, 1829.

On August 5, 1835, the Fallston and Brighton Gazette newspaper started publication in Fallston, one of the earliest newspapers in the county. It was not able to sustain itself, and ceased publication in November 1836. The Beaver Falls Union and Beaver County Advocate was the Gazette's successor, starting publication in January 1838; when it published its last on March 2, 1839, the Western Argus, which started publication in 1818 elsewhere in Beaver County, attempted and was mainly successful in taking over the Advocate's readership. It continued publication for more than 86 years (with various changes in name and management over the years).

In 1836, brothers Matthew T. Kennedy (1804–1884) and Samuel Kennedy (1810–1886), sons of Thomas Kennedy (1782–1821), an Irish-born wheel and spinning-wheel maker, went into business building cabinets and doing wheelwright work carried on by water power. The business later changed into a nail keg, and later into a lead keg factory. Their business was successful and in 1876, the Kennedy brothers established a second plant in New Brighton, Pennsylvania. The business was carried on by the founders' descendants until the 1930s.

On October 1, 1836, a contract for building a covered wooden bridge over the Beaver River at Fallston was awarded to Lathrop & LeBarron. The bridge opened in 1837, and was heavily traveled. Once the bridge was opened, nearly all the manufacturing was done on the Fallston side, with most of the owners of the concerns living on the opposite side of the Beaver in New Brighton. The covered bridge stood in place until February 6, 1884, when flooding on the Ohio and Beaver rivers inflicted extensive damage in low-lying areas and swept it away. In its place is the Fallston Bridge, a fine iron bridge which replaced the lost covered bridge and was still in use until February 2015.

== Geography ==
Fallston is located at 40°43′11″N 80°18′36″W (40.719732, −80.310006).

According to the United States Census Bureau, the borough has a total area of 0.5 square miles (1.3 km^{2}), of which 0.4 square miles (1.0 km^{2}) is land and 0.04 square miles (0.10 km^{2}) (8.00%) is water.

=== Surrounding and adjacent neighborhoods ===
Fallston has three land borders, with Patterson Township to the northwest, Bridgewater to the south and southeast, and Brighton Township to the west. Across the Beaver River, the borough runs adjacent with New Brighton (with a direct connection via Veteran's Bridge) and Rochester Township.

== Demographics ==
Historical population
Census	Pop.	Note	%±
1850	571		—
1860	577		1.1%
1870	629		9.0%
1880	560		−11.0%
1890	541		−3.4%
1900	549		1.5%
1910	555		1.1%
1920	470		−15.3%
1930	605		28.7%
1940	628		3.8%
1950	511		−18.6%
1960	410		−19.8%
1970	571		39.3%
1980	312		−45.4%
1990	392		25.6%
2000	307		−21.7%
2010	266		−13.4%
2020	259		−2.6%
2021 (est.)	252	▼	−2.7%

As of the 2000 census, there were 307 people, 126 households, and 86 families residing in the borough. The population density was 678.7 inhabitants per square mile (262.0/km^{2}). There were 136 housing units at an average density of 300.7 per square mile (116.1/km^{2}). The racial makeup of the borough was 93.49% White, 5.54% African American, and 0.98% from two or more races.

There were 126 households, out of which 30.2% had children under the age of 18 living with them, 55.6% were married couples living together, 7.9% had a female householder with no husband present, and 31.0% were non-families. 24.6% of all households were made up of individuals, and 16.7% had someone living alone who was 65 years of age or older. The average household size was 2.44 and the average family size was 2.93.

In the borough the population was spread out, with 22.8% under the age of 18, 6.8% from 18 to 24, 25.1% from 25 to 44, 25.4% from 45 to 64, and 19.9% who were 65 years of age or older. The median age was 42 years. For every 100 females, there were 98.1 males. For every 100 females age 18 and over, there were 86.6 males.

The median income for a household in the borough was $30,000, and the median income for a family was $42,917. Males had a median income of $30,714 versus $25,625 for females. The per capita income for the borough was $15,312. About 6.8% of families and 11.8% of the population were below the poverty line, including 15.1% of those under the age of 18 and 4.5% of those 65 or over.

== Education ==
Children in Fallston are served by the New Brighton Area School District. The current schools serving Fallston are:

- New Brighton Elementary School – grades K–5
- New Brighton Middle School – grades 6–8
- New Brighton High School – grades 9–12
