= Pennsylvania Route 288 =

State highway in Pennsylvania, US

Pennsylvania Route 288

Route information
- Maintained by PennDOT
- Length: 15.4 mi (24.8 km)

Major junctions
- West end: PA 18 in Wampum
- PA 65 in Ellwood City
- East end: US 19 / PA 68 / PA 588 in Zelienople

Location
- Country: United States
- State: Pennsylvania
- Counties: Lawrence, Beaver, Butler

Highway system
- Pennsylvania State Route System; Interstate; US; State; Scenic; Legislative
| ← PA 287 | → PA 290 |

Pennsylvania Route 288 (PA 288) or State Route 288 is an east–west route in western Pennsylvania, United States. The highway is 15.4 miles (24 km) long and runs from PA 18 in Wampum east to the US 19/PA 68 concurrency in Zelienople.

== Route description ==
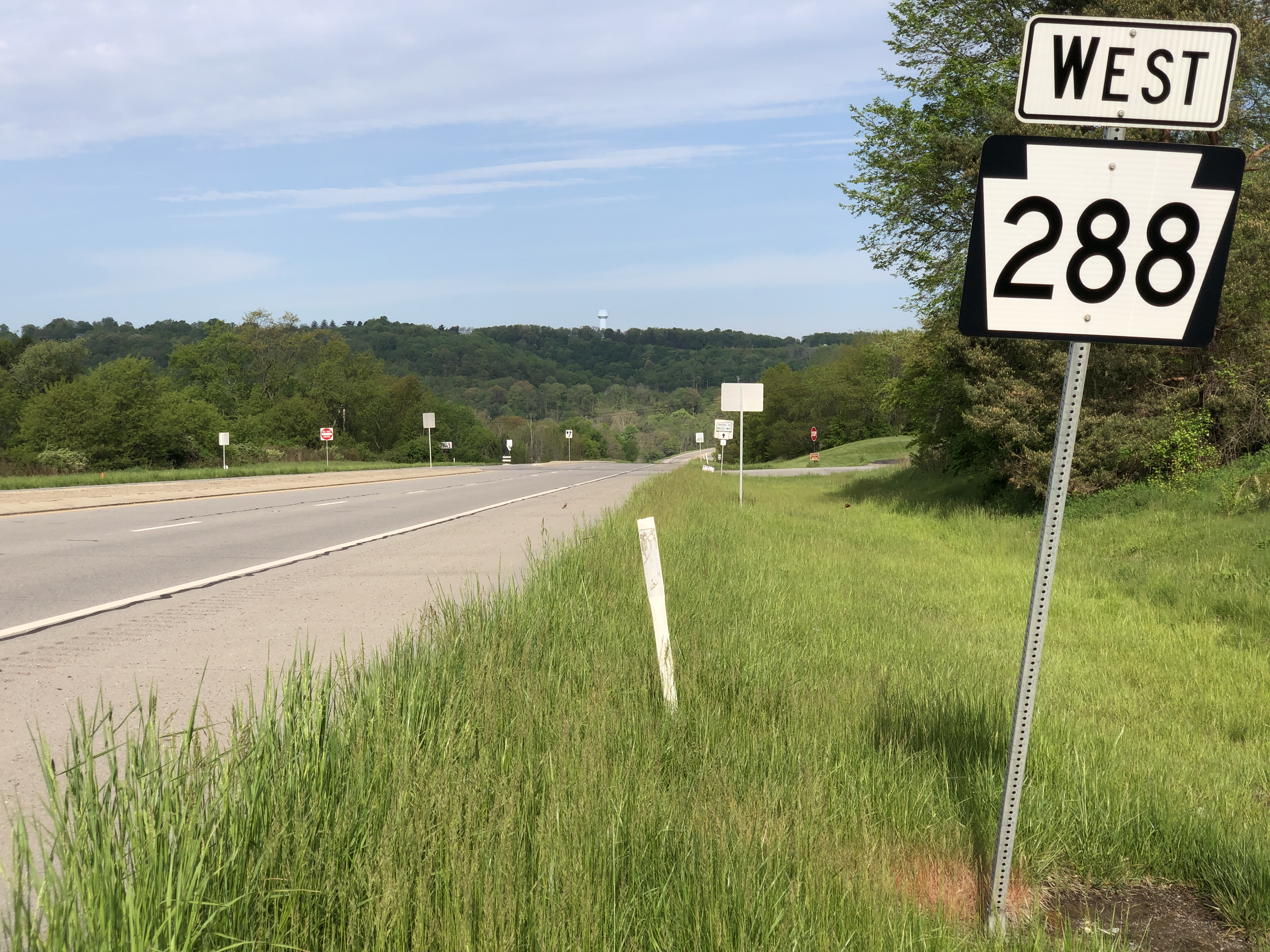
PA 288 westbound in Franklin Township

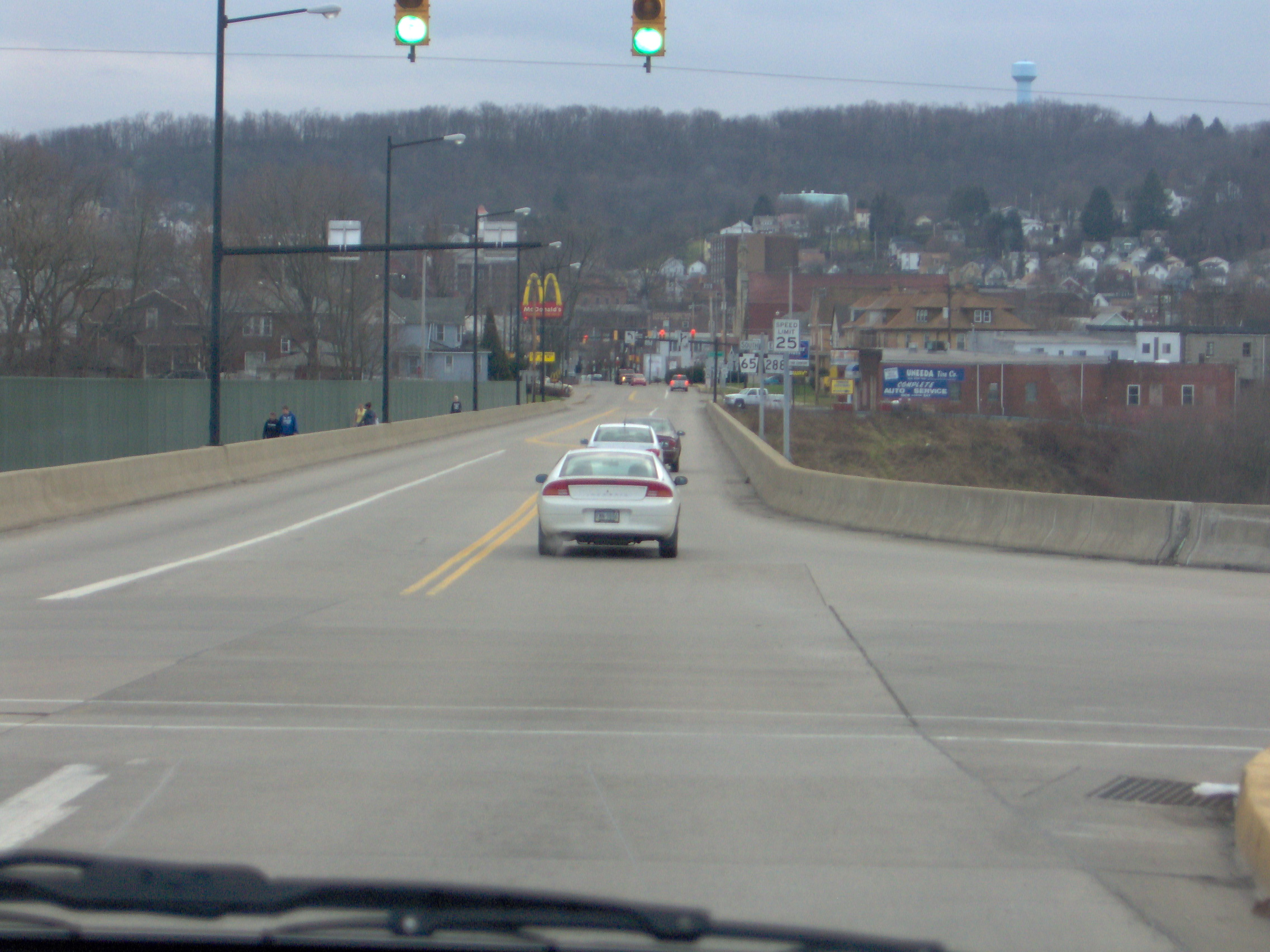
PA 288 heading eastbound along with PA 65 southbound across the Connoquenessing Creek

PA 288 begins at an intersection with PA 18 in the borough of Wampum, Lawrence County, heading north on two-lane undivided Main Street. The road passes through wooded areas and turns northwest, crossing under Norfolk Southern's Koppel Secondary railroad line before running to the west of CSX's Pittsburgh Subdivision railroad line and passing under Norfolk Southern's Youngstown Line. The route heads into residential areas and turns northeast onto Wampum Road, passing over the CSX line before crossing the Beaver River into Wayne Township. PA 288 passes through woods before curving southeast and running through the residential community of Chewton, running to the southwest of the P&W Subdivision railroad line, which is owned by CSX and operated by the Buffalo and Pittsburgh Railroad, before passing over it. The road continues between farmland to the northeast and woods, along with the P&W Subdivision, the Youngstown Line, and the Beaver River, to the southwest.

The route curves south into forested areas, turning east to head away from the river and railroad lines and pass through the residential community of Rock Point. PA 288 runs between homes to the north and woods to the south, heading into the borough of Ellwood City. Here, the route comes to an intersection with PA 65 and turns south to form a concurrency with that route on 5th Street, crossing the Connoquenessing Creek. The two routes head into residential and commercial areas, turning east onto Fountain Avenue. PA 65/PA 288 turns south onto 2nd Street, with PA 488 continuing east on Fountain Avenue. The road heads south through residential areas, passing over the P&W Subdivision line as a two-lane divided highway before becoming undivided again intersecting the eastern terminus of PA 351. Following this, the two routes head into industrial areas.

PA 65/PA 288 continues into Beaver County, passing through more industrial sections of Ellwood City before running through urban residential areas and widening into a four-lane divided highway. At this point, the road passes near more homes separated from the road by trees, heading into North Sewickley Township and becoming Ellwood-Zelienople Road. The two routes turn to the east and cross the Connoquenessing Creek again into Franklin Township before PA 65 splits from PA 288 by turning south. The route continues east, passing under the P&W Subdivision and heading near more homes. The road passes a few businesses and narrows back into a two-lane undivided road, heading into wooded areas with a few residences. PA 288 continues into a mix of farmland and woodland with some homes, passing through Lillyville and turning to the southeast. The road becomes Zelienople Road and heads through more open agricultural areas with occasional woods and homes before heading south of Hereford Manor Lake. The route turns south through more wooded and agricultural areas, passing to the east of Zelienople Municipal Airport before making a turn to the southeast.

PA 288 enters the borough of Zelienople in Butler County and becomes West New Castle Street, passing homes to the north and fields to the south as it comes to an intersection with PA 588. At this point, PA 588 joins the route for the remainder of its length, however it is unsigned along PA 288. The road crosses Connoquenessing Creek again and heads into industrial areas, crossing a Buffalo and Pittsburgh Railroad line. PA 288 continues east through residential areas to its eastern terminus at US 19/PA 68 in the commercial downtown of Zelienople.

== Major intersections ==
| County | Location | mi | km | Destinations | Notes |
|---|---|---|---|---|---|
| Lawrence | Wampum | 0.0 | 0.0 | PA 18 – Beaver Falls, New Castle | Western terminus |
| Lawrence | Ellwood City | 4.7 | 7.6 | PA 65 north (North Street) – New Castle | West end of PA 65 overlap |
| Lawrence | Ellwood City | 5.2 | 8.4 | PA 488 east (Fountain Avenue) | Western terminus of PA 488 |
| Lawrence | Ellwood City | 5.5 | 8.9 | PA 351 west (Crescent Avenue) | Eastern terminus of PA 351 |
| Beaver | Ellwood City | 6.4 | 10.3 | PA 65 south (65th Infantry Division Memorial Highway) – New Brighton | East end of PA 65 overlap |
| Butler | Zelienople | 14.5 | 23.3 | PA 588 west – Beaver Falls | West end of unsigned PA 588 overlap |
| Butler | Zelienople | 15.4 | 24.8 | US 19 / PA 68 (Main Street) to I-79 – Portersville, Pittsburgh | Eastern terminus; east end of unsigned PA 588 overlap; eastern terminus of PA 588 |
1.000 mi = 1.609 km; 1.000 km = 0.621 mi: Concurrency terminus
