= Zelienople, Pennsylvania =

- Borough
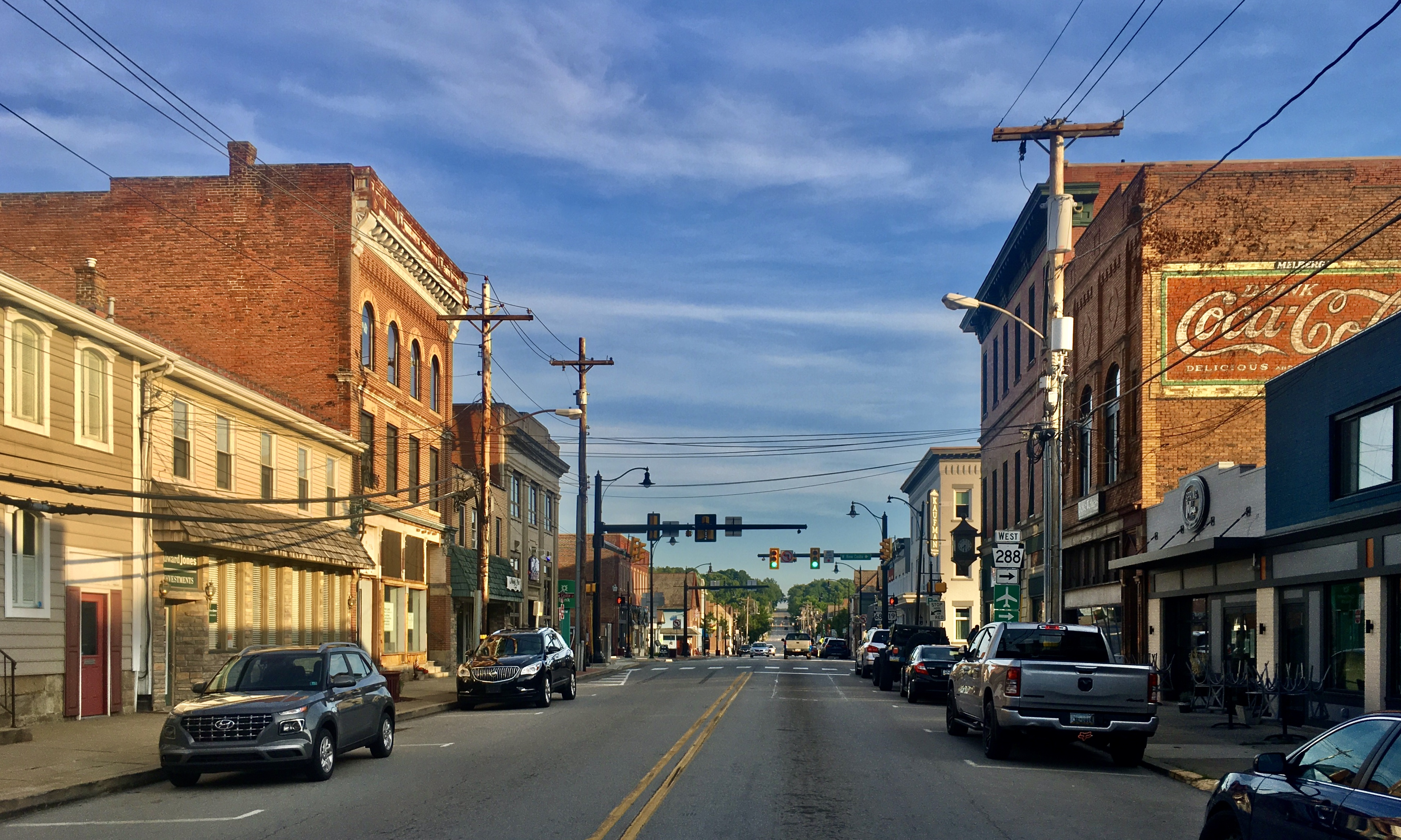
- Downtown Zelienople

- Flag Logo
- Nickname: Zelie
- Motto: A Modern Place with Old Fashioned Grace
- Location of Zelienople in Butler County, Pennsylvania

- Location in Pennsylvania Location in the United States
- Coordinates: 40°47′31″N 80°8′28″W
- Country: United States
- State: Pennsylvania
- County: Butler County
- Settled: 1802
- Incorporated: 1840

Government
  - Mayor: Thomas M. Oliverio

Area
  - Total: 2.10 sq mi (5.44 km^{2})
  - Land: 2.05 sq mi (5.32 km^{2})
  - Water: 0.046 sq mi (0.12 km^{2})

Population (2020)
  - Total: 3,912
  - Density: 1,755.1/sq mi (677.65/km^{2})
- Time zone: UTC-5 (EST)
  - Summer (DST): UTC-4 (EDT)
- ZIP code: 16063
- Area code: 724
- FIPS code: 42-87272
- School district: Seneca Valley School District
- Website: zelieboro.org

Pennsylvania Historical Marker
- Designated: October 3, 1947

Zelienople (/ˌziːliːəˈnoʊpəl/) is a borough in western Butler County, Pennsylvania, United States. The population was 3,912 at the 2020 census. Located 28 miles (45 km) north of Pittsburgh, it is part of the Pittsburgh metropolitan area.

== History ==
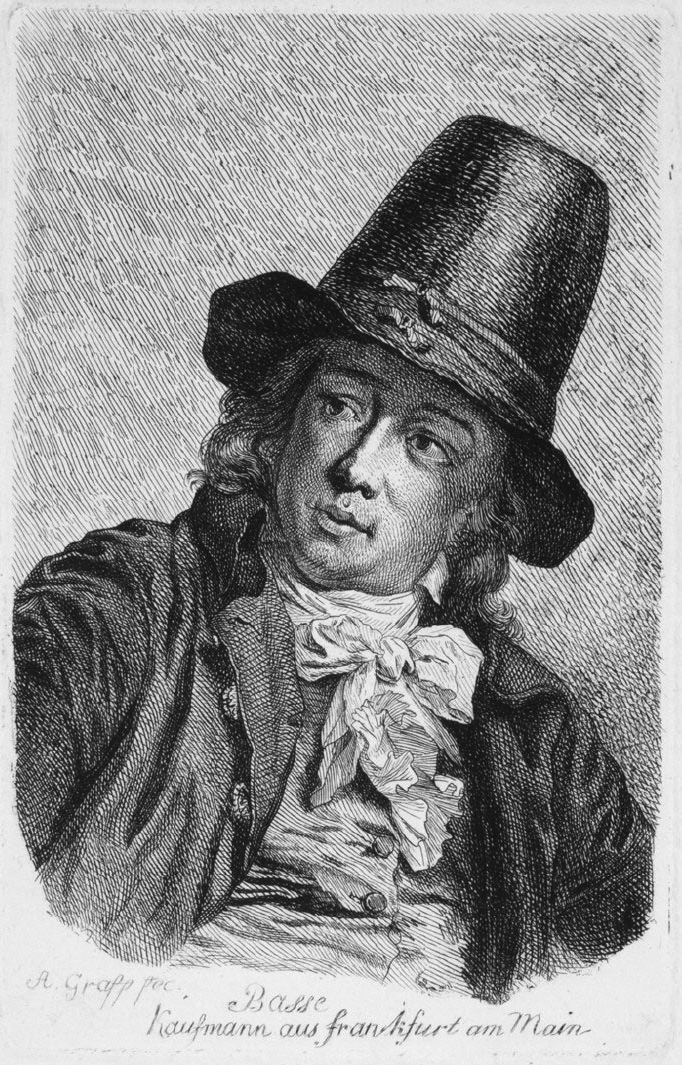
Dettmar Basse (Anton Graff, c. 1792)

Zelienople was named for the eldest daughter of Baron Dettmar Basse (1762–1836), whose chosen name was Zelie (her given name was Fredericka) which she named herself after her favorite doll. Baron Basse arrived in 1802 from Frankfurt am Main, Germany, and purchased a tract of 10,000 acres (40 km^{2}) of land in Butler and Beaver counties.

He proceeded to lay out a village and build his residence, a three-story castle complete with towers, turrets and battlements, named "The Bassenheim." At the time, Zelie was betrothed to Philip Louis Passavant and was still in Germany. Extensive preparations were made by Basse to establish the new home and town in America and prepare it for his daughter's arrival in September 1807.

Basse sold 5,000 acres (20 km^{2}) of his land to George Rapp, a Bavarian pietist religious leader who founded the bourgh of Harmony. Basse came to be known as "Dr. Muller". Whether the title of "doctor" was given to him through a knowledge of medicine or conferred upon him as a degree is unknown. He was regarded as an intelligent man and during the Napoleonic era represented Frankfurt as an ambassador to Paris. Basse returned to Germany in 1818, leaving his business to his son-in-law, Philip Passavant.

Passavant opened the first store in Zelienople in 1807 and managed it for 41 years, until he gave it to his son, C. S. Passavant. By 1826, there were 50 houses in Zelienople and three churches. The population in 1870 was 387, and in 1890 it had grown to 639. In 1879 a railroad was built through town, substantially increasing the growth and commerce. In 1880, the American Union Telegraph Company established an office in Zelienople. The Federalists appointed Andrew McClure, a local tavern-keeper, as the first postmaster of Zelienople in the first decade of 1800. Christian Buhl was named the first justice of the peace in 1840.

Early Zelienople commerce supported the local agriculture community, as there was no viable means of transportation. In 1840 Zelienople was incorporated as a borough. There has been a volunteer fire department since about 1850. A full-time Borough Manager was hired in 1994.

Zelienople is home to the historic Buhl House, Passavant House, Kaufman Tavern, Strand Theater, and Eichholtz Building: The Eichholtz family played a historical and transformational role in Zelienople. Zelienople was linked to Ellwood City, Evans City and Pittsburgh in 1908 by the Pittsburgh, Harmony, Butler and New Castle Railway, an interurban trolley line. The line closed on June 15, 1931, and the trolleys were replaced by buses.

== Geography ==
Zelienople is located in southwestern Butler County, situated on the south bank of Connoquenessing Creek, in an area that is rich with coal and iron ore. The elevation is 935 feet (285 m) above sea level. The borough is bordered by Jackson Township on the north, southeast, and south, and by the borough of Harmony on the northeast. The western border of Zelienople is the Beaver County line.

U.S. Route 19 (Perry Highway) is the main north–south road through the center of town. Interstate 79, running generally parallel to US 19, passes just to the east of the borough, with access from Exits 85, 87, and 88. Via I-79 and I-279 it is 28 miles (45 km) south to downtown Pittsburgh. To the north I-79 leads 100 miles (160 km) to Erie. Pennsylvania Route 68 runs east from US 19 as East Grandview Avenue and southwest as West Beaver Street. Via PA 68 it is 17 miles (27 km) east to Butler, the county seat, and 12 miles (19 km) southwest to Rochester on the Ohio River. Routes 288 and 588 lead west from town on West New Castle Street, PA 288 turning northwest to lead 10 miles (16 km) to Ellwood City, and PA 588 leading 14 miles (23 km) west to Beaver Falls.

According to the United States Census Bureau, the borough has a total area of 2.1 square miles (5.4 km^{2}), of which 0.04 square miles (0.1 km^{2}), or 2.20%, is water.

== Demographics ==
Historical population
| Census | Pop. | Note | %± |
|---|---|---|---|
| 1850 | 385 | | — |
| 1860 | 378 | | −1.8% |
| 1870 | 387 | | 2.4% |
| 1880 | 497 | | 28.4% |
| 1890 | 639 | | 28.6% |
| 1900 | 963 | | 50.7% |
| 1910 | 1,388 | | 44.1% |
| 1920 | 1,870 | | 34.7% |
| 1930 | 1,933 | | 3.4% |
| 1940 | 2,117 | | 9.5% |
| 1950 | 2,981 | | 40.8% |
| 1960 | 3,284 | | 10.2% |
| 1970 | 3,602 | | 9.7% |
| 1980 | 3,502 | | −2.8% |
| 1990 | 4,158 | | 18.7% |
| 2000 | 4,123 | | −0.8% |
| 2010 | 3,812 | | −7.5% |
| 2020 | 3,912 | | 2.6% |

As of the 2020 census, Zelienople has a population of 3,912. The median age is 49.5 years. 16.1% of residents are under age 18, and 28.8% of residents are 65 or older. For every 100 females there are 84.8 males, and for every 100 females age 18 and over there are 81.3 males age 18 and over. 99.7% of residents live in urban areas, while 0.3% live in rural areas.

There are 1,956 households in Zelienople, of which 17.7% have children under age 18 living in them. Of all households, 38.9% are married-couple households, 20.9% are households with a male householder and no spouse or partner present, and 35.1% are households with a female householder and no spouse or partner present. About 45.6% of all households are made up of individuals and 24.1% had someone living alone who is 65 or older. There are 2,105 housing units, of which 7.1% are vacant. The homeowner vacancy rate is 0.4%, and the rental vacancy rate is 7.8%.

According to the 2000 United States census, the racial makeup of the borough was 97.91% White, 0.39% African American, 0.07% Native American, 0.65% Asian, 0.17% from other races, and 0.80% from two or more races. Hispanic or Latino of any race were 0.32% of the population. The median income for a household in the borough was $40,250, and the median income for a family was $52,426. The per capita income for the borough was $23,555. About 0.2% of families and 0.7% of the population were below the poverty line, including 0.4% of those under age 18 and 0.3% of those age 65 or over.

Racial composition as of the 2020 census
| Race | Number | Percent |
|---|---|---|
| White | 3,708 | 94.8% |
| Black or African American | 23 | 0.6% |
| American Indian and Alaska Native | 2 | 0.1% |
| Asian | 23 | 0.6% |
| Native Hawaiian and Other Pacific Islander | 1 | 0.0% |
| Some other race | 18 | 0.5% |
| Two or more races | 137 | 3.5% |
| Hispanic or Latino (of any race) | 80 | 2.0% |

== Education ==
It is in the Seneca Valley School District.

== Arts and culture ==
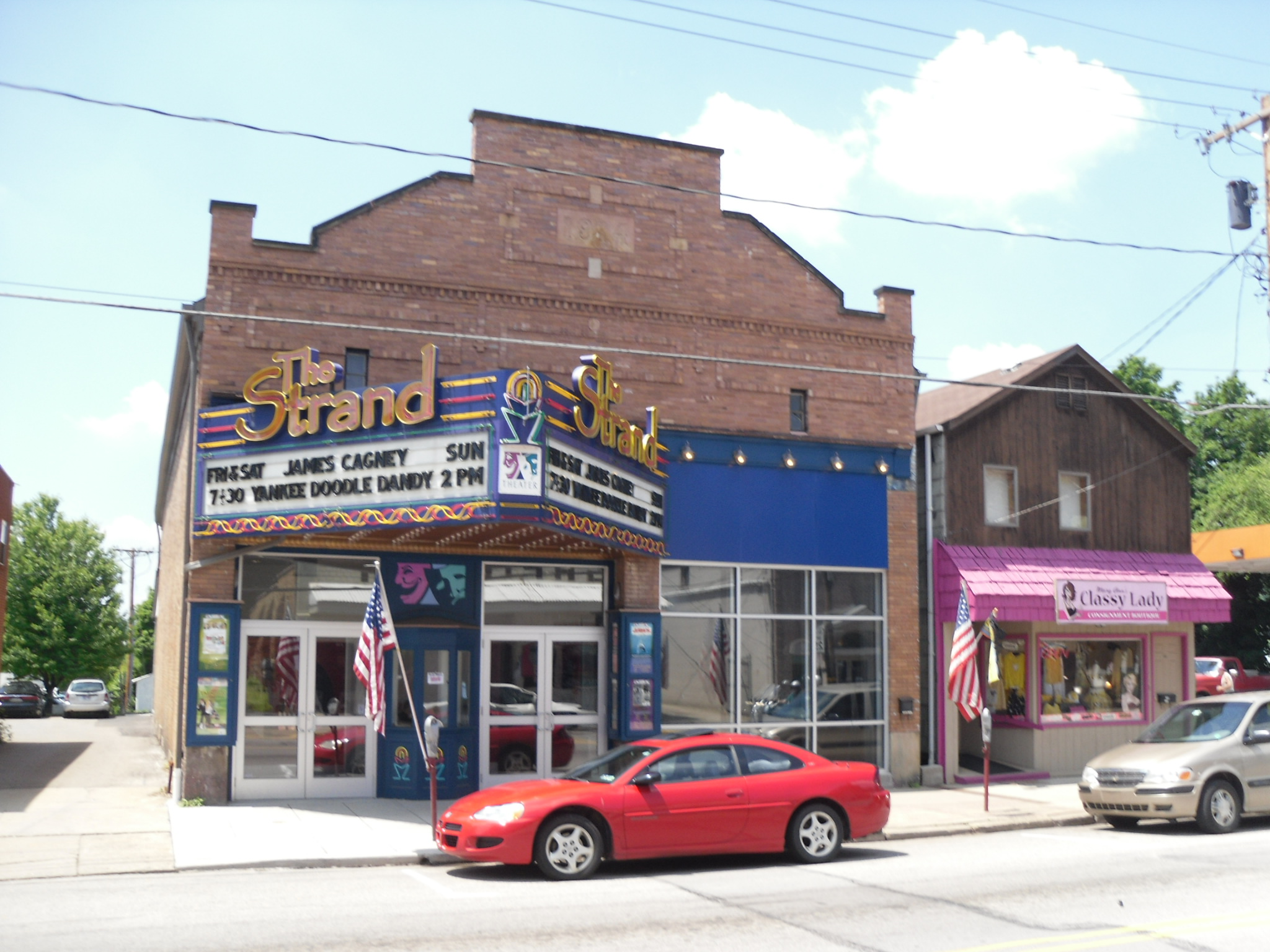
Strand Theater

The Strand Theater is a performing arts center on Main Street that has been restored and hosts concerts and films for the borough and surrounding area. Every year, Zelienople hosts a Fourth of July parade through downtown. For the past 44 years, one of the major annual events is the town's summer Horse Trading Days Arts and Music Festival.

== See also ==
- Baldinger's Market
