= Beaver Dam Bridge =

Beaver Dam Bridge Pont Beaver Dam
- Coordinates: 48°51′55″N 65°05′17″W
- Crossed: York River, Quebec
- Locale: Gaspe Peninsula

Characteristics
- Material: Concrete
- No. of lanes: 2

History
- Collapsed: May 22, 1963

Location
- Interactive map of Beaver Dam Bridge

The Beaver Dam Bridge (French: Pont Beaver Dam) was a bridge along the York River in Quebec, Canada. The bridge was situated on Quebec Route 198 and connected the Quebecois municipalities of Murdochville and Gaspé. The bridge collapsed on May 22, 1963, due to flood damage and killed 6 people, all mine workers heading toward Murdochville.

== Tragedy ==
Early in the morning on 22 May 1963, a pillar of the Beaver Dam Bridge was knocked down and swept away by flood waters. Six cars whose drivers were not aware of the pillar collapse plunged into the York River, banging hard on the bridge's concrete in the process, and killing the occupants.

The car of one of the tragedy's victims, Melrose Miller

One car containing four people plunged into the river and floated 800 meters before the occupants could escape and warn incoming traffic, preventing further deaths.
