= Beaver River Railroad Bridge =

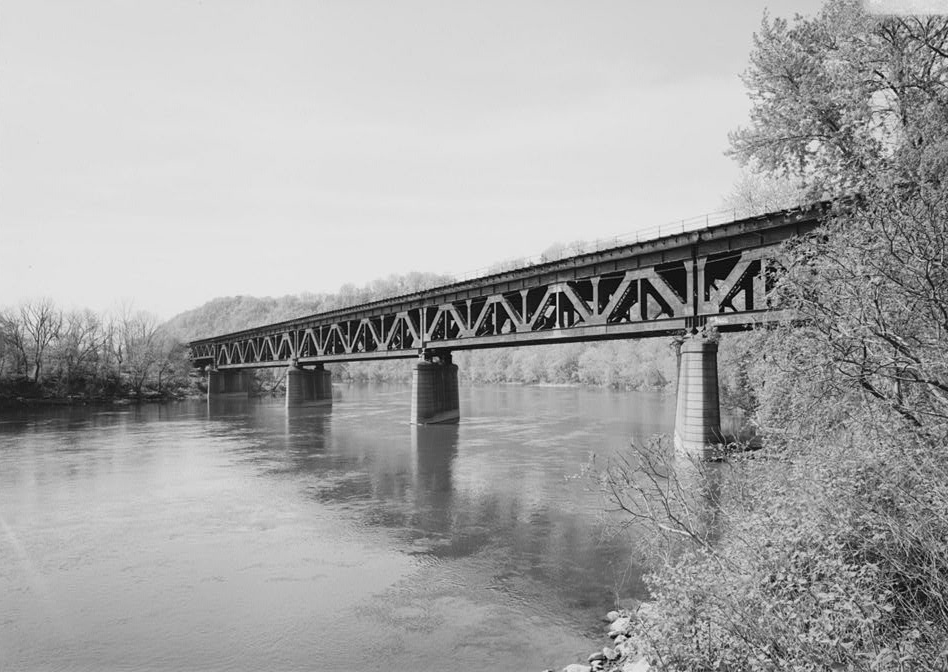
- The Beaver River Bridge in 1999.
- Coordinates: 40°44′23″N 80°19′10″W
- Crosses: Beaver River
- Locale: New Brighton, Pennsylvania

Characteristics
- Design: Steel truss bridge
- Total length: 1,221 feet (372 m)
- Longest span: 219 feet (67 m)

History
- Opened: 1926

The Beaver River Railroad Bridge crosses the Beaver River in New Brighton, Pennsylvania, carrying the tracks of the Fort Wayne Line. It was built in 1926, to a design by J.F. Leonard, the Pennsylvania Railroad's engineer in charge of bridges and buildings, for the Pittsburgh, Fort Wayne and Chicago Railway. The riveted Warren deck truss main span and riveted deck girder western side spans have a total length of 1,221 feet (372 m). The deck truss spans vary from 122 feet (37 m) to 219 feet (67 m), some of which are unusually shallow and skewed. It replaced an 1887 span, which was converted to road use, continuing in that role until it was replaced in 1985.

== See also ==
- List of bridges documented by the Historic American Engineering Record in Pennsylvania
