= Eastvale, Pennsylvania =

Borough in Pennsylvania, United States

- Borough
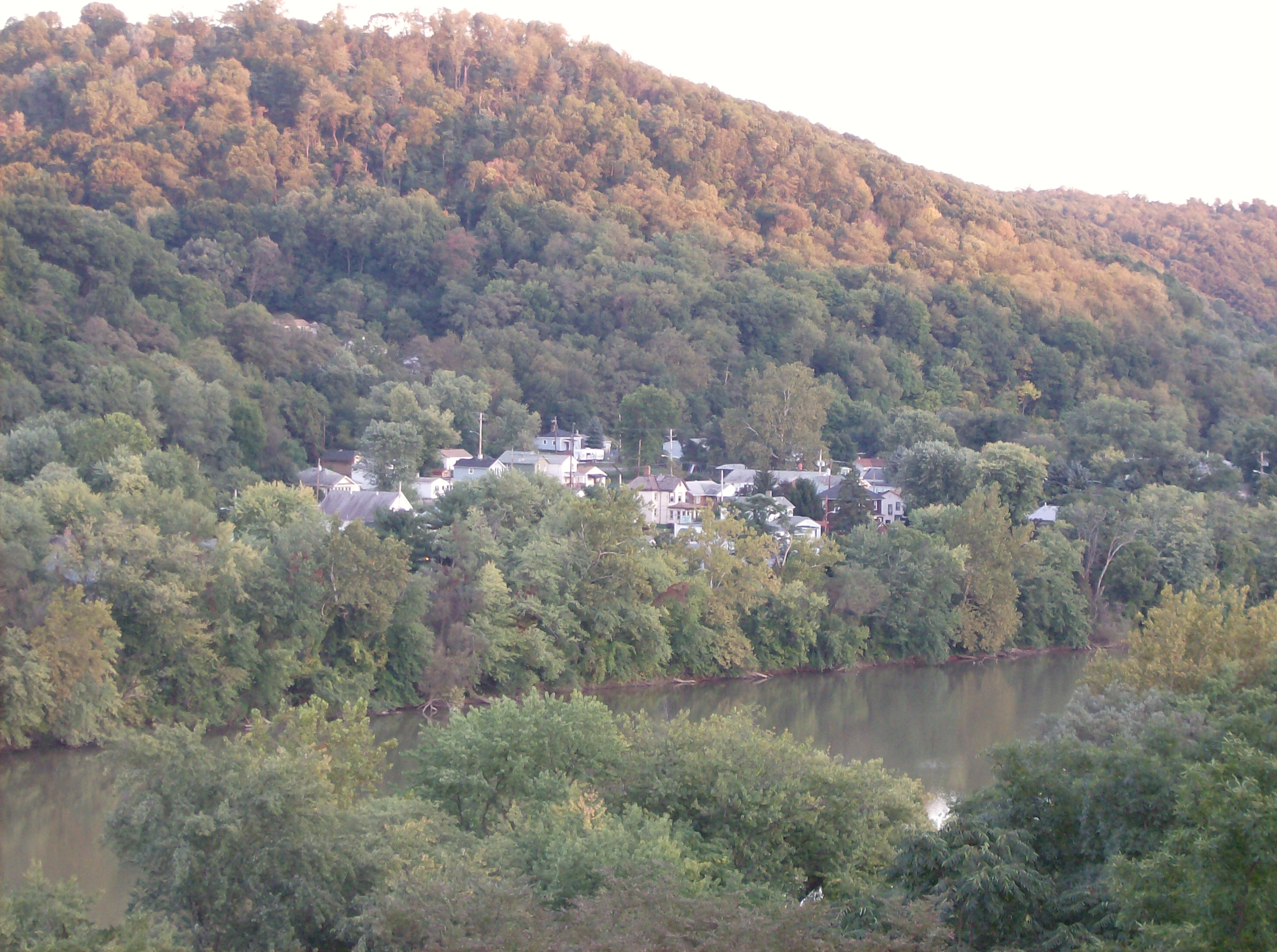
- View of Eastvale taken from across the Beaver River
- Interactive map of Eastvale, Pennsylvania
- Location within Pennsylvania Location within the United States
- Coordinates: 40°46′4″N 80°18′52″W
- Country: United States
- State: Pennsylvania
- County: Beaver
- Incorporated: 1892

Government
  - Type: Borough Council

Area
  - Total: 0.12 sq mi (0.30 km^{2})
  - Land: 0.089 sq mi (0.23 km^{2})
  - Water: 0.027 sq mi (0.07 km^{2})
- Elevation: 1,063 ft (324 m)

Population (2020)
  - Total: 184
  - Density: 2,034.4/sq mi (785.47/km^{2})
- Time zone: UTC-5 (Eastern (EST))
  - Summer (DST): UTC-4 (EDT)
- Area code: 724
- FIPS code: 42-21968

Eastvale is a borough in Beaver County, Pennsylvania, United States, along the Beaver River. The population was 183 at the 2020 census. It is part of the Pittsburgh metropolitan area.

== History ==
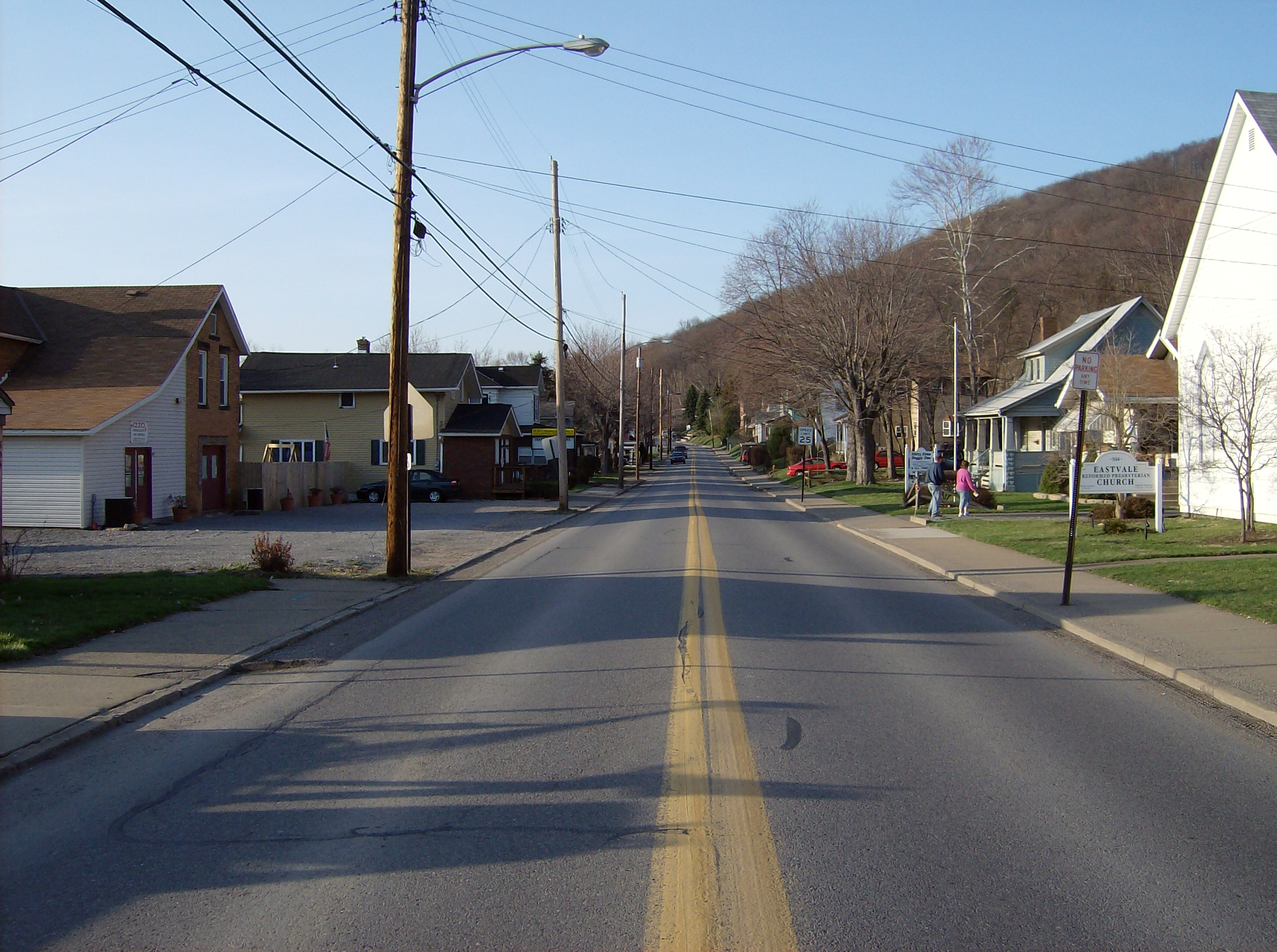
View along Second Avenue

Originally known as "Fetterman", Eastvale was incorporated from parts of North Sewickley and Pulaski townships on July 1, 1892. The population was 256 at the 1900 census, the first taken since incorporation. A post office was operated in the community from 1897 to 1901, since which time Eastvale addresses have been served by the Beaver Falls post office. The first bridge between Eastvale and Beaver Falls was completed in the 1880s and replaced by the current Eastvale Bridge in 1962. Eastvale's economy was long dependent on a brickworks at the borough's southern end, which closed by the mid-1970s.

== Geography ==
Eastvale is located at 40°46′4″N 80°18′52″W (40.767765, −80.314579), across the Beaver River from the city of Beaver Falls.

According to the United States Census Bureau, the borough has a total area of 0.1 square miles (0.26 km^{2}), of which 0.1 square miles (0.26 km^{2}) is land and 0.04 square miles (0.10 km^{2}) (33.33%) is water. Eastvale consists primarily of a strip of land along the Beaver River, far longer than it is wide. By area, it is the smallest municipality in Beaver County.

=== Surrounding and adjacent neighborhoods ===
Eastvale has two land borders, including North Sewickley Township to the northeast and Daugherty Township to the southeast. Across the Beaver River to the west, Eastvale runs adjacent with Beaver Falls and has a direct connection via Eastvale Bridge, which is also part of the borough's main road of Pennsylvania Route 588

== Demographics ==
Historical population
Census	Pop.	Note	%±
1900	256		—
1910	322		25.8%
1920	429		33.2%
1930	601		40.1%
1940	573		−4.7%
1950	533		−7.0%
1960	513		−3.8%
1970	453		−11.7%
1980	379		−16.3%
1990	328		−13.5%
2000	293		−10.7%
2010	225		−23.2%
2020	184		−18.2%
2021 (est.)	180	▼	−2.2%

As of the 2000 census, there were 293 people, 125 households, and 81 families residing in the borough. The population density was 3,424.8 inhabitants per square mile (1,322.3/km^{2}). There were 133 housing units at an average density of 1,554.6 per square mile (600.2/km^{2}). The racial makeup of the borough was 96.93% White, 1.71% African American, and 1.37% from other races.

There were 125 households, out of which 24.0% had children under the age of 18 living with them, 44.8% were married couples living together, 15.2% had a female householder with no husband present, and 34.4% were non-families. 31.2% of all households were made up of individuals, and 10.4% had someone living alone who was 65 years of age or older. The average household size was 2.34 and the average family size was 2.87.

In the borough the population was spread out, with 21.8% under the age of 18, 7.2% from 18 to 24, 34.8% from 25 to 44, 22.5% from 45 to 64, and 13.7% who were 65 years of age or older. The median age was 37 years. For every 100 females there were 96.6 males. For every 100 females age 18 and over, there were 99.1 males.

The median income for a household in the borough was $30,781, and the median income for a family was $31,667. Males had a median income of $27,708 versus $21,538 for females. The per capita income for the borough was $14,063. About 9.2% of families and 8.6% of the population were below the poverty line, including 13.5% of those under the age of eighteen and none of those sixty-five or over.

== Government ==
Eastvale is governed by a borough council with at least five members. As of the end of 2008, the council president was Pamela Cupac.

== Education ==
Eastvale's children attend the schools of the Beaver Falls Area School District. Before the district was formed by consolidation in 1958, Eastvale operated its own school district.

== Public safety ==
While Eastvale formerly had a small volunteer fire department, fire protection in the community is the primary responsibility of the Beaver Falls Fire Department. Eastvale has also contracted with Beaver Falls for police protection since 1997.
