= Beaver River Bridge =

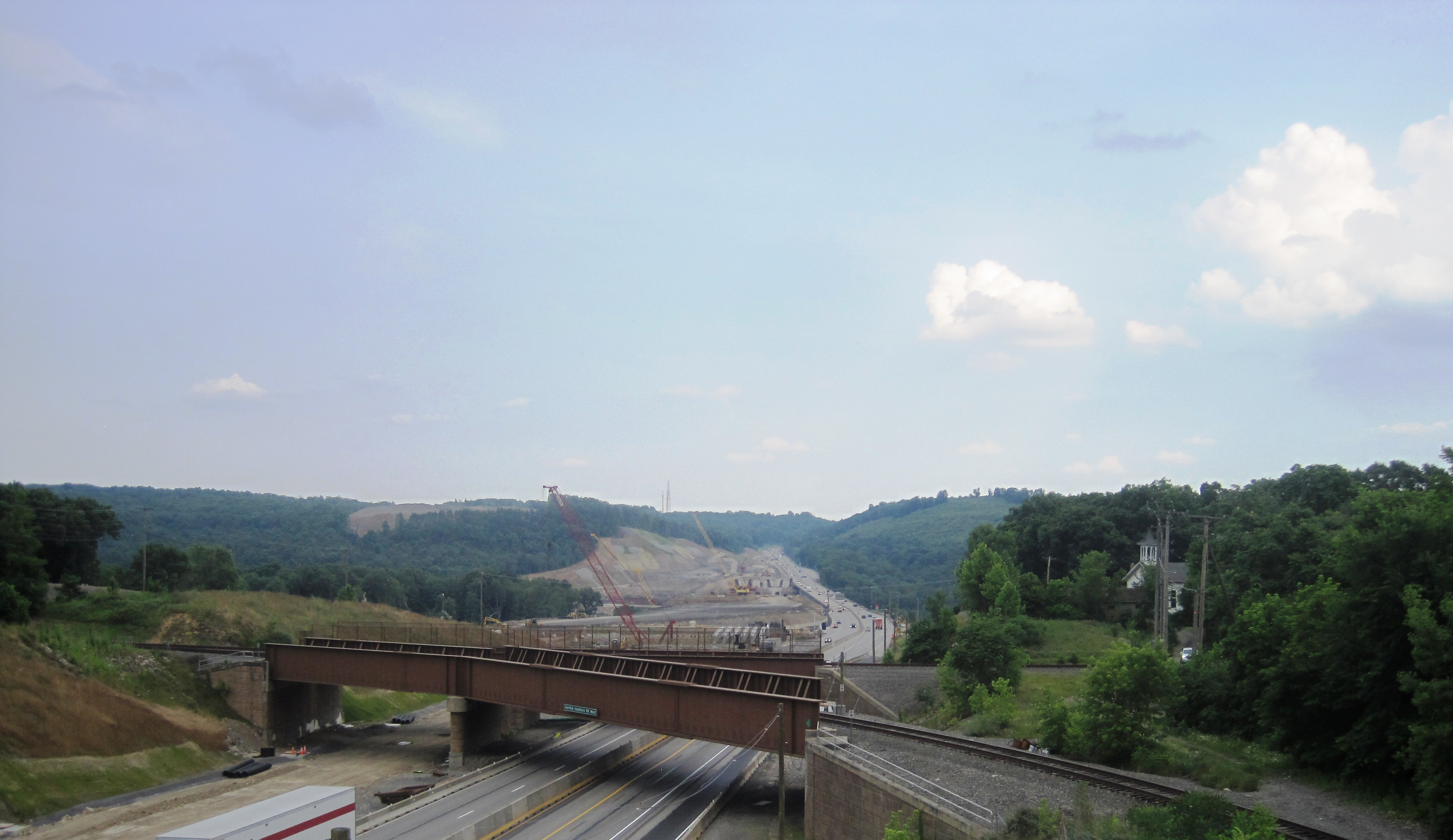
- Construction as seen from Homewood in June 2024
- Coordinates: 40°49′N 80°19′W
- Carries: I-76 / Penna Turnpike
- Crosses: Beaver River
- Locale: North Sewickley Township and Big Beaver
- Official name: Beaver River Bridge
- Other name: Beaver Valley Bridge

Characteristics
- Total length: 1,546 ft (471 m)
- Width: 56 ft (17 m)
- No. of spans: 5
- Clearance below: 170 ft (52 m)
- No. of lanes: 4

History
- Opened: 1952

Location
- Interactive map of Beaver River Bridge

The Beaver River Bridge (also called "Beaver Valley Bridge") is a bridge that carries the Pennsylvania Turnpike across the Beaver River in North Sewickley Township, Pennsylvania. Built in 1951 and opened in 1952, the 74-year-old bridge is being replaced with the construction of a new span to its north. The Beaver River Bridge has a total length of 1,546 ft (471 m) and a clearance below of 170 ft (52 m) making it higher than the Delaware River Bridge's 160 ft (49 m) clearance at the Turnpike's eastern terminus in Bucks County, but lower than the Hawk Falls Bridge's 190 ft (58 m) clearance on the Northeast Extension in Carbon County. The Beaver River Bridge is an example of a mid-20th century cantilever deck truss with preservation groups making efforts to save it from demolition as its structural style is becoming rare. About 20,000 vehicles travel across the bridge each day.

== Replacement ==
In 2012, the Pennsylvania Turnpike Commission set aside nearly $300 million to replace the bridge, and began the design phase of its Milepost 12-14 reconstruction project. The project is a part of an ongoing project along the turnpike to widen the road to a minimum of 3 lanes in each direction with larger shoulders and medians. West of the Beaver Valley Interchange, three overhead bridges (a local road bridge and two Norfolk Southern Railway bridges) were replaced to support the widening of the turnpike between 2015 and 2016. Within the Beaver Valley Interchange, an aging ramp bridge was replaced with a temporary span.

The final design of the replacement bridges, completed by Hardesty & Hanover, are two parallel-running beam bridges. Each bridge will carry three 12 ft (3.7 m) travel lanes, one 12 ft (3.7 m) acceleration/deceleration lane for the nearby interchange, and 12 ft (3.7 m) medians and shoulders. The bridge will be 1,645 ft (501 m) long with 5 spans.

The adjacent Beaver Valley Interchange at the western end of the bridge is being reconfigured to a partial cloverleaf interchange from the current trumpet interchange design. Formerly, the interchange had a toll booth in the middle, but was removed when this section of the Turnpike became free in the early 2000s. Additionally, a new bridge for the turnpike over PA 18 will be constructed shortly to the north of the existing bridge. The temporary bridge that was constructed for the trumpet interchange will be removed.

Construction began on the new bridge and interchange in January 2023 and is expected to conclude in November 2026.

== See also ==
- List of crossings of the Beaver River
