= Rochester Township, Pennsylvania =

Township in Pennsylvania, US

- Township
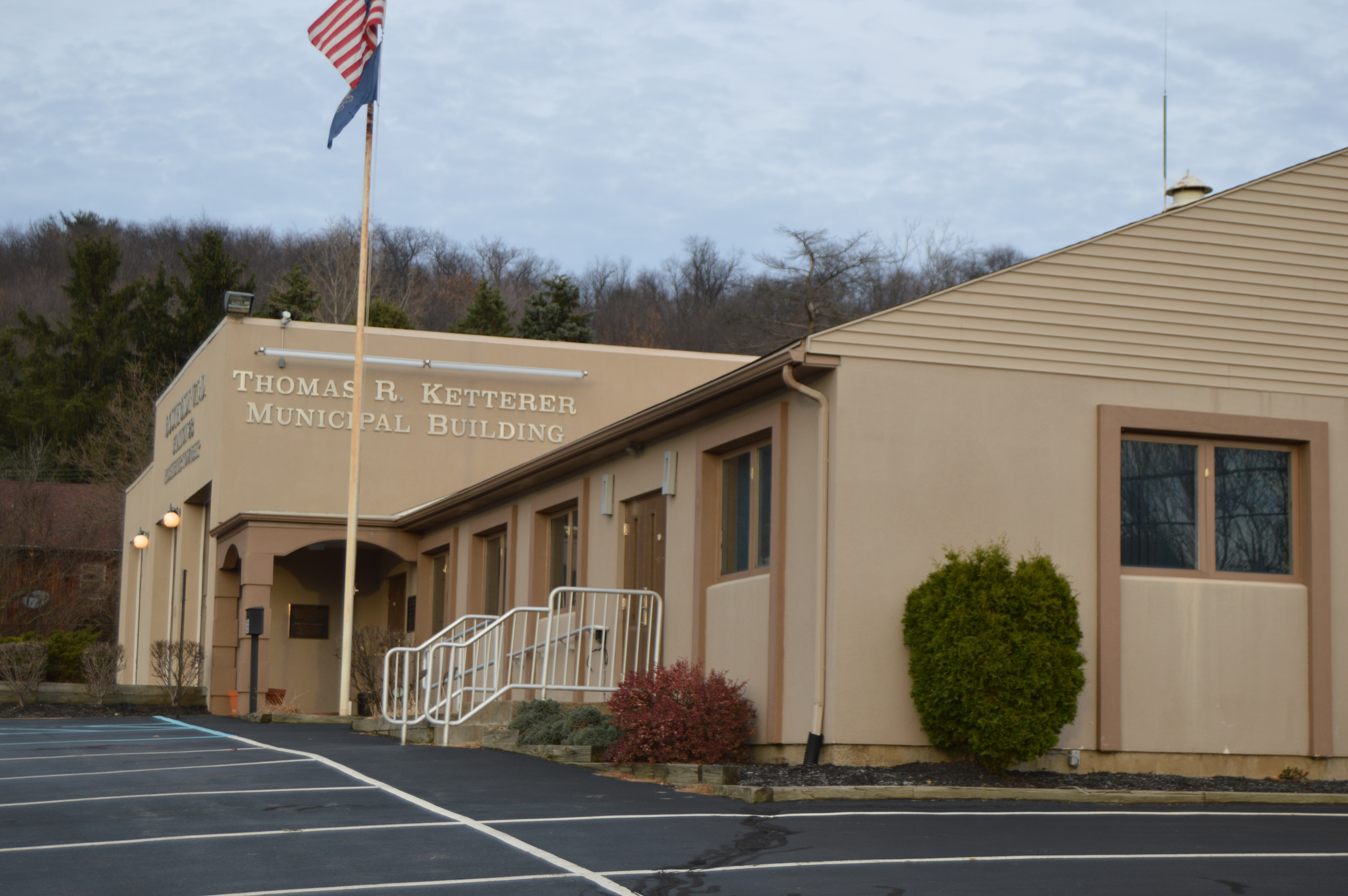
- Municipal building
- Motto: A Home for All Generations
- Location in Beaver County and state of Pennsylvania
- Coordinates: 40°42′50″N 80°16′40″W
- Country: United States
- State: Pennsylvania
- County: Beaver
- Incorporated: 1840

Area
  - Total: 3.95 sq mi (10.23 km^{2})
  - Land: 3.88 sq mi (10.06 km^{2})
  - Water: 0.066 sq mi (0.17 km^{2})

Population (2020)
  - Total: 2,708 ▼
  - Estimate (2021): 2,675
  - Density: 698.3/sq mi (269.62/km^{2})
- Time zone: UTC-5 (Eastern (EST))
  - Summer (DST): UTC-4 (EDT)
- FIPS code: 42-007-65400
- Website: rochestertwp.org

Rochester Township is a township that is located in Beaver County, Pennsylvania, United States. As of the 2020 census, it had a population of 2,708.

It is part of the Pittsburgh metropolitan area.

== History ==
Rochester Township was created from part of New Sewickley Township by an Act of the Pennsylvania State Legislature that was approved on April 14, 1840.

== Geography ==
According to the United States Census Bureau, the township has a total area of 3.9 square miles (10.2 km^{2}), of which 3.9 square miles (10.1 km^{2}) is land and 0.08 square miles (0.2 km^{2}), or 1.66%, is water.

== Demographics ==
Historical population
Census	Pop.	Note	%±
1970	4,089		—
1980	3,427		−16.2%
1990	3,247		−5.3%
2000	3,129		−3.6%
2010	2,802		−10.5%
2020	2,708		−3.4%
2021 (est.)	2,675		−1.2%
U.S. Decennial Census

As of the 2000 census, there were 3,129 people, 1,213 households, and 885 families residing in the township. The population density was 819.9 inhabitants per square mile (316.6/km^{2}). There were 1,268 housing units at an average density of 332.3 per square mile (128.3/km^{2}). The racial makeup of the township was 95.14% White, 3.64% African American, 0.10% Native American, 0.10% Asian, and 1.02% from two or more races. Hispanic or Latino of any race were 0.19% of the population.

There were 1,213 households, out of which 28.2% had children under the age of 18 living with them, 60.1% were married couples living together, 9.3% had a female householder with no husband present, and 27.0% were non-families. 23.2% of all households were made up of individuals, and 11.8% had someone living alone who was 65 years of age or older. The average household size was 2.53 and the average family size was 3.00.

In the township the population was spread out, with 22.2% under the age of 18, 6.6% from 18 to 24, 27.0% from 25 to 44, 25.4% from 45 to 64, and 18.7% who were 65 years of age or older. The median age was 42 years. For every 100 females there were 97.0 males. For every 100 females age 18 and over, there were 93.9 males.

The median income for a household in the township was $37,284, and the median income for a family was $41,607. Males had a median income of $35,000 versus $23,250 for females. The per capita income for the township was $18,528. About 8.2% of families and 8.4% of the population were below the poverty line, including 9.4% of those under age 18 and 7.3% of those age 65 or over.
