= Rochester-Beaver Railroad Bridge =

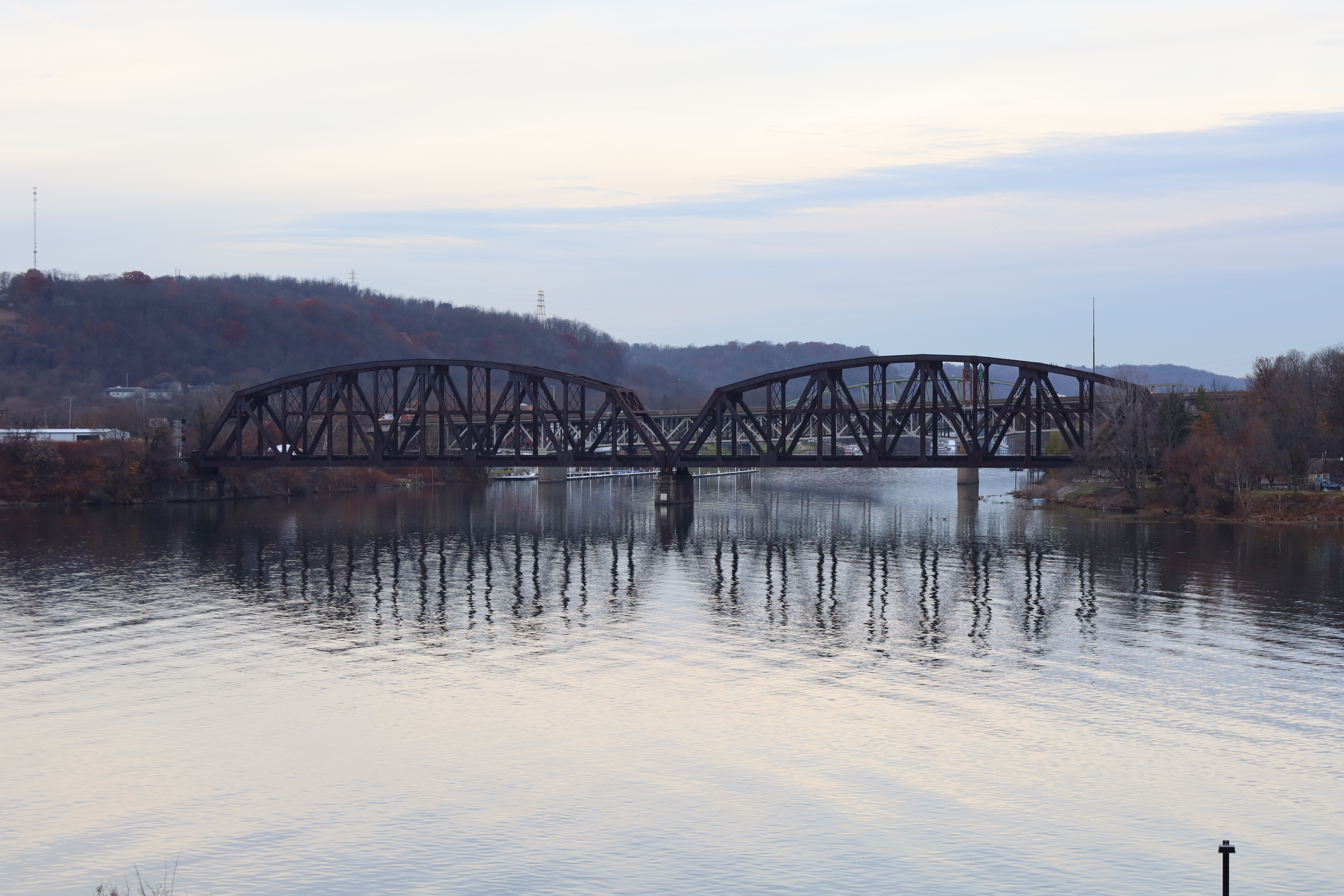
- The bridge in 2025
- Coordinates: 40.698°N 80.2893°W
- Carries: 1 track of the Norfolk Southern Railway
- Crosses: Beaver River
- Locale: Bridgewater, Pennsylvania and Rochester, Pennsylvania

Characteristics
- Design: Warren Truss Bridge
- Width: 656 ft

History
- Opened: 1913

Location
- Interactive map of Rochester-Beaver Railroad Bridge

The Rochester-Beaver Railroad Bridge spans the Beaver River between the boroughs of Rochester, Pennsylvania and Bridgewater, Pennsylvania. It is the second railroad bridge to be constructed on this site and carries one track (formerly two) of the Cleveland Line of Norfolk Southern Railway. The structure is only about 100 feet from the river's mouth at its confluence with the Ohio River.
