= New Brighton, Pennsylvania =

Borough in Pennsylvania, US

- Borough
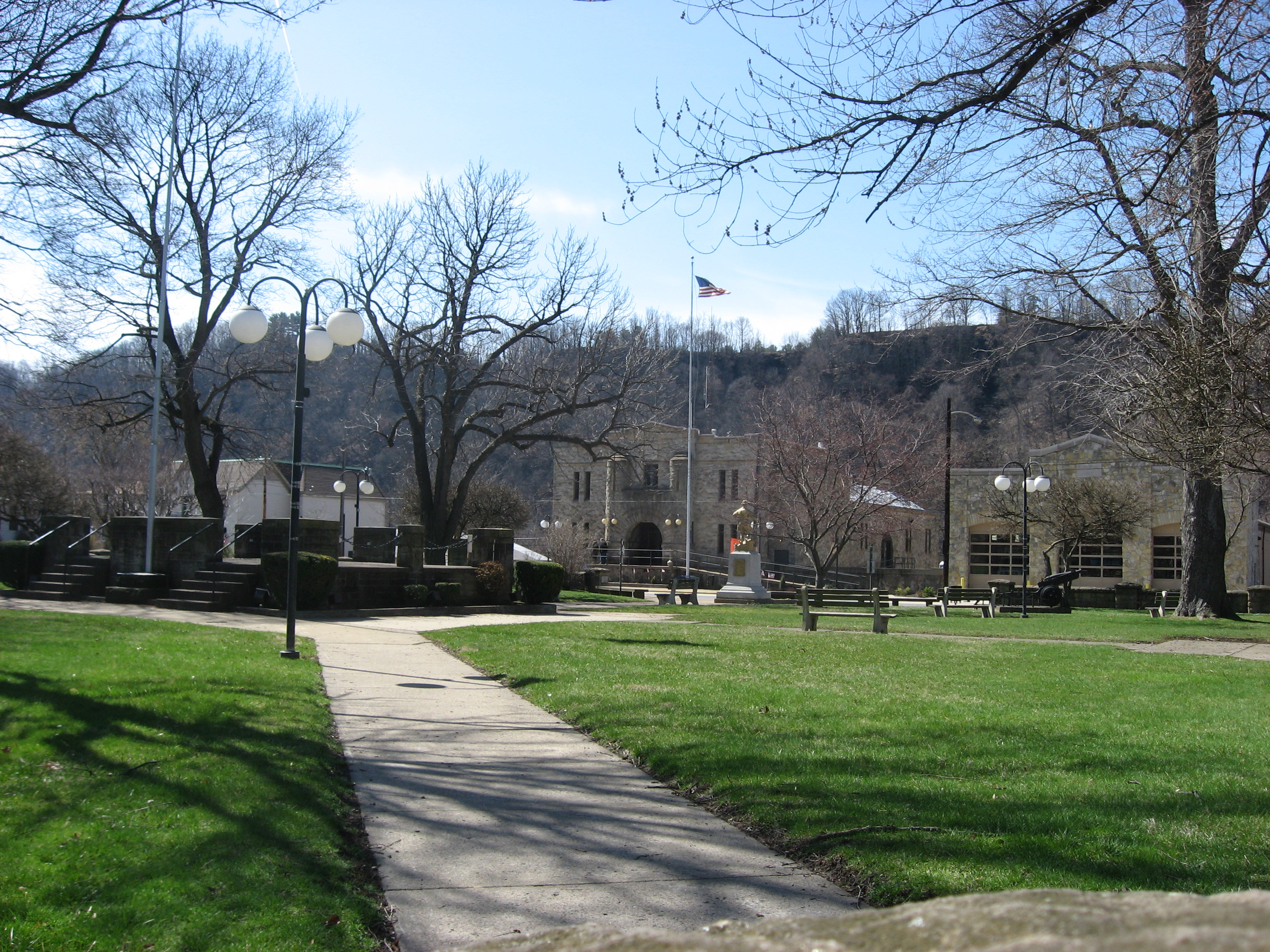
- Community park in New Brighton
- Motto: An American Hometown
- Interactive map of New Brighton, Pennsylvania
- Location within Pennsylvania Location within the United States
- Coordinates: 40°44′11.836″N 80°18′57.856″W
- Country: United States
- State: Pennsylvania
- County: Beaver
- Settled: 1788
- Incorporated: 1838
- Founder: Constable Brothers
- Named for: Brighton, England

Government
  - Type: Mayor-council
  - Mayor: Valerie McElvy (Democrat)
  - Council President: Robert Hartwick

Area
  - Total: 1.12 sq mi (2.90 km^{2})
  - Land: 1.03 sq mi (2.67 km^{2})
  - Water: 0.085 sq mi (0.22 km^{2})
- Elevation: 804 ft (245 m)

Population (2020)
  - Total: 5,729
  - Density: 5,552.5/sq mi (2,143.83/km^{2})
- Time zone: UTC-5 (EST)
  - Summer (DST): UTC-4 (EDT)
- Zip code: 15066
- Area code: 724
- ISO 3166 code: US/USA
- FIPS code: 42-53288
- Website: newbrightonpa.org

New Brighton is a borough in Beaver County, Pennsylvania, United States. It is located along the Beaver River, 28 miles (45 km) northwest of Pittsburgh. The population was 5,729 at the 2020 census. It is part of the Pittsburgh metropolitan area.

== History ==
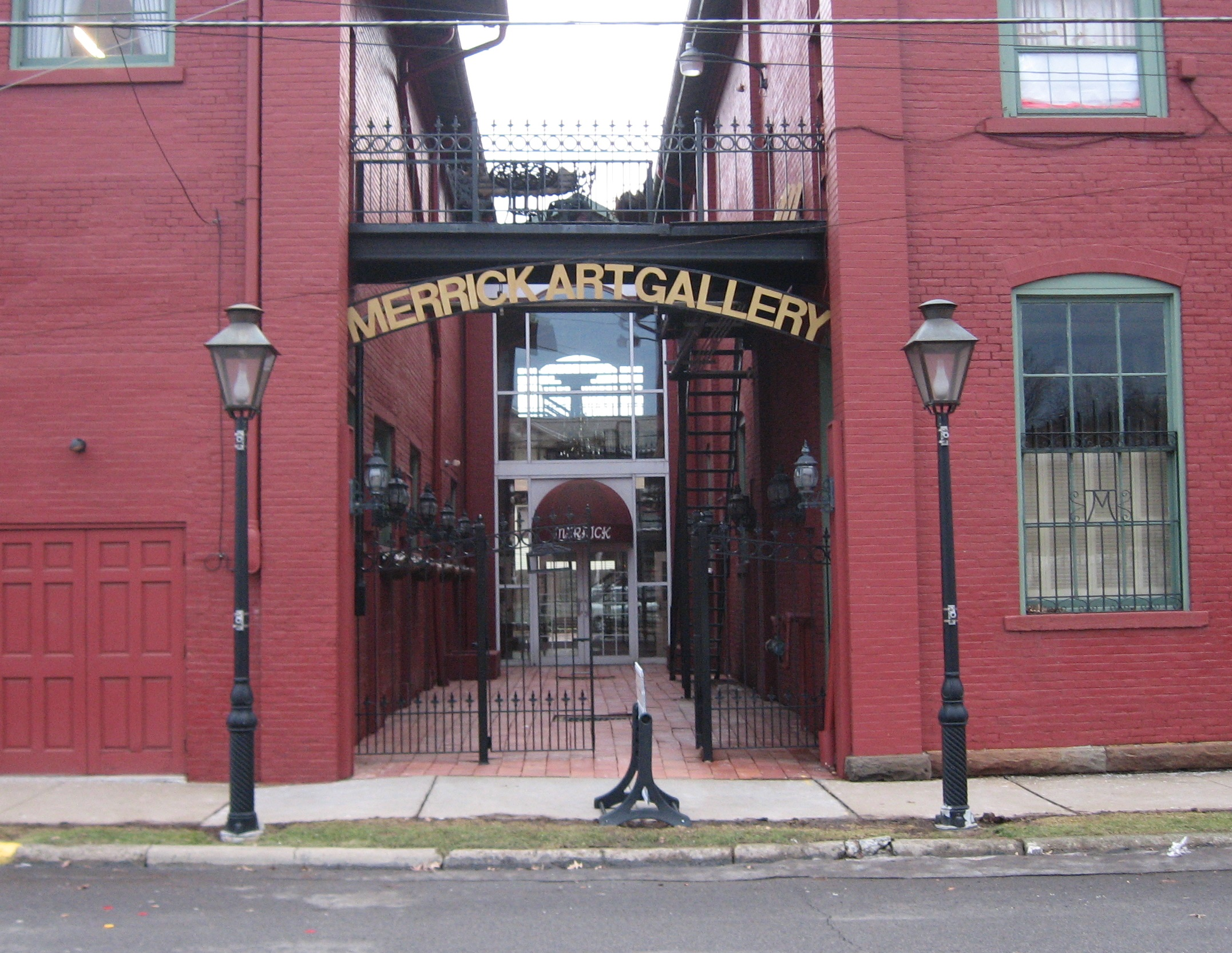
Entrance to the Merrick Art Gallery

In the past, New Brighton had industries in pottery, bricks, sewer pipe, glass, flour, twine, lead kegs, refrigerators, bath tubs, wall paper, steel castings, nails, rivets, and wire.

== Geography ==
New Brighton is located near the center of Beaver County along the east bank of the Beaver River. It is bordered to the north by Daugherty Township, to the east by Pulaski Township, and to the southeast by Rochester Township. To the west, across the Beaver River, are (from north to south) Beaver Falls, Patterson Heights, Patterson Township, and Fallston.

Pennsylvania Routes 18 and 65 run through the center of the borough as Third Avenue. To the south, the concurrent highways run to Rochester on the Ohio River; to the north, PA-18 crosses the Beaver River into Beaver Falls, while PA-65 turns northeast and leads to Ellwood City.

According to the United States Census Bureau, New Brighton has a total area of 1.1 square miles (2.9 km^{2}), of which 1.0 square mile (2.7 km^{2}) is land and 0.08 square miles (0.2 km^{2}), or 7.97%, is water.

== Demographics ==
Historical population
Census	Pop.	Note	%±
1840	981		—
1850	1,428		45.6%
1860	2,001		40.1%
1870	4,037		101.7%
1880	3,653		−9.5%
1890	5,616		53.7%
1900	6,820		21.4%
1910	8,329		22.1%
1920	9,361		12.4%
1930	9,950		6.3%
1940	9,630		−3.2%
1950	9,535		−1.0%
1960	8,397		−11.9%
1970	7,637		−9.1%
1980	7,364		−3.6%
1990	6,854		−6.9%
2000	6,641		−3.1%
2010	6,025		−9.3%
2020	5,729		−4.9%
2021 (est.)	5,653	▼	−1.3%

As of the 2010 census, there were 6,025 people, 2,434 households, and 1,550 families residing in the borough. The population density was 6,450.1 inhabitants per square mile (2,490.4/km^{2}). There were 2,615 housing units at an average density of 2,912.8 per square mile (1,124.6/km^{2}). The racial makeup of the borough was 84% White, 10.7% African American, 0.30% Native American, 0.10% Asian, 0.10% from other races, and 4.8% from two or more races. Hispanic or Latino of any race were 1.5% of the population.

There were 2,631 households, out of which 29.6% had children under the age of 18 living with them, 32.5% were married couples living together, 21.9% had a female householder with no husband present, and 40% were non-families. 36% of all households were made up of individuals, and 14.2% had someone living alone who was 65 years of age or older. The average household size was 2.37 and the average family size was 2.99.

In the borough the population was spread out, with 25.9% under the age of 18, 9.3% from 18 to 24, 29.2% from 25 to 44, 20.9% from 45 to 64, and 14.7% who were 65 years of age or older. The median age was 36 years. For every 100 females, there were 88.1 males. For every 100 females age 18 and over, there were 79.7 males.

The median income for a household in the borough was $25,932, and the median income for a family was $31,538. Males had a median income of $27,297 versus $21,618 for females. The per capita income for the borough was $13,475. About 15.3% of families and 16.6% of the population were below the poverty line, including 21.1% of those under age 18 and 10.0% of those age 65 or over.

== Education ==
Children in New Brighton are served by the New Brighton Area School District. The current schools serving New Brighton are:

- New Brighton Elementary School – grades K–5
- New Brighton Middle School – grades 6–8
- New Brighton High School – grades 9–12

== Notable people ==
- Kevin Bolland (b. 1959), racing driver
- Cecil Brown (1907–1987), journalist and war correspondent broadcaster.
- John Burkett (b. 1964), former Major League Baseball pitcher and currently a professional bowler
- Virginia Carver (b. 1933), pitcher and outfielder who played in the All-American Girls Professional Baseball League
- Jack Clark (b. 1955), former Major League Baseball player.
- Shane Douglas (b. 1964), professional wrestler and promoter, former ECW World Heavyweight Champion.
- Rick Francona (b. 1951), author, commentator, media military analyst, and a retired United States Air Force intelligence officer.
- Terry Francona (b. 1959), former player and now manager of the Cincinnati Reds.
- Tito Francona (1933–2018), Major League Baseball player mostly for the Cleveland Indians.
- Po James (b. 1949), former running back for the National Football League (NFL).
- Sara Jane Lippincott (1823–1904), author, poet, correspondent, lecturer, newspaper founder and reformer.
- Raymond M. Kennedy (1891–1976), guiding light and architect of the Grauman's Chinese Theatre that opened in May 1927.
- Joseph P. Kolter (1926–2019), politician who served United States House of Representatives for Pennsylvania
- John Snarey (1949), Research psychologist and Franklin N. Parker Professor Emeritus of Human Development at Emory University
