= Big Beaver, Pennsylvania =

Borough in Pennsylvania, US

- Borough
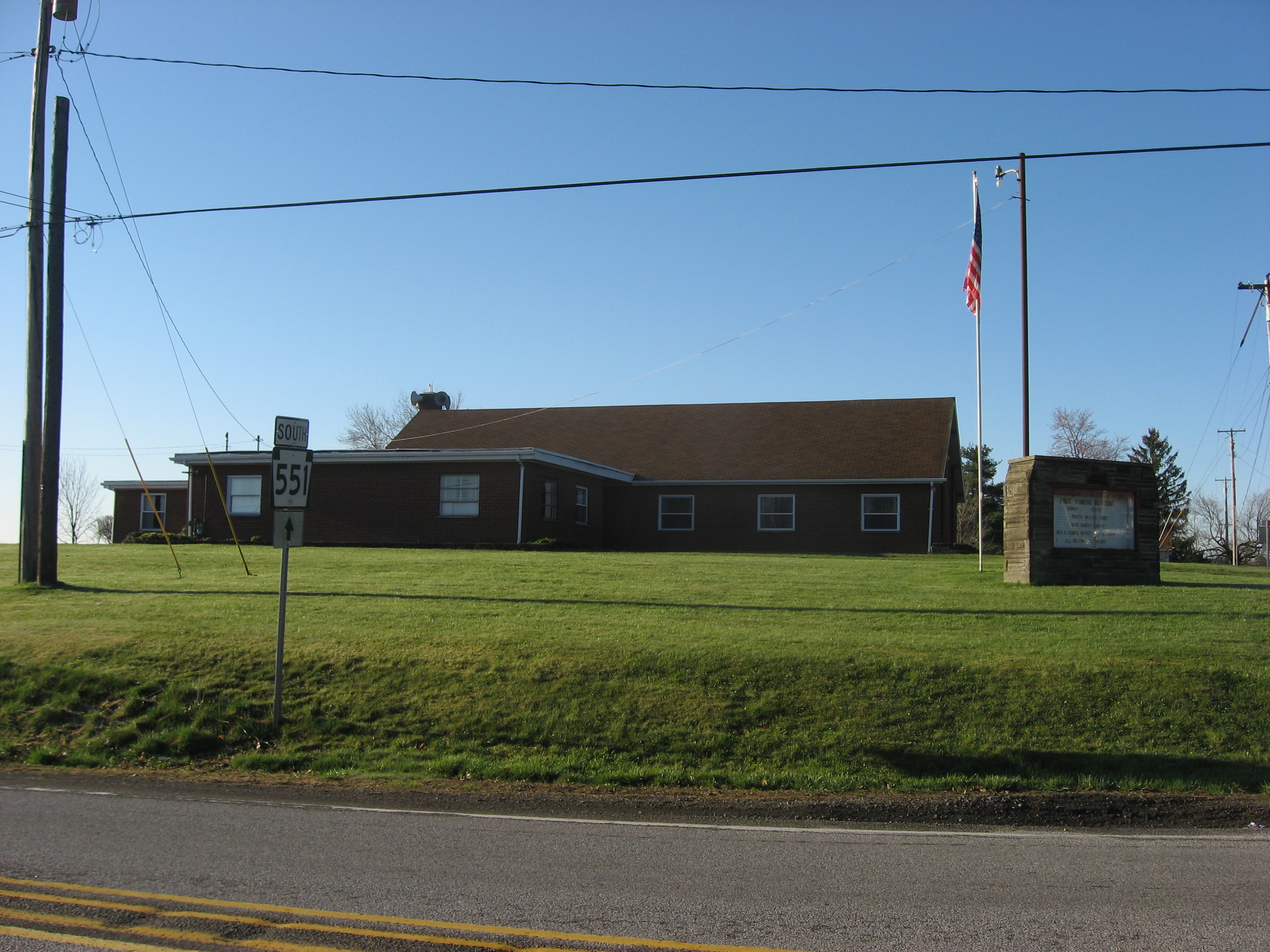
- First Primitive Methodist Church of Beaver Falls
- Interactive map of Big Beaver, Pennsylvania
- Location within Pennsylvania Location within the United States
- Coordinates: 40°49′22″N 80°22′11″W
- Country: United States
- State: Pennsylvania
- County: Beaver
- Settled: 1802
- Incorporated: 1858

Government
  - Type: Borough Council

Area
  - Total: 18.03 sq mi (46.69 km^{2})
  - Land: 17.80 sq mi (46.09 km^{2})
  - Water: 0.23 sq mi (0.60 km^{2})
- Elevation: 1,089 ft (332 m)

Population (2020)
  - Total: 1,852
  - Density: 104.1/sq mi (40.19/km^{2})
- Time zone: UTC-5 (Eastern (EST))
  - Summer (DST): UTC-4 (EDT)
- Area code: 724
- FIPS code: 42-06240
- Website: bigbeaverborough.org

Big Beaver is a borough in northern Beaver County, Pennsylvania, United States. The population was 1,852 at the 2020 census. It is a part of the Pittsburgh metropolitan area. The area was originally incorporated as Big Beaver Township in 1802, and was reincorporated as a borough in 1958.

== Geography ==
Big Beaver is located at 40°49′22″N 80°22′11″W (40.822723, −80.369682). It is located 34.1 miles from Pittsburgh as the crow flies and 44 miles by road.

According to the United States Census Bureau, the borough has a total area of 18.0 square miles (47 km^{2}), of which 17.8 square miles (46 km^{2}) is land and 0.2 square miles (0.52 km^{2}) (1.00%) is water.

Big Beaver Borough is drained by tributaries of the Beaver River in the east and North Fork of Little Beaver Creek in the west. Beaver River tributaries include Stockman Run, Clarks Run, and Wallace Run.

=== Surrounding neighborhoods ===
Big Beaver borders nine municipalities, including New Beaver in Lawrence County to the north, Koppel to the northeast, North Sewickley Township to the east, Beaver Falls to the southeast, West Mayfield to the south-southeast, Chippewa Township to the south, and Darlington Township and New Galilee to the west. The borough of Homewood is situated entirely within Big Beaver to the southeast.

== Demographics ==
Historical population
Census	Pop.	Note	%±
1960	2,381		—
1970	2,739		15.0%
1980	2,815		2.8%
1990	2,298		−18.4%
2000	2,186		−4.9%
2010	1,970		−9.9%
2020	1,852		−6.0%
2021 (est.)	1,831	▼	−1.1%

As of the 2000 census, there were 2,186 people, 869 households, and 635 families residing in the borough. The population density was 122.7 inhabitants per square mile (47.4/km^{2}). There were 905 housing units at an average density of 50.8 units per square mile (19.6 units/km^{2}). The racial makeup of the borough was 98.17% White, 0.69% African American, 0.23% Native American, 0.18% Asian, 0.18% from other races, and 0.55% from two or more races. Hispanic or Latino of any race were 0.78% of the population.

There were 869 households, out of which 26.5% had children under the age of 18 living with them, 63.2% were married couples living together, 7.1% had a female householder with no husband present, and 26.9% were non-families. 23.2% of all households were made up of individuals, and 10.7% had someone living alone who was 65 years of age or older. The average household size was 2.47 and the average family size was 2.90.

In the borough the population was spread out, with 20.1% under the age of 18, 5.5% from 18 to 24, 26.8% from 25 to 44, 29.5% from 45 to 64, and 18.1% who were 65 years of age or older. The median age was 44 years. For every 100 females, there were 95.2 males. For every 100 females age 18 and over, there were 96.3 males.

The median income for a household in the borough was $37,297, and the median income for a family was $43,523. Males had a median income of $34,688 versus $23,945 for females. The per capita income for the borough was $17,228. About 7.0% of families and 9.8% of the population were below the poverty line, including 16.2% of those under age 18 and 4.5% of those age 65 or over.

== Education ==
Children in Big Beaver are served by the Big Beaver Falls Area School District. The current schools serving Big Beaver are:

- Big Beaver Elementary School – grades K–5
- Beaver Falls Middle School – grades 6–8
- Beaver Falls High School – grades 9–12

== Transportation ==
The Pennsylvania Turnpike passes east–west through the borough. It leads west to Youngstown, Ohio, and east to Pittsburgh and Harrisburg. It has two interchanges within the town limits: Exit 10 (I-376 and PA 351) and Exit 13 (PA 18). Both PA 18 and I-376 follow north–south routing (though I-376 is signed east–west) leading north to New Castle and Erie. PA 18 leads south to Washington, whereas I-376 runs south (east) to Pittsburgh.

PA 168, PA 351, and PA 551 also pass through the borough. PA 168 passes north–south through the western areas of the borough. PA 351 passes east–west right through the center of the borough and collects an interchange via Shenango Road to I-376 and I-76. PA 551 terminates at PA 18 just south of the borough limits before passing through the southern edge of the borough.

== Recreation ==
A small portion of the Pennsylvania State Game Lands Number 148 is located along the northern border of Big Beaver.
