= Snake Run (Beaver River tributary) =

River in Pennsylvania

Snake Run Tributary to Beaver River
- Location of Snake Run mouth Snake Run (Beaver River tributary) (the United States)

Location
- Country: United States of America
- State: Pennsylvania
- County: Lawrence

Physical characteristics
- Source: divide between Snake Run and McKee Run
  - location: about 3 miles east of West Pittsburg, Pennsylvania
  - coordinates: 40°56′05″N 080°18′47″W
  - elevation: 1,200 ft (370 m)
- Mouth: Beaver River
  - location: Wampum, Pennsylvania
  - coordinates: 40°53′23″N 080°20′11″W
  - elevation: 740 ft (230 m)
- Length: 3.25 mi (5.23 km)
- Basin size: 2.99 square miles (7.7 km^{2})
- Discharge
  - average: 3.50 cu ft/s (0.099 m^{3}/s) at mouth with Beaver River

Basin features
- Progression: southwest
- River system: Beaver River
- Tributaries
  - left: unnamed tributaries
  - right: unnamed tributaries

Snake Run is a tributary of the Beaver River in western Pennsylvania. The stream rises in south-central Lawrence County and flows southwest entering the Beaver River at Wampum, Pennsylvania. The watershed is roughly 20% agricultural, 71% forested and the rest is other uses.

== See also ==
- List of rivers of Pennsylvania
