= Mahoning River =

River in Ohio and Pennsylvania, United States

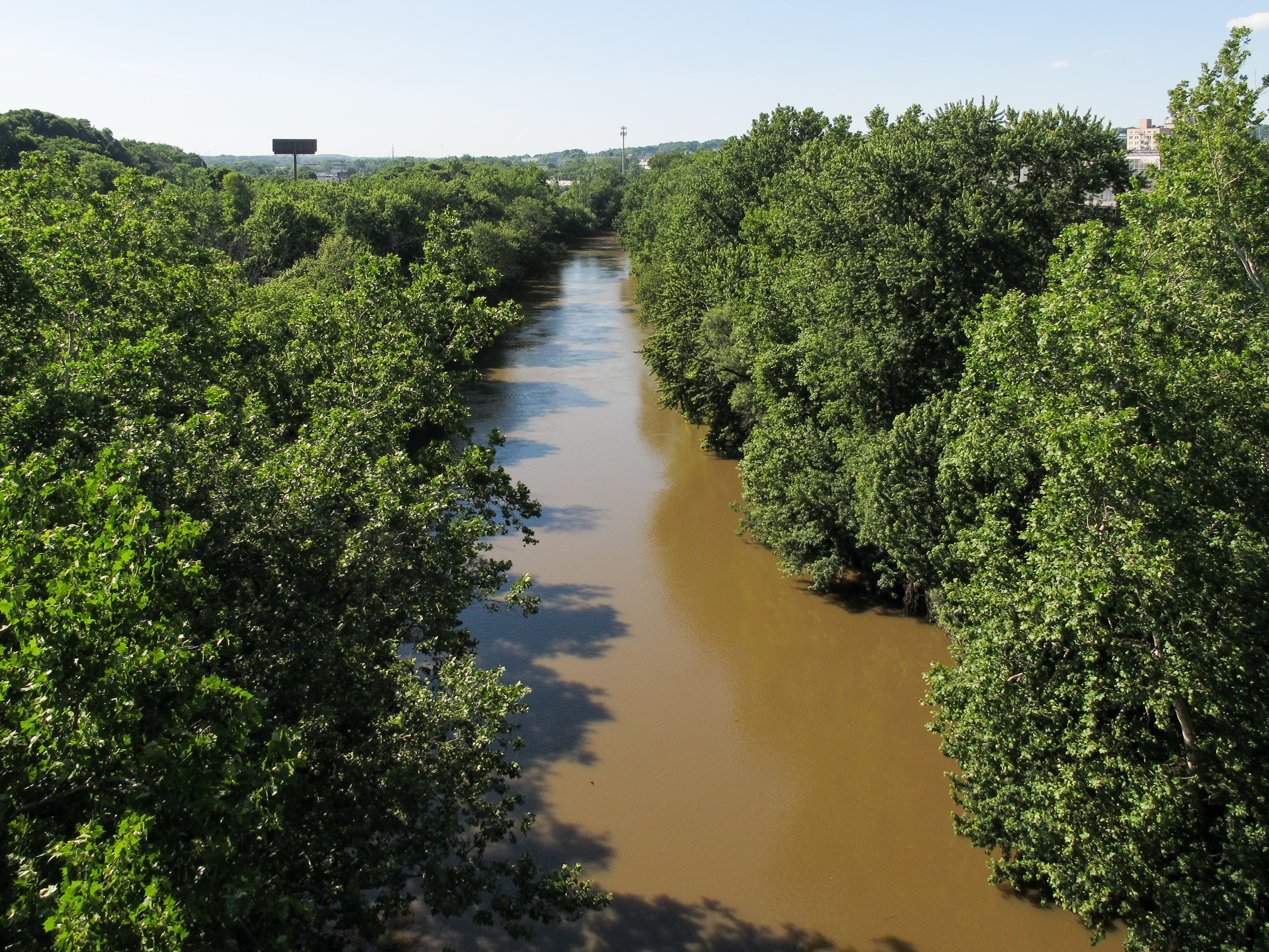
- The Mahoning River in Youngstown, Ohio

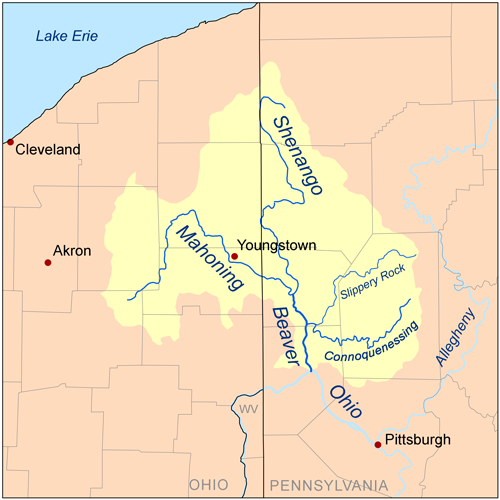
- Map of the Beaver River watershed including the Mahoning River

Location
- Country: United States
- States: Ohio, Pennsylvania

Physical characteristics
- Source
  - location: One half mile southwest of Winona, Ohio
  - coordinates: 40°49′18″N 80°54′12″W
  - elevation: 395 m (1,296 ft) above sea level
- Mouth: Beaver River
  - location: near Mahoningtown, New Castle, Pennsylvania
  - coordinates: 40°57′29″N 80°22′43″W
  - elevation: 232 m (761 ft) above sea level
- Length: 182 km (113 mi)
- Basin size: 2,932 km^{2} (1,132 sq mi)
- Discharge
  - average: 54 m^{3}/s (1,900 cu ft/s)

The Mahoning River is a river in northeastern Ohio and a small portion of western Pennsylvania. Flowing primarily through several Ohio counties, it crosses the state line into Pennsylvania before joining with the Shenango River to form the Beaver River. The Mahoning River drops from 1,296 feet (395 m) at the headwaters near Winona to 761 feet (232 m) at the outfall near Mahoningtown, Pennsylvania. It is part of the Ohio River watershed. The name is said to derive from either the Lenape or Shawnee languages and mean "Deer Lick," as the area was once known for salt springs, but it's possible the name of the Mahoning and several other similarly named landmarks and places in western Pennsylvania (Manayunk, etc) could come from the Lenape, mënehokink (may-nuh-ho-keeng), meaning "place to get water."

== Tributaries ==
=== North Shore ===
- Marshall Run
- Crab Creek
- Grays Run
- Dry Run
- Little Girard Creek
- Mosquito Creek
- Chocolate Run
- Eagle Creek
- West Branch
- Kale Creek
- Willow Creek
- Deer Creek
- Beech Creek
- Beaver Run
- Coffee Run

=== South Shore ===
- Hickory Run
- Hines Run
- Yellow Creek
- Mill Creek (Austintown)
- Fourmile Run
- Meander Creek
- Mud Creek
- Duck Creek
- Lawson Run
- Charley Run Creek
- Mill Creek (Berlin)
- Island Creek
- Fish Creek

== Hydronymy ==
The name comes from Lenape mahonink, meaning "at the licks" or "there is a lick", referring to historic salt licks in the area.

== Physical properties ==
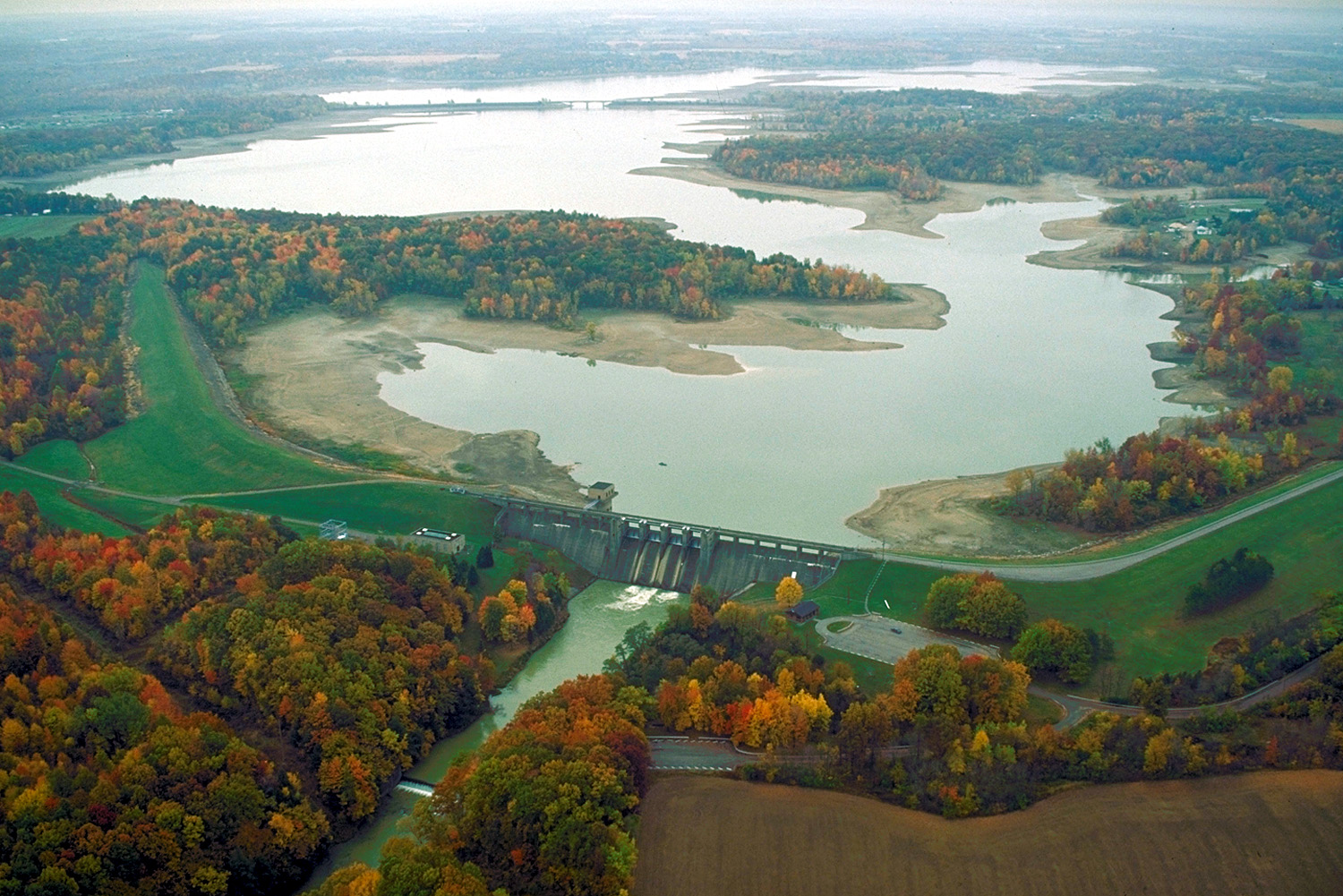
Berlin Lake and Dam on the Mahoning River in Mahoning and Portage Counties. View is upriver to the south-southwest.

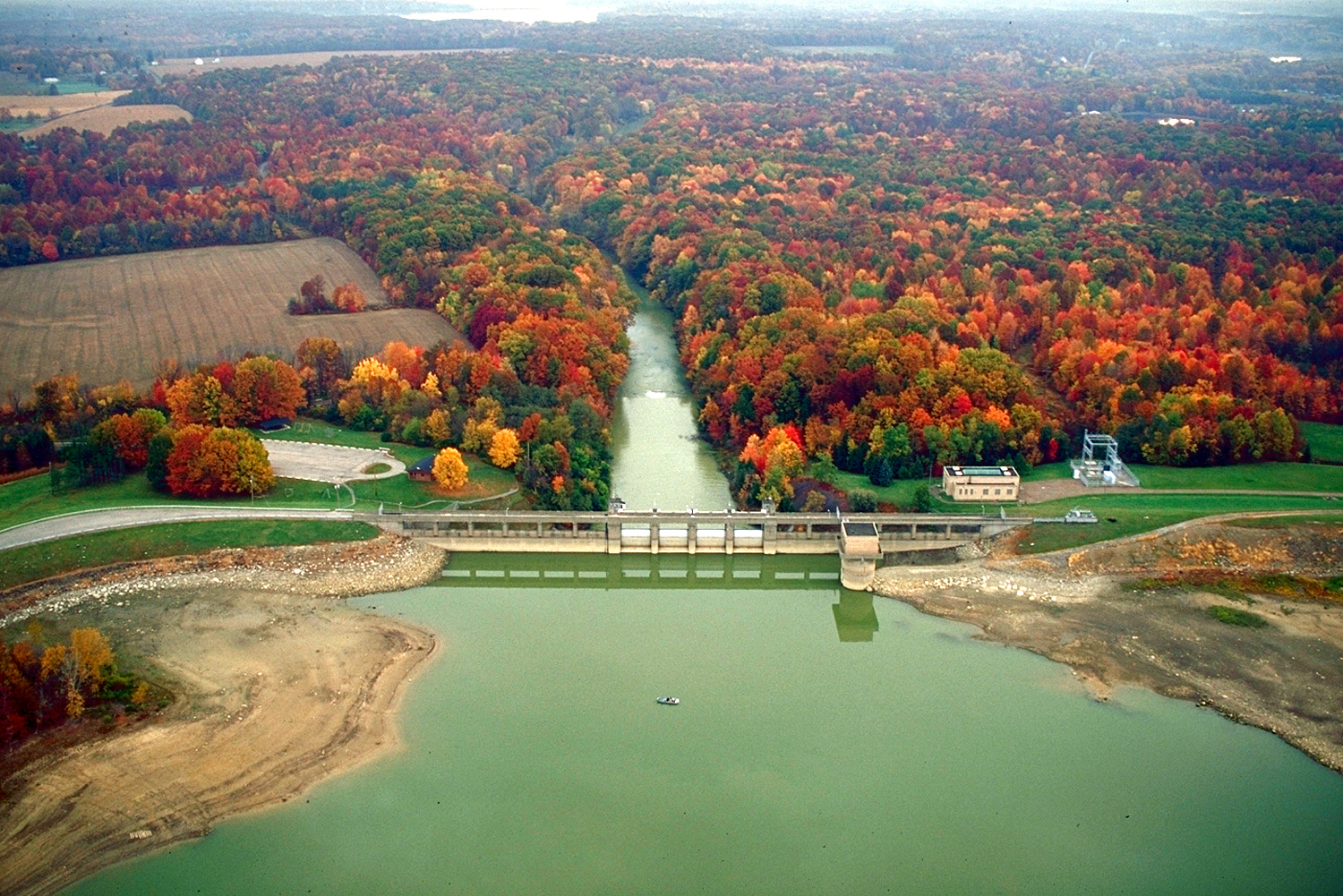
The Mahoning River below Berlin Lake and Dam in Mahoning and Portage counties. Lake Milton can be seen in the far distance to the north-northeast.

The river is formed near Winona in Columbiana County, Ohio, and extends for a length of approximately 113 miles (182 km), with a watershed area of approximately 1,132 square miles (2,932 km²). It joins the Shenango River near Mahoningtown, Pennsylvania south of New Castle to form the Beaver River. The river traverses five Ohio counties—Columbiana, Stark, Portage, Trumbull, and Mahoning—as well as Lawrence County, Pennsylvania. The watershed area also includes parts of Ashtabula and Geauga counties in Ohio.

The three main tributaries are Mosquito Creek, West Branch Mahoning River, and Eagle Creek, all in Ohio. There were a maximum 15 dams on the river course. The river has a course of 97.1 miles (156.3 km) in Ohio, with the remainder in Pennsylvania.

The river supports more than 72 species of fish and 15 species of freshwater mussels.

The river is roughly divided into two sections based on its own character and its surroundings. In addition to the change in terrain addressed in the section on "Floods", the level of human development changes dramatically as well. The “upper elevation”, flowing north and east, extends roughly from Winona to Leavittsburg and is generally rural in nature, meandering through game lands, forests, and agricultural properties. The mainstem (lower elevation), flowing mainly southeast, extends roughly from Leavittsburg to the river's mouth near New Castle, Pennsylvania. Portions of this section are more densely populated and heavily industrialized, including the cities of Warren, Niles, Youngstown, Campbell, and others. The area suffers with residue from all the industrial activity that began in the late 19th century. The mainstem area has a population of over 500,000 and has a long history of steel making, coke production, and other industries.

== Environmental concerns ==
The industrial nature of the mainstem area has caused considerable pollution in the river. Much of the pollution has left the ecosystem via the natural river flow. But analysts estimate that 750,000 cubic yards (573,416 m³) of river bed and shoreline sediment, over a 30-mile (48.2 km) stretch of the mainstem from Leavittsburg to the Pennsylvania border, is so heavily polluted that it will need to be remediated. Approximately 45% of this material is located in the vicinity of the Girard Dam near Girard, Ohio, which has acted as a trap for much of the contaminated sediment.

Petroleum hydrocarbons, benzo(a)pyrene (polycyclic aromatic hydrocarbons), and mercury have all been found in quantities several times the maximum safe levels. Since 1988, the Ohio Department of Health has maintained an advisory against swimming or wading in the river between Leavittsburg and the Pennsylvania border, and also advises against eating fish caught there. The Corps of Engineers estimates that the remediation will take up to 15 years to complete and cost in excess of US$100 million.

Cities and towns along its course include:

- Winona, Ohio
- Alliance, Ohio
- Sebring, Ohio
- Newton Falls, Ohio
- Leavittsburg, Ohio
- Warren, Ohio
- Niles, Ohio
- McDonald, Ohio
- Girard, Ohio
- Youngstown, Ohio
- Campbell, Ohio
- Struthers, Ohio
- Lowellville, Ohio
- Edinburg, Pennsylvania
- Mahoningtown, Pennsylvania

== Floods ==
The Mahoning River is susceptible to frequent flooding during high rain events. A days long flood lasted almost continuously from March 23 to March 26, 1913. Youngstown residents were without water. Damage reached to communities throughout the area, such as Leavittsburg and Lowellville. Losses to the busy industrial area in the region reached the millions of dollars. Flood waters nearly reached the roofs of Republic Steel's plant. Some damaged bridges collapsed. Several water control infrastructure projects followed: The Lake Milton dam was built from 1913 to 1917.

Another dramatic flooding event started when three days of torrential rain fell in July 2003, resulting in such high volume that the river changed its course in Leavittsburg, flooding and destroying nearly 100 homes. For much of the upper half of the river, the land is relatively flat with minimal relief to confine the river. This makes it prone to change courses during high-water events. Around Youngstown, the river valley becomes much more pronounced and the river is more constrained, although there is still room for localized avulsions.

== Restoration efforts ==
Many of the lowhead dams along the course of the Mahoning River were constructed for industrial operations, mainly for cooling the various mills and factories along its banks. With the major decline of steel production in the region, the dams became obsolete. Efforts to revive and restore the river have been explored since the decline of the industry, with actual efforts beginning in the 2010s and 2020s.

A river corridor revitalization plan was finalized in late 2021 by Eastgate Regional Council of Governments, the MPO for the Mahoning Valley, to encourage local communities to reimagine a restored river. The plan emphasized the removal of the lowhead dams and inclusion of parks and economic development along the banks of the Mahoning.

=== Dam removals ===
The several weirs along the Mahoning were the first of restoration efforts to begin. The first dam to be removed was located in Lowellville, which was removed between 2018 and 2020. Following this, the dam in Struthers was next to be removed between 2019 and 2022. After the Struthers dam, a dam in Warren was next to be removed. This dam was located near Summit Street and was removed between 2022 and 2024.

The most controversial dam to be removed was located in Leavittsburg in Trumbull County. Residents in the area did not want the dam removed, leading to some local politicians and elected officials became involved in the efforts to keep the dam. A complaint was filed in the Trumbull County Common Pleas Court in February 2024 claiming removal of the dam would cause adverse conditions in the area. The complaint was ultimately tossed out by Judge Ronald J. Rice as plans to mitigate these issues were part of the future efforts of restoration. The dam in Leavittsburg was removed between late 2025 to early 2026.

As of July 2026, only five of the thirteen dams remain standing.

=== Addition of parks ===
In both Lowellville and Warren, new parks have been constructed where the dams once stood. The new Lowellville park contains a kayak launch, pavilion with seating, restrooms, and historical plaques detailing the history of the area. There are plans for more parks to be implemented along the banks of the Mahoning in the future.

== See also ==
- List of rivers of Ohio
- List of rivers of Pennsylvania
- Mahoning Valley
