= Wallace Run =

Wallace Run is one of six streams with this name in Pennsylvania, United States:

- Wallace Run (Mohongahela River) in Fayette County
- Wallace Run (Clearfield Creek) in Clearfield County
- Wallace Run (Sugar Creek) in Bradford County
- Wallace Run (Oakland Run) in York County
- Wallace Run (Beaver River tributary) in Beaver County
- Wallace Run (Bald Eagle Creek) in Centre County
