= Thompson Run (Beaver River tributary) =

River in Pennsylvania

Thompson Run Tributary to Beaver River
- Location of Thompson Run mouth Thompson Run (Beaver River tributary) (the United States)

Location
- Country: United States of America
- State: Pennsylvania
- County: Beaver

Physical characteristics
- Source: divide between Thompson Run and Brush Run
  - location: about 2 miles east of Homewood, Pennsylvania
  - coordinates: 40°48′22″N 080°17′20″W
  - elevation: 1,140 ft (350 m)
- Mouth: Beaver River
  - location: Homewood, Pennsylvania
  - coordinates: 40°48′37″N 080°19′04″W
  - elevation: 735 ft (224 m)
- Length: 1.32 mi (2.12 km)
- Basin size: 1.51 square miles (3.9 km^{2})
- Discharge
  - average: 1.63 cu ft/s (0.046 m^{3}/s) at mouth with Beaver River

Basin features
- Progression: Beaver River → Ohio River → Mississippi River → Gulf of Mexico
- River system: Beaver River
- Tributaries
  - left: unnamed tributaries
  - right: unnamed tributaries

Thompson Run is a tributary of the Beaver River in western Pennsylvania. The stream rises in north-central Beaver County and flows west entering the Beaver River at Homewood, Pennsylvania. The watershed is roughly 12.5% agricultural, 54% forested and the rest is other uses.

== See also ==
- List of rivers of Pennsylvania
