= Wampum Run =

River in Pennsylvania

Wampum Run Tributary to Beaver River
- Location of Wampum Run mouth Wampum Run (the United States)

Location
- Country: United States of America
- State: Pennsylvania
- County: Lawrence

Physical characteristics
- Source: divide between Wampum Run and North Fork Little Beaver Creek
  - location: about 2 miles south of Coverdale, Pennsylvania
  - coordinates: 40°51′41″N 080°21′46″W
  - elevation: 1,120 ft (340 m)
- Mouth: Beaver River
  - location: Wampum, Pennsylvania
  - coordinates: 40°53′17″N 080°20′09″W
  - elevation: 740 ft (230 m)
- Length: 2.49 mi (4.01 km)
- Basin size: 2.72 square miles (7.0 km^{2})
- Discharge
  - average: 3.06 cu ft/s (0.087 m^{3}/s) at mouth with Beaver River

Basin features
- Progression: Beaver River → Ohio River → Mississippi River → Gulf of Mexico
- River system: Beaver River
- Tributaries
  - left: unnamed tributaries
  - right: unnamed tributaries

Wampum Run is a tributary of the Beaver River in western Pennsylvania. The stream rises in south-central Lawrence County and flows northeast entering the Beaver River at Wampum, Pennsylvania. The watershed is roughly 11% agricultural, 83% forested and the rest is other uses.
