= Beaver River (Pennsylvania) =

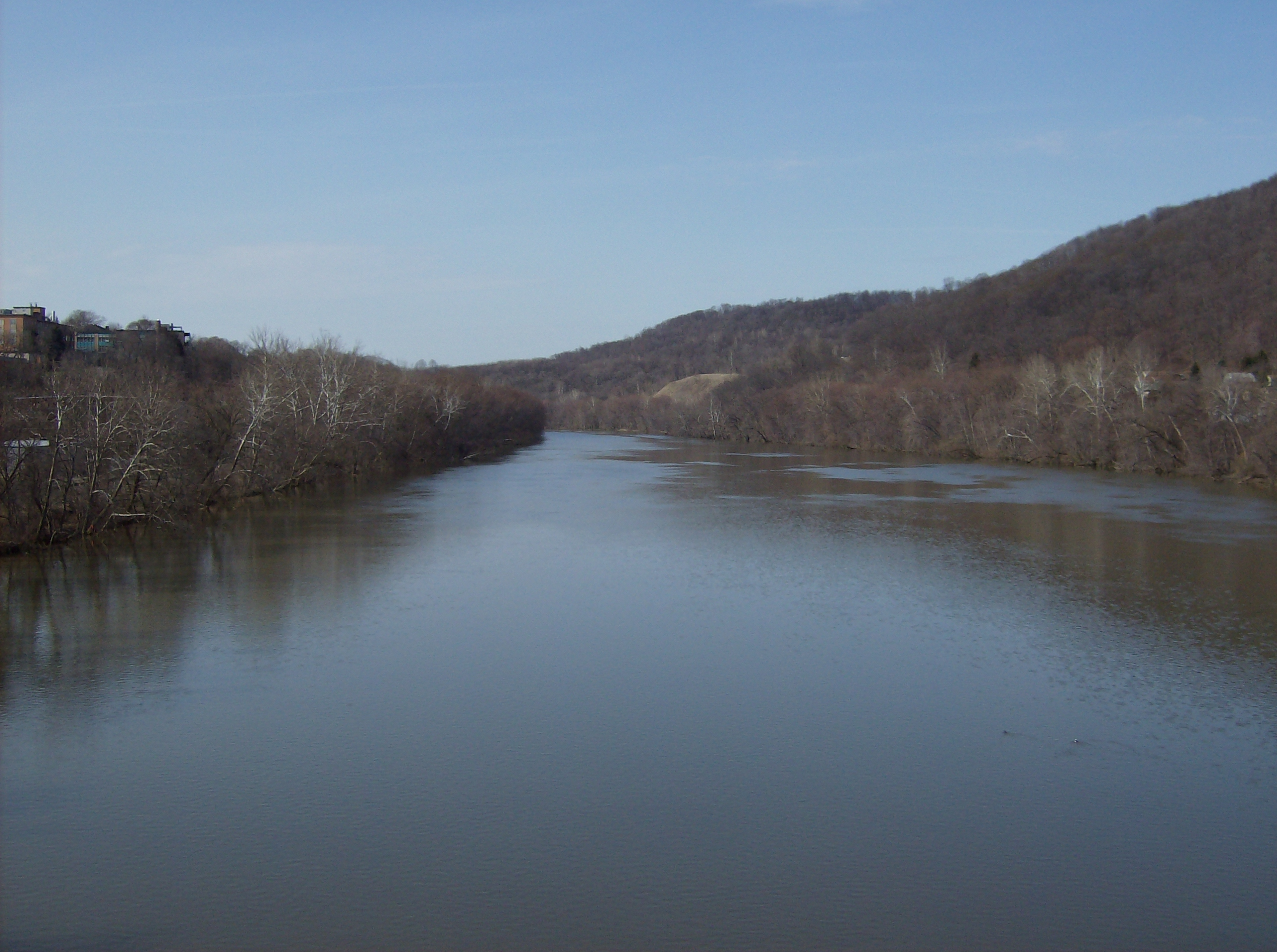
- Looking northward along the Beaver River at Beaver Falls.

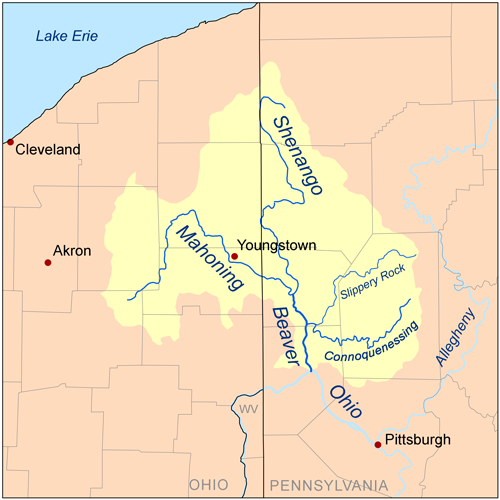

Location
- Country: United States
- State: Pennsylvania
- Counties: Lawrence, Beaver
- Cities: Beaver Falls, New Brighton, Rochester, Bridgewater

Physical characteristics
- Source: Confluence of Mahoning River and Shenango River
  - location: Mahoningtown, New Castle
  - coordinates: 40°57′29″N 80°22′43″W
  - elevation: 760 ft (230 m)
- Mouth: Ohio River
  - location: boundary of Bridgewater and Rochester
  - coordinates: 40°41′49″N 80°17′21″W
  - elevation: 682 ft (208 m)
- Length: 21 mi (34 km)
- Basin size: 3,163.92 square miles (8,194.5 km^{2})
- Discharge
  - average: 4,090.1 cu ft/s (115.82 m^{3}/s) at mouth with Ohio River

Basin features
- Progression: south
- River system: Ohio River
- Tributaries
  - left: McKee Run; Snake Run; Connoquenessing Creek; Thompson Run; Bennett Run; Blockhouse Run; McKinley Run
  - right: Edwards Run; Jenkins Run; Eckles Run; Wampum Run; Stockman Run; Clarks Run; Wallace Run; Walnut Bottom Run; Brady Run; Hamilton Run

Beaver River is a tributary of the Ohio River in Western Pennsylvania. Approximately 21 mi (34 km) long, it flows through a historically important coal-producing region north of Pittsburgh. The river is formed in Lawrence County by the confluence of the Mahoning and Shenango rivers in the Mahoningtown neighborhood of New Castle. It flows generally south, past West Pittsburg and Homewood, then receives Connoquenessing Creek west of Ellwood City and flows past Beaver Falls and New Brighton. It joins the Ohio at Bridgewater and Rochester (flowing between those towns) at the downstream end of a sharp bend in the Ohio approximately 20 mi (32 km) northwest of (and downstream from) Pittsburgh. In the lower reaches near the Ohio River, the Beaver cuts through a gorge of underlying sandstone. The river is roughly parallel to the border with the state of Ohio, with both Interstate 376 and Pennsylvania Route 18 running parallel to the river itself.

The river, which flows throughout the northern half of Beaver County, is the namesake of the county as well as several locales in both Beaver and Lawrence County. The river itself was either named for King Beaver (Tamaqua) of the Delaware nation that had migrated to the area in the late 1740s, or for the animal. Until the partition of Lawrence County from parts of Beaver and Mercer County in 1849, the river was entirely in Beaver County, with its upstream terminus at the border between Beaver and Mercer County from 1800 to 1849.

== Communities along the river ==
- West Pittsburg
- Wampum
- Koppel
- Homewood
- Beaver Falls
- Eastvale
- New Brighton
- Fallston
- Rochester
- Bridgewater

== See also ==
- List of crossings of the Beaver River
- List of rivers of Pennsylvania
