= Homewood, Pennsylvania =

Borough in Pennsylvania, US

- Borough
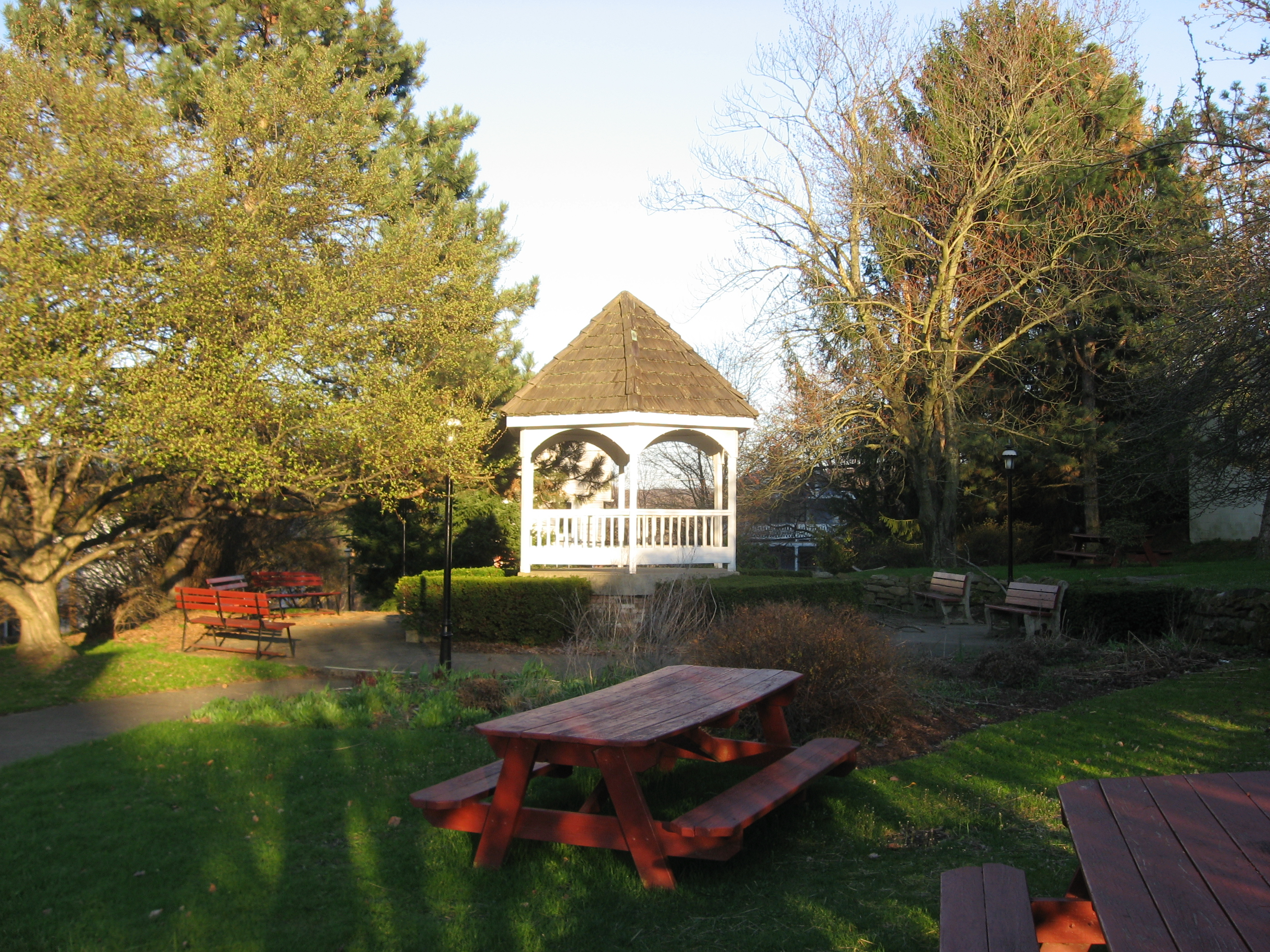
- Old Homewood Park
- Interactive map of Homewood, Pennsylvania
- Location within Pennsylvania Location within the United States
- Coordinates: 40°48′50″N 80°19′47″W
- Country: United States
- State: Pennsylvania
- County: Beaver
- Settled: 1859
- Incorporated: 1910

Government
  - Type: Borough Council

Area
  - Total: 0.17 sq mi (0.44 km^{2})
  - Land: 0.17 sq mi (0.44 km^{2})
  - Water: 0 sq mi (0.00 km^{2})
- Elevation: 971 ft (296 m)

Population (2020)
  - Total: 104
  - Density: 613.8/sq mi (236.99/km^{2})
- Time zone: UTC-5 (Eastern (EST))
  - Summer (DST): UTC-4 (EDT)
- Zip code: 15208
- Area code: 724
- FIPS code: 42-35488

Homewood is a borough that is located in northern Beaver County, Pennsylvania, United States. The population was 104 at the time of the 2020 census.

It is part of the Pittsburgh metropolitan area.

== Geography ==
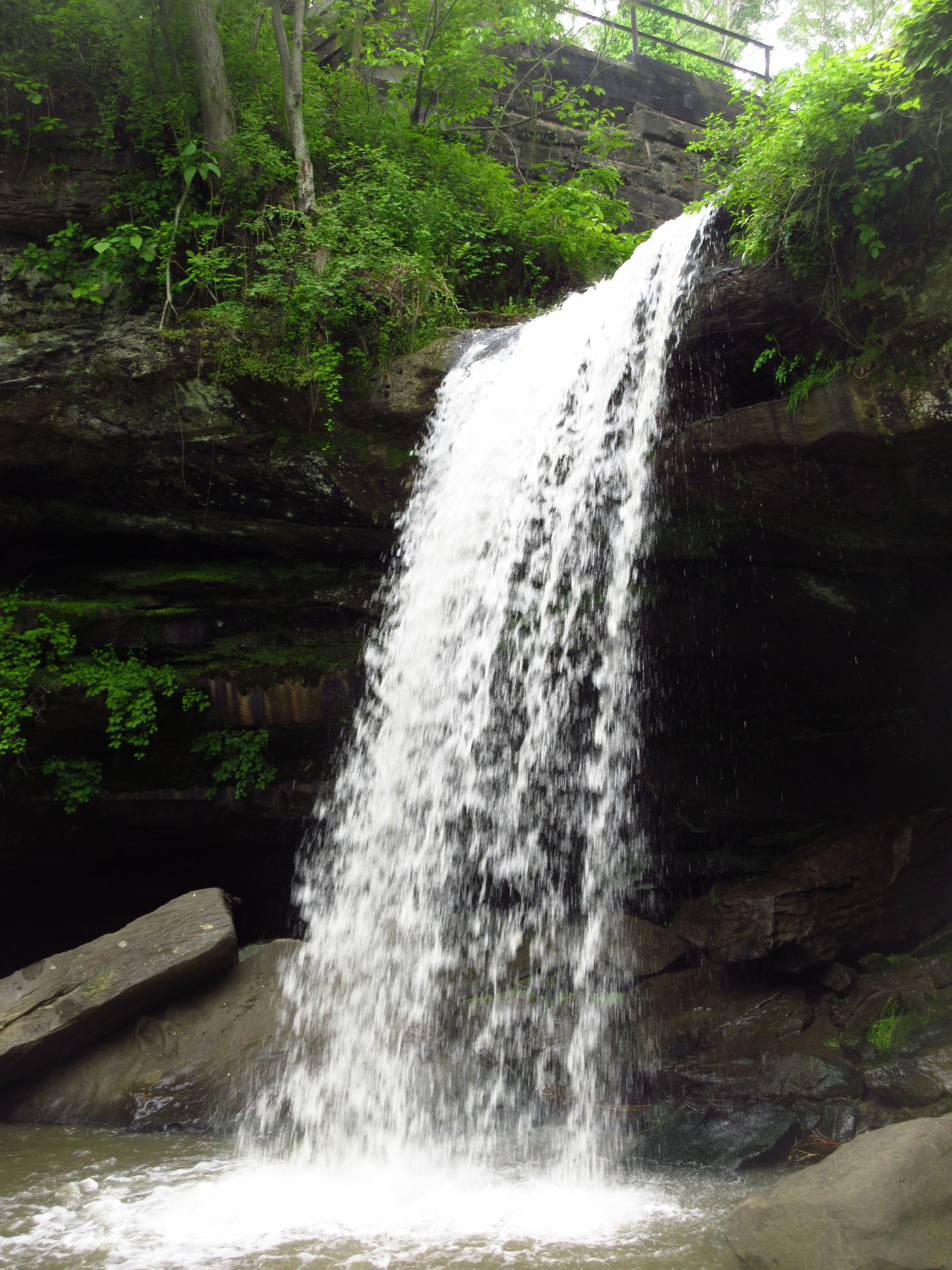
Buttermilk Falls

Homewood is located in northern Beaver County at 40°48′50″N 80°19′47″W (40.813995, −80.329852). It is entirely surrounded by the borough of Big Beaver.

The Pennsylvania Turnpike (Interstate 76) passes through the northeast corner of the borough, with Exit 13 (Pennsylvania Route 18/Big Beaver Boulevard) located just outside the borough limits. PA-18 runs through the eastern edge of the borough.

According to the United States Census Bureau, the borough has a total area of 0.17 square miles (0.44 km^{2}), all land.

The borough has a waterfall within the community, which was named Buttermilk Falls in the year 1870. The waters fall into a natural basin of solid sandstone. The town lends its name to the Homewood Formation, the sandstone rock layer which is exposed at Buttermilk Falls. The Homewood Formation is the upper member of the Pottsville Group (Wanless, 1939).

Homewood is drained by Clarks Run, which flows into the Beaver River a short distance to the east.

== Demographics ==
Historical population
Census	Pop.	Note	%±
1880	267		—
1920	310		—
1930	343		10.6%
1940	357		4.1%
1950	316		−11.5%
1960	305		−3.5%
1970	212		−30.5%
1980	188		−11.3%
1990	162		−13.8%
2000	147		−9.3%
2010	109		−25.9%
2020	104		−4.6%
2021 (est.)	103	▼	−1.0%

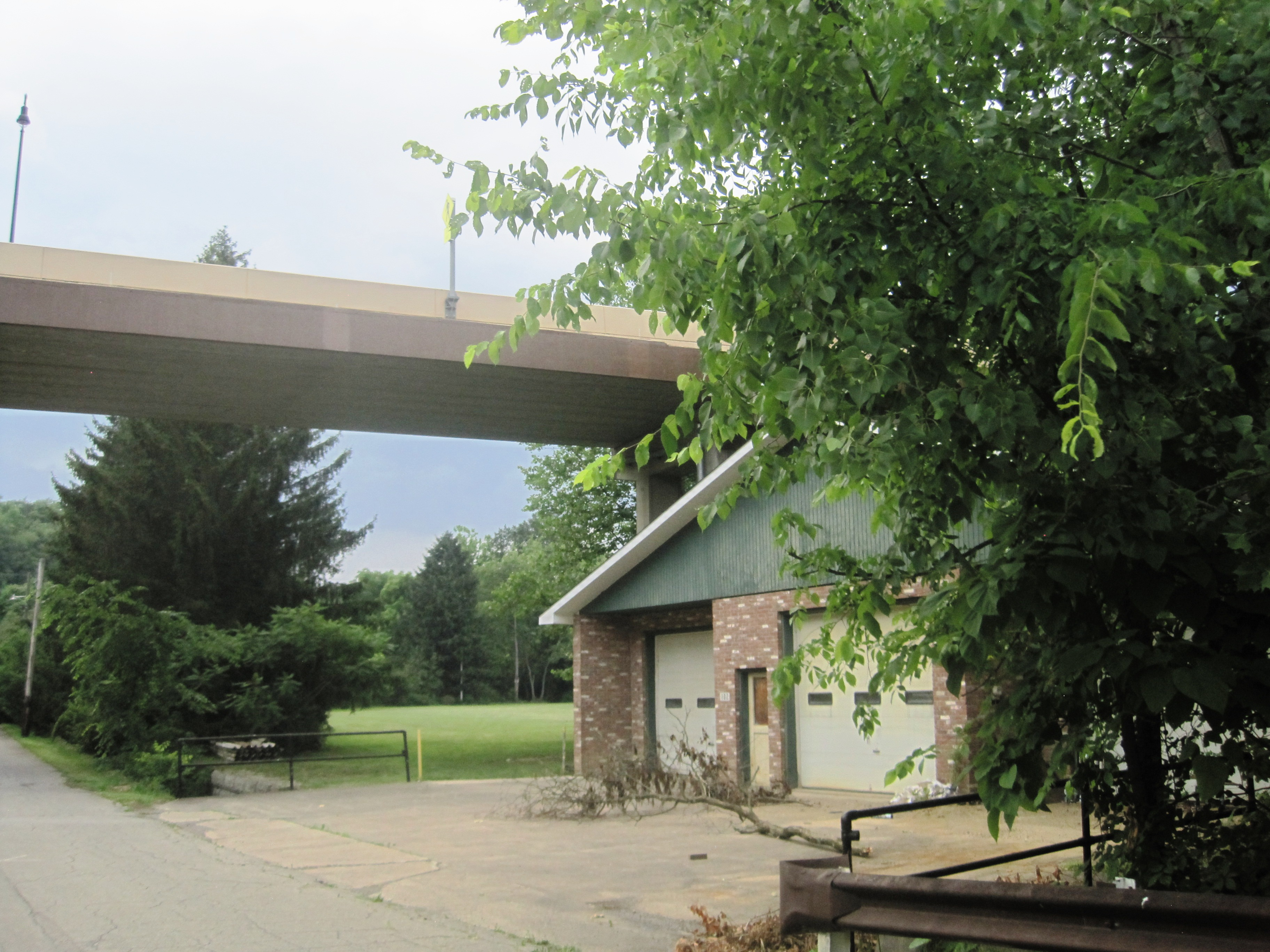
Homewood Municipal Building

As of the 2000 census, there were 147 people, 59 households, and 37 families residing in the borough.

The population density was 855.1 inhabitants per square mile (330.2/km^{2}). There were 62 housing units at an average density of 360.7 per square mile (139.3/km^{2}).

The racial makeup of the borough was 94.56% White, 2.04% African American, and 3.40% Native American.

There were 59 households, out of which 15.3% had children under the age of 18 living with them; 47.5% were married couples living together, 10.2% had a female householder with no husband present, and 35.6% were non-families. 28.8% of all households were made up of individuals, and 8.5% had someone living alone who was 65 years of age or older.

The average household size was 2.49 and the average family size was 3.08.

In the borough, the population was spread out, with 15.0% under the age of 18, 13.6% from 18 to 24, 26.5% from 25 to 44, 27.9% from 45 to 64, and 17.0% who were 65 years of age or older. The median age was 42 years.

For every 100 females, there were 96.0 males. For every 100 females who were aged 18 or older, there were 101.6 males.

The median income for a household in the borough was $33,333, and the median income for a family was $52,500. Males had a median income of $31,250 compared with that of $20,357 for females.

The per capita income for the borough was $34,486.

There were 4.5% of families and 9.0% of the population living below the poverty line, including 16.0% of those who were aged 64 or older; however, no one aged 18 or under was living in poverty.

== Education ==
Children in Homewood are served by the Big Beaver Falls Area School District. The current schools serving Homewood are:

- Big Beaver Elementary School – grades K–5
- Beaver Falls Middle School – grades 6–8
- Beaver Falls High School – grades 9–12
