= Clarks Run (Beaver River tributary) =

River in Pennsylvania

Clarks Run Tributary to Beaver River
- Location of Clarks Run mouth Clarks Run (Beaver River tributary) (the United States)

Location
- Country: United States of America
- State: Pennsylvania
- County: Beaver

Physical characteristics
- Source: divide between Clarks Run and North Fork Little Beaver Creek
  - location: about 1 mile southeast of New Galilee, Pennsylvania
  - coordinates: 40°49′47″N 080°22′42″W
  - elevation: 1,140 ft (350 m)
- Mouth: Beaver River
  - location: Homewood, Pennsylvania
  - coordinates: 40°48′39″N 080°19′09″W
  - elevation: 735 ft (224 m)
- Length: 3.82 mi (6.15 km)
- Basin size: 3.92 square miles (10.2 km^{2})
- Discharge
  - average: 4.21 cu ft/s (0.119 m^{3}/s) at mouth with Beaver River

Basin features
- Progression: Beaver River → Ohio River → Mississippi River → Gulf of Mexico
- River system: Beaver River
- Tributaries
  - left: unnamed tributaries
  - right: unnamed tributaries

Clarks Run is a tributary of the Beaver River in western Pennsylvania. The stream rises in north-central Beaver County and flows generally east entering the Beaver River at Homewood, Pennsylvania. The watershed is roughly 20% agricultural, 62% forested and the rest is other uses.
