= Mahoningtown, Pennsylvania =

Neighborhood in New Castle, Pennsylvania, US

Mahoningtown
- Neighborhood
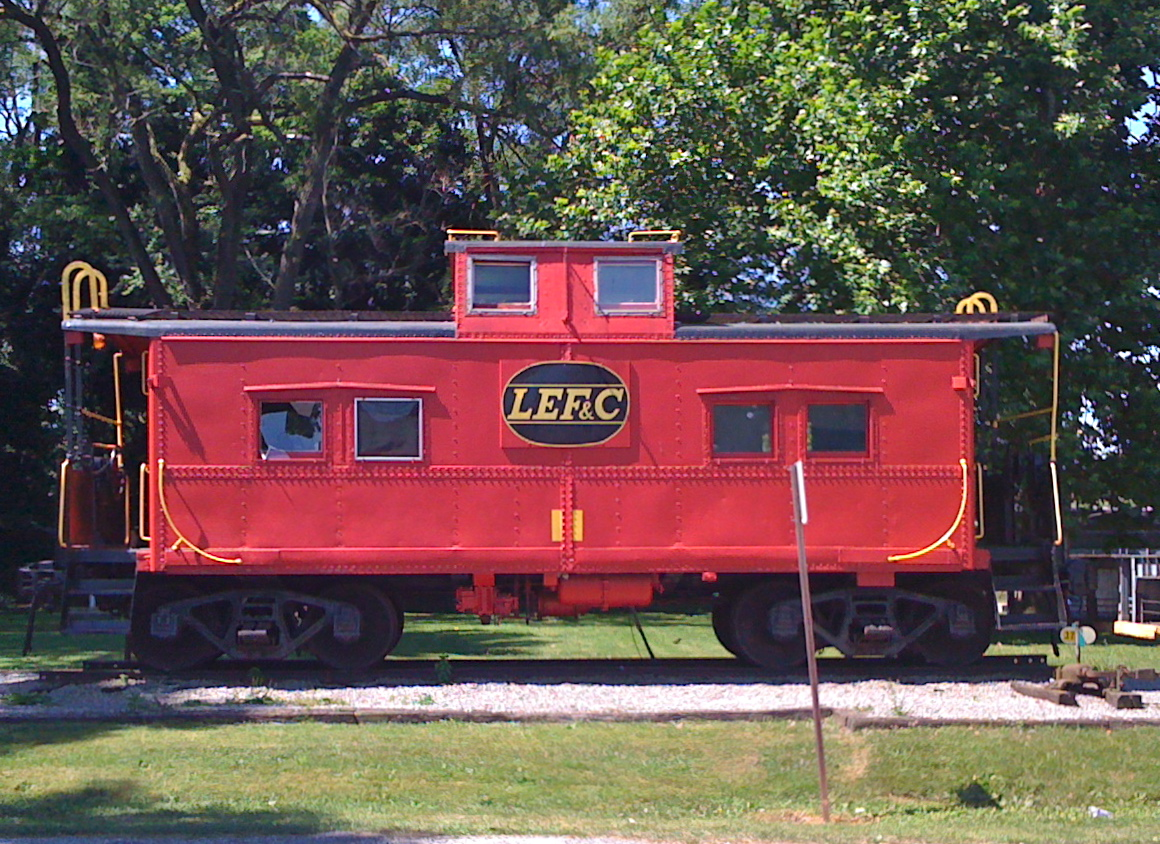
- Caboose in Darlington Park
- Interactive map of Mahoningtown
- Coordinates: 40°58′28″N 80°22′20″W
- Country: United States
- State: Pennsylvania
- County: New Castle County
- City: New Castle

Mahoningtown, also known as "Motown", is a neighborhood in the southwestern part of the city of New Castle, Pennsylvania, United States. Though it is named for the nearby Mahoning River, the city actually sits on the banks of the Shenango River. The two rivers merge and become the Beaver River just south of the city.

Mahoningtown is located in Lawrence County at latitude 40.975 and longitude -80.372. Located about two and one-half miles south of New Castle in Taylor township, Mahoningtown was at one time a separate municipality before being annexed by New Castle. Mahoningtown officially became the seventh ward of New Castle, Pennsylvania in 1898.

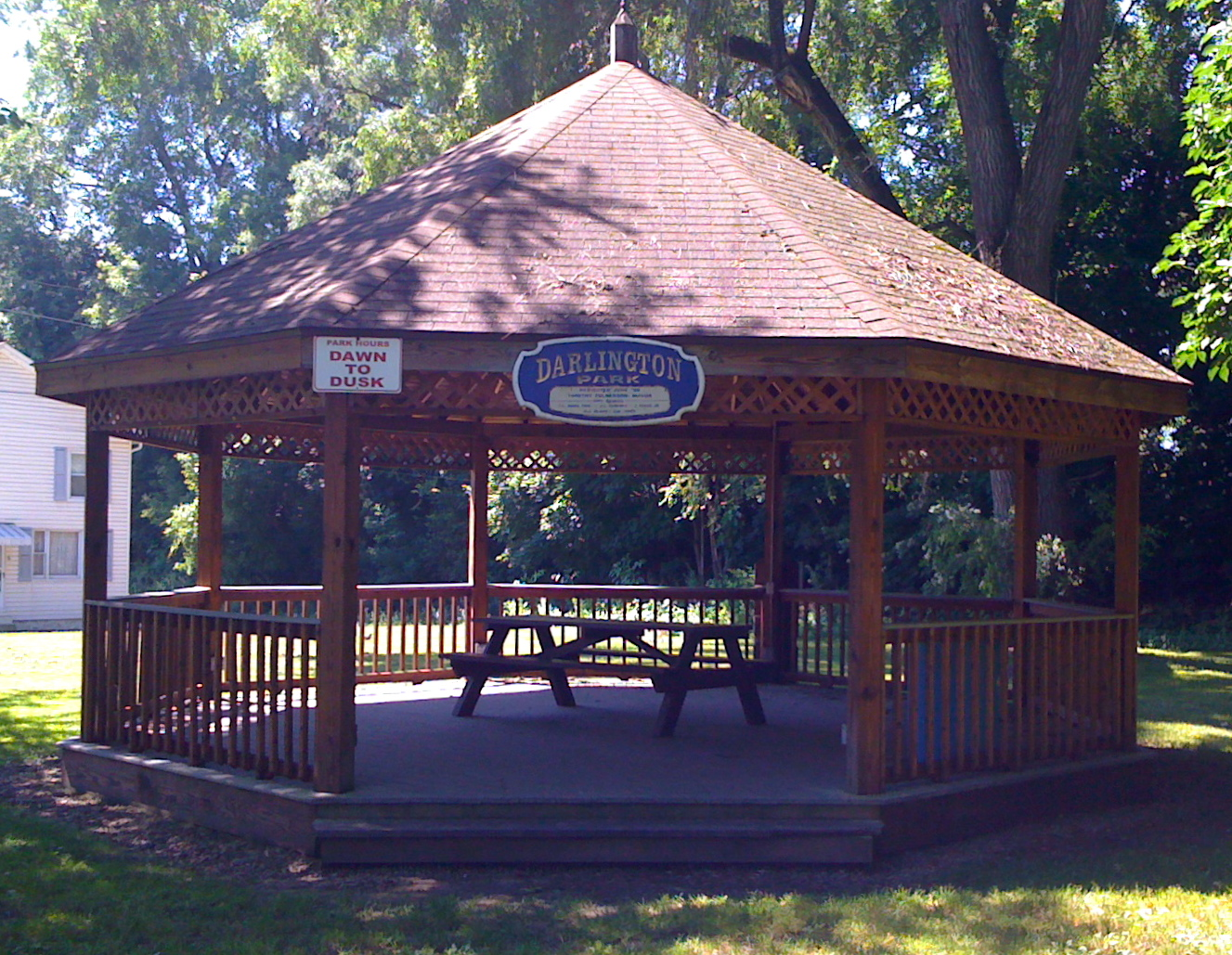
Gazebo in Darlington Park

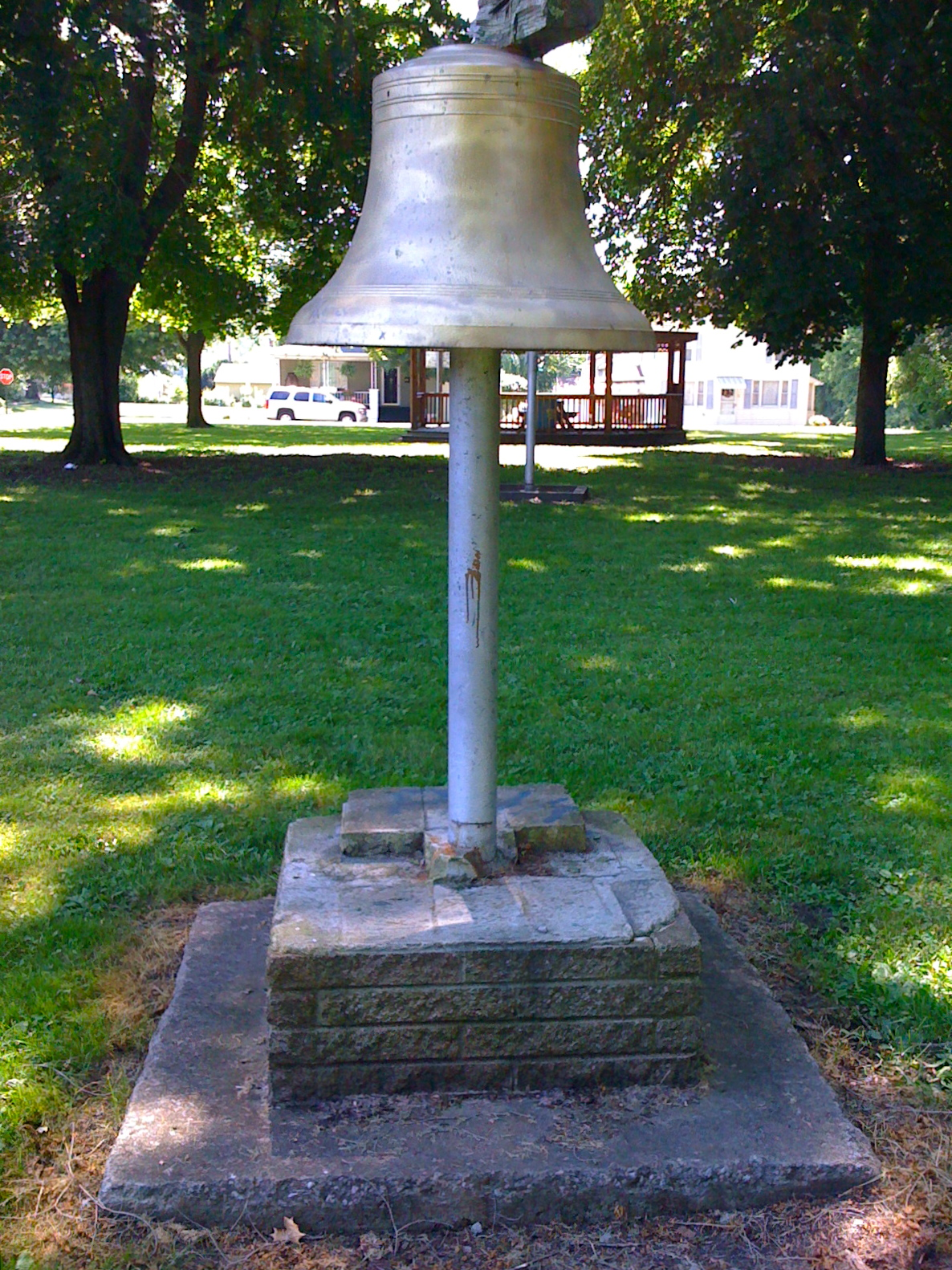
Bell in Darlington Park

== History ==
William Simpson, from Butler County, was the first settler to arrive in Mahoningtown. Arriving in 1836, he is credited with opening Mahoningtown's first store. That same year, Pittsburgh residents Benjamin Darlington and William Hayes laid out the town on five hundred acres of property they owned. In 1844, a general store was opened by Archibald Newell, who came to Mahoningtown from Crawford County. Mahoningtown's first postmaster was John Gillespie.

In 1899 Mahoningtown a Grazio Forgione worked there for four years as a migrant worker from Italy. This helped finance the studies of a young Saint Padre Pio, (then named Francesco Forgione) into the Franciscan Order where he adopted the name Pio.

The employment this town gave migrant Italians, enabled a famous 20th century saint of the Catholic Church to finance his novitiate. The family name of the employer was Myers with Pio's father living in Montgomery Avenue.

== Transportation and access ==
Routes 18 and 108 pass through Mahoningtown, while U.S. Route 422 passes over the city on the New Castle Bypass.
