= Big Beaver Falls Area School District =

School district in Pennsylvania

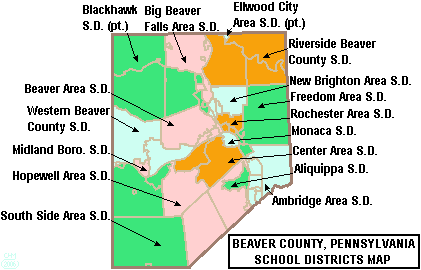

Address
- 1503 Eighth Avenue Beaver Falls, Pennsylvania, 15010; United States
- Coordinates: 40.757081°N 80.3211225°W

District information
- Type: Public
- Motto: Once a Tiger, Always a Tiger
- Grades: Pre-Kindergarten-12
- Established: 1867
- Schools: 4 total: Beaver Falls High School; Beaver Falls Middle School; Big Beaver Elementary School; Central Elementary School
- NCES District ID: 4203630

Students and staff
- District mascot: Tigers
- Colors: Orange; Black

Other information
- Website: www.tigerweb.org

The Big Beaver Falls Area School District is a midsized, suburban public school district in Beaver County, Pennsylvania, United States. It serves the City of Beaver Falls, the Boroughs of Big Beaver, Eastvale, Homewood, Koppel and New Galilee and White Township. The district encompasses approximately 22 square miles (57 km^{2}). According to 2000 federal census data, it serves a resident population of 15,260 people. In 2009, the district residents’ per capita income was $14,937, while the median family income was $33,942. In the Commonwealth, the median family income was $49,501 and the United States median family income was $49,445, in 2010.

The district operates: two elementary schools, a middle school and a high school.

== Schools ==
- Big Beaver Elementary School (K–5th)
- Central Elementary School (K–5th)
- Beaver Falls Middle School (6th–8th)
- Beaver Falls High School (9th–12th)

== Extracurriculars ==
The district offers a variety of clubs, activities and sports.

=== Athletics ===
The main mascot for the district athletic teams is the Tiger and their colors are orange and black. Big Beaver Falls Area is a PIAA District 7 school, and most sports compete in the Class AA division level (with the exception of golf, which competes in the Class AAAA level).

The Tigers compete in the following sports:

- Men's football- 2016-2017 PIAA state champions
- Men's golf
- Men's cross country
- Men's basketball - PIAA state champions in 1970, 1994, 2005, 2013
- Men's baseball
- Men's swimming and diving
- Men's and women's track and field
- Men's and women's bowling-(started in 2007)
- Women's volleyball
- Women's tennis
- Women's cross country
- Women's basketball
- Women's softball
- Women's swimming and diving
