= Eckles Run =

River in Pennsylvania

Eckles Run Tributary to Beaver River
- Location of Eckles Run mouth Eckles Run (the United States)

Location
- Country: United States of America
- State: Pennsylvania
- County: Lawrence

Physical characteristics
- Source: divide between Eckles Run and North Fork Little Beaver Creek
  - location: about 0.5 miles west of Coverdale, Pennsylvania
  - coordinates: 40°52′40″N 080°22′39″W
  - elevation: 1,120 ft (340 m)
- Mouth: Beaver River
  - location: Wampum, Pennsylvania
  - coordinates: 40°53′36″N 080°20′25″W
  - elevation: 740 ft (230 m)
- Length: 3.18 mi (5.12 km)
- Basin size: 3.03 square miles (7.8 km^{2})
- Discharge
  - average: 3.41 cu ft/s (0.097 m^{3}/s) at mouth with Beaver River

Basin features
- Progression: Beaver River → Ohio River → Mississippi River → Gulf of Mexico
- River system: Beaver River
- Tributaries
  - left: unnamed tributaries
  - right: unnamed tributaries

Eckles Run is a tributary of the Beaver River in western Pennsylvania. The stream rises in south-central Lawrence County and flows east entering the Beaver River at Wampum, Pennsylvania. The watershed is roughly 35% agricultural, 54% forested and the rest is other uses. This is the only stream of this name in the United States.
