= Bennett Run (Beaver River tributary) =

River in Pennsylvania

Bennett Run Tributary to Beaver River
- Location of Bennett Run mouth Bennett Run (Beaver River tributary) (the United States)

Location
- Country: United States of America
- State: Pennsylvania
- County: Beaver

Physical characteristics
- Source: divide between Bennett Run and Brush Run
  - location: about 2 miles northeast of Beaver Falls, Pennsylvania
  - coordinates: 40°47′37″N 080°16′59″W
  - elevation: 1,080 ft (330 m)
- Mouth: Beaver River
  - location: Beaver Falls, Pennsylvania (across from)
  - coordinates: 40°46′45″N 080°19′07″W
  - elevation: 730 ft (220 m)
- Length: 2.14 mi (3.44 km)
- Basin size: 2.99 square miles (7.7 km^{2})
- Discharge
  - average: 3.11 cu ft/s (0.088 m^{3}/s) at mouth with Beaver River

Basin features
- Progression: Beaver River → Ohio River → Mississippi River → Gulf of Mexico
- River system: Beaver River
- Tributaries
  - left: unnamed tributaries
  - right: unnamed tributaries

Bennett Run is a tributary of the Beaver River in western Pennsylvania. The stream rises in north-central Beaver County then flows southwest entering the Beaver River at Morado, Pennsylvania. The watershed is roughly 25% agricultural, 53% forested and the rest is other uses.

== See also ==
- List of rivers of Pennsylvania
