= William V. McBride =

United States Air Force general (1922–2022)

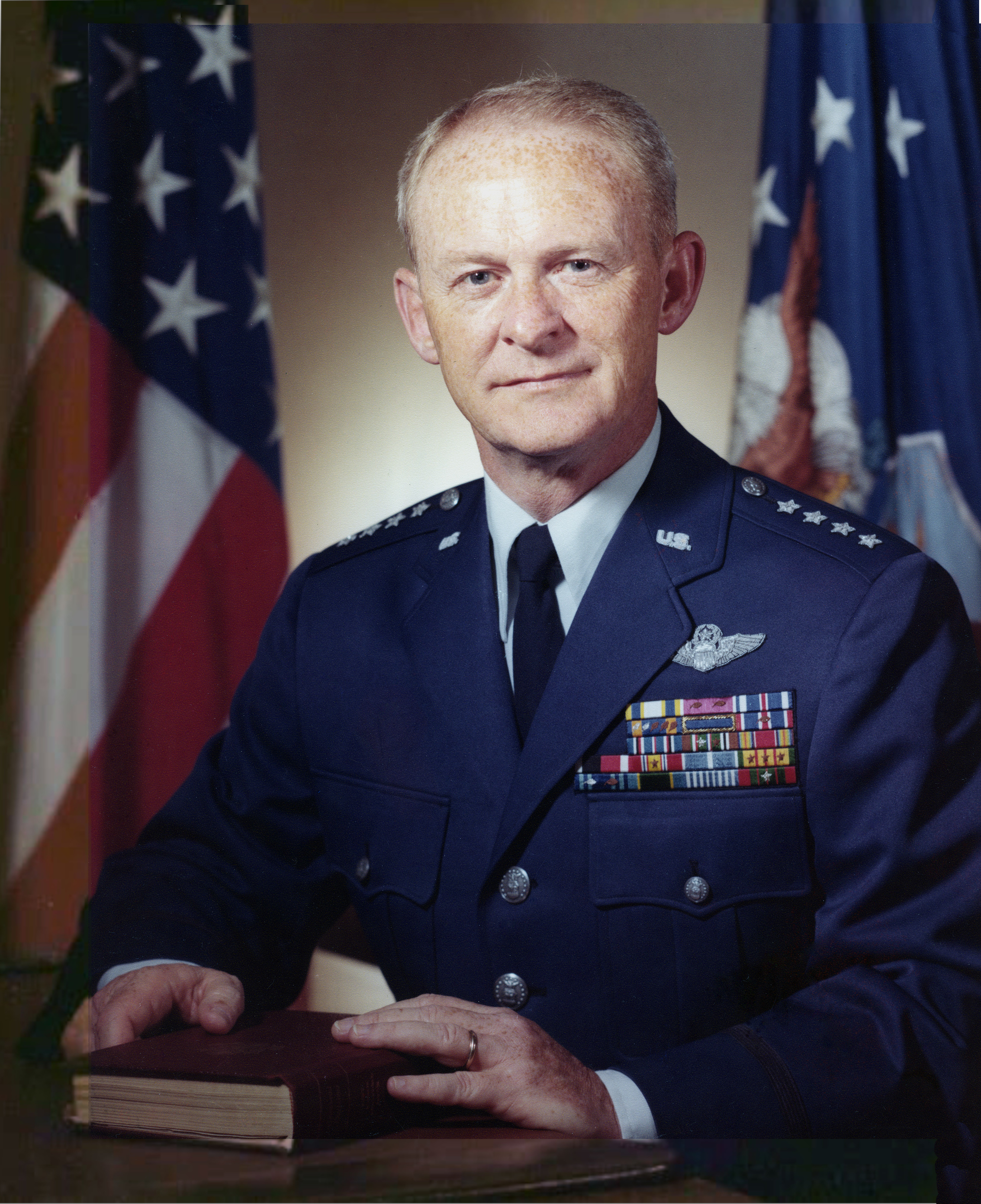
- McBride in a 1974 official portrait
- Born: May 25, 1922; Wampum, Pennsylvania, U.S.
- Died: August 26, 2022 (aged 100)
- Military career
- Allegiance: United States
- Branch: United States Air Force
- Service years: 1943–1978
- Rank: General
- Commands: Second Air Rescue Group; Eighth Air Rescue Group; 1608th Air Transport Group; 437th Military Airlift Wing; Deputy Chief of Staff of the Materiel Headquarters Military Airlift Command; Deputy Chief of Staff of Operations Headquarters Military Airlift Command; Chief of Staff of the Military Airlift Command; Vice Commander in Chief of the United States Air Forces in Europe; Air Training Command; Air Force Logistics Command; Vice Chief of Staff of the United States Air Force
- Conflicts: World War II; Korean War; Cold War; Vietnam War

William Vincent McBride (May 25, 1922 – August 26, 2022) was a general in the United States Air Force who served as Vice Chief of Staff of the United States Air Force from 1975 to 1978.

== Biography ==
=== Early life ===
McBride was born in Wampum, Pennsylvania, in 1922, the son of Ray and Iva McBride. He received his high school education from Wampum High School in 1939. He later attended Garfield Business Institute, Beaver Falls, Pennsylvania.

McBride enlisted in the United States Army Air Corps in 1942 and entered aviation cadet training. He completed navigation training at the Pan American Airways Navigation School, Coral Gables, Florida, and graduated as a second lieutenant. He next attended bombardier school in Carlsbad, New Mexico, and in March 1943 entered combat crew training as a navigator-bombardier in Martin B-26 Marauder aircraft at MacDill Field, Florida.

=== Early career ===
In July 1943 he joined the 387th Bombardment Group in the European Theater of Operations as squadron navigator and later served as group navigator. He helped plan and flew on many of the important missions in support of the Allied ground forces offensive, including D-Day operations.

After World War II, he trained new navigators at Ellington Field, Texas, and then was assigned to Lackland Army Air Field, Texas, to help organize the present Air Force basic training base. He attended basic and advanced pilot training at Randolph Air Force Base, Texas, and Barksdale Air Force Base, Louisiana in 1947–1948 to become a triple-rated officer. In 1950 he attended New York University in New York City.

Since that time, many of his military assignments were in the Military Airlift Command in weather reconnaissance, air rescue and airlift functions.

During the Korean War, he commanded the Second Air Rescue Group in Okinawa and in the Philippines. After a tour of duty in Headquarters Air Rescue Service as deputy chief of staff for plans, he commanded the Eighth Air Rescue Group at Stead Air Force Base, Nevada, during 1956–1957. He then commanded the 1608th Air Transport Group at Charleston Air Force Base, South Carolina The group was responsible for providing airlift to Africa, the Middle East and Latin America.

In 1959, General McBride was assigned as a student to the National War College in Washington D.C., and in early 1960, as a member of a small official group of National War College students, visited Moscow and toured points of interest in the Soviet Union.

=== Later career ===
In July 1960, he was assigned to Headquarters United States Air Force, Directorate of Plans, to work on problems related to counterinsurgency and special warfare. He served first as assistant chief of the Cold War Division and later as chief of the Special Warfare Division.

In June 1964, he was selected by Secretary of the Air Force Eugene M. Zuckert to become his military assistant. When Secretary Harold Brown replaced Mr. Zuckert in October 1965, McBride remained as the military assistant where he was called on to advise and assist the secretary and undersecretary on operational, planning and programming matters.

McBride was assigned as commander of the 437th Military Airlift Wing, Charleston Air Force Base, South Carolina, in August 1966. McBride was assigned to Headquarters Military Airlift Command in March 1969 as deputy chief of staff, materiel; he became deputy chief of staff, operations, in September 1969; and chief of staff, Military Airlift Command, in March 1970.

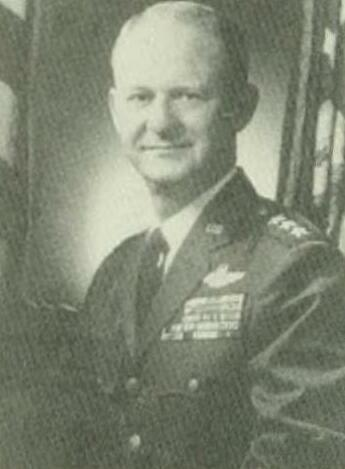
Lt. Gen William V. McBride, Commander of Air Training Command

McBride was assigned as vice commander in chief, United States Air Forces in Europe, with headquarters at Lindsey Air Station, Wiesbaden, Germany, in September 1971. He assumed command of Air Training Command in September 1972, and became commander of the Air Force Logistics Command in September 1974.

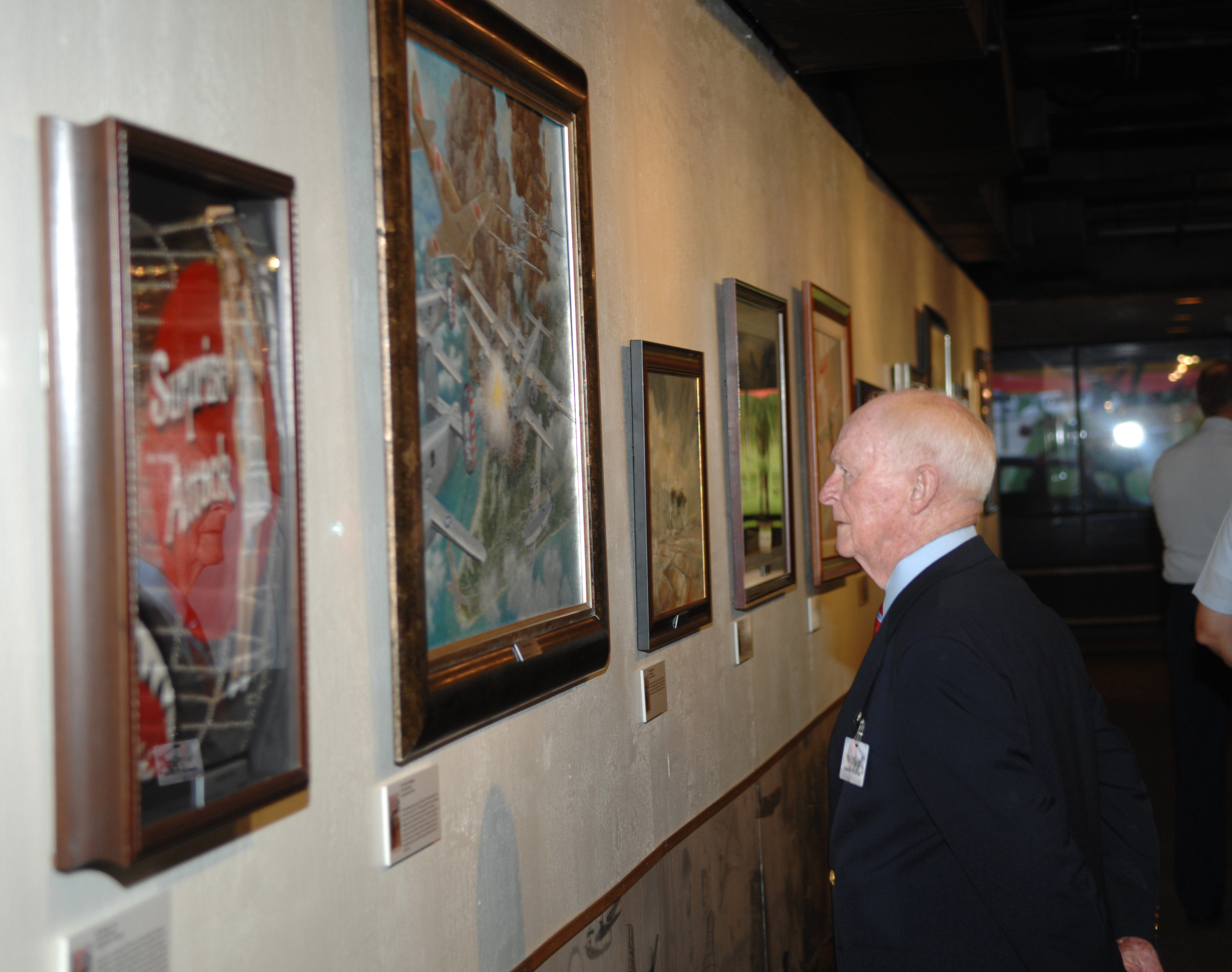
McBride in San Antonio, Texas in 2007.

McBride was appointed Vice Chief of Staff of the United States Air Force on September 1, 1975. He was promoted to the grade of general effective September 1, 1974, with same date of rank. He retired on March 31, 1978.

McBride was married to Katherine Adeline Solsberg for 76 years before her death in 2021. He lived in San Antonio, Texas. He turned 100 on May 25, 2022, and died on August 26.

== Awards ==
Awards earned over his career include:

- Air Force Distinguished Service Medal with two oak leaf clusters
- Legion of Merit with two oak leaf clusters
- Distinguished Flying Cross
- Air Medal with thirteen oak leaf clusters
- Presidential Unit Citation emblem
- Air Force Outstanding Unit Award ribbon with an oak leaf cluster
- French Croix de Guerre with gold palm
- Command pilot and navigator

== Effective dates of promotion ==
Insignia	Rank	Date
	General	September 1, 1974
	Lieutenant general	September 1, 1971
	Major general	March 1, 1969
	Brigadier general	November 30, 1965
	Colonel	June 15, 1954
	Lieutenant colonel	February 20, 1951
	Major	May 16, 1945
	Captain	June 10, 1944
	First lieutenant	December 13, 1943
	Second lieutenant	January 30, 1943
