= Stockman Run =

River in Pennsylvania

Stockman Run Tributary to Beaver River
- Location of Stockman Run mouth Stockman Run (the United States)

Location
- Country: United States of America
- State: Pennsylvania
- County: Beaver

Physical characteristics
- Source: divide between Stockman Run and North Fork Little Beaver Creek
  - location: about 2 miles west of Koppel, Pennsylvania
  - coordinates: 40°50′15″N 080°21′55″W
  - elevation: 1,160 ft (350 m)
- Mouth: Beaver River
  - location: Koppel, Pennsylvania
  - coordinates: 40°49′46″N 080°18′43″W
  - elevation: 735 ft (224 m)
- Length: 3.49 mi (5.62 km)
- Basin size: 2.55 square miles (6.6 km^{2})
- Discharge
  - average: 2.78 cu ft/s (0.079 m^{3}/s) at mouth with Beaver River

Basin features
- Progression: Beaver River → Ohio River → Mississippi River → Gulf of Mexico
- River system: Beaver River
- Tributaries
  - left: unnamed tributaries
  - right: unnamed tributaries

Stockman Run is a tributary of the Beaver River in western Pennsylvania. The stream rises in north-central Beaver County and flows generally east entering the Beaver River at Koppel, Pennsylvania. The watershed is roughly 16% agricultural, 70% forested and the rest is other uses.
