= McKee Run (Beaver River tributary) =

River in Pennsylvania

McKee Run Tributary to Beaver River
- Location of McKee Run mouth McKee Run (Beaver River tributary) (the United States)

Location
- Country: United States of America
- State: Pennsylvania
- County: Lawrence

Physical characteristics
- Source: divide between McKee Run and Slippery Rock Creek
  - location: about 0.5 miles northwest of Castlewood, Pennsylvania
  - coordinates: 40°55′48″N 080°16′56″W
  - elevation: 1,260 ft (380 m)
- Mouth: Beaver River
  - location: West Pittsburg, Pennsylvania
  - coordinates: 40°56′22″N 080°22′15″W
  - elevation: 760 ft (230 m)
- Length: 5.34 mi (8.59 km)
- Basin size: 6.35 square miles (16.4 km^{2})
- Discharge
  - average: 7.41 cu ft/s (0.210 m^{3}/s) at mouth with Beaver River

Basin features
- Progression: west
- River system: Beaver River
- Tributaries
  - left: unnamed tributaries
  - right: unnamed tributaries

McKee Run is a tributary of the Beaver River in western Pennsylvania. The stream rises in south-central Lawrence County and flows west entering the Beaver River at West Pittsburg, Pennsylvania. The watershed is roughly 29% agricultural, 62% forested and the rest is other uses.

== See also ==
- List of rivers of Pennsylvania
