= Wampum, Pennsylvania =

Borough in Pennsylvania, US

- Borough
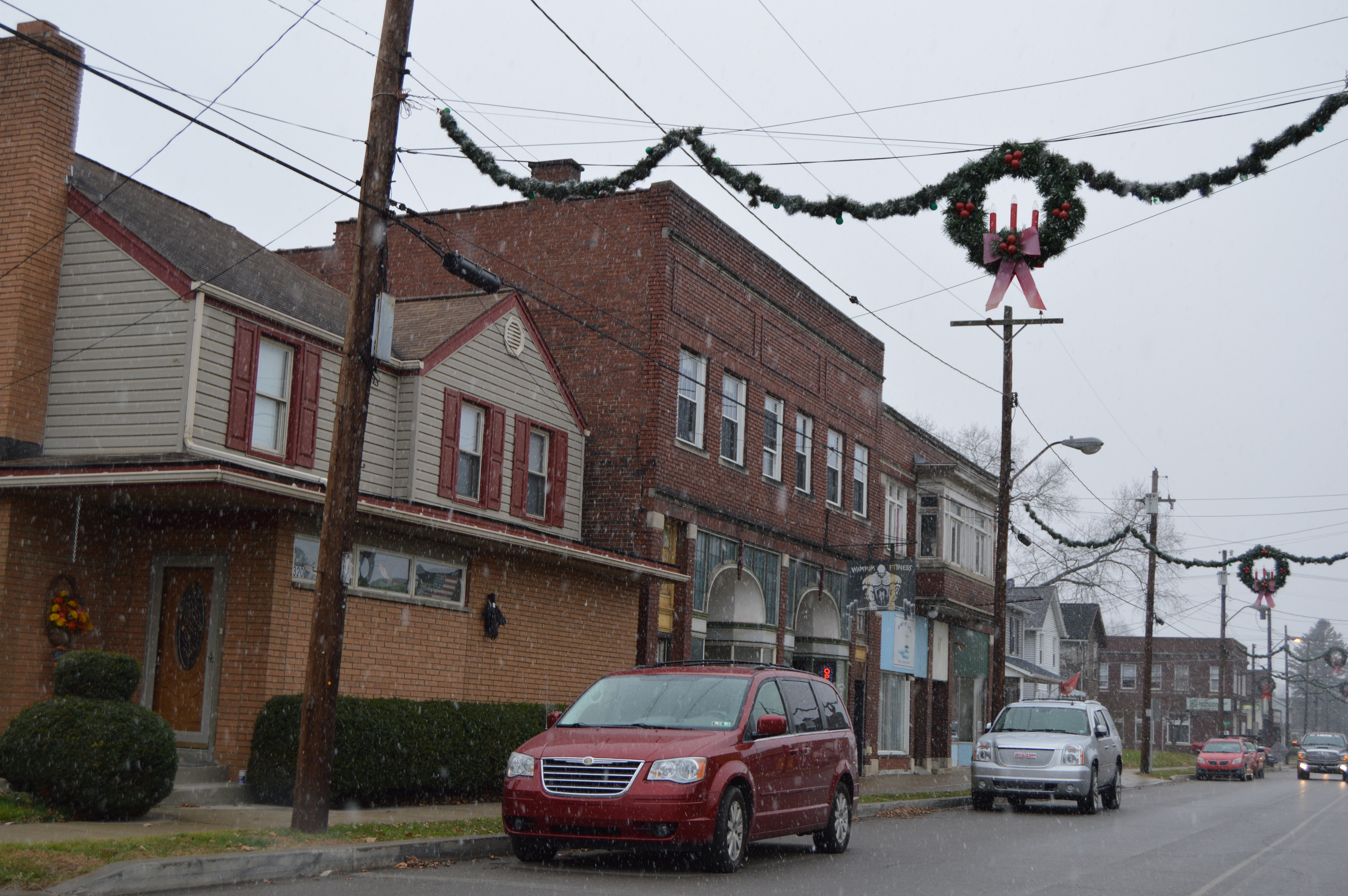
- Businesses on Main Street

- Location in Lawrence County, Pennsylvania
- Coordinates: 40°53′19″N 80°20′23″W
- Country: United States
- State: Pennsylvania
- County: Lawrence
- Established: 1796
- Incorporated: 1876

Government
  - Mayor: Brooke Fuller

Area
  - Total: 1.03 sq mi (2.67 km^{2})
  - Land: 0.98 sq mi (2.55 km^{2})
  - Water: 0.046 sq mi (0.12 km^{2})
- Elevation (middle of borough): 860 ft (260 m)
- Highest elevation (southwest corner of borough): 1,160 ft (350 m)
- Lowest elevation (Beaver River): 740 ft (230 m)

Population (2020)
  - Total: 557 ▼
  - Estimate (2021): 552
  - Density: 668.3/sq mi (258.04/km^{2})
- Time zone: UTC-4 (EST)
  - Summer (DST): UTC-5 (EDT)
- ZIP code: 16157
- Area codes: 724, 878
- FIPS code: 42-80880
- Website: wampumboro.com

Wampum is a borough in southern Lawrence County, Pennsylvania, United States. The population was 557 at the 2020 census. It is part of the Pittsburgh metropolitan area.

== Geography ==
Wampum is located at 40°53′19″N 80°20′23″W (40.888657, -80.339650). According to the U.S. Census Bureau, the borough has a total area of 1.0 square mile (2.6 km^{2}), of which 0.9 square miles (2.3 km^{2}) is land and 0.04 square miles (0.10 km^{2}), or 4.17%, is water.

Wampum is drained by two tributaries to the Beaver River, including Eckles Run on the north and Wampum Run on the south.

== Demographics ==
Historical population
Census	Pop.	Note	%±
1880	786		—
1890	766		−2.5%
1900	816		6.5%
1910	980		20.1%
1920	882		−10.0%
1930	883		0.1%
1940	1,061		20.2%
1950	1,090		2.7%
1960	1,085		−0.5%
1970	1,189		9.6%
1980	851		−28.4%
1990	666		−21.7%
2000	678		1.8%
2010	717		5.8%
2020	559		−22.0%
2021 (est.)	552	▼	−1.3%

As of the census of 2000, there were 678 people, 290 households, and 182 families residing in the borough. The population density was 736.1 inhabitants per square mile (284.2/km^{2}). There were 310 housing units at an average density of 336.6 per square mile (130.0/km^{2}). The racial makeup of the borough was 97.05% White, 1.77% African American, 0.15% Native American, 0.44% Asian, and 0.59% from two or more ethnicities.

There were 290 households, out of which 24.5% had children under the age of 18 living with them, 49.0% were married couples living together, 10.0% had a female householder with no husband present, and 36.9% were non-families. 34.1% of all households were made up of individuals, and 20.3% had someone living alone who was 65 years of age or older. The average household size was 2.34 and the average family size was 2.99.

In the borough the population was spread out, with 23.0% under the age of 18, 5.6% from 18 to 24, 26.1% from 25 to 44, 22.9% from 45 to 64, and 22.4% who were 65 years of age or older. The median age was 42 years. For every 100 females there were 89.9 males. For every 100 females age 18 and over, there were 87.8 males.

The median income for a household in the borough was $29,205, and the median income for a family was $36,094. Males had a median income of $31,023 versus $26,071 for females. The per capita income for the borough was $15,598. About 11.8% of families and 17.9% of the population were below the poverty line, including 22.9% of those under age 18 and 13.9% of those age 65 or over.

== Education ==
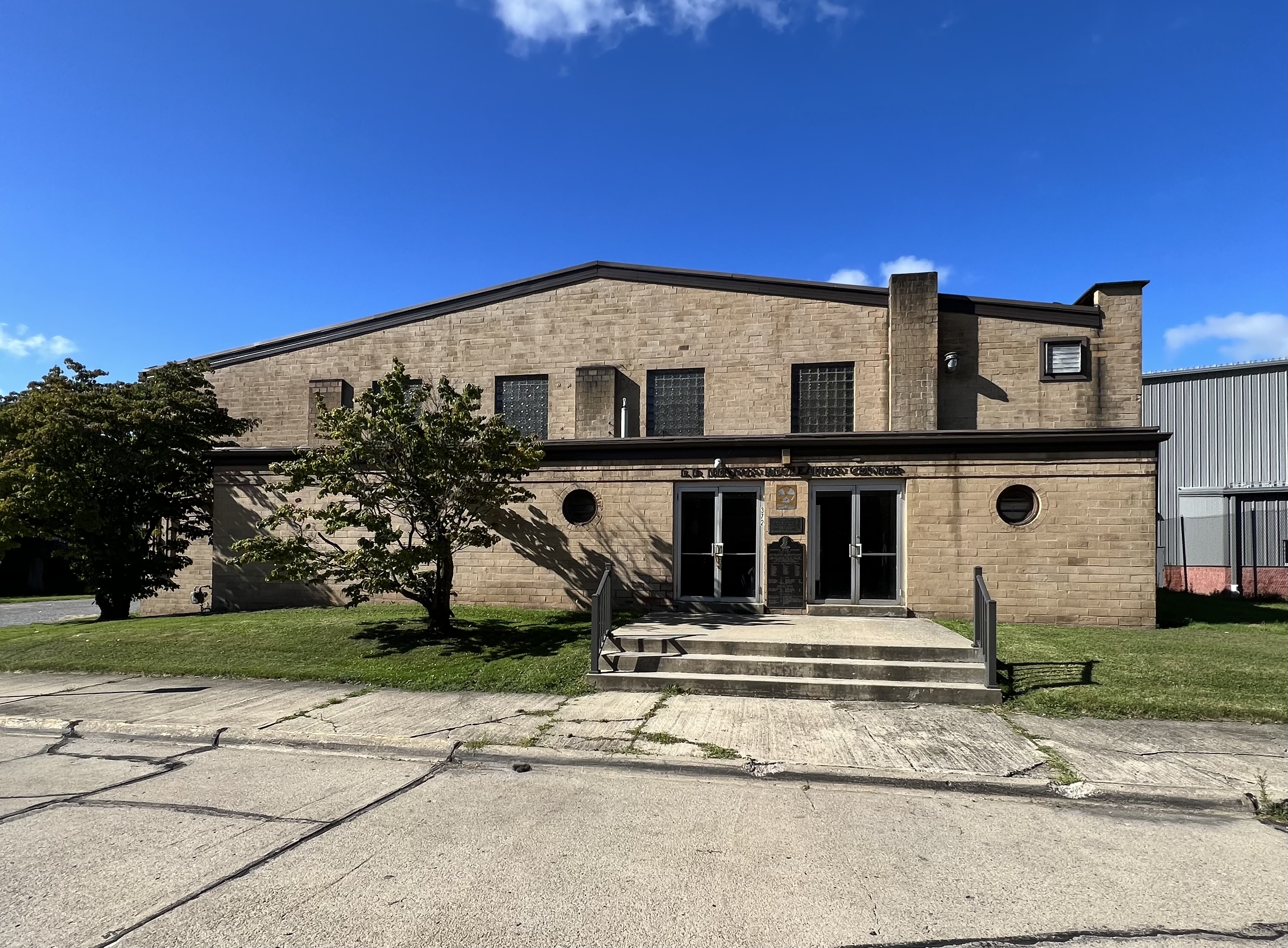
Former Wampum High School located on Main Street Extension

Wampum had its own school district called Wampum Public Schools from 1914 to 1962. The district also included students from nearby Chewton and, after 1954, New Beaver. Since 1962, children in Wampum proper and Chewton have attended Ellwood City Area School District, which is considered the legal successor to Wampum Public Schools due to state-mandated school consolidation in the 1960s.

Due to a dispute with the former Big Beaver Township School District that had an informal union with Wampum Public Schools but never fully merged with Wampum, children in New Beaver have attended Big Beaver's successor Mohawk Area School District since Ellwood City absorbed Wampum Public Schools.

Wampum High School was home to the Wampum Indians. L Butler Hennon coached the team from 1933-1961. The Wampum Indians all-time record stood at 521-126 (.805). The Wampum Indians won the sectional title 16 times, three state championships (1955, 1959, 1960) and a record setting 82 consecutive games between 1953-1959.

== Transportation ==
=== Major roads and highways ===
- PA 18
- PA 288

== Notable people ==
- Dick Allen, Hall of Fame Major League Baseball player
- Hank Allen, Major League Baseball player
- Ron Allen, Major League Baseball player
- Don Hennon, basketball player and surgeon
- Stephen Johns, National Hockey League player for the Dallas Stars
- William V. McBride, former United States Air Force general

== In popular culture ==
The town was mentioned in the 1986 film Platoon by Chris Taylor, a character played by Charlie Sheen.
