= Winona, Ohio =

Winona
- Unincorporated community
- Location within Ohio Location within the United States
- Coordinates: 40°49′41″N 80°53′46″W
- Country: United States
- State: Ohio
- County: Columbiana
- Elevation: 1,194 ft (364 m)
- Time zone: UTC-5 (Eastern (EST))
  - Summer (DST): UTC-4 (EDT)
- ZIP code: 44493
- Area codes: 330, 234
- GNIS Feature ID: 1049336

Winona is an unincorporated community in southeastern Butler Township, Columbiana County, Ohio, United States. It has a post office with the ZIP code 44493.

== History ==
A post office called Winona has been in operation since 1868. The community was named after the character Wenonah in the 1855 epic poem The Song of Hiawatha by Henry Wadsworth Longfellow. In 1879, Winona had a store, sawmill, gristmill, blacksmith shop, meeting house, carriage shop, shoe shop, fruit nursery, and 45 dwellings.

== Notable people ==
- Barclay and Edwin Coppock, participants in John Brown's raid on Harpers Ferry
