= Wallace Run (Beaver River tributary) =

River in Pennsylvania

Wallace Run Tributary to Beaver River
- Location of Wallace Run mouth Wallace Run (Beaver River tributary) (the United States)

Location
- Country: United States of America
- State: Pennsylvania
- County: Beaver

Physical characteristics
- Source: divide between Wallace Run and North Fork Little Beaver Creek
  - location: about 2 miles southeast of Darlington, Pennsylvania
  - coordinates: 40°48′19″N 080°23′05″W
  - elevation: 1,150 ft (350 m)
- Mouth: Beaver River
  - location: Morado, Pennsylvania
  - coordinates: 40°47′25″N 080°19′47″W
  - elevation: 730 ft (220 m)
- Length: 3.45 mi (5.55 km)
- Basin size: 4.70 square miles (12.2 km^{2})
- Discharge
  - average: 4.99 cu ft/s (0.141 m^{3}/s) at mouth with Beaver River

Basin features
- Progression: Beaver River → Ohio River → Mississippi River → Gulf of Mexico
- River system: Beaver River
- Tributaries
  - left: unnamed tributaries
  - right: unnamed tributaries

Wallace Run is a tributary of the Beaver River in western Pennsylvania. The stream rises in north-central Beaver County then flows east entering the Beaver River at Morado, Pennsylvania. The watershed is roughly 23% agricultural, 48% forested and the rest is other uses.
