= Beaver Falls High School =

Coordinates: 40.7591°N 80.3219°W

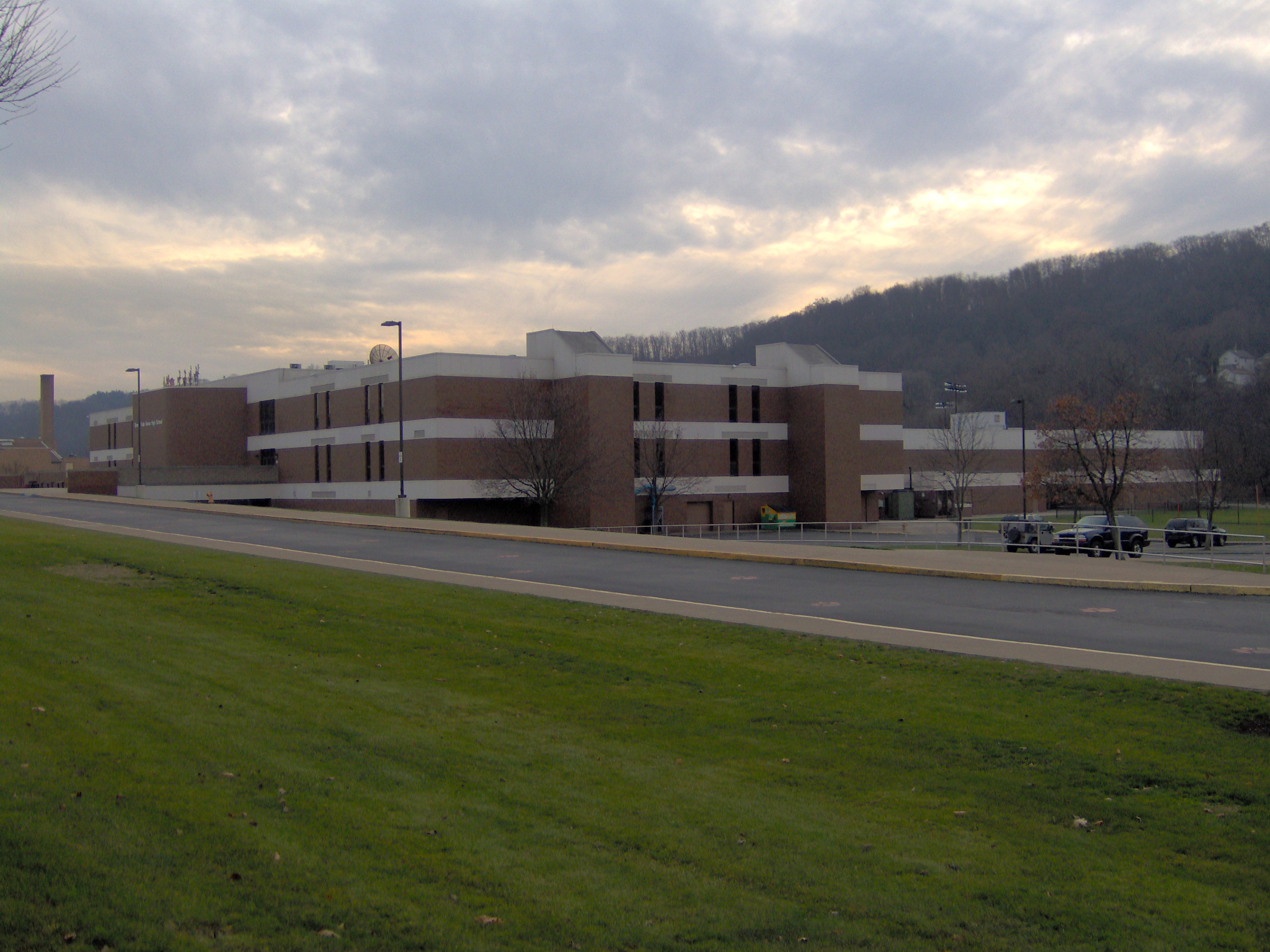
- Beaver Falls High School in November 2006

Location
- 1701 8th Avenue; Beaver Falls, Beaver County, Pennsylvania 15010; United States

Information
- Type: Public high school
- Motto: "Once a Tiger, Always a Tiger"
- School district: Big Beaver Falls Area School District
- Principal: Douglass Rowe
- Grades: 9–12
- Enrollment: 480 (2023-2024)
- Student to teacher ratio: 15.09
- Campus type: Large Suburb
- Colors: Orange and Black
- Athletics conference: Western Pennsylvania Interscholastic Athletic League
- Team name: Tigers
- Rival: Aliquippa Junior/Senior High School; New Brighton High School
- Website: www.tigerweb.org/domain/11

Beaver Falls High School is a public high school in Beaver Falls, Pennsylvania, United States. It is the only high school in the Big Beaver Falls Area School District. Athletic teams compete as the Beaver Falls Tigers in the Western Pennsylvania Interscholastic Athletic League.

== Extracurriculars ==
The district offers a wide variety of after school clubs, activities and sports.

The Tigers' two main athletic rivals are the New Brighton Lions, who they play football against each season for the 'Little Brown Jug', a trophy that the winner gets to takes home to their high school, and the Aliquippa Quips, whom of which are played every season as well.

=== Athletics ===
- Men's Football
- Men's Cross Country
- Men's Basketball - PIAA state champions in 1970, 1994, 2005, 2013 [28]
- Men's Baseball
- Men's Swimming and Diving
- Men's and Women's Track and Field
- Men's and Women's Bowling-(started in 2007)
- Women's Volleyball
- Women's Tennis
- Women's Cross Country
- Women's Basketball
- Women's Softball
- Women's Swimming and Diving

== Notable alumni ==
- Dwight Collins, former professional football player, Minnesota Vikings
- Joe Lonnett, former professional baseball player, Philadelphia Phillies, and professional manager, Chicago White Sox, Oakland Athletics, and Pittsburgh Pirates
- Jim E. Marshall, former Pennsylvania State Representative for the 14th district
- Jake McCandless, former head college football and basketball coach, Princeton Tigers
- Jim Mutscheller, former professional football player, Baltimore Colts
- Joe Namath, former professional football player, New York Jets and Los Angeles Rams and Pro Football Hall of Fame inductee
- Candy Young, national high school record holder in 100 metres hurdles
