= Debra Todd =

American judge (born 1957)

Chief Justice of the Pennsylvania Supreme Court
- Incumbent
- Assumed office October 1, 2022
- Preceded by: Max Baer

Justice of the Pennsylvania Supreme Court
- Incumbent
- Assumed office January 7, 2008
- Preceded by: Cynthia Baldwin

Judge of the Superior Court of Pennsylvania
- In office January 2, 2000 – December 31, 2007
- Succeeded by: John M. Cleland

Personal details
- Born: Debra McCloskey; October 15, 1957 (age 68) Ellwood City, Pennsylvania, U.S.
- Party: Democratic
- Education: Chatham University (BA); University of Pittsburgh (JD); University of Virginia (LLM)

Debra McCloskey Todd (born October 15, 1957) is an American lawyer who serves as the chief justice of the Supreme Court of Pennsylvania. Prior to her election to the Supreme Court in 2007, she served as a judge on the Superior Court of Pennsylvania from 2000 through 2007. She is a member of the Democratic Party.

== Formative years and family ==
Born in Ellwood City, Pennsylvania, on October 15, 1957, as Debra McCloskey, Debra Todd is a daughter of Harry and Blanche McCloskey. She and her sisters, Mary and Nancy, were reared in that Wayne Township borough, which is located in Lawrence County. Their father was a steelworker.

She is married to Stephen K. Todd, a former attorney for the United States Army who retired from the U.S. Army Reserve at the rank of colonel, and who had been an attorney for U.S. Steel for thirty-one years before retiring in 2007 as vice president of law and environmental affairs.

== Education ==
A 1975 graduate of Lincoln High School in Ellwood City, Todd was awarded a Bachelor of Arts degree with honors from Chatham College in 1979, served on the Law Review in 1982 at the University of Pittsburgh School of Law in Pittsburgh, Pennsylvania, where she earned her Juris Doctor that same year, and was then awarded a Master of Laws from the University of Virginia School of Law in 2004.

== Legal career ==
Todd worked in private practice from 1982 to 1999. During the fall of 1999, she ran for, and was elected to the position of, judge on the Superior Court of Pennsylvania, serving from January 17, 2000, to December 31, 2007. She was elected to the Supreme Court of Pennsylvania in 2007.

On May 19, 2017, Todd delivered the Charles Widger School of Law’s 2017 Commencement Address at Villanova University, and was also awarded the Villanova Law Medallion Award in recognition of her achievements.

On October 1, 2022, she became the first female chief justice of the state Supreme Court, replacing Max Baer who died a day earlier. Roughly three weeks later, she issued her first major letter to Pennsylvania attorneys, in which she urged them to support pro bono legal work across the Commonwealth of Pennsylvania.

=== Publications ===
Todd's list of publications includes:

- Report and Recommendations of the Pennsylvania Supreme Court Elder Law Task Force (Chair), 2014
- “Sentencing of Adult Offenders in Crimes Involving the Sexual Abuse of Children, Too Little, Too Late? A View from the Pennsylvania Bench.” 109 Penn State Law Review 487, 2004

== Awards and honors ==
Todd has been the recipient of the following awards:

- Susan B. Anthony Award for promoting equality in the legal profession, Women’s Bar Association of Western Pennsylvania, 2017
- Visionary Award in recognition of an individual who has made a significant impact in the lives of survivors of sexual violence, Pittsburgh Action Against Rape, 2016
- Judge Robert E. Dauer Award for Judicial Leadership and Excellence, Amen Corner, 2015
- 225th Anniversary Medallion recognizing alumni who have built better lives through their life’s work, University of Pittsburgh, 2013
- Marjorie Matson Woman of the Year Award, Women's Association, University of Pittsburgh School of Law, 2013
- Tribute to Women Leadership Award in Business & Professional Services, Greater Pittsburgh YWCA, 2013
- Distinguished Alumni Award, University of Pittsburgh Law Alumni Association, 2012
- Philip Werner Amram Award for Professional Excellence, Allegheny County Bar Association, 2010
- Cornerstone Award for Law, Chatham University, 2009
- Honorary Doctorate in Public Service, Chatham University, 2008
- Celebrate & Share Women of Achievement Award, 2008
- Woman of the Year Award, The Legal Intelligencer Women in the Profession, 2007-2008
- Woman of the Year, Pennsylvania Federation of Democratic Women, 2007

Legal offices
Preceded by Cynthia Baldwin	Justice of the Pennsylvania Supreme Court; 2008–present	Incumbent
Preceded by Max Baer	Chief Justice of the Pennsylvania Supreme Court; 2022–present	Incumbent
