= Mark Mangino =

American football coach (born 1956)

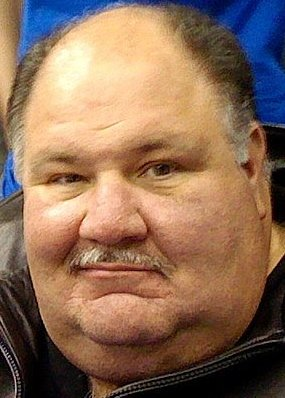
- Mangino in 2007

Biographical details
- Born: August 26, 1956 (age 70); New Castle, Pennsylvania, U.S.
- Education: Youngstown State

Coaching career (HC unless noted)
- 1985–1986: Youngstown State (assistant)
- 1987–1989: Geneva (OC/OL)
- 1990: Lincoln HS (PA)
- 1991–1998: Kansas State (RGC)
- 1999: Oklahoma (OL)
- 2000–2001: Oklahoma (OC)
- 2002–2009: Kansas
- 2013: Youngstown State (AHC/TE)
- 2014–2015: Iowa State (OC/TE)

Head coaching record
- Overall: 50–48 (college)
- Bowls: 3–1

Accomplishments and honors

Awards
- Frank Broyles Award (2000); AFCA Coach of the Year (2007); AP Coach of the Year (2007); Eddie Robinson Coach of the Year (2007); George Munger Award (2007); The Home Depot Coach of the Year Award (2007) Paul "Bear" Bryant Award (2007); Sporting News Coach of the Year (2007); Walter Camp Coach of the Year (2007) Woody Hayes Coach of the Year (2007); Big 12 Coach of the Year (2007)

Mark Thomas Mangino (born August 26, 1956) is a former American college football coach. He served as the head football coach at the University of Kansas from 2002 to 2009. In 2007, Mangino received several national coach of the year honors after leading the Jayhawks to their only 12-win season in school history and an Orange Bowl victory. However, he resigned as coach at Kansas two seasons later following allegations of mistreatment of players. While at Kansas, Mangino coached in four bowl games with a 3–1 record, the lone loss coming in the 2003 Tangerine Bowl. Additionally, in five of his eight seasons at Kansas, the Jayhawks were Bowl eligible; they had been bowl eligible only five times in the previous thirty seasons. He held multiple assistant coaching jobs before becoming the head coach at Kansas, the longest being an eight season stint at Kansas State as their running game coordinator.

== Early life ==
Mangino was born and raised in New Castle, Pennsylvania. After high school, he was offered a football scholarship at Youngstown State. Mangino played semi-pro baseball in western Pennsylvania until he became an EMT. In his late 20s he returned to Youngstown State to complete his studies and earn his degree.

== Coaching career ==
=== Early positions ===
Mangino graduated from Youngstown State University in 1987, serving as an assistant coach there in his last two years under then-head coach Jim Tressel. He also coached at Lincoln High School in Ellwood City, Pennsylvania and at Geneva College, before being hired as an assistant coach at Kansas State University in 1991. Prior to the 1999 season, Mangino left Kansas State to take an assistant position at the University of Oklahoma. While there, he served as the offensive coordinator for the Oklahoma team that beat the defending national champion Florida State Seminoles in the 2000 national championship. Following that season, he was awarded the Frank Broyles Award as the nation's top assistant coach.

=== Kansas ===
Mangino was hired as Kansas' head football coach in December 2001. The program had not posted a winning season in any of the 6 seasons prior to his arrival. In 2003, his second season at KU, Mangino led the Jayhawks to an appearance in the 2003 Tangerine Bowl (now known as the Camping World Bowl). This was the first bowl appearance for Kansas since 1995. In 2005, his fourth season at KU, the team finished the regular season 6–5, to post its first winning record under Mangino, and went on to the Fort Worth Bowl, its second bowl game in three seasons. Among the Jayhawks' wins was a 40–15 victory over Nebraska, breaking a losing streak against the Cornhuskers that had begun in 1969, which was the second-longest such streak of consecutive losses in NCAA history. The same year Mangino also built a defense that ranked 11th nationally (based on yards allowed per game) and featured third-team All-American and Big 12 Conference Defensive Player of the Year linebacker Nick Reid. The 2005 team also ranked 6th nationally in total punts.

In 2007, Mangino led the Jayhawks to arguably the greatest season in school history. The Jayhawks finished with a 12–1 record and a share of the Big 12 North title, rising as high as second in both major polls at one point. Only a loss to then third-ranked Missouri cost the Jayhawks a berth in the Big 12 Championship Game. The Jayhawks won the 2008 Orange Bowl (their first ever BCS appearance, and only the third major-bowl appearance in school history). The 12 wins are a school record for wins in a season; it was only the fourth 10-win season in school history. Mangino's defense was ranked 12th in the nation, and 4th in scoring defense. On the other side of the ball, the Jayhawks finished 2nd in scoring offense.

Following the win against the Iowa State Cyclones, Mangino became the first KU football coach with a winning career record since Jack Mitchell in 1966. Mangino's Jayhawks spent 19 consecutive weeks ranked in the AP and/or USA Today polls (2007–08), won 20 games in a 2-year period for the first time in school history, set home attendance average records in each of the last 4 seasons (2004–2008), tallied KU's first appearance in national polls since 1996 and to the school’s highest ranking ever at #2, produced the top 3 total offense seasons in school history, the top two passing seasons and two of the top three scoring seasons and won three Bowl games—the same number they had won in their entire 102-year football history prior to his arrival.

Mangino's 50 wins are the second-most in school history. He is also the only coach since the end of World War II to leave Kansas with a winning record.

==== 2007 Coach of the Year awards ====
For his accomplishments in 2007, Mangino was named the 2007 National Coach of the Year by the Associated Press, ESPN/ABC, The Sporting News, Football Writers Association, Walter Camp Football Foundation, National Sportscasters and Sportswriters Association, American Football Coaches Association, the Maxwell Football Club (George Munger Award), and he has been named the Woody Hayes National Coach of the Year. He was named the Big 12 Coach of the Year by the Big 12 Coaches and Big 12 Co-Coach of the Year by the Associated Press. Upon winning these Coach of the Year awards, he became the only NCAA coach in history to win both the Frank Broyles Award as the nation's top assistant coach and all the major National Coach of the Year awards.

=== Youngstown State ===
On March 1, 2013, Mangino was hired at his alma mater, Youngstown State, as the team's assistant head coach and tight ends coach.

=== Iowa State ===
On January 6, 2014, Mangino was hired at Iowa State to be the team's offensive coordinator and tight ends coach. In his first season as coach, Mangino returned to Lawrence to face Kansas for the first time since his resignation following the 2009 season, a game the Cyclones lost 14–34. After disagreements about the direction of the offense with head coach Paul Rhoads, Mangino was relieved of his position on October 26, 2015. After Mangino's release, he posted a negative twitter comment that was widely believed to be aimed at the Iowa State program and their defeat at the hands of Kansas State, despite his son Tommy still serving as wide receivers coach for Iowa State.

== Controversies ==
=== Lincoln High controversy ===
After Mangino went 1–9 in his first season as the head coach of Lincoln High School in Ellwood City, Pennsylvania, a group of parents went to the school board and demanded his firing because of his "language, and harsh approach to people". The board elected not to fire Mangino, but he left the school after only one year and did not complete the year as a teacher.

=== High school referee incident ===
On September 21, 2002, Mangino yelled at the officiating crew assigned to the Lawrence High School–Olathe East football game in which Mangino's son, Tommy, was playing. Mangino apparently became angry after referees failed to call what he believed was a late hit on Tommy, the Lawrence High quarterback.

Lawrence High School officials took undisclosed action against Mangino after the game for violating a Kansas High School rule barring abuse of game officials by coaches, players and fans.

=== 2004 Kansas–Texas game ===
In 2004, Mangino paid a $5,000 fine for suggesting that officials acted with favoritism in a questionable offensive pass interference call that affected the outcome of a game against Texas. Mangino implied that money and a BCS berth for the Big 12 Conference influenced the officials to make a call in favor of Texas. He and athletic director Lew Perkins issued public apologies the day after the incident.

=== NCAA penalties and probation ===
In 2005, the University of Kansas self-reported to the NCAA that five major rules violations, including academic fraud, had been committed by some of the football team's student-athletes. In 2006, these major violations, along with four others that has allegedly occurred in other KU sports programs, contributed to the NCAA charging the athletics department displaying a "lack of institutional control". A graduate assistant was found to have supplied answers for some of the correspondence courses taken by some prospective recruits from junior colleges. As a result, the football program's ability to recruit players transferring in from junior college was reduced for two years; and, the program lost two scholarships for each of the 2007 and 2008 seasons.

=== Raimond Pendleton incident ===
During the first game of the 2007 season in which the University of Kansas beat Central Michigan University, KU's Raimond Pendleton ran a CMU punt back 77 yards for a touchdown; but, as he approached the endzone, he slowed down in order to jump into it in a dramatic fashion. The officials threw a penalty flag for "excessive celebration", and gave the Jayhawks a 15-yard "unsportsmanlike conduct" penalty that forced KU to kick off 15 yards closer to their own endzone. When Pendleton returned to the sideline, an irate Mangino took Pendleton aside and gave him an expletive-laden tongue-lashing. The incident was caught on video, and transmitted by local TV stations in the Topeka and Kansas City areas, eventually finding a wider audience after a copy of it was uploaded to YouTube.

=== Internal investigations ===
In November 2009, the recurring issue of Mangino's chronic, alleged misconduct towards his players became the subject of an internal investigation by the University of Kansas Athletic Department. Reportedly, matters came to a head after Mangino grabbed linebacker Arist Wright, yelled at him and poked him in the chest before a game against Colorado. He was formally accused of boorish and violent actions, and several players threatened to transfer after they felt Mangino did not speak to them in a respectful manner. A separate investigation was conducted in 2007, related to Mangino's repeated parking tickets on campus and alleged verbal abuse and negative behavior toward campus staff issuing those tickets.

The Jayhawks regressed significantly in 2009, falling to 5–7. After a prolonged period of negotiations, the university and Mangino's attorneys agreed on a buyout amount that was large enough to secure his quiet resignation in December 2009. Kansas would not win more than three games in a season following Mangino's departure until their 2022 season 13 years later.

== Personal life ==
Mangino and his wife live in his hometown of New Castle, Pennsylvania. His wife was diagnosed with breast cancer in 2011. Mangino lost over 125 lbs between 2012 and 2013.

== Head coaching record ==
=== College ===
Year	Team	Overall	Conference	Standing	Bowl/playoffs	Coaches^{#}	AP^{°}
Kansas Jayhawks (Big 12 Conference) (2002–2009)
2002	Kansas	2–10	0–8	6th North			
2003	Kansas	6–7	3–5	T–4th North	L Tangerine		
2004	Kansas	4–7	2–6	T–5th North			
2005	Kansas	7–5	3–5	5th North	W Fort Worth		
2006	Kansas	6–6	3–5	4th North			
2007	Kansas	12–1	7–1	2nd North	W Orange^{†}	7	7
2008	Kansas	8–5	4–4	3rd North	W Insight		
2009	Kansas	5–7	1–7	6th North			
Kansas:		50–48	23–41				
Total:		50–48					
National championship Conference title Conference division title or championship game berth
^{†}Indicates BCS bowl.; ^{#}Rankings from final Coaches Poll.; ^{°}Rankings from final AP Poll.
