= Ellport, Pennsylvania =

Borough in Pennsylvania, US

- Borough
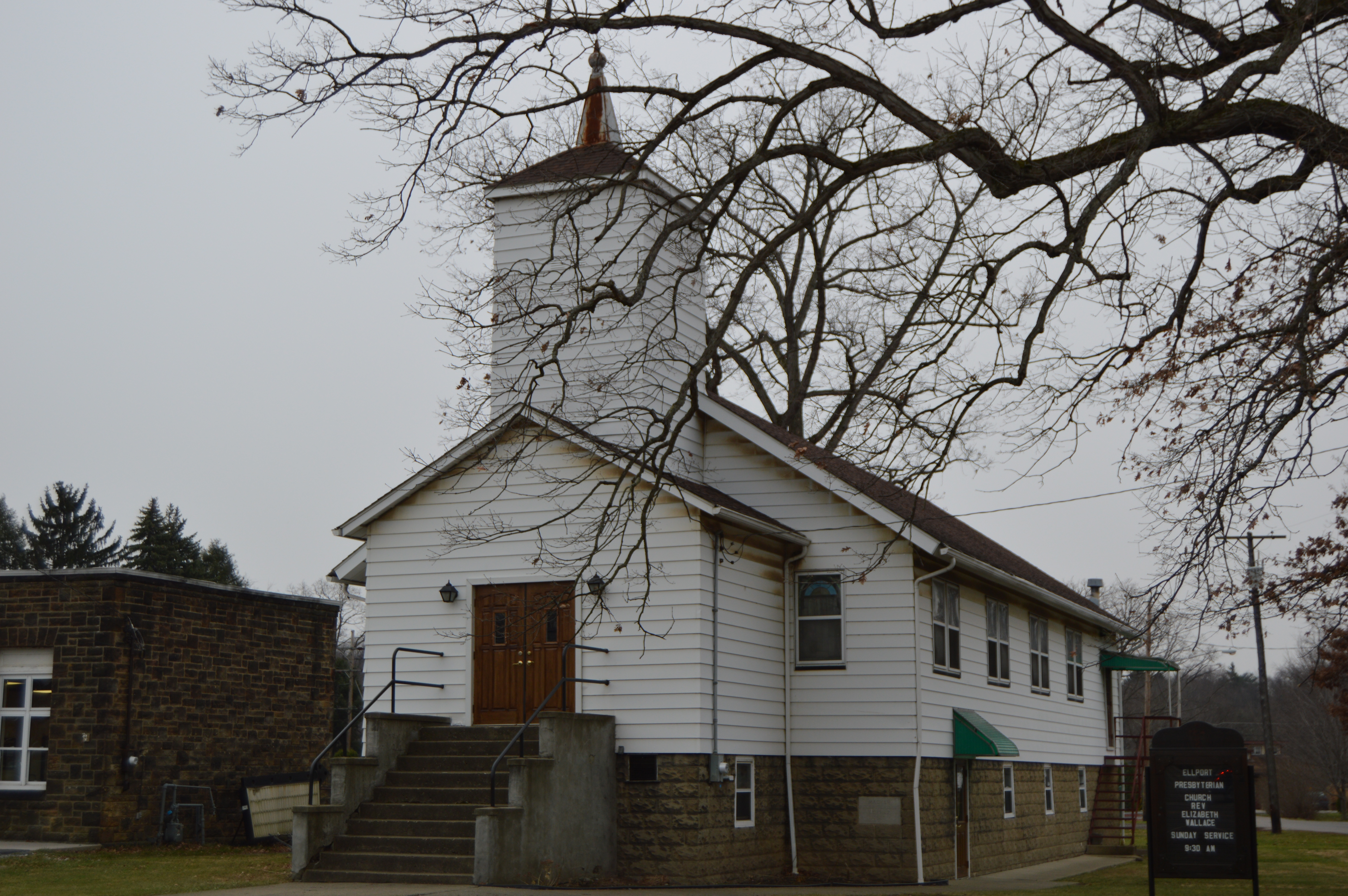
- Ellport Presbyterian Church
- Etymology: Portmanteau of Ellwood City and Portersville
- Location in Lawrence County, Pennsylvania
- Coordinates: 40°51′37″N 80°15′43″W
- Country: United States
- State: Pennsylvania
- County: Lawrence
- Incorporated: February 15th, 1929

Government
  - Mayor: Joe Cisco Jr.

Area
  - Total: 0.46 sq mi (1.20 km^{2})
  - Land: 0.43 sq mi (1.11 km^{2})
  - Water: 0.035 sq mi (0.09 km^{2})
- Highest elevation (middle of Ellport): 900 ft (270 m)
- Lowest elevation (Connoquenessing Creek): 790 ft (240 m)

Population (2020)
  - Total: 1,082
  - Density: 2,523.4/sq mi (974.28/km^{2})
- Time zone: UTC-4 (EST)
  - Summer (DST): UTC-5 (EDT)
- ZIP code: 16117
- Area code: 724
- FIPS code: 42-23280
- Website: ellportboro.com

Ellport is a borough in southern Lawrence County, Pennsylvania, United States. The population was 1,081 at the 2020 census. It is part of the Pittsburgh metropolitan area. The name is a portmanteau of Ellwood City and Portersville, the boroughs that lie to its west and east.

== History ==
Through 1919, a little more than 1/3 of Ellport existed as the Ellwood City Country Club. The portion that was the Country Club is to the west side of Golf Avenue. The clubhouse was located on the property near 111 Fourth Street.

In 1920, a realty company from Pittsburgh bought the golf course and sold lots for about $600 each. In addition, the realty company began to purchase farms to the east of Golf Avenue from families such as the Deemers, the Mahonys and the Gartleys.

At this time, this area was still part of Wayne Township. In 1929, residents petitioned the courts for Ellport to become its own borough. This petition was signed by 183 residents, including 10 people who could not write their names and signed with an "X".

The borough was founded by a court order on February 15, 1929, signed by President Judge Daniel M. Foley of Lawrence County.

== Geography ==
Ellport is located at 40°51′37″N 80°15′43″W (40.860396, -80.262051).

According to the United States Census Bureau, the borough has a total area of 0.5 square miles (1.3 km^{2}), of which 0.4 square miles (1.0 km^{2}) is land and 0.04 square miles (0.10 km^{2}), or 4.35%, is water.

== Demographics ==
Historical population
Census	Pop.	Note	%±
1930	1,009		—
1940	967		−4.2%
1950	1,122		16.0%
1960	1,458		29.9%
1970	1,350		−7.4%
1980	1,290		−4.4%
1990	1,243		−3.6%
2000	1,148		−7.6%
2010	1,180		2.8%
2020	1,082		−8.3%
2021 (est.)	1,085	▲	0.3%

As of the census of 2000, there were 1,148 people, 482 households, and 335 families residing in the borough. The population density was 2,642.4 inhabitants per square mile (1,020.2/km^{2}). There were 501 housing units at an average density of 1,153.2 per square mile (445.3/km^{2}). The racial makeup of the borough was 98.52% White, 0.61% African American, 0.09% Native American, 0.17% Asian, 0.09% from other races, and 0.52% from two or more races. Hispanic or Latino of any race were 0.52% of the population.

There were 482 households, out of which 27.0% had children under the age of 18 living with them, 56.4% were married couples living together, 9.8% had a female householder with no husband present, and 30.3% were non-families. 28.0% of all households were made up of individuals, and 15.6% had someone living alone who was 65 years of age or older. The average household size was 2.38 and the average family size was 2.91.

In the borough the population was spread out, with 22.7% under the age of 18, 6.5% from 18 to 24, 23.7% from 25 to 44, 25.7% from 45 to 64, and 21.3% who were 65 years of age or older. The median age was 43 years. For every 100 females, there were 92.6 males. For every 100 females age 18 and over, there were 89.9 males.

The median income for a household in the borough was $34,063, and the median income for a family was $41,406. Males had a median income of $37,014 versus $22,313 for females. The per capita income for the borough was $15,447. About 6.5% of families and 8.1% of the population were below the poverty line, including 10.6% of those under age 18 and 2.4% of those age 65 or over.

== Education ==
The Ellwood City Area School District serves the borough.

== Transportation ==
=== Major roads and highways ===
- PA 488
