= Frisco, Pennsylvania =

Unincorporated community in Pennsylvania, US

- Unincorporated community, CDP
- Location within Pennsylvania Location within the United States
- Coordinates: 40°50′52″N 80°16′04″W
- Country: United States
- State: Pennsylvania
- Counties: Beaver, Lawrence
- Townships: Franklin, Perry

Area
  - Total: 0.46 sq mi (1.19 km^{2})
  - Land: 0.44 sq mi (1.15 km^{2})
  - Water: 0.015 sq mi (0.04 km^{2})
- Elevation: 930 ft (280 m)

Population (2020)
  - Total: 914
  - Density: 2,062.7/sq mi (796.42/km^{2})
- Time zone: UTC-6 (Central (EST))
  - Summer (DST): UTC-4 (EST)
- ZIP code: 16117
- Area code: 724
- GNIS feature ID: 1175275

Frisco is an unincorporated community and census-designated place in Franklin Township, Beaver County, Pennsylvania, United States. A portion extends north into Perry Township in Lawrence County. It is located along Pennsylvania Route 288, southeast of Ellwood City. The area was the site of a tube mill during World War I. The population of Frisco was 914 as of the 2020 census.

== Demographics ==
Historical population
Census	Pop.	Note	%±
2020	914		—
U.S. Decennial Census
