= Leslie H. Sabo Jr. =

US Army Medal of Honor recipient (1948–1970)

Leslie Halasz Sabo Jr.
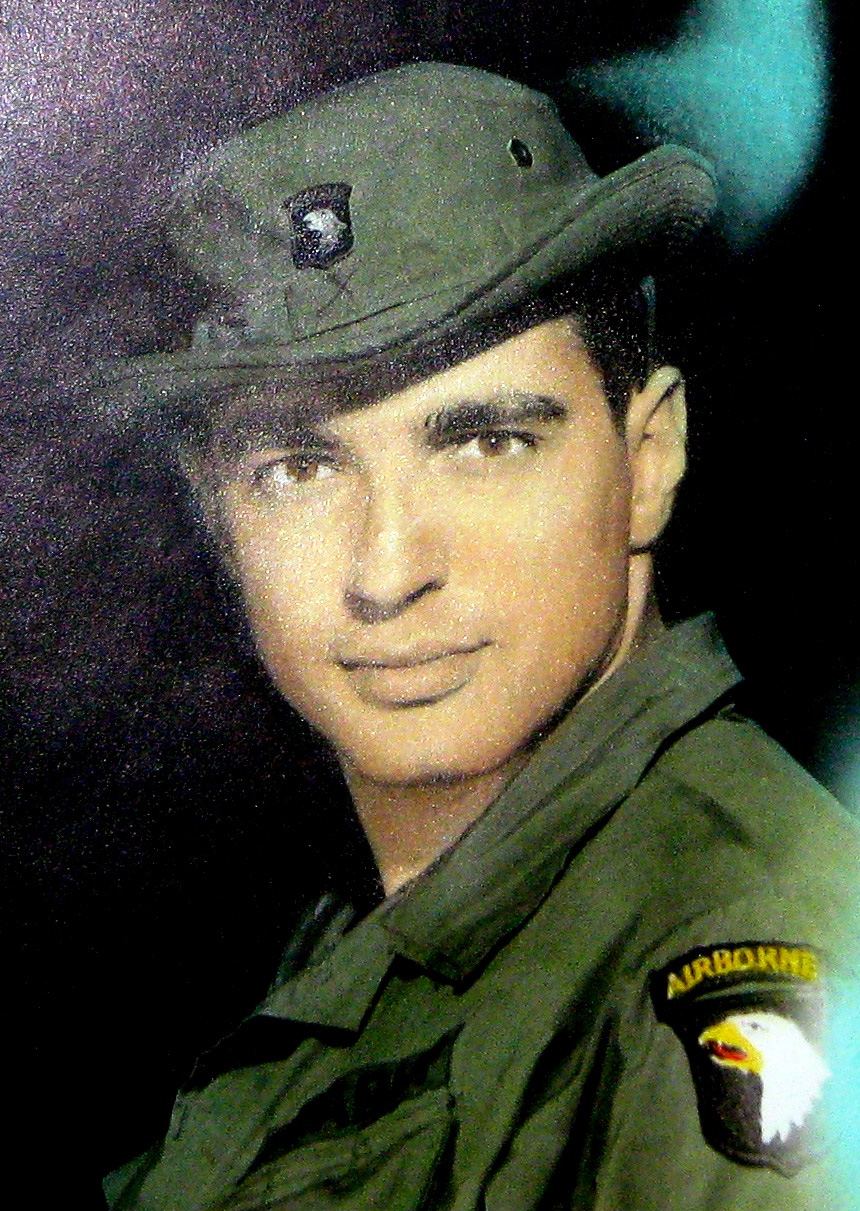
- Leslie Halasz Sabo Jr. in 1969
- Born: 22 February 1948; Kufstein, Austria
- Died: 10 May 1970 (aged 22); Se San, Cambodia
- Burial place: North Sewickley Township, Pennsylvania
- Military career
- Allegiance: United States
- Branch: United States Army
- Service years: 1969–1970
- Rank: Sergeant (posthumous)
- Units: Company B, 3d Battalion, 506th Infantry Regiment
- Conflicts: Vietnam War: Cambodian Campaign †
- Awards: Medal of Honor; Bronze Star; Purple Heart; Air Medal

Leslie Halasz Sabo Jr. (Hungarian: ifj. Halász Szabó László; 22 February 1948 – 10 May 1970) was a soldier in the United States Army during the Vietnam War. He received the highest military decoration, the Medal of Honor, for his actions during the Cambodian Campaign in 1970.

Born in Kufstein, Austria, Sabo's family immigrated to the United States when he was young and moved to Ellwood City, Pennsylvania. Sabo dropped out of college and was drafted into the U.S. Army in 1969, becoming a member of the 506th Infantry Regiment, 101st Airborne Division. On 10 May 1970 Sabo's unit was on an interdiction mission near Se San, Cambodia when they were ambushed from all sides by the Vietnam People's Army. Sabo repeatedly exposed himself to North Vietnamese fire, protecting other soldiers from a grenade blast and providing covering fire for American helicopters until he was killed.

Sabo was recommended for the Medal of Honor shortly after his death, but the records were lost. In 1999 a fellow Vietnam War veteran came across the records and began the process of reopening Sabo's recommendation. Following several delays, Sabo's widow received the Medal of Honor from President Barack Obama on 16 May 2012, 42 years after his death.

== Biography ==
=== Early life ===
Sabo was born in Kufstein, Austria, on 22 February 1948 to Elizabeth and Leslie Sabo Sr., who had been members of an upper-class Hungarian family. Leslie Jr. had one brother, George, who was born in 1944, as well as a second brother who had been killed in World War II bombings at the age of one. With the post-World War II occupation of Hungary by the Soviet Union, Sabo's family lost their fortune in the war and, upon realizing Communism would be installed in Hungary long-term, they left the country permanently.

The Sabo family moved to the United States in 1950 just after Sabo turned two years old. Leslie Sr., who had previously worked as a lawyer, attended evening classes to become an engineer in the United States. The family moved to Youngstown, Ohio, and lived there for a short time before moving to Ellwood City, Pennsylvania, as Leslie Sr. followed a job at Blaw-Knox Corp. Growing up, Sabo's father stressed discipline and patriotism. Sabo graduated from Lincoln High School in 1966 and briefly attended Youngstown State University before dropping out and working at a steel mill for a short time. He was described by friends and family as an affectionate and "kind-hearted hometown boy" who was easygoing and always in good humor. He enjoyed billiards and bowling.

=== Military career ===
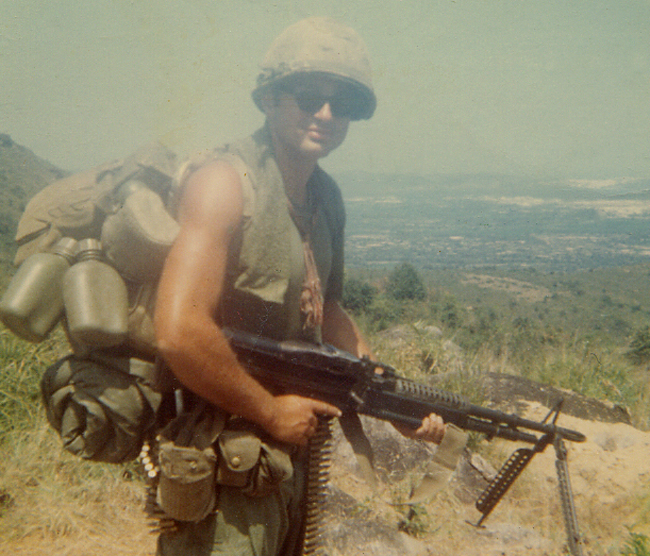
Sabo in 1969 holding an M-60 Machine Gun.

Sabo was drafted into the United States Army in April 1969 and sent to Fort Benning, Georgia, for basic combat training. While on leave he married Rose Sabo-Brown (née Buccelli), the daughter of a World War II veteran and Silver Star Medal recipient, whom he had met in 1967. He attended advanced individual training in September and October of that year, followed by a honeymoon trip to New York City. Sabo was assigned to Bravo Company of the 3rd Battalion, 506th Infantry Regiment, U.S. 101st Airborne Division, and was known to enjoy his time in the military, preferring the environment of discipline and camaraderie.

In January 1970 Sabo and his unit departed for Vietnam to fight in the Vietnam War and he began corresponding with his wife regularly via letter. The unit came into contact with North Vietnamese troops frequently for the first several months of its deployment, but most of these were small hit-and-run attacks. On 5 May 1970 Sabo's platoon was attached to the U.S. 4th Infantry Division for a secret mission into Cambodia and dropped into the country on a UH-1 Huey helicopter. They were to conduct a series of interdiction missions against the Ho Chi Minh Trail with the assistance of heavy air support. For five days they came into constant, heavy contact with North Vietnamese forces that were often of superior size.

=== Medal of Honor action ===
On 10 May 1970 Sabo's platoon was part of a force of two platoons from Bravo Company on a mission to Se San, Cambodia. They were to engage a force of North Vietnamese Army (NVA) troops that had used the area as a staging ground for the Tet Offensive and other attacks. There they were ambushed by a force of 150 NVA troops hidden in the jungle and the trees, which had caught the American force in the open and unprepared. This battle became known as the "Mother's Day ambush." Sabo, who was at the column's end, repeatedly repulsed efforts by the North Vietnamese to surround and overrun the Americans. As the battle continued, a North Vietnamese soldier threw a grenade near a wounded American soldier lying in the open. Sabo ran out from a small tree that had been providing him cover and draped himself over his wounded comrade as the grenade exploded. Then, after absorbing multiple wounds from the grenade blast, Sabo attacked the enemy trench, killing two soldiers with a grenade of his own, and helped his injured ally to the shelter of a nearby treeline. Later, with the Americans running out of ammunition, Sabo again exposed himself to retrieve rounds from Americans killed earlier in the day.

Sabo then began redistributing ammunition to other members of the platoon, including stripping ammunition from wounded and dead comrades. As night fell the North Vietnamese refocused their efforts from wiping out the American force to harassing the helicopters that were carrying more than two dozen wounded soldiers. As that was occurring, the remaining platoon from Bravo Company broke through the North Vietnamese lines and relieved the other two platoons while the first medical helicopter arrived and loaded two wounded soldiers under heavy fire. Sabo again stepped out into the open and provided covering fire for the helicopter until his ammunition was exhausted. He received several serious wounds under heavy fire by the North Vietnamese while trying to reload. Although mortally wounded, Sabo crawled forward toward the enemy emplacement, pulled the pin of a grenade, and threw it at the last possible second toward an enemy bunker. The resulting explosion silenced the enemy bunker at the cost of Sabo's life. In all, seven other members of the platoon were killed in this ambush and another 28 were wounded. The North Vietnamese forces lost 49.

=== Subsequent recognition ===
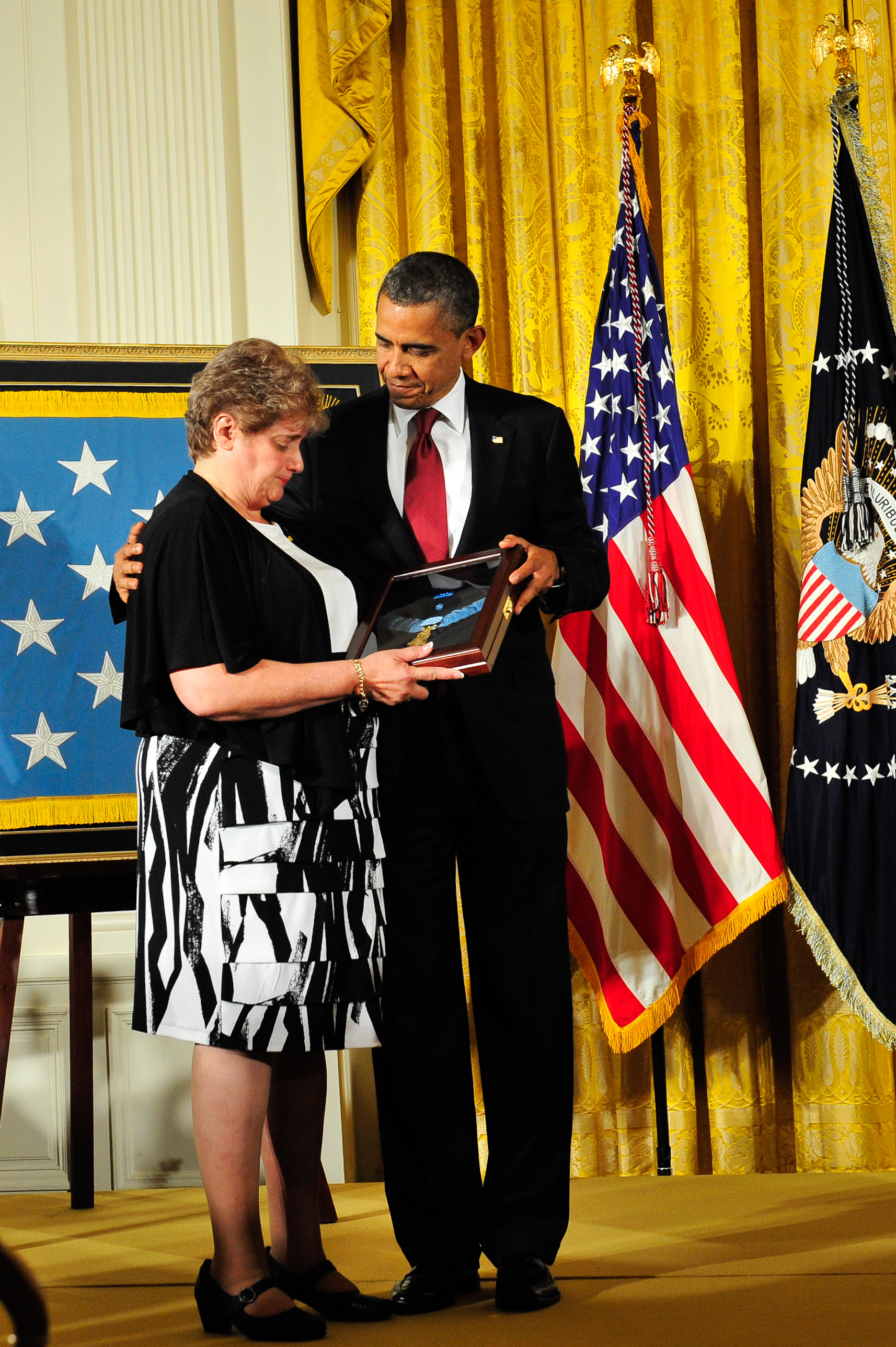
President Barack Obama presents Sabo's Medal of Honor to his widow, Rose Mary Sabo-Brown

Although he was posthumously promoted to the rank of sergeant, the circumstances of Sabo's death remained unclear to his family for several decades thereafter. Officially the military reported Sabo had been killed by a sniper while guarding an ammunition cache somewhere in Vietnam. Shortly after the action Sabo's company commander, Captain Jim Waybright, recommended him for the Medal of Honor, but the accounts of Sabo's actions and citation were lost for several decades. This changed in 1999 when Alton Mabb, another Vietnam War veteran of the 101st Airborne Division and a columnist for the division association magazine, uncovered the documents while at the National Archives in College Park, Maryland. Mabb publicized Sabo's exploits in the magazine and also wrote U.S. Congresswoman Corrine Brown D.-FL, whom he asked to forward the recommendation. Brown lobbied the U.S. Department of Defense for Sabo to be recognized and, in 2006, Secretary of the Army Francis J. Harvey recommended that Sabo receive the Medal of Honor. Due to the delay in processing the citation, however, the award had to be approved by an act of Congress, so Brown attached it as a rider to a 2008 defense authorization bill. After continued delays in the process, however, Sabo's family contacted U.S. Congressman Jason Altmire D.-PA to push the award through the Defense Department. Secretary of the Army John McHugh recommended the Medal of Honor for Sabo in March 2010 and, on 16 April 2012, it was announced that Sabo's family would receive the medal from U.S. President Barack Obama at a White House ceremony, 42 years after the action. Sabo posthumously received the Medal of Honor at the White House on 16 May 2012, which was accepted by his widow. Sabo is interred at Holy Redeemer Cemetery in North Sewickley Township, Pennsylvania, and is honored at a memorial to B Company in Marietta, Ohio, the home of his former commanding officer. Company of Heroes, a book written by Ellwood City-based journalist Eric Poole about Sabo and his fellow soldiers in Bravo Company, was released in 2015 by Osprey Publishing.

== Awards and decorations ==

In addition to the Medal of Honor Sabo also received several other honors as well as being posthumously promoted to the rank of sergeant. His other military decorations include the Purple Heart Medal, the Air Medal, the Army Commendation Medal, the Army Good Conduct Medal, the National Defense Service Medal, the Vietnam Service Medal with two campaign stars, the Vietnam Military Merit Medal, the Vietnam Gallantry Cross with Bronze Palm, and the Vietnam Campaign Medal. His unit awards include the Vietnam Gallantry Cross Unit Citation and the Vietnam Civil Actions Unit Citation.

=== Medal of Honor citation ===
Sabo was the 249th person to be awarded the Medal of Honor for actions in the Vietnam War and the 3,458th awardee in the history of the medal.

For conspicuous gallantry and intrepidity at the risk of his life above and beyond the call of duty: Specialist Four Leslie H. Sabo Jr. distinguished himself by conspicuous acts of gallantry and intrepidity above and beyond the call of duty at the cost of his own life while serving as a rifleman in Company B, 3d Battalion, 506th Infantry, 101st Airborne Division in Se San, Cambodia, on May 10, 1970. On that day, Specialist Four Sabo and his platoon were conducting a reconnaissance patrol when they were ambushed from all sides by a large enemy force. Without hesitation, Specialist Four Sabo charged an enemy position, killing several enemy soldiers. Immediately thereafter, he assaulted an enemy flanking force, successfully drawing their fire away from friendly soldiers and ultimately forcing the enemy to retreat. In order to re-supply ammunition, he sprinted across an open field to a wounded comrade. As he began to reload, an enemy grenade landed nearby. Specialist Four Sabo picked it up, threw it, and shielded his comrade with his own body, thus absorbing the brunt of the blast and saving his comrade's life. Seriously wounded by the blast, Specialist Four Sabo nonetheless retained the initiative and then single-handedly charged an enemy bunker that had inflicted severe damage on the platoon, receiving several serious wounds from automatic weapons fire in the process. Now mortally injured, he crawled towards the enemy emplacement and, when in position, threw a grenade into the bunker. The resulting explosion silenced the enemy fire, but also ended Specialist Four Sabo's life. His indomitable courage and complete disregard for his own safety saved the lives of many of his platoon members. Specialist Four Sabo's extraordinary heroism and selflessness, above and beyond the call of duty, at the cost of his life, are in keeping with the highest traditions of military service and reflect great credit upon himself, Company B, 3d Battalion, 506th Infantry, 101st Airborne Division, and the United States Army.

== See also ==
- List of Medal of Honor recipients for the Vietnam War
