= Wurtemburg, Pennsylvania =

- Unincorporated community Census designated place
- Location within Pennsylvania Location within the United States
- Coordinates: 40°51′21.6″N 80°15′3.6″W
- Country: United States
- State: Pennsylvania
- County: Beaver and Lawrence
- Township: Franklin and Perry

Area
  - Total: 0.5895 sq mi (1.527 km^{2})
  - Land: 0.5790 sq mi (1.500 km^{2})
  - Water: 0.0160 sq mi (0.041 km^{2})
- Elevation: 886 ft (270 m)
- Time zone: UTC-5 (Eastern (EST))
  - Summer (DST): UTC-4 (EDT)
- FIPS code: 4286648
- GNIS feature ID: 2830944

Wurtemburg is an unincorporated community and census designated place (CDP) in Franklin Township, Beaver County, Pennsylvania and Perry Township, Lawrence County, Pennsylvania.

== Demographics ==
Historical population
Census	Pop.	Note	%±
U.S. Decennial Census

The United States Census Bureau first defined Wurtemburg as a census designated place in 2023.
