= ECASD =

ECASD may refer to:

- Ellwood City Area School District (Pennsylvania)
- Eau Claire Area School District (Wisconsin)
