= Perry Township, Lawrence County, Pennsylvania =

Township in Pennsylvania, US

Coordinates: 40°52′28″N 80°13′29″W

Perry Township
- Township
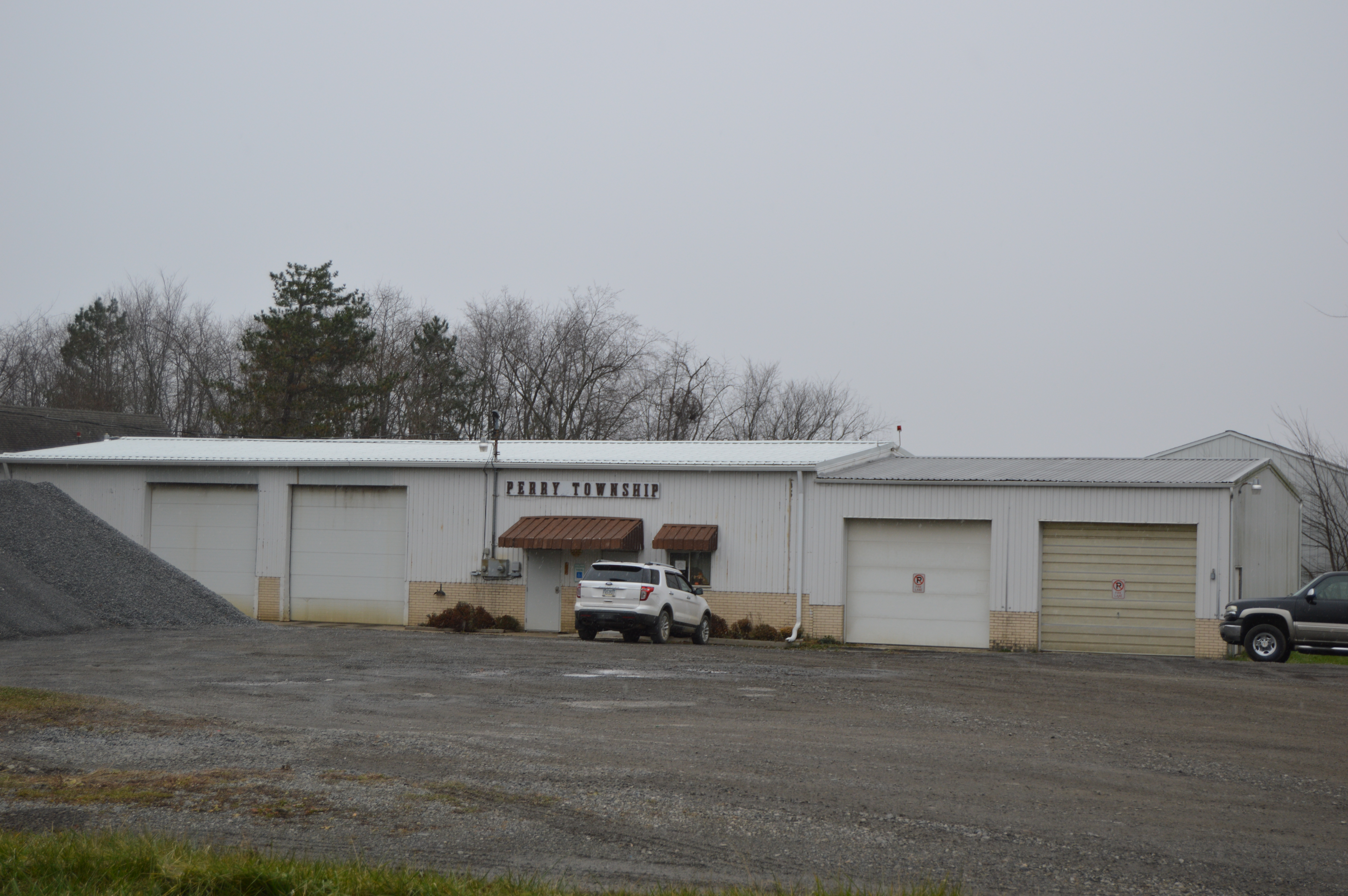
- Town hall

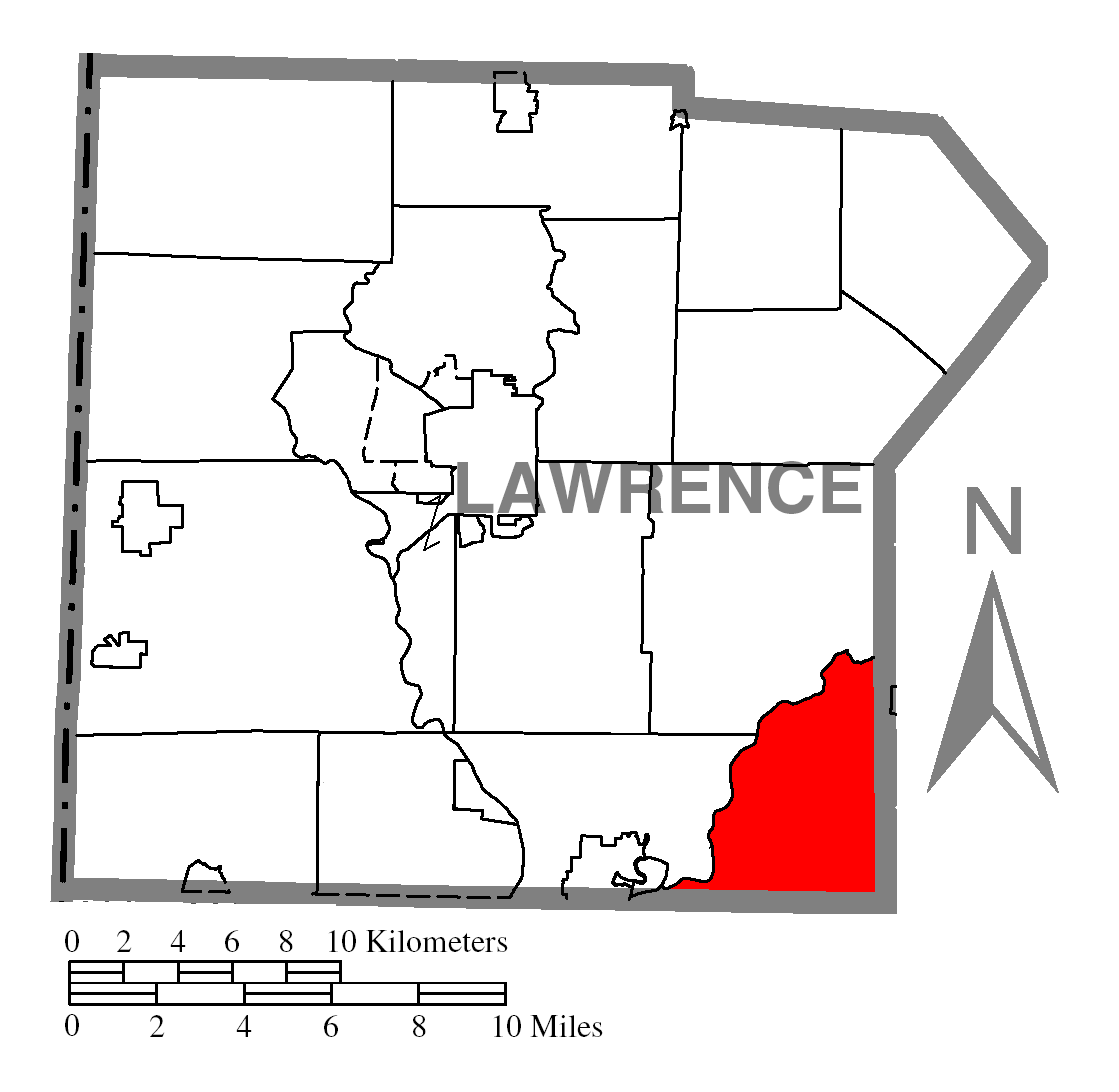
- Location of Perry Township in Lawrence County

- Location of Lawrence County in Pennsylvania
- Country: United States
- State: Pennsylvania
- County: Lawrence
- Established: 1845

Area
  - Total: 18.57 sq mi (48.10 km^{2})
  - Land: 18.37 sq mi (47.59 km^{2})
  - Water: 0.20 sq mi (0.51 km^{2})
- Highest elevation (point on PA 488): 1,440 ft (440 m)
- Lowest elevation (Connoquenessing Creek): 840 ft (260 m)

Population (2020)
  - Total: 1,854
  - Estimate (2022): 1,828
  - Density: 102.6/sq mi (39.61/km^{2})
- Time zone: UTC-4 (EST)
  - Summer (DST): UTC-5 (EDT)
- Area code: 724
- FIPS code: 42-073-59488
- Website: www.perrytownshiplawrencecountypa.com

Historical population
Census	Pop.	Note	%±
2000	1,930		—
2010	1,938		0.4%
2020	1,854		−4.3%
2022 (est.)	1,828		−1.4%
U.S. Decennial Census

Perry Township is a township in Lawrence County, Pennsylvania, United States. The population was 1,854 at the time of the 2020 census, a decline from the figure of 1,938 tabulated in 2010. It was originally incorporated in 1845 as part of Beaver County, and in 1849, joined the newly created Lawrence County.

== Geography ==
According to the United States Census Bureau, the township has a total area of 18.5 square miles (47.8 km^{2}), of which 18.4 square miles (47.6 km^{2}) is land and 0.1 square mile (0.2 km^{2}), or 0.32%, is water.

Slippery Rock Creek forms the northwestern border of the township, separating it from Slippery Rock Township to the northwest and Wayne Township to the west.

Perry Township is bordered to the south by Beaver County and to the east by Butler County.

Unincorporated communities in the township include Pleasant Hill, Pyles Mills, Wurtemburg, and part of Frisco.

Parts of McConnells Mill State Park are in the northwestern part of the township in the valley of Slippery Rock Creek.

== Demographics ==
As of the census of 2000, there were 1,930 people, 735 households, and 566 families residing in the township.

The population density was 104.9 inhabitants per square mile (40.5/km^{2}). There were 772 housing units at an average density of 42.0 per square mile (16.2/km^{2}).

The racial makeup of the township was 99.12% White, 0.31% African American, 0.26% Asian, and 0.31% from two or more races. Hispanic or Latino of any race were 0.16% of the population.

There were 735 households, out of which 30.7% had children under the age of 18 living with them, 66.7% were married couples living together, 7.3% had a female householder with no husband present, and 22.9% were non-families. 19.5% of all households were made up of individuals, and 10.5% had someone living alone who was 65 years of age or older.

The average household size was 2.63 and the average family size was 2.99.

In the township the population was spread out, with 22.5% under the age of 18, 7.0% from 18 to 24, 29.3% from 25 to 44, 26.8% from 45 to 64, and 14.4% who were 65 years of age or older. The median age was 41 years.

For every 100 females, there were 103.2 males. For every 100 females age 18 and over, there were 97.8 males.

The median income for a household in the township was $40,887, and the median income for a family was $46,793. Males had a median income of $35,767 versus $24,205 for females.

The per capita income for the township was $18,066.

Roughly 8.0% of families and 10.2% of the population were below the poverty line, including 14.6% of those under age 18 and 6.7% of those age 65 or over.

== Education ==
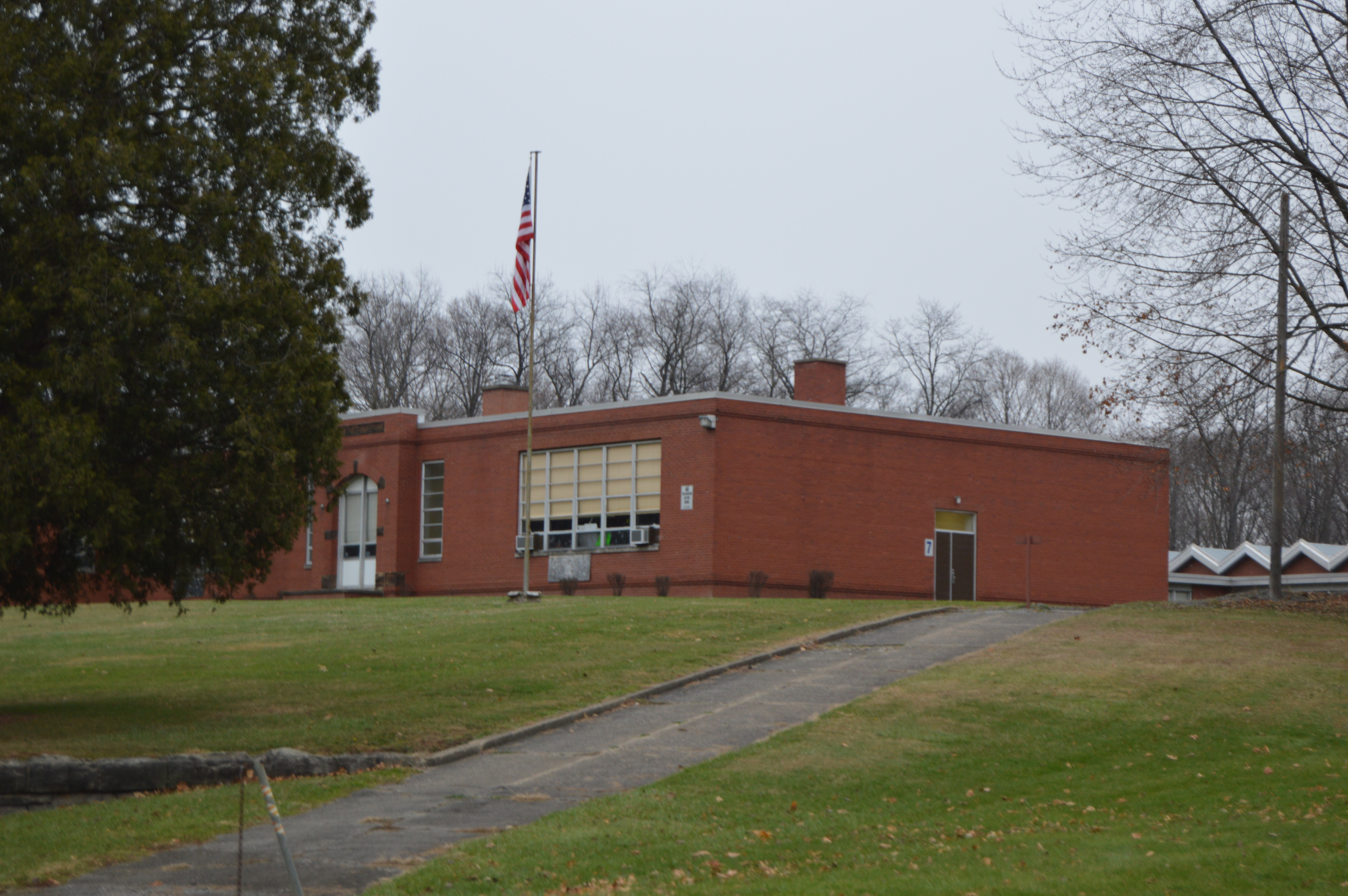
Township school at Wurtemburg

The Ellwood City Area School District serves the township.

== Transportation ==
=== Major roads and highways ===
- PA 488
