= ALLED Lighting Systems =

American LED lighting manufacturer

- Industry: Solid-state LED Lighting
- Founded: March 2007
- Founder: James Wassel
- Headquarters: Ellwood City, Pennsylvania
- Products: Intelligent Street and Area Lighting; Parking Garage and Canopy Lighting; High and Low Bay Lighting
- Website: http://www.alled.co/

ALLED Lighting Systems, formerly known as Appalachian Lighting Systems, Inc. is an American LED lighting manufacturer. The headquarters is located in Ellwood City, Pennsylvania. This company focuses on and manufactures commercial and industrial type lighting.

== History ==
ALLED was established in March 2007 by its Chief Science Officer James Wassel, and began its first major installation in the borough of Ellwood City, Pennsylvania. As the company grew, it developed a wider range of LED lighting products and completed a number of large installations.

== Products ==
The company offers Roadway, Street and Area Lighting, Parking Garage and Canopy Lighting, High and Low Bay Lighting, T8K Strip Lighting and Wall Pack and Flood Lighting. The legacy lighting products were the first "generation" lighting created by the company.

In 2014 ALLED began selling a new LED lighting system called RAYdiant; it features one high-powered COB LED per light-engine module, and is technically simpler, more scalable and efficient that older LED designs.

ALLED Lighting Systems developed 'ALLink' a wireless monitoring and control system which allows users to save energy and to monitor the operation of lighting fixtures remotely via computer or smartphone.

== Major installations ==
Some of the company's largest installation projects are:

- Welland, Ontario street lighting
- Pittsburgh International Airport
- General Motors Lordstown Complex
