= Buzz Guy =

American football player (1936–2010)

No. 60, 63
- Positions: Guard, offensive tackle, defensive tackle

Personal information
- Born: March 20, 1936; Ellwood City, Pennsylvania, U.S.
- Died: November 25, 2010 (aged 74); Ellwood City, Pennsylvania, U.S.
- Listed height: 6 ft 3 in (1.91 m)
- Listed weight: 248 lb (112 kg)

Career information
- High school: Lincoln (PA)
- College: Duke
- NFL draft: 1958: 3rd round, 34th overall pick

Career history
- New York Giants (1958–1959); Dallas Cowboys (1960); Houston Oilers (1961); Denver Broncos (1961)

Awards and highlights
- AFL champion (1961); All-ACC (1957)

Career NFL/AFL statistics
- Games played: 44
- Games started: 16
- Stats at Pro Football Reference

Melwood Norman "Buzz" Guy, Jr. (March 20, 1936 – November 25, 2010) was an American professional football offensive lineman in the National Football League (NFL) for the New York Giants and Dallas Cowboys. He also was a member of the Denver Broncos and Houston Oilers in the American Football League (AFL). He played college football at Duke University.

== Early life ==
Guy hails from Ellwood City, Pennsylvania, where he played for the Lincoln High School Wolverines. Following graduation in 1954, he attended Duke University, where he played football. According to his obituary, he was known as Buster in high school, a more fitting name for a star athlete than "Melwood from Ellwood". Later Buster was shortened to Buzz because Duke athletics eschewed multisyllabic monikers in the 1950s.

He was an offensive lineman that alternated between guard and tackle. He saw action in the 1955 Orange Bowl in which the Blue Devils rolled over Nebraska 34–7. Following the game, Nebraska head coach Bill Glassford singled out the play of Duke's offensive line as the key to the game, saying, "That Duke line outcharged us". He left school with one year remaining of eligibility to join the NFL.

== Professional career ==
=== Cleveland Browns ===
He was selected in the third round (34th overall) of the 1958 NFL draft by the Cleveland Browns. The Browns were using him at defensive end, before being waived on September 22.

=== New York Giants ===
On October 7, 1958, he was signed as a free agent by the New York Giants. He played two seasons as a backup offensive tackle and offensive guard.

=== Dallas Cowboys ===
Guy was selected by the Dallas Cowboys in the 1960 NFL expansion draft and became the first starter at right guard in franchise history. He registered 7 starts, before being passed on the depth chart by Mike Falls. He was released on September 5, 1961.

=== Houston Oilers ===
On September 22, 1961, he was signed as a free agent by the Houston Oilers.

=== Denver Broncos ===
In October 1961, he signed with the Denver Broncos of the American Football League as a free agent and played in 9 games as a backup offensive lineman.
