= Chewton =

Chewton may refer to:

- Chewton, Pennsylvania, a census-designated place in the United States
- Chewton, Victoria, a town in Australia
- Chewton Keynsham, a hamlet in Somerset, United Kingdom
- Chewton Mendip, a village in Somerset, United Kingdom
- Hundred of Chewton, a historical region in Somerset, United Kingdom
