= Chewton, Pennsylvania =

Unincorporated community in Pennsylvania, US

- Census-designated place
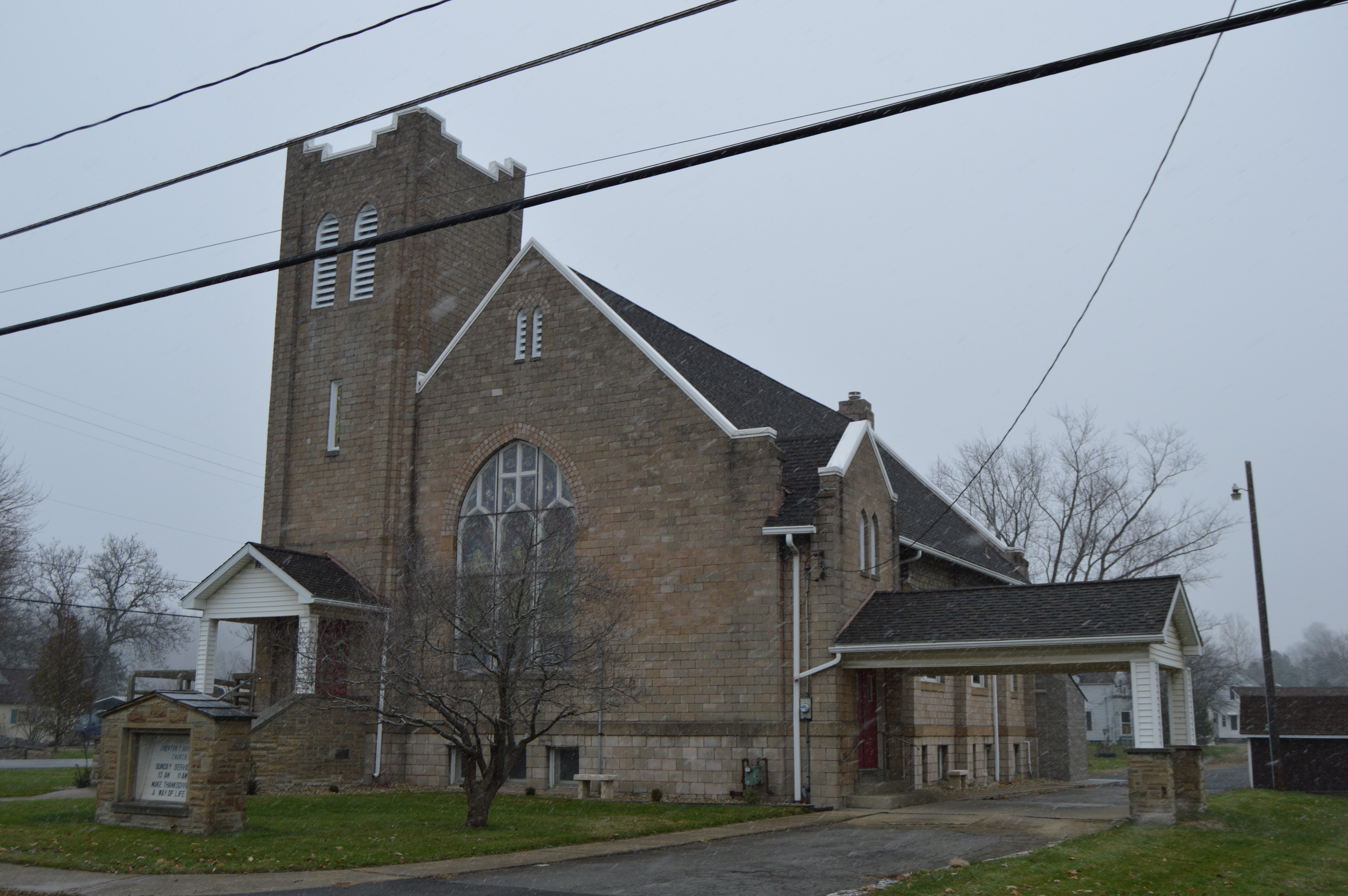
- Chewton Christian Church

- Location within Pennsylvania Location within the United States
- Coordinates: 40°53′21″N 80°19′33″W
- Country: United States
- State: Pennsylvania
- County: Lawrence
- Township: Wayne

Area
  - Total: 1.51 sq mi (3.91 km^{2})
  - Land: 1.49 sq mi (3.87 km^{2})
  - Water: 0.015 sq mi (0.04 km^{2})
- Elevation: 910 ft (280 m)

Population (2020)
  - Total: 395
  - Density: 264.4/sq mi (102.07/km^{2})
- Time zone: UTC-4 (EST)
  - Summer (DST): UTC-5 (EDT)
- Area code: 724
- FIPS code: 42-13408
- GNIS feature ID: 1171765

Chewton is an unincorporated community and census-designated place (CDP) in Lawrence County, Pennsylvania, United States. The population was 395 at the 2020 census.

== Geography ==
Chewton is located in southern Lawrence County at 40°53′21″N 80°19′33″W (40.8976, -80.3184), in the northwestern part of Wayne Township. It sits on a bluff overlooking the east bank of the Beaver River. It is bordered across the river by the borough of Wampum.

Chewton is 9 miles (14 km) south of New Castle, the county seat. Pennsylvania Route 288 passes through the southwestern side of the community, leading west across the Beaver River into Wampum and southeast 4 miles (6 km) to Ellwood City.

According to the United States Census Bureau, the CDP has a total area of 1.5 square miles (3.9 km^{2}), of which 0.02 square miles (0.04 km^{2}), or 1.06%, are water. Via the Beaver River, Chewton is part of the Ohio River watershed.

== Demographics ==
Historical population
Census	Pop.	Note	%±
2020	395		—
U.S. Decennial Census
