= Ellwood City Area School District =

School district in Pennsylvania

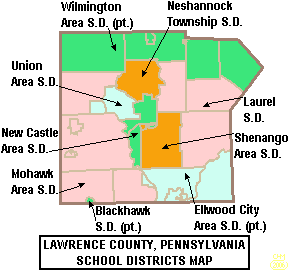

Address
- 501 Crescent Ave Ellwood City, Lawrence County and Beaver County, Pennsylvania, 16117-1957; United States

District information
- Type: Public

Other information
- Website: www.ellwood.k12.pa.us

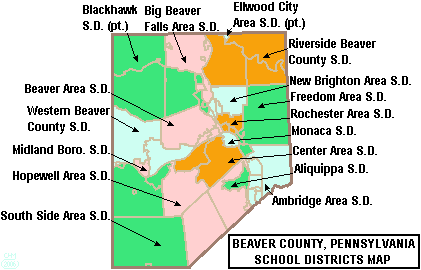
Ellwood City Area School District region in Beaver County

The Ellwood City Area School District (ECASD) is a diminutive, suburban, public school district located in Beaver County, Pennsylvania and Lawrence County, Pennsylvania. It serves the boroughs of Ellwood City, Ellport, and New Beaver, Wampum, and the townships of Wayne, and Perry Townships. Ellwood City Area School District encompasses approximately 49 square miles (130 km^{2}). According to 2000 federal census data, it served a resident population of 14,040. In 2010 the district's population risen to 14,341 people. In 2009, the district residents’ per capita income was $16,554, while the median family income was $42,326. In the Commonwealth, the median family income was $49,501 and the United States median family income was $49,445, in 2010.

Ellwood City Area School District operates Lincoln Junior-Senior High School (7th-12th), North Side Primary (K-2nd), Perry Lower Intermediate (3rd-4th), Hartman Intermediate (5th-6th).

== Extracurriculars ==
Ellwood City Area School District offers a variety of clubs, activities and an extensive sports program.

=== Sports ===
The district funds:

Boys

- Baseball - AA
- Basketball- AAA
- Cross country - AA
- Football - AA
- Golf - AA
- Soccer - AA
- Tennis - AA
- Track and field - AA
- Wrestling - AA

Girls

- Basketball - AAA
- Cross country - AA
- Golf - AA
- Soccer (Fall) - AA
- Softball - AAA
- Girls' tennis - AA
- Track and field - AAA
- Volleyball - AA

Junior high school sports

Boys

- Baseball
- Basketball
- Cross country
- Football
- Track and field
- Wrestling

Girls

- Basketball
- Cross country
- Softball
- Track and field
- Volleyball

According to PIAA directory July 2012
