= Lincoln High School (Ellwood City, Pennsylvania) =

Coordinates: 40.8566°N 80.2866°W

- 501 Crescent Avenue; Ellwood City, Pennsylvania 16117; United States

Information
- Type: Public
- Motto: Knowledge is good.
- School district: Ellwood City Area School District
- Principal: Michael Garvin and John Sovich
- Teaching staff: 56.80 (FTE)
- Grades: 7–12
- Enrollment: 672 (2022–23)
- Student to teacher ratio: 11.83
- Color
- Mascot: Wolverine
- Website: www.ecasdk12.org/lincoln-jrsr-high-school

Lincoln High School is a public junior and senior high school in Ellwood City, Pennsylvania. It is the only high school in the Ellwood City Area School District. It enrolls 672 students. The school's colors are blue and white.

== Notable alumni ==
- Bob Babcock - Major League Baseball player
- Buzz Guy - Professional football player
- Donnie Iris - Rock musician
- Stephen Johns - Professional ice hockey player
- Leslie H. Sabo, Jr. - Medal of Honor awardee
- Debra McCloskey Todd -PA State Supreme Court Justice
