= Franklin Township, Beaver County, Pennsylvania =

Township in Pennsylvania, US

Coordinates: 40°50′29″N 80°14′10″W

Franklin Township, Pennsylvania
- Township
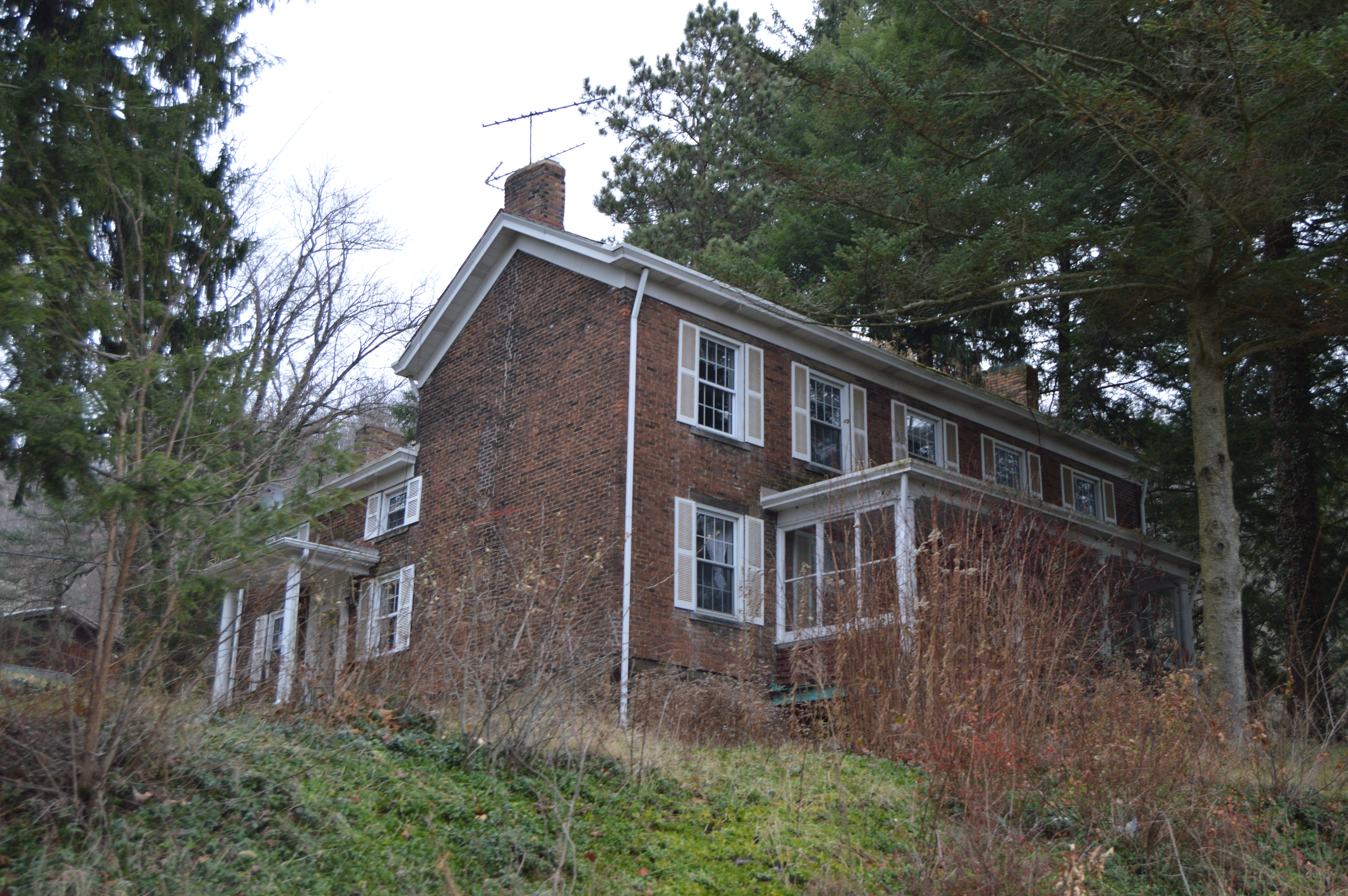
- Fombell House at Fombell, built 1829

- Location in Beaver County and state of Pennsylvania
- Country: United States
- State: Pennsylvania
- County: Beaver
- Incorporated: 1850

Area
  - Total: 18.01 sq mi (46.65 km^{2})
  - Land: 17.69 sq mi (45.82 km^{2})
  - Water: 0.32 sq mi (0.83 km^{2})

Population (2020)
  - Total: 3,885 ▼
  - Estimate (2022): 3,808
  - Density: 223.3/sq mi (86.22/km^{2})
- Time zone: UTC-5 (Eastern (EST))
  - Summer (DST): UTC-4 (EDT)
- FIPS code: 42-007-27336
- Website: Website

Franklin Township is a township in Beaver County, Pennsylvania, United States. The population was 3,885 at the 2020 census. It is part of the Pittsburgh metropolitan area.

== Geography ==
According to the United States Census Bureau, the township has a total area of 17.8 square miles (46.2 km^{2}), of which 17.7 square miles (45.8 km^{2}) is land and 0.15 square miles (0.4 km^{2}), or 0.90%, is water. It contains part of the census-designated place of Frisco.

== Demographics ==
Historical population
Census	Pop.	Note	%±
1970	3,488		—
1980	3,772		8.1%
1990	3,821		1.3%
2000	4,307		12.7%
2010	4,052		−5.9%
2020	3,885		−4.1%
2022 (est.)	3,808		−2.0%
U.S. Decennial Census

As of the 2000 census, there were 4,307 people, 1,600 households, and 1,220 families residing in the township. The population density was 244.5 inhabitants per square mile (94.4/km^{2}). There were 1,715 housing units at an average density of 97.3 per square mile (37.6/km^{2}). The racial makeup of the township was 99.30% White, 0.12% African American, 0.12% Native American, 0.14% Asian, 0.07% from other races, and 0.26% from two or more races. Hispanic or Latino of any race were 0.56% of the population.

There were 1,600 households, out of which 34.8% had children under the age of 18 living with them, 64.3% were married couples living together, 8.6% had a female householder with no husband present, and 23.8% were non-families. 20.1% of all households were made up of individuals, and 9.2% had someone living alone who was 65 years of age or older. The average household size was 2.66 and the average family size was 3.06.

In the township the population was spread out, with 25.3% under the age of 18, 7.2% from 18 to 24, 30.0% from 25 to 44, 23.5% from 45 to 64, and 14.0% who were 65 years of age or older. The median age was 39 years. For every 100 females there were 98.2 males. For every 100 females age 18 and over, there were 95.9 males.

The median income for a household in the township was $42,368, and the median income for a family was $45,660. Males had a median income of $37,658 versus $24,625 for females. The per capita income for the township was $20,062. About 5.0% of families and 8.2% of the population were below the poverty line, including 14.4% of those under age 18 and 7.6% of those age 65 or over.
