= Sesan District =

Sesan សេសាន
- District (srok)
- Interactive map of Sesan
- Country: Cambodia
- Province: Stung Treng
- Time zone: +7
- Geocode: 1901

Sesan District is a district located in Stung Treng Province, in north-east Cambodia. According to the 1998 census of Cambodia, it had a population of 11,252.
