= Wayne Township, Lawrence County, Pennsylvania =

Township in Pennsylvania, US

Coordinates: 40°53′12″N 80°17′15″W

Wayne Township
- Township
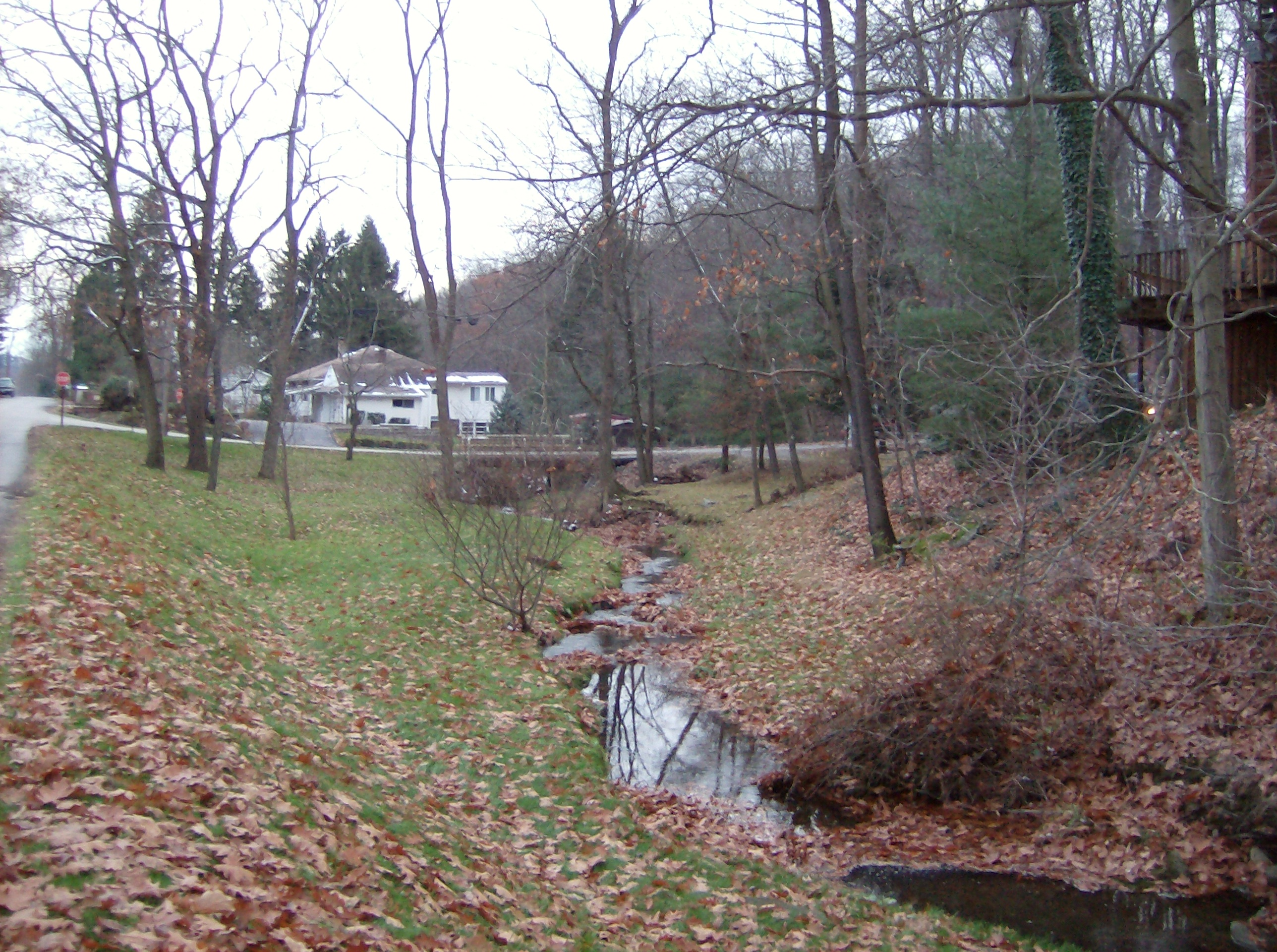
- Squaw Run in Wayne Township

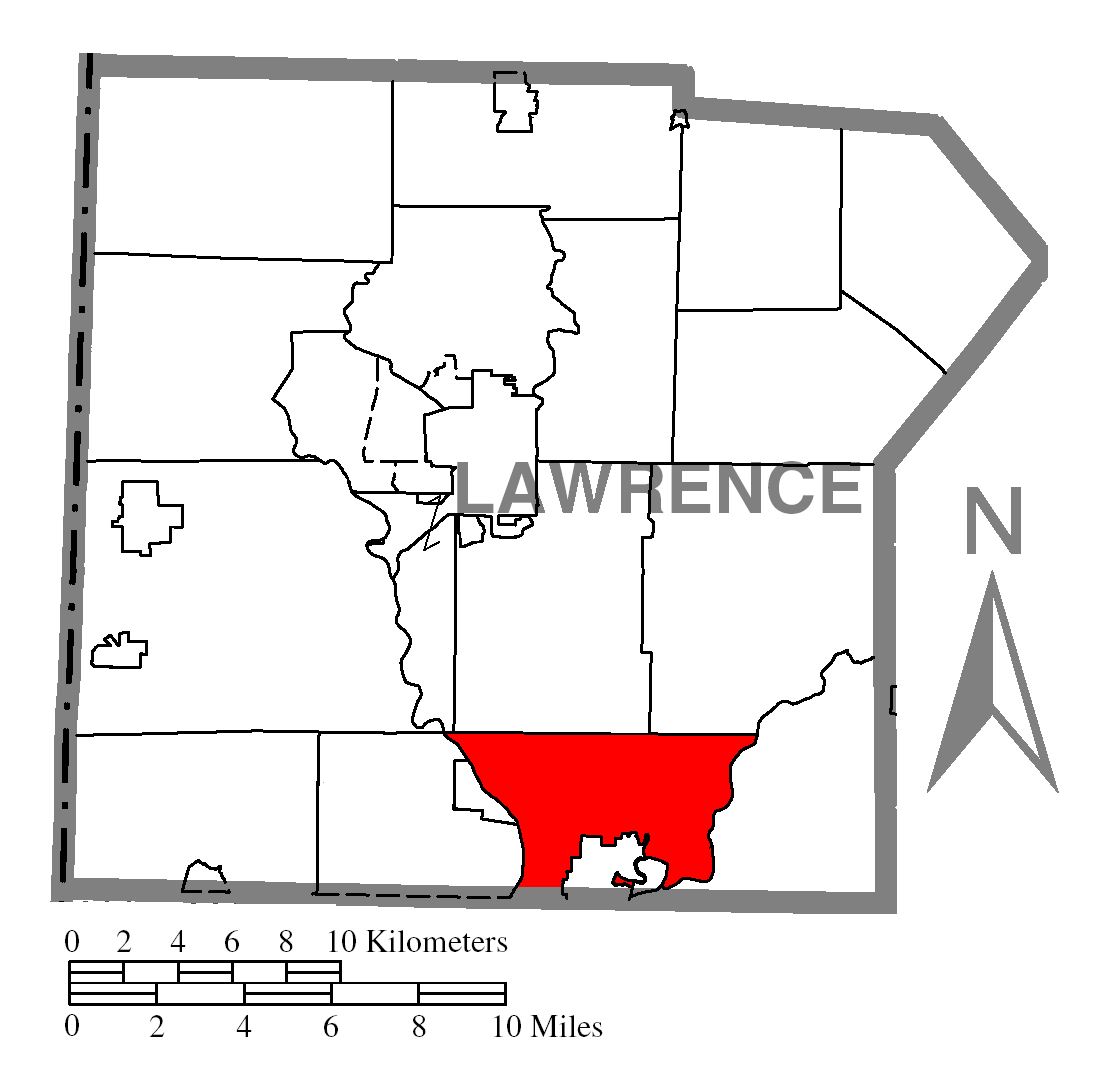
- Location of Wayne Township in Lawrence County

- Location of Lawrence County in Pennsylvania
- Country: United States
- State: Pennsylvania
- County: Lawrence County
- Established: 1845

Area
  - Total: 16.34 sq mi (42.32 km^{2})
  - Land: 16.11 sq mi (41.73 km^{2})
  - Water: 0.22 sq mi (0.58 km^{2})
- Highest elevation (southwest of Duckrun): 1,306 ft (398 m)
- Lowest elevation (Beaver River): 735 ft (224 m)
  - Rank: lowest point in Lawrence County

Population (2020)
  - Total: 2,465
  - Estimate (2022): 2,428
  - Density: 155.8/sq mi (60.14/km^{2})
- Time zone: UTC-4 (EST)
  - Summer (DST): UTC-5 (EDT)
- Area code: 724
- FIPS code: 42-073-81776
- Website: www.waynetownshippa.net

Historical population
Census	Pop.	Note	%±
2000	2,328		—
2010	2,606		11.9%
2020	2,468		−5.3%
2022 (est.)	2,428		−1.6%
U.S. Decennial Census

Wayne Township is a township in Lawrence County, Pennsylvania, United States. The population was 2,468 at the 2020 census, a decline from the figure of 2,606 tabulated in 2010.

== History ==
Wayne Township was originally incorporated in 1845 as part of Beaver County, and in 1849, joined the newly created Lawrence County. The township was linked to New Castle, Ellwood City and Pittsburgh in 1908 by the Pittsburgh, Harmony, Butler and New Castle Railway, an interurban trolley line. The line closed on June 15, 1931, and the trolleys were replaced by buses.

== Geography ==
According to the United States Census Bureau, the township has a total area of 16.4 square miles (42.5 km^{2}), of which 16.1 square miles (41.7 km^{2}) is land and 0.3 square miles (0.8 km^{2}), or 1.83%, is water.

Unincorporated communities in the township include Burnstown, Chewton, Rock Point, and Park Gate.

== Recreation ==
Recreational areas of Wayne County include McConnells Mill State Park and Pennsylvania State Game Lands Number 148.

== Demographics ==
As of the census of 2000, there were 2,328 people, 894 households, and 680 families residing in the township. The population density was 144.4 inhabitants per square mile (55.8/km^{2}). There were 946 housing units at an average density of 58.7 per square mile (22.7/km^{2}). The racial makeup of the township was 98.54% White, 0.39% African American, 0.17% Native American, 0.26% Asian, and 0.64% from two or more races. Hispanic or Latino of any race were 0.52% of the population.

There were 894 households, out of which 30.6% had children under the age of 18 living with them, 62.9% were married couples living together, 7.5% had a female householder with no husband present, and 23.9% were non-families. 20.7% of all households were made up of individuals, and 11.6% had someone living alone who was 65 years of age or older. The average household size was 2.59 and the average family size was 3.00.

In the township the population was spread out, with 23.1% under the age of 18, 7.0% from 18 to 24, 27.6% from 25 to 44, 25.9% from 45 to 64, and 16.4% who were 65 years of age or older. The median age was 41 years. For every 100 females, there were 99.5 males. For every 100 females age 18 and over, there were 97.8 males.

The median income for a household in the township was $39,594, and the median income for a family was $47,452. Males had a median income of $34,853 versus $21,544 for females. The per capita income for the township was $19,011. About 4.1% of families and 7.0% of the population were below the poverty line, including 9.1% of those under age 18 and 3.9% of those age 65 or over.

== Education ==
The Ellwood City Area School District serves the township.

== Transportation ==
=== Major roads and highways ===
- PA 65
- PA 288
- PA 351
- PA 488
