= Ellwood City, Pennsylvania =

Borough of Pennsylvania, US

- Borough
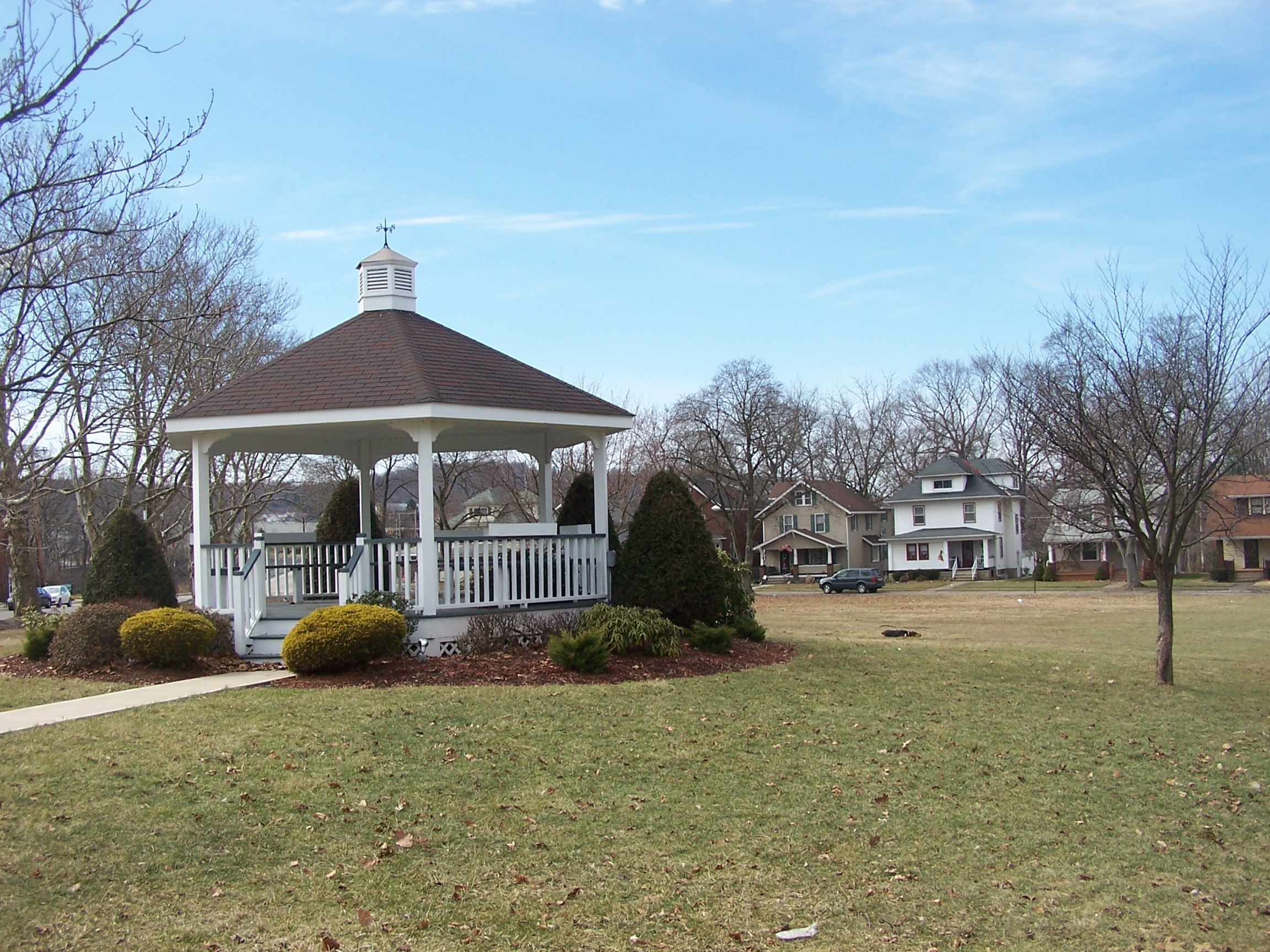
- Ewing Park in Ellwood City

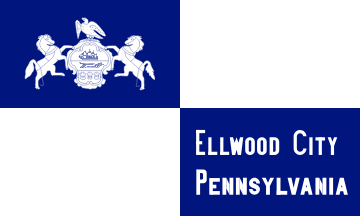
- Flag Seal
- Motto: "Changing Lives, Living Change"
- Interactive map of Ellwood City, Pennsylvania
- Location within Pennsylvania Location within the United States
- Coordinates: 40°51′40″N 80°17′5″W
- Country: United States
- State: Pennsylvania
- Counties: Lawrence, Beaver
- Established: 1892; 134 years ago
- Named for: Isaac L. Ellwood

Government
  - Mayor: Tony Court

Area
  - Total: 2.36 sq mi (6.11 km^{2})
  - Land: 2.32 sq mi (6.02 km^{2})
  - Water: 0.035 sq mi (0.09 km^{2})
- Elevation: 883 ft (269 m)

Population (2020)
  - Total: 7,642
  - Density: 3,288.2/sq mi (1,269.58/km^{2})
- Time zone: UTC-5 (Eastern (EST))
  - Summer (DST): UTC-4 (EDT)
- ZIP code: 16117
- Area codes: 724, 878
- FIPS code: 42-23304
- GNIS feature ID: 1211951
- Website: www.ellwoodcityborough.com

Ellwood City is a borough primarily in Lawrence County, Pennsylvania, United States. With a small district extending into Beaver County, it lies along the Connoquenessing Creek just east of its confluence with the Beaver River. The population was 7,642 at the 2020 census. Ellwood City lies 30 miles (48 km) northwest of Pittsburgh and 8 miles (13 km) southeast of New Castle within the Pittsburgh metropolitan area.

== History ==
In the past, Ellwood City sustained many heavy industries such as steel tube mills, steel car works, building stone and limestone quarries, foundries and machine shops, and coal mining. Ellwood City is named after businessman Isaac L. Ellwood.

== Geography ==
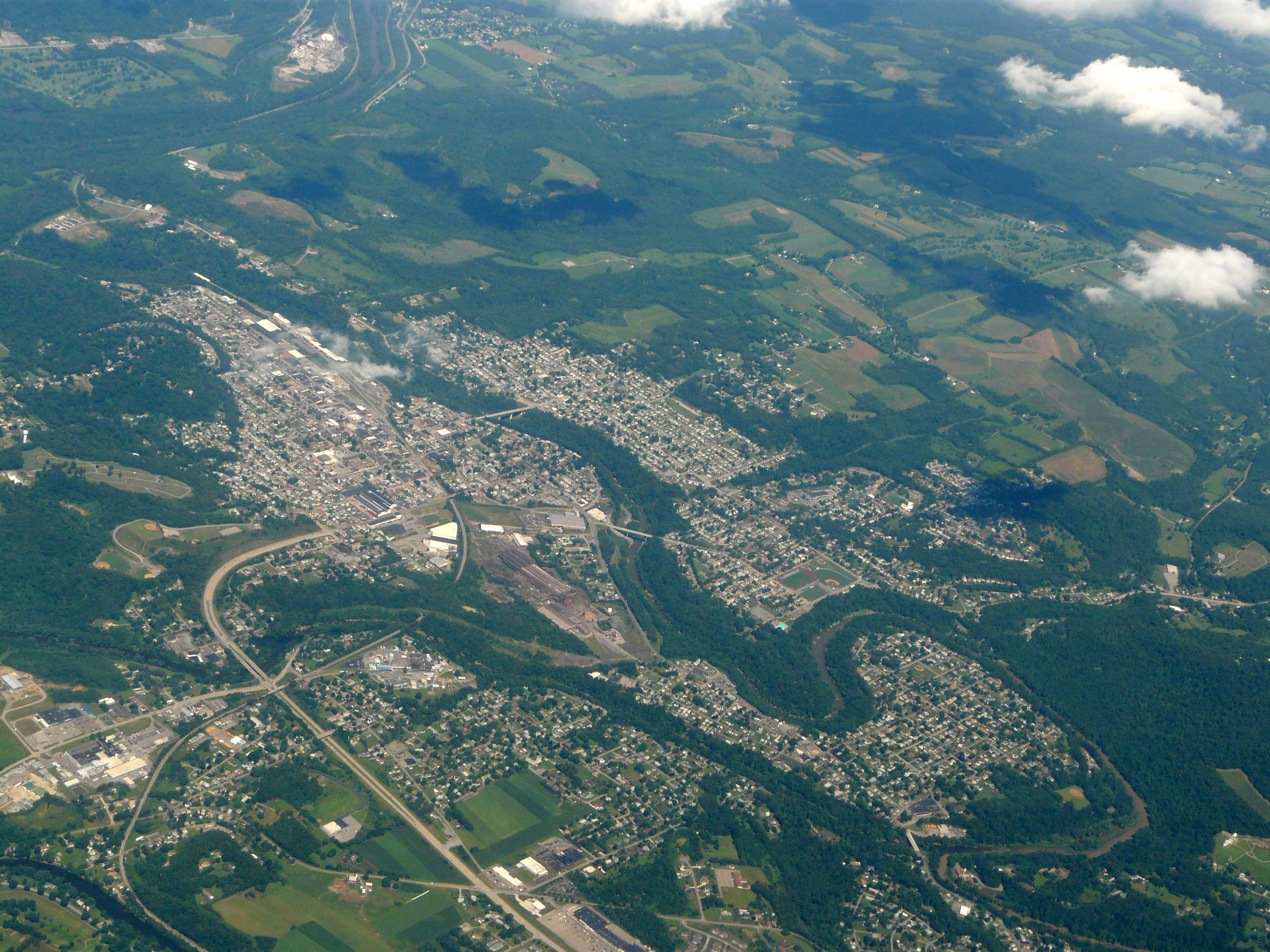
Ellwood City from the air

Ellwood City is located at 40°51′40″N 80°17′05″W (40.860983, -80.284849). According to the United States Census Bureau, the borough has a total area of 2.4 square miles (6.2 km^{2}), of which 2.3 square miles (6.0 km^{2}) is land and 0.1 square miles (0.26 km^{2}), or 2.09%, is water.

The (roughly) 0.3 mile-diameter Pittsburgh Circle within the city was once a bicycle-racing track, as the city historically manufactured steel for bicycles.

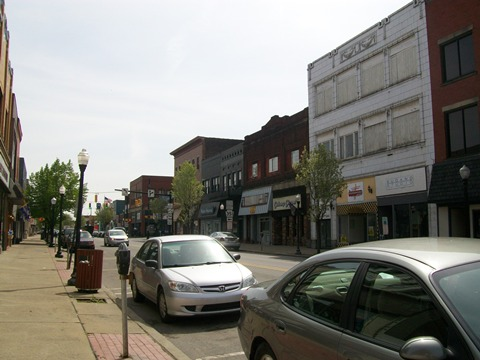
Downtown Ellwood City PA

== Demographics ==
Historical population
Census	Pop.	Note	%±
1900	2,243		—
1910	3,902		74.0%
1920	8,958		129.6%
1930	12,323		37.6%
1940	12,329		0.0%
1950	12,945		5.0%
1960	12,413		−4.1%
1970	10,857		−12.5%
1980	9,998		−7.9%
1990	8,894		−11.0%
2000	8,688		−2.3%
2010	7,921		−8.8%
2020	7,642		−3.5%
2021 (est.)	7,564	▼	−1.0%

As of the census of 2000, there were 8,688 people, 3,716 households, and 2,393 families residing in the borough. The population density was 3,716.6 inhabitants per square mile (1,435.0/km^{2}). There were 4,006 housing units at an average density of 1,713.7 units per square mile (661.7 units/km^{2}). The racial makeup of the borough was 98.22% White, 0.81% African American, 0.09% Native American, 0.23% Asian, 0.18% from other races, and 0.47% from two or more races. Hispanic or Latino of any race were 0.60% of the population. In 2022, Jan Williams would become the first woman of Asian descent to be sworn into council.

There were 3,716 households, out of which 26.6% had children under the age of 18 living with them, 47.3% were married couples living together, 12.6% had a female householder with no husband present, and 35.6% were non-families. Of all households, 32.3% were made up of individuals, and 18.2% had someone living alone who was 65 years of age or older. The average household size was 2.32 and the average family size was 2.94.

In the borough the population was spread out, with 22.5% under the age of 18, 7.7% from 18 to 24, 26.5% from 25 to 44, 21.2% from 45 to 64, and 22.1% who were 65 years of age or older. The median age was 41 years. For every 100 females, there were 86.9 males. For every 100 females age 18 and over, there were 83.4 males.

The median income for a household in the borough was $28,926, and the median income for a family was $40,758. Males had a median income of $31,703 versus $21,285 for females. The per capita income for the borough was $15,784. About 8.6% of families and 12.3% of the population were below the poverty line, including 15.9% of those under age 18 and 11.1% of those age 65 or over.

The population at the 2010 census was 7,921, a change of -8.8% since 2000. There were 3,721 males (47.0%) and 4,200 females (53.0%). The median age was 42.0 years, compared to 40.1 for the state of Pennsylvania.

The estimated median household income in 2007 was $35,555 (it was $28,926 in 2000), while in Pennsylvania it was $48,576. Estimated per capita income in 2007 was $18,674 in Ellwood City, versus $26,228 for the entire state. Estimated median house or condo value in 2007 was $91,245 (it was $75,700 in 2000), versus $155,000 for the state.

== Education ==
The Ellwood City Area School District serves the borough.

== Transportation ==
=== Major roads and highways ===
- PA 65
- PA 288
- PA 351
- PA 488

== Notable people ==
- Jim Gerlach, former U.S. Representative from Pennsylvania's 6th district
- Princess Ileana of Romania, youngest daughter of King Ferdinand I of Romania and his consort, Queen Marie of Romania
- Donnie Iris, rock musician known for his work with The Jaggerz and Wild Cherry, as well as his solo work
- Stephen Johns, former professional ice hockey defenseman for the Dallas Stars
- Sean Miller, men's college basketball coach for Texas University
- Matt Osborne, professional wrestler known for his persona, Doink the Clown
- Leslie H. Sabo, Jr., Vietnam War hero; posthumously received the Medal of Honor after 40-year lag period
- Debra Todd, Chief Justice of the Supreme Court of Pennsylvania
- Hack Wilson, Major League Baseball player and Baseball Hall of Fame member
- George Zeber, former professional baseball player for the New York Yankees

== In popular culture ==
The PBS Kids TV series Arthur takes place in the fictional town of Elwood City, based on and similar to the real Ellwood City.
