= Lawrence County, Pennsylvania =

County in Pennsylvania, United States

- County
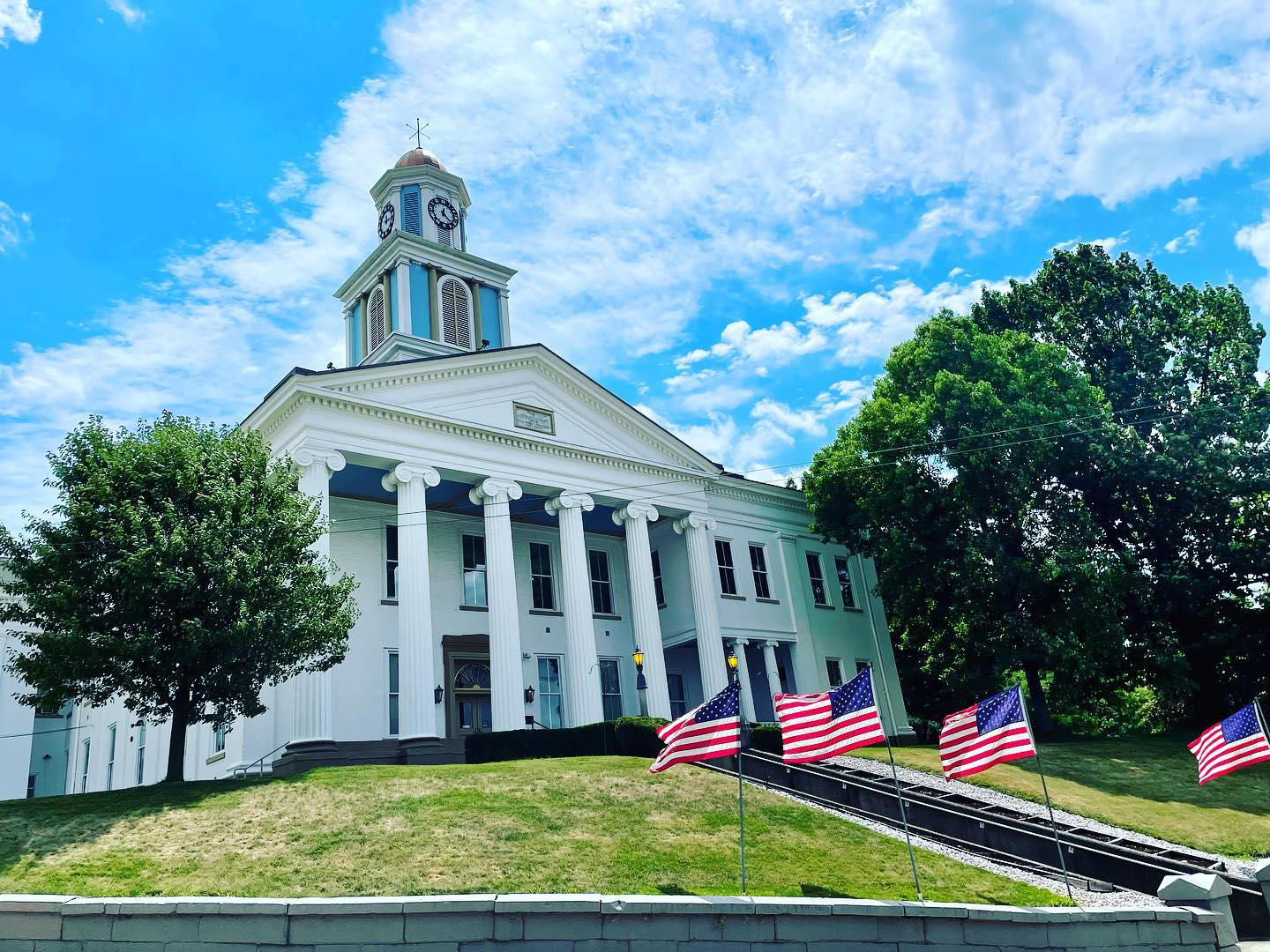
- Lawrence County Courthouse

- Flag Seal

- Location within the U.S. state of Pennsylvania
- Coordinates: 40°59′N 80°20′W
- Country: United States
- State: Pennsylvania
- Founded: March 20, 1849
- Named for: USS Lawrence
- Seat: New Castle
- Largest city: New Castle

Area
  - Total: 363 sq mi (940 km^{2})
  - Land: 358 sq mi (930 km^{2})
  - Water: 4.5 sq mi (12 km^{2}) 1.3%

Population (2020)
  - Total: 86,070
  - Estimate (2025): 83,911 ▼
  - Density: 235/sq mi (91/km^{2})
- Time zone: UTC−5 (Eastern)
  - Summer (DST): UTC−4 (EDT)
- Congressional district: 16th
- Website: lawrencecountypa.gov

Lawrence County is a county in the Commonwealth of Pennsylvania. As of the 2020 census, the population was 86,070. The county seat and largest city is New Castle.

The county was created on March 20, 1849, from parts of Beaver and Mercer counties. The county is part of the Greater Pittsburgh region of the commonwealth. (Note: Includes Allegheny, Washington, Butler, Beaver, Lawrence and Armstrong Counties)

== History ==
Lawrence County was created on March 20, 1849, from parts of Beaver and Mercer counties due to the rapid growth of New Castle, which was primarily in Mercer County but was rapidly expanding into Beaver County. The former borders between Beaver and Mercer Counties are still evident in Lawrence County today, as the northern borders of North Beaver Township, Shenango Township, and Slippery Rock Township with (respectively) the southern borders of Mahoning Township, Hickory Township, and Scott Township make up the former boundaries between Beaver and Mercer Counties. In addition, County Line Road in New Castle where the Lawrence County Courthouse is located also marks the former boundaries.

The county was named after the flagship of Commodore Oliver Hazard Perry, the USS Lawrence, which was disabled in the September 10, 1813 Battle of Lake Erie during the War of 1812. The ship's complement included local raw recruits. That niagara-class brig (more correctly: snow) was itself a namesake, of Perry's friend and naval officer James Lawrence, who died during the War of 1812.

=== Lawrence County Flag ===
In August 1981, county commissioner Paul L. Tanner proposed the creation of a flag for Lawrence County as well as a flag for each of the county's 27 municipalities These were to be displayed at the courthouse. Over the next few months, flags for Perry Township, New Beaver Borough, and Wampum Borough were presented to the commissioners

On January 12, 1982, commissioner chairman, Frank A. Vitril, announced a county flag design contest and asked residents of Lawrence County to submit entries on an 8.5 by 11 inch sheet of paper with their name, address, and telephone number on an attached sheet of paper. The winner would receive $100 prize contributed in equal parts from the county commissioners and would not come from taxpayers. They also announced the formation of a committee, coordinated by the Lawrence County Planning Commission, to select the winner. The commissioners said in a statement, "As public officials, we are aware of the need to generate public spirit and interest in the affairs of local government. The promotion of a county flag will enable interested citizens (schools, art groups, etc.) of Lawrence County participation in an historic event."

Flag of Lawrence County, adopted June 15, 1982

The winning flag was announced on June 4, 1982, and a ceremony was held at the courthouse on June 15, 1982, in observance of Flag Day, as the courthouse was closed on June 14. Rosemary Ann Marino, a commercial artist from New Castle, submitted several designs and her winning entry was one of 43 designs submitted by 15 individuals. The design depicts the shape of Lawrence County in green and edged with gold off-center on a white background with the words "Lawrence County, Pennsylvania" emblazoned on the bottom. The center logo features a shaft of wheat, symbolizing prosperity, against a background of rolling farmlands on the left and waves of water on the right. Marino received a check for $100 at a ceremony at the courthouse as well as a telegraph from Governor Dick Thornburgh who congratulated Lawrence County on its new flag.

A painting of the design was revealed at the ceremony and was painted on masonite by Harry Broschart, who was on the flag selection committee. He and other committee members, Dominic Caminite and former director of arts and crafts at West Side Community Center, Virginia Rankin, gave the award presentations. Honorable mentions included a covered bridge design by Grayce D. Sharek, a blue and gold circular design stating "Lawrence County, Government for the People, founded 1849" by Betty Stone, an outline of the courthouse against a red keystone on a blue background by Steve T. Grala, and a two-tone green flag with an outline of the county by James E. Hamilton. Entries were judged based on originality, creativity, theme, clarity, and design.

President Judge Glenn McCracken offered remarks urging those present to take pride in their home, Lawrence County, and the flag which symbolizes it, and saying Lawrence County needs the kind of American pride in their heredity that was reawakened by the television show Roots.

== Geography ==
According to the U.S. Census Bureau, the county has a total area of 363 square miles (940 km^{2}), of which 358 square miles (930 km^{2}) is land and 4.5 square miles (12 km^{2}) (1.3%) is water. Major waterways are the Shenango River, Neshannock Creek and the Mahoning River which form the Beaver River. Also, the Slippery Rock Creek and Connoquenessing Creak empty into the Beaver River. Lawrence County is one of the 423 counties served by the Appalachian Regional Commission, and it is identified as part of the "Midlands" by Colin Woodard in his book American Nations: A History of the Eleven Rival Regional Cultures of North America.

=== Climate ===
Lawrence County has a hot-summer humid continental climate (Dfa). Average monthly temperatures in New Castle range from 27.7 °F in January to 72.2 °F in July.

=== Adjacent counties ===
- Mercer County (north)
- Butler County (east)
- Beaver County (south)
- Columbiana County, Ohio (southwest)
- Mahoning County, Ohio (west)

== Demographics ==
Historical population
Census	Pop.	Note	%±
1850	21,079		—
1860	22,999		9.1%
1870	27,298		18.7%
1880	33,312		22.0%
1890	37,517		12.6%
1900	57,042		52.0%
1910	70,032		22.8%
1920	85,545		22.2%
1930	97,258		13.7%
1940	96,877		−0.4%
1950	105,120		8.5%
1960	112,965		7.5%
1970	107,374		−4.9%
1980	107,150		−0.2%
1990	96,246		−10.2%
2000	94,643		−1.7%
2010	91,108		−3.7%
2020	86,070		−5.5%
2025 (est.)	83,911	▼	−2.5%

=== Racial and ethnic composition ===
Lawrence County, Pennsylvania – Racial and ethnic composition Note: the US Census treats Hispanic/Latino as an ethnic category. This table excludes Latinos from the racial categories and assigns them to a separate category. Hispanics/Latinos may be of any race.
Race / Ethnicity (NH = Non-Hispanic)	Pop 1980	Pop 1990	Pop 2000	Pop 2010	Pop 2020	% 1980	% 1990	% 2000	% 2010	% 2020
White alone (NH)	103,398	92,645	89,573	84,872	75,811	96.50%	96.26%	94.64%	93.16%	88.08%
Black or African American alone (NH)	3,037	2,894	3,393	3,448	3,546	2.83%	3.01%	3.59%	3.78%	4.12%
Native American or Alaska Native alone (NH)	45	54	81	54	75	0.04%	0.06%	0.09%	0.06%	0.09%
Asian alone (NH)	174	257	254	365	321	0.16%	0.27%	0.27%	0.40%	0.37%
Native Hawaiian or Pacific Islander alone (NH)	x	x	4	9	4	x	x	0.00%	0.01%	0.00%
Other race alone (NH)	122	39	67	69	251	0.11%	0.04%	0.07%	0.08%	0.29%
Mixed race or Multiracial (NH)	x	x	742	1,360	4,407	x	x	0.78%	1.49%	5.12%
Hispanic or Latino (any race)	374	357	529	931	1,655	0.35%	0.37%	0.56%	1.02%	1.92%
Total	107,150	96,246	94,643	91,108	86,070	100.00%	100.00%	100.00%	100.00%	100.00%

=== 2020 census ===
As of the 2020 census, the county had a population of 86,070. The median age was 45.5 years. 19.8% of residents were under the age of 18 and 22.7% of residents were 65 years of age or older. For every 100 females there were 94.8 males, and for every 100 females age 18 and over there were 93.1 males age 18 and over.

The racial makeup of the county was 88.7% White, 4.3% Black or African American, 0.1% American Indian and Alaska Native, 0.4% Asian, <0.1% Native Hawaiian and Pacific Islander, 0.8% from some other race, and 5.8% from two or more races. Hispanic or Latino residents of any race comprised 1.9% of the population.

57.6% of residents lived in urban areas, while 42.4% lived in rural areas.

There were 35,939 households in the county, of which 25.5% had children under the age of 18 living in them. Of all households, 46.3% were married-couple households, 18.9% were households with a male householder and no spouse or partner present, and 27.9% were households with a female householder and no spouse or partner present. About 30.6% of all households were made up of individuals and 15.5% had someone living alone who was 65 years of age or older.

There were 39,492 housing units, of which 9.0% were vacant. Among occupied housing units, 73.6% were owner-occupied and 26.4% were renter-occupied. The homeowner vacancy rate was 1.9% and the rental vacancy rate was 8.2%.

=== 2000 census ===
As of the 2000 census there were 94,643 people, 37,091 households, and 25,889 families residing in the county. The population density was 263 inhabitants per square mile (102/km^{2}). There were 39,635 housing units at an average density of 110 units per square mile (42/km^{2}). The racial makeup of the county was 94.98% White, 3.61% Black or African American, 0.10% Native American, 0.27% Asian, 0.01% Pacific Islander, 0.19% from other races, and 0.84% from two or more races. 0.56% of the population were Hispanic or Latino of any race. 34.2% English or Welsh, 14.6% were of Italian, 12.4% American, 9.0% German, 8.1% Irish, and 6.8% Scotch-Irish, 2.5% Polish, and 1.9% African ancestry.

There were 37,091 households, out of which 28.80% had children under the age of 18 living with them, 54.50% were married couples living together, 11.50% had a female householder with no husband present, and 30.20% were non-families. 27.00% of all households were made up of individuals, and 14.40% had someone living alone who was 65 years of age or older. The average household size was 2.47 and the average family size was 3.00.

In the county, the population was spread out, with 23.10% under the age of 18, 8.30% from 18 to 24, 25.70% from 25 to 44, 23.60% from 45 to 64, and 19.30% who were 65 years of age or older. The median age was 40 years. For every 100 females, there were 90.60 males. For every 100 females age 18 and over, there were 86.90 males.

== Micropolitan Statistical Area ==
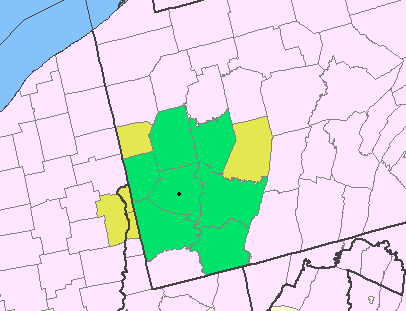
Map of the Pittsburgh-New Castle-Weirton, PA-OH-WV Combined Statistical Area (CSA)

The United States Office of Management and Budget has designated Lawrence County as the New Castle, PA Micropolitan Statistical Area (MSA). As of the 2010 U.S. census the micropolitan area ranked 3rd most populous in the State of Pennsylvania and the 48th most populous in the United States with a population of 91,108. Lawrence County is also a part of the Pittsburgh–New Castle–Weirton combined statistical area (CSA), which combines the population of Lawrence, and Allegheny, Armstrong, Beaver, Butler, Fayette, Indiana, Washington, and Westmoreland Counties in Pennsylvania. In West Virginia, the counties included are Brooke and Hancock. And in Ohio, Jefferson County. The combined statistical area ranked the fourth most populous in Pennsylvania and 20th most populous in the U.S. with a population of 2,660,727.

== Government and politics ==
=== Voter registration ===
As of June 30, 2025, there are 57,172 registered voters in Lawrence County. Republicans hold a majority of voters. There were 29,982 registered Republicans, 19,890 registered Democrats, 5,348 registered non-affiliated voters, and 1,952 voters registered to other parties.

Chart of Voter Registration
1. Republican (52.4%)
2. Democratic (34.8%)
3. Independent (9.35%)
4. Third Party (3.41%)

Voter registration and party enrollment
Party	Number of voters	Percentage
Republican	29,982	52.44%
Democratic	19,890	34.79%
Independent	5,348	9.35%
Third Party	1,952	3.41%
Total	57,172	100%

2024 Presidential Election Shaded by City and Township Trump: 50–60% 60–70% 70–80% 80–90% Harris: 50–60%

United States presidential election results for Lawrence County, Pennsylvania
Year	Republican		Democratic		Third party(ies)	
Year	No.	%	No.	%	No.	%
1888	4,342	62.56%	2,113	30.44%	486	7.00%
1892	4,385	60.10%	2,336	32.02%	575	7.88%
1896	6,228	65.13%	3,013	31.51%	321	3.36%
1900	6,343	61.39%	2,754	26.66%	1,235	11.95%
1904	7,634	66.35%	1,894	16.46%	1,978	17.19%
1908	5,350	54.06%	2,656	26.84%	1,890	19.10%
1912	2,128	21.62%	1,976	20.07%	5,741	58.31%
1916	5,134	49.44%	3,966	38.19%	1,285	12.37%
1920	9,448	64.38%	2,720	18.53%	2,508	17.09%
1924	12,533	64.58%	1,880	9.69%	4,993	25.73%
1928	20,012	74.95%	6,417	24.03%	273	1.02%
1932	13,064	55.10%	9,390	39.61%	1,255	5.29%
1936	15,458	40.58%	21,994	57.74%	638	1.67%
1940	19,361	50.41%	18,814	48.99%	230	0.60%
1944	18,886	51.57%	17,331	47.33%	403	1.10%
1948	17,186	52.72%	14,632	44.88%	781	2.40%
1952	23,319	52.12%	21,164	47.31%	255	0.57%
1956	25,037	55.61%	19,923	44.25%	65	0.14%
1960	23,646	49.20%	24,309	50.58%	109	0.23%
1964	15,998	35.39%	29,092	64.35%	117	0.26%
1968	18,360	42.60%	21,027	48.78%	3,716	8.62%
1972	23,712	56.06%	17,595	41.60%	990	2.34%
1976	18,546	43.49%	23,337	54.73%	757	1.78%
1980	18,404	45.77%	19,506	48.51%	2,303	5.73%
1984	19,277	44.43%	23,981	55.27%	128	0.30%
1988	15,829	41.76%	21,884	57.74%	191	0.50%
1992	12,359	30.00%	20,830	50.55%	8,014	19.45%
1996	13,088	36.10%	18,993	52.38%	4,178	11.52%
2000	18,060	45.56%	20,593	51.95%	987	2.49%
2004	21,938	50.50%	21,387	49.23%	117	0.27%
2008	21,851	51.60%	19,711	46.54%	787	1.86%
2012	21,047	53.71%	17,513	44.69%	629	1.61%
2016	25,428	61.90%	14,009	34.11%	1,639	3.99%
2020	29,597	64.08%	15,978	34.59%	612	1.33%
2024	31,347	66.34%	15,440	32.67%	468	0.99%

United States Senate election results for Lawrence County, Pennsylvania1
Year	Republican		Democratic		Third party(ies)	
Year	No.	%	No.	%	No.	%
1994	14,287	46.22%	15,297	49.48%	1,330	4.30%
2000	17,672	45.00%	21,026	53.55%	569	1.45%
2006	13,368	42.03%	18,436	57.97%	0	0.00%
2012	19,353	50.08%	18,603	48.14%	689	1.78%
2018	17,375	54.05%	14,324	44.56%	448	1.39%
2024	29,405	62.84%	16,176	34.57%	1,211	2.59%

United States Senate election results for Lawrence County, Pennsylvania3
Year	Republican		Democratic		Third party(ies)	
Year	No.	%	No.	%	No.	%
1992	16,707	41.19%	21,718	53.55%	2,132	5.26%
1998	14,000	53.89%	11,167	42.98%	813	3.13%
2004	20,821	52.26%	18,010	45.20%	1,012	2.54%
2010	15,493	55.71%	12,317	44.29%	0	0.00%
2016	22,674	56.29%	15,289	37.96%	2,317	5.75%
2022	21,531	60.64%	13,758	38.75%	217	0.61%

Pennsylvania Gubernatorial election results for Lawrence County
Year	Republican		Democratic		Third party(ies)	
Year	No.	%	No.	%	No.	%
1970	14,142	42.36%	18,497	55.41%	744	2.23%
1974	15,655	49.00%	15,838	49.58%	453	1.42%
1978	11,874	35.89%	21,051	63.63%	157	0.47%
1982	15,345	41.92%	20,967	57.28%	295	0.81%
1986	12,189	38.41%	19,235	60.62%	307	0.97%
1990	7,282	27.05%	19,563	72.66%	80	0.30%
1994	13,102	42.83%	13,355	43.66%	4,135	13.52%
1998	13,115	51.46%	9,259	36.33%	3,110	12.20%
2002	13,010	46.25%	14,628	52.01%	489	1.74%
2006	14,329	44.94%	17,557	55.06%	0	0.00%
2010	16,489	58.91%	11,499	41.09%	0	0.00%
2014	11,166	48.21%	11,996	51.79%	0	0.00%
2018	16,714	51.84%	15,035	46.63%	492	1.53%
2022	19,611	54.03%	16,023	44.15%	660	1.82%

=== County commissioners ===
Lawrence County is administered by a three-member publicly elected commission. Each commissioner serves in four-year terms. Elections occur in the odd-numbered years that precede U.S. presidential elections. All three Commissioners are chosen in the same election, and voters may vote for no more than two of the candidates. By state law, the commission must have a minority party guaranteeing a political split on the commission. The Commissioners are responsible for the management of the fiscal and administrative functions of the county.

Commissioner	Party	Title
Dan Vogler	Republican	Chairman
Chris Sainato	Democratic	
Dan Kennedy	Republican	

=== County row offices ===
Office	Official	Party
Controller	Dave Prestopine	Republican
Coroner	Richard Johnson	Democratic
District Attorney	Joshua Lamancusa	Democratic
Prothonotary and Clerk of Courts	Jodi Klabon-Esoldo	Democratic
Register of Wills and Recorder of Deeds	Tammy Crawford	Republican
Sheriff	Perry Quahliero	Democratic
Treasurer	Richard L. Rapone	Democratic

=== State House of Representatives ===
District	Representative	Party
8	Aaron Bernstine	Republican
9	Marla Brown	Republican

=== State Senators ===
District	Senator	Party
47	Elder Vogel	Republican
50	Michele Brooks	Republican

=== United States House of Representatives ===
District	Representative	Party
16	Mike Kelly	Republican

=== United States Senate ===
Senator	Party
John Fetterman	Democrat
Dave McCormick	Republican

== Education ==
=== Colleges and universities ===
- Westminster College - New Wilmington

=== Community, junior, and technical colleges ===
- Butler Community College Lawrence Crossing Campus

=== Public school districts ===
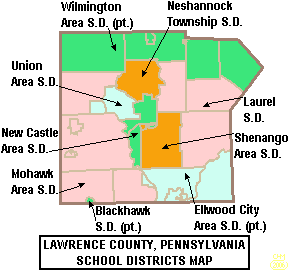
Map of Lawrence County, Pennsylvania Public School Districts

- Blackhawk School District (part)
- Ellwood City Area School District (part)
- Laurel School District
- Mohawk Area School District
- Neshannock Township School District
- New Castle Area School District
- Shenango School District
- Union Area School District
- Wilmington Area School District (part)

=== Tech schools ===
- Lawrence County Career Technology Center - Shenango Township
- New Castle School of Trades - Union Township

=== Private schools ===
- Apple Grove School - New Wilmington
- Cherry Hill School - New Wilmington
- Cotton School - New Wilmington
- Ellwood City Children's Center, Inc.
- Faith Country Chapel Preschool and Kindergarten - New Castle
- Fayette School - Volant
- Hillside Parochial School - New Wilmington
- Indian Run School - New Wilmington
- J R Wilson School - New Wilmington
- Ligo School - New Wilmington
- Little Beaver Parochial School - Enon Valley
- Lusk School - Volant
- Meadow Lark School - New Wilmington
- New Castle Christian Academy - New Castle
- Parents Preschool Ellwood City
- Shepherd School - Volant
- St Vitus Catholic School - New Castle
- Thorn Hill School - Volant
- Westminster Preschool - New Wilmington

According to data provided at Pennsylvania EdNA

=== Libraries ===
- Ellwood City Area Public Library
- F D Campbell Memorial Library - Bessemer
- Lawrence County Federated Library System - New Castle
- New Castle Public Library

== Transportation ==
=== Airports ===
- New Castle Municipal Airport

=== Public transit ===
- New Castle Area Transit Authority

=== Major roads and highways ===
- I-76 / Penna Turnpike
- I-79
- I-376
- US 19
- US 224
- US 422
- US 422 Bus.
- PA 18
- PA 65
- PA 108
- PA 158
- PA 168
- PA 208
- PA 288
- PA 317
- PA 351
- PA 388
- PA 488
- PA 551
- PA 956

== Recreation ==
=== Parks ===
- Cascade Park (New Castle)
- Ewing Park (Ellwood City)
- Gaston Park (New Castle)
- McConnells Mill State Park (Slippery Rock Twp)
- Pearson Park (Neshannock Twp)
- West Park Nature Center (Union Twp)
- Marti Park
- New Wilmington Borough Park

=== State game lands ===
- SGL 148 (New Beaver)
- SGL 150 (Pulaski Twp)
- SGL 151 (Washington Twp near Volant)
- SGL 178 (Neshannock Twp north of New Castle)
- SGL 216 (Scott Twp near Harlansburg)

=== Trails ===
- North Country Trail (entire trail)
- North Country Trail (local)
- Stavich Bike Trail
- Neshannock Creek Trail

== Communities ==
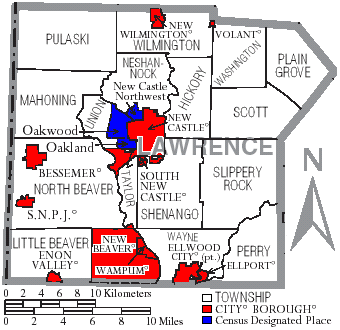
Map of Lawrence County, Pennsylvania with Municipal Labels showing Cities and Boroughs (red), Townships (white), and Census-designated places (blue).

Under Pennsylvania law, there are four types of incorporated municipalities: cities, boroughs, townships, and, in at most two cases, towns. The following cities, boroughs and townships are located in Lawrence County:

=== Cities ===
- New Castle (county seat)

=== Boroughs ===
- Bessemer
- Ellport
- Ellwood City (partially in Beaver County)
- Enon Valley
- New Beaver
- New Wilmington
- S.N.P.J.
- Volant
- Wampum

=== Townships ===
- Hickory
- Little Beaver
- Mahoning
- Neshannock
- North Beaver
- Perry
- Plain Grove
- Pulaski
- Scott
- Shenango
- Slippery Rock
- Taylor
- Union
- Washington
- Wayne
- Wilmington

=== Census-designated places ===
Census-designated places are geographical areas designated by the U.S. Census Bureau for the purposes of compiling demographic data. They are not actual jurisdictions under Pennsylvania law. Other unincorporated communities, such as villages, may be listed here as well.

- Chewton
- Frizzleburg
- Mount Jackson
- New Bedford
- New Castle Northwest
- Oakland
- Oakwood
- West Pittsburg

=== Unincorporated communities ===
Various unincorporated communities that lie within and are part of official municipalities.

- Altman
- Belmar Park
- Brent
- Burnstown
- Castlewood
- Coaltown
- Coaltown Hill
- Cottage Grove
- Coverts
- Derringer Corners
- Drake
- Duckrun
- Eastbrook
- East New Castle
- Edinburg
- Elliott Mills
- Energy
- Fayette
- Gibsondale
- Grant City
- Harbor
- Harbor Bridge
- Harlansburg
- Hillsville
- Jackson Knolls Gardens
- Joyce
- Lawrence Junction
- Mahoningtown
- McCaslin
- McConnells Mill
- Moravia
- Mount Air
- Nashua
- Neshannock Falls
- New Castle Junction
- Newburg
- Newpoint
- North Edinburg
- Old Enon
- Park Gate
- Parkstown
- Peanut
- Possum Hollow
- Princeton
- Pulaski
- Robinson
- Rockville
- Rose Point
- Sheep Hill
- Skidmore
- Sunnyside
- Sunset Valley
- Villa Maria
- Walmo
- Westview Heights
- Wiegletown
- Willow Grove
- Wurtemberg

=== Former community ===
- Big Beaver Borough became a borough on March 7, 1958. Until that date, it was known as Big Beaver Township, which was formed in 1802 when South Beaver Township was divided. In 1849, when Lawrence County was created, the new county line split Big Beaver leaving a township of that name in each county. Big Beaver in Lawrence County is now known as New Beaver Borough.

- South New Castle Borough became a borough on April 1, 1901. It was annexed by Shenango Township on January 1, 2026.

=== Population ranking ===
The population ranking of the following table is based on the 2010 census of Lawrence County.

† county seat

Rank	City/Town/etc.	Municipal type	Population (2010 Census)
1	† New Castle	City	23,273
2	Ellwood City (partially in Beaver County)	Borough	7,921
3	New Wilmington	Borough	2,466
4	Oakwood	CDP	2,270
5	Oakland	CDP	1,569
6	New Beaver	Borough	1,502
7	New Castle Northwest	CDP	1,413
8	Ellport	Borough	1,180
9	Bessemer	Borough	1,111
10	New Bedford	CDP	925
11	West Pittsburg	CDP	808
12	Wampum	Borough	717
13	South New Castle	Borough	709
14	Frizzleburg	CDP	602
15	Chewton	CDP	488
16	Enon Valley	Borough	306
17	Volant	Borough	168
18	S.N.P.J.	Borough	19

== Notable people ==
- W. Thomas Andrews – former Pennsylvania state senator
- Joseph Baldwin – educator
- Charlie Bennett – Major League Baseball catcher for four teams
- John Blangero – human geneticist; highly cited scientist in the field of complex disease genetics
- Charles Joseph Carter – magician
- George Chip – middleweight boxing champion of the world from 1913 to 1914
- William C. Chip – Major general, USMC, son of George Chip
- Ben Ciccone – NFL player for the Pittsburgh Steelers
- Ralph J. Cicerone – scientist, president of the National Academy of Sciences
- Bruce Clark – professional football player with the New Orleans Saints and Kansas City Chiefs and Penn State All-American
- Jack Cole – cartoonist and creator of the superhero Plastic Man
- Paul Cuba – American football player
- Nick DeCarbo – NFL player
- Matt DeSalvo – Major League Baseball starting pitcher with the Florida Marlins and formerly the New York Yankees and Atlanta Braves
- Darrell Dess – former football player for the Pittsburgh Steelers, the New York Giants, and the Washington Redskins
- Thomas Fee – former member of the U.S. House of Representatives
- Israel Gaither – National Commander of The Salvation Army in the United States, the first black person to serve in that capacity
- Helen Thornton Geer – prominent librarian and academic
- Louis E. Graham – former member of the U.S. House of Representatives
- Edmond Hamilton – prolific science fiction author writing chiefly in the genre described as space opera
- Gabbie Hanna – YouTuber, singer and author
- Malik Hooker – Indianapolis Colts safety, drafted 15th pick in 2017
- Donnie Iris – rock singer and guitarist, best known for his work with the Jaggerz, Wild Cherry and Donnie Iris and the Cruisers.
- Francis Jackson – born free (circa 1815 to 1820), he was kidnapped in 1850 and sold into slavery and was finally freed in 1855 with the resolution of Francis Jackson v. John W. Deshazer.
- Oscar Lawrence Jackson – former member of the U.S. House of Representatives
- John Kiriakou – former CIA operative who in 2007 was the first to admit that the agency used waterboarding as a form of interrogation
- Charles McMeen Kurtz – art critic, writer, museum curator
- Donald N. Levine – sociologist, educator, social theorist and writer
- Mark Mangino – former head coach of the University of Kansas football team
- Mike Marshall – musician
- Scott McCurley – NFL assistant coach with the Green Bay Packers
- Bill McPeak – football player and National Football League coach
- Andrew R. Morgan – US astronaut, selected in 2013
- Lance Nimmo – NFL player with Tampa Bay Buccaneers, New York Jets, Cleveland Browns, New England Patriots
- Thomas Wharton Phillips – former member of the U.S. House of Representatives
- Rick Razzano – professional football player
- Trent Reznor – lead singer for industrial rock band Nine Inch Nails
- Christopher Sainato – former member of the Pennsylvania House of Representatives
- Ira D. Sankey – gospel singer and composer
- Raymond P. Shafer – 39th governor of Pennsylvania from 1967 to 1971
- Frank Shields – former Oregon state senator
- John W. Slayton – prominent socialist and labor union leader
- Robert Sterling – film and television actor who starred in many films including the 1951 MGM hit Show Boat
- Chuck Tanner – former left fielder and manager in Major League Baseball, and skipper of the Pittsburgh Pirates' 1979 World Series champion team
- George Zambelli Sr. – American fireworks entertainer, and long-time president and manager of Zambelli Fireworks
- Jack Zduriencik – Seattle Mariners general manager, former Pittsburgh Pirates scout

== See also ==
- List of counties in Pennsylvania
- National Register of Historic Places listings in Lawrence County, Pennsylvania
- List of Pennsylvania state historical markers in Lawrence County
- USS Lawrence County
- New Castle News
- Jordan Brown case
