= 1936 United States presidential election in Pennsylvania =

- November 3, 1936

Nominee	Franklin D. Roosevelt	Alf Landon
Party	Democratic	Republican
Home state	New York	Kansas
Running mate	John Nance Garner	Frank Knox
Electoral vote	36	0
Popular vote	2,353,987	1,690,200
Percentage	56.88%	40.84%
County results
Roosevelt
40–50%
50–60%
60–70%
Landon
40–50%
50–60%
60–70%
President before election
Franklin D. Roosevelt
Democratic
Elected President
Franklin D. Roosevelt
Democratic

The 1936 United States presidential election in Pennsylvania took place on November 3, 1936, as part of the 1936 United States presidential election. Voters chose 36 representatives, or electors to the Electoral College, who voted for president and vice president.

Pennsylvania voted for the Democratic nominee, President Franklin D. Roosevelt, over the Republican nominee, Kansas Governor Alf Landon, by a large margin of 16.04%. After the state voted to re-elect incumbent Republican Herbert Hoover in 1932, Roosevelt became the first Democrat to win Pennsylvania since native son James Buchanan in 1856.

Roosevelt's victory marked the beginning of the state's shift from a Republican stronghold to a key swing state, and began a Democratic winning streak in the city of Philadelphia which has yet to be broken. Pennsylvania has backed the winning candidate in all but four presidential elections since (1948, 1968, 2000, and 2004).

As of the 2024 presidential election, this is the only election since 1856 in which Lebanon County has voted for a Democratic presidential candidate. Roosevelt became the first ever Democrat to win Blair County and Lawrence County, the first since Franklin Pierce in 1852 to win Armstrong County, and the first since James Buchanan in 1856 to win Dauphin County and Philadelphia County. Mifflin County voted Democratic for the first time since 1884.

== Results ==
1936 United States presidential election in Pennsylvania
Party	Candidate	Votes	Percentage	Electoral votes
Democratic	Franklin D. Roosevelt (incumbent)	2,353,987	56.88%	36
Republican	Alf Landon	1,690,200	40.84%	0
Royal Oak	William Lemke	67,468	1.63%	0
Socialist	Norman Thomas	14,599	0.35%	0
Prohibition	D. Leigh Colvin	6,687	0.16%	0
Communist	Earl Browder	4,061	0.10%	0
Industrial Labor	John Aiken	1,424	0.03%	0
Totals		4,138,426	100.00%	36

=== Results by county ===
County	Franklin D. Roosevelt Democratic		Alf Landon Republican		William Lemke Royal Oak		Various candidates Other parties		Margin		Total votes cast
County	#	%	#	%	#	%	#	%	#	%	Total votes cast
Adams	8,336	47.88%	8,313	47.75%	712	4.09%	49	0.28%	23	0.13%	17,410
Allegheny	366,593	65.21%	176,224	31.35%	16,182	2.88%	3,177	0.57%	190,369	33.86%	562,176
Armstrong	15,955	52.42%	14,198	46.65%	103	0.34%	178	0.58%	1,757	5.77%	30,434
Beaver	37,205	63.80%	20,223	34.68%	511	0.88%	373	0.64%	16,982	29.12%	58,312
Bedford	8,937	49.15%	9,014	49.58%	110	0.60%	121	0.67%	-77	-0.42%	18,182
Berks	56,907	64.43%	26,699	30.23%	1,879	2.13%	2,842	3.22%	30,208	34.20%	88,327
Blair	27,038	51.41%	24,711	46.98%	612	1.16%	236	0.45%	2,327	4.42%	52,597
Bradford	8,078	32.39%	16,643	66.74%	102	0.41%	113	0.45%	-8,565	-34.35%	24,936
Bucks	24,159	49.41%	23,860	48.80%	551	1.13%	325	0.66%	299	0.61%	48,895
Butler	16,008	48.06%	16,772	50.35%	288	0.86%	241	0.72%	-764	-2.29%	33,309
Cambria	46,687	64.57%	24,378	33.72%	958	1.32%	281	0.39%	22,309	30.85%	72,304
Cameron	1,538	45.44%	1,801	53.21%	26	0.77%	20	0.59%	-263	-7.77%	3,385
Carbon	14,179	54.93%	11,298	43.77%	234	0.91%	100	0.39%	2,881	11.16%	25,811
Centre	11,734	53.79%	9,869	45.24%	65	0.30%	146	0.67%	1,865	8.55%	21,814
Chester	26,676	47.11%	29,340	51.81%	385	0.68%	228	0.40%	-2,664	-4.70%	56,629
Clarion	8,412	48.94%	8,477	49.32%	184	1.07%	116	0.67%	-65	-0.38%	17,189
Clearfield	20,799	57.69%	14,531	40.31%	345	0.96%	375	1.04%	6,268	17.39%	36,050
Clinton	8,351	55.79%	6,479	43.28%	59	0.39%	80	0.53%	1,872	12.51%	14,969
Columbia	14,141	58.66%	9,674	40.13%	87	0.36%	206	0.85%	4,467	18.53%	24,108
Crawford	12,788	45.37%	14,463	51.31%	700	2.48%	238	0.84%	-1,675	-5.94%	28,189
Cumberland	18,850	55.41%	14,912	43.83%	67	0.20%	192	0.56%	3,938	11.58%	34,021
Dauphin	43,256	51.80%	39,598	47.42%	281	0.34%	365	0.44%	3,658	4.38%	83,500
Delaware	65,117	45.53%	74,899	52.37%	2,140	1.50%	857	0.60%	-9,782	-6.84%	143,013
Elk	9,035	57.80%	5,489	35.12%	1,039	6.65%	68	0.44%	3,546	22.69%	15,631
Erie	33,042	50.57%	25,607	39.19%	6,144	9.40%	552	0.84%	7,435	11.38%	65,345
Fayette	48,291	67.88%	21,984	30.90%	376	0.53%	493	0.69%	26,307	36.98%	71,144
Forest	1,157	39.18%	1,757	59.50%	23	0.78%	16	0.54%	-600	-20.32%	2,953
Franklin	15,632	53.15%	13,616	46.29%	61	0.21%	104	0.35%	2,016	6.85%	29,413
Fulton	2,431	53.65%	2,085	46.02%	0	0.00%	15	0.33%	346	7.64%	4,531
Greene	12,006	64.99%	6,359	34.42%	43	0.23%	66	0.36%	5,647	30.57%	18,474
Huntingdon	7,429	42.72%	9,815	56.43%	46	0.26%	102	0.59%	-2,386	-13.72%	17,392
Indiana	15,353	47.71%	16,530	51.37%	75	0.23%	219	0.68%	-1,177	-3.66%	32,177
Jefferson	11,080	47.54%	11,943	51.24%	102	0.44%	181	0.78%	-863	-3.70%	23,306
Juniata	3,782	51.06%	3,576	48.28%	7	0.09%	42	0.57%	206	2.78%	7,407
Lackawanna	80,585	60.23%	51,186	38.26%	1,358	1.01%	672	0.50%	29,399	21.97%	133,801
Lancaster	38,454	46.74%	42,272	51.38%	1,054	1.28%	493	0.60%	-3,818	-4.64%	82,273
Lawrence	21,994	57.74%	15,458	40.58%	310	0.81%	328	0.86%	6,536	17.16%	38,090
Lebanon	13,800	50.23%	13,213	48.09%	160	0.58%	303	1.10%	587	2.14%	27,476
Lehigh	35,325	56.41%	25,841	41.27%	931	1.49%	524	0.84%	9,484	15.15%	62,621
Luzerne	104,809	55.61%	81,672	43.33%	1,136	0.60%	862	0.46%	23,137	12.28%	188,479
Lycoming	19,376	50.62%	18,315	47.84%	246	0.64%	343	0.90%	1,061	2.77%	38,280
McKean	9,733	43.88%	11,837	53.37%	445	2.01%	166	0.75%	-2,104	-9.49%	22,181
Mercer	20,879	51.79%	18,493	45.88%	552	1.37%	387	0.96%	2,386	5.92%	40,311
Mifflin	9,581	57.98%	6,867	41.56%	26	0.16%	51	0.31%	2,714	16.42%	16,525
Monroe	8,212	58.33%	5,778	41.04%	47	0.33%	42	0.30%	2,434	17.29%	14,079
Montgomery	57,870	45.74%	66,442	52.52%	1,565	1.24%	629	0.50%	-8,572	-6.78%	126,506
Montour	3,534	59.76%	2,350	39.74%	20	0.34%	10	0.17%	1,184	20.02%	5,914
Northampton	36,871	60.31%	22,827	37.34%	1,020	1.67%	418	0.68%	14,044	22.97%	61,136
Northumberland	31,849	58.63%	21,758	40.06%	459	0.85%	252	0.46%	10,091	18.58%	54,318
Perry	5,780	49.83%	5,759	49.65%	9	0.08%	52	0.45%	21	0.18%	11,600
Philadelphia	539,757	60.46%	329,881	36.95%	18,266	2.05%	4,846	0.54%	209,876	23.51%	892,750
Pike	2,396	50.54%	2,304	48.60%	17	0.36%	24	0.51%	92	1.94%	4,741
Potter	3,553	39.81%	5,172	57.94%	106	1.19%	95	1.06%	-1,619	-18.14%	8,926
Schuylkill	55,183	54.68%	44,353	43.95%	999	0.99%	386	0.38%	10,830	10.73%	100,921
Snyder	2,999	34.88%	5,550	64.55%	21	0.24%	28	0.33%	-2,551	-29.67%	8,598
Somerset	16,184	47.97%	17,375	51.50%	72	0.21%	110	0.33%	-1,191	-3.53%	33,741
Sullivan	1,740	44.37%	2,121	54.08%	28	0.71%	33	0.84%	-381	-9.71%	3,922
Susquehanna	6,520	39.43%	9,745	58.94%	196	1.19%	73	0.44%	-3,225	-19.51%	16,534
Tioga	5,442	30.05%	12,567	69.40%	34	0.19%	65	0.36%	-7,125	-39.35%	18,108
Union	2,946	34.25%	5,589	64.97%	17	0.20%	50	0.58%	-2,643	-30.73%	8,602
Venango	9,212	33.42%	17,676	64.13%	233	0.85%	442	1.60%	-8,464	-30.71%	27,563
Warren	8,495	45.27%	9,440	50.30%	564	3.01%	268	1.43%	-945	-5.04%	18,767
Washington	52,878	68.52%	23,342	30.25%	603	0.78%	345	0.45%	29,536	38.27%	77,168
Wayne	4,864	33.82%	9,347	65.00%	100	0.70%	69	0.48%	-4,483	-31.18%	14,380
Westmoreland	73,574	65.73%	36,079	32.23%	1,436	1.28%	848	0.76%	37,495	33.50%	111,937
Wyoming	3,269	37.63%	5,321	61.25%	36	0.41%	61	0.70%	-2,052	-23.62%	8,687
York	45,142	59.53%	29,233	38.55%	915	1.21%	547	0.72%	15,909	20.98%	75,837
Totals	2,353,788	56.88%	1,690,300	40.85%	67,478	1.63%	26,539	0.64%	663,488	16.03%	4,138,105

==== Counties that flipped from Republican to Democratic ====
- Armstrong
- Blair
- Bucks
- Carbon
- Centre
- Clinton
- Cumberland
- Dauphin
- Franklin
- Lawrence
- Lebanon
- Lycoming
- Mercer
- Mifflin
- Perry
- Philadelphia

==== Counties that flipped from Democratic to Republican ====
- Clarion
- Sullivan

== See also ==
- United States presidential elections in Pennsylvania
