= Jordan Brown case =

US prosecution of a child for a 2009 death

Jordan Brown
- Born: August 12, 1997 (age 29); New Beaver, Pennsylvania, U.S.
- Parent: Chris Brown (father)
- Status: Conviction overturned on July 18, 2018
- Convictions: Delinquent of first-degree murder and criminal homicide (acquitted)
- Penalty: Held in juvenile rehabilitation until the age of 21

The Jordan Brown case involves Jordan Brown (born August 12, 1997), who was initially charged at 11 as an adult in the fatal shooting of his father's fiancée, Kenzie Marie Houk, 26, in New Beaver, Pennsylvania, which occurred on the morning of February 20, 2009. Jordan was interviewed by Pennsylvania State Police twice that day and arrested before sunrise the next morning. The Lawrence County District Attorney's Office initially filed the charges in adult court because that is required in Pennsylvania homicide cases, regardless of a defendant's age. The Pennsylvania Attorney General's Office then took over prosecution of the case. After Brown had spent more than three years in a juvenile detention facility in Erie, Pennsylvania, while Pennsylvania courts deliberated his status, Brown was tried as a juvenile and found guilty of being delinquent by a judge on April 13, 2012.

On May 8, 2013, the Superior Court vacated the finding of delinquency, citing "palpable abuse of discretion" and sent the case back to juvenile court. On July 18, 2018, the Pennsylvania Supreme Court overturned his conviction in a 5–0 decision. The justices attacked the evidence as insufficient and said that the juvenile trial evidence pointing to a shotgun in Brown's bedroom as the murder weapon supported an equally reasonable conclusion that it was not the murder weapon.

Brown could have faced a life sentence without parole if he had been tried and convicted for murder as an adult, but he faced custody in a secure juvenile detention center until he reached the age of 21 because he was only 11 when the crime occurred. He was granted transfer of his case into the juvenile court system. Under Pennsylvania Law, those who are under 15 and being tried as an adult are sentenced to life with parole after 25 years.

== Incident ==
Kenzie Houk was eight months pregnant when she was shot in the back of the head while she was sleeping in bed in their western Pennsylvania farmhouse. Both she and her unborn son died as a result of the attack. Houk's 4-year-old daughter alerted nearby tree cutters roughly 45 minutes after Jordan Brown and Houk's 7-year-old daughter got on a school bus. The state Attorney General prosecutor asserted that Houk was killed by a youth-model Harrington & Richardson 20-gauge shotgun, a Christmas gift to Jordan from his father. Pennsylvania State Police found a spent shotgun shell near the path Brown walked with Houk's older daughter to get to their school bus. He was subsequently arrested.

== Controversy ==
The human-rights organization Amnesty International opposed the effort to try Jordan as an adult, citing the mandatory life in prison without the possibility of parole penalty as a violation of international law. A petition signed by nearly 4,000 people protested what it termed as denial of Brown's fifth and sixth amendment rights.

On weekends Jordan hunted alongside his father, Chris Brown, who purchased the youth-sized 20-gauge shotgun that state police believed was the murder weapon. The youth's father did not publicly discuss the case, until after the Pennsylvania Supreme Court exonerated his son nine years later in July 2018.

== Legal proceedings ==
Jordan Brown was initially charged as an adult. Presiding Judge Dominick Motto of the Lawrence County, Pennsylvania, Common Pleas Court initially denied decertification and transfer to juvenile court because Jordan would not admit his involvement in the crime. After Pennsylvania's Superior Court ruled that Judge Motto violated Brown's Fifth Amendment rights, Judge Motto recused himself from the case, and Judge John W. Hodge granted the decertification petition and ruled that Brown should be tried as a juvenile.

The decertification ruling transferred Brown's case from adult court to Lawrence County's family court division regularly presided over by Judge Hodge, who handled the subsequent juvenile adjudication and dispositional hearings.

Then the issue became whether Brown's eventual adjudication hearing (juvenile court trial) should be opened to the public, and whether he should provisionally be released while a decision in that matter was pending. Judge Hodge held that Brown's juvenile hearing would not be open to the public or to the news media. The Pennsylvania Superior Court rejected an appeal by three area newspapers (Pittsburgh Post-Gazette, Pittsburgh Tribune-Review, and New Castle News) to overturn Hodge's ruling and open the hearing to the public. After those newspapers decided not to pursue their appeal further, Judge Hodge was directed by another panel of the Superior Court to move swiftly to hold an adjudication hearing. Judge Hodge ruled that Jordan would not be released pending that hearing.

Following three days of testimony and legal argument, Judge Hodge issued his ruling on April 13, 2012, that Brown was responsible for first degree murder in the death of 26-year-old Kenzie Houk and of homicide in the death of her unborn male child. Judge Hodge adjudicated the now-14-year-old Jordan Brown to be delinquent (the juvenile court equivalent of a guilty verdict). Judge Hodge would announce Brown's disposition (the equivalent of a juvenile sentence) at a later date. Under Pennsylvania law, an adjudicated juvenile offender cannot be held in custody past his 21st birthday. Brown could be held in a juvenile rehabilitative treatment facility only until he turned 21 in August 2018.

After his February 21, 2009 arrest, Jordan was placed in the Lawrence County Jail, a facility for adults. But authorities transferred him to a juvenile center in March 2009 after his attorneys argued that the adult jail with its three cell blocks couldn't accommodate an 11-year-old boy.

On June 13, 2016, more than seven years after his arrest, Jordan Brown was released from juvenile custody, two months before his 19th birthday. Judge Hodge put Brown on probation in the custody of an uncle who lived in Ohio, just across the border from Lawrence County. He was to remain on juvenile court probation until he turned 21. His lawyers continued to file appeals in order to have his juvenile conviction (adjudication) overturned. Two years later that resulted in the July 18, 2018 Pennsylvania Supreme Court ruling.

== Possible retrial ==
On May 8, 2013, Superior Court, in the second appeal that came before it in this case, ruled that "the juvenile court committed a palpable abuse of discretion in rendering a ruling that is plainly contrary to the evidence" and vacated the juvenile court's disposition of delinquency. The ruling in particular objected to the assumption, made by the juvenile court, that no one else but Jordan could have shot Houk.

Judge Hodge issued a juvenile court opinion on April 19, 2015, again finding that Jordan was the individual who killed Kenzie Houk and her unborn child on the morning of February 20, 2009. His disposition order was dated May 18, 2012. And again a third appeal was taken to the Pennsylvania Superior Court. In a split panel decision dated September 1, 2016, titled In re J.B. III, 147 A.3d 1204 (Pa.Super. 2016) (“In re J.B. III”), the Superior Court affirmed the juvenile court, and rejected claims that the juvenile court had improperly reassessed the evidence and made new credibility determinations in ruling on Brown's post-dispositional motions.

A certiorari request for review was made to the Pennsylvania Supreme Court, which granted an appeal to consider Brown's claims that the evidence was insufficient as a matter of law to sustain the adjudication of the juvenile court, and that its adjudication was against the weight of the evidence.

== Conviction overturned ==
On July 18, 2018, the Pennsylvania Supreme Court overturned his conviction in a 5–0 decision. The two Pennsylvania Supreme Court justices who did not participate had previously ruled in Jordan's favor on his earlier appeal while they had served as judges in the Pennsylvania Superior Court. The justices attacked the evidence as insufficient and said that the juvenile trial evidence pointing to a shotgun in Brown's bedroom as the murder weapon supported an equally reasonable conclusion that it was not the murder weapon. Justice Debra Todd wrote the Court's opinion and noted, "The Commonwealth’s evidence was, therefore, insufficient as a matter of law to overcome Appellant’s presumption of innocence, and the juvenile court’s adjudication of his delinquency for these serious crimes must be reversed." The last words of the opinion then ordered that "Appellant is discharged." Double jeopardy has attached under the Fifth Amendment, and Brown, now 21, cannot be retried.

Another possible suspect is Adam Harvey, an ex-boyfriend of Houk. Houk had a restraining order against Harvey because Houk had claimed Harvey threatened to kill her and her family.

== Current life ==
As of 2018, Brown was a college junior studying computer science. He has repeatedly stated in interviews that while he has PTSD, he is committed to turning his life around.
