= Sisters of the Holy Humility of Mary =

Sisters of the Humility of Mary
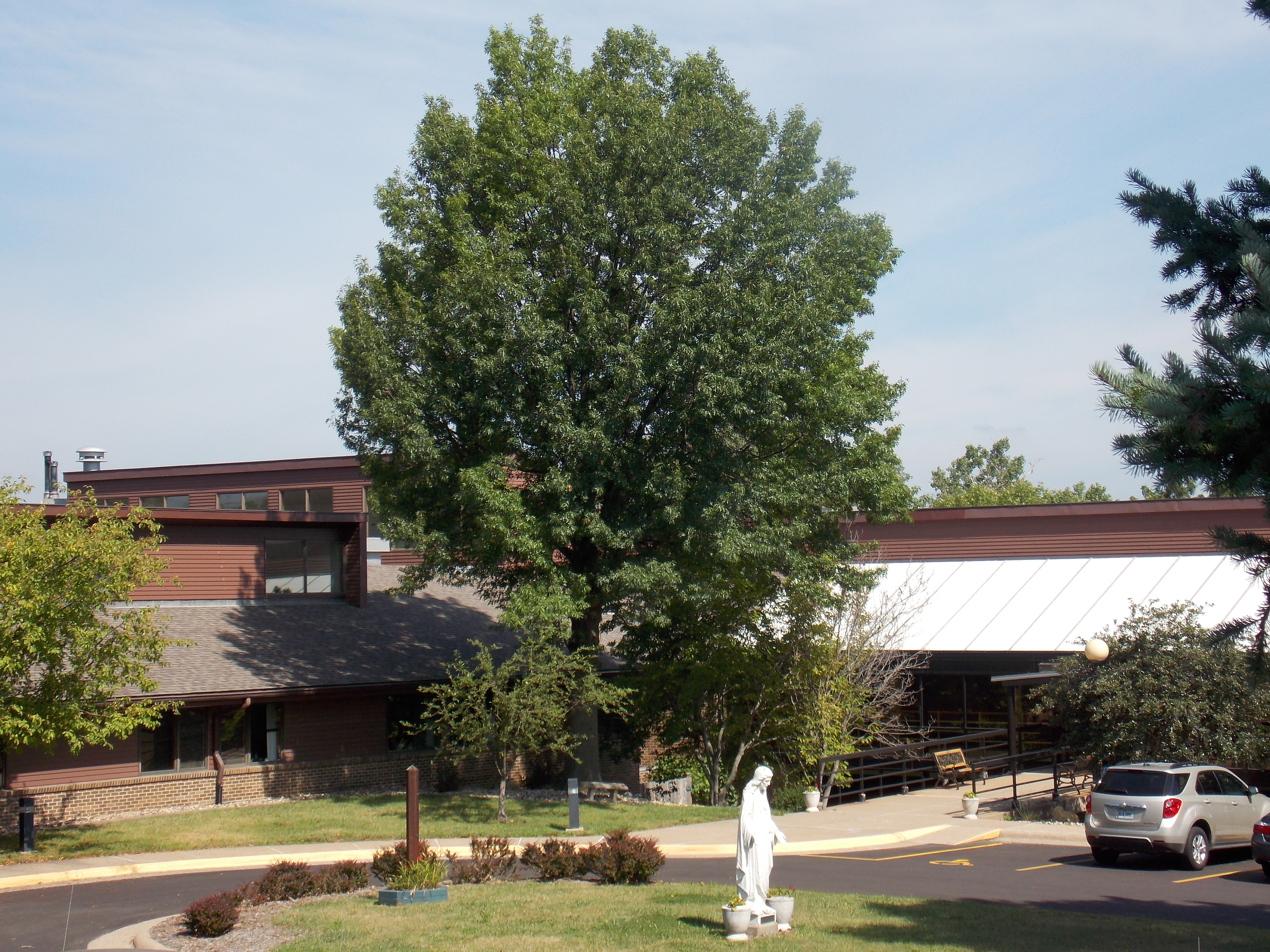
- Humility of Mary Center in Davenport, Iowa
- Abbreviation: H.M./C.H.M.
- Formation: c. AD 1854; 172 years ago
- Founder: John Joseph Begel; Mary Magdelen Poitier
- Type: Catholic religious order
- Headquarters: United States of America
- Website: humilityofmary.org

The Sisters of the Humility of Mary is a Roman Catholic religious congregation, founded at Dommartin-sous-Amance, France, in 1855. The community immigrated to the United States in 1864, and established themselves near New Bedford, Pennsylvania. This community is known as the Sisters of the Humility of Mary and is based at Villa Maria, Pennsylvania.

A separate congregation developed from the Sisters of the Humility of Mary when around 1884, five sisters founded a convent in Ottumwa, Iowa. That community is known as the Congregation of the Humility of Mary and is based in Davenport Iowa.

== History ==
The founder was John Joseph Begel (b. 5 April 1817; d. 23 Jan., 1884), pastor of the two villages of Laitre and Dommartin. In 1854, three pious women offered their services for the work of teaching poor children: Marie-Antoinette Poitier, Marie Tabourat, and Mary Joseph. Begel conceived the idea of establishing a religious community, and the following year he drew up a rule which was adopted by the women and approved by the Bishop of Nancy on 29 August 1858. Poitier, who founded the society alongside Begel, took the religious name of Mary Magdelen; Tabourat took the name Mary Anna.

The object of the new congregation was the education of youth in country districts and small towns, the training of orphans, the care of the sick, and incidentally the decoration of altars in parish churches. The association increased in numbers. Soon, however, Begel's open condemnation of the policy of Napoleon III towards the Catholic church and especially towards religious institutes, brought him into disfavour with the civil authorities, and the sisters of the community were refused diplomas and prevented from opening schools.

=== Sisters of the Humility of Mary (HM), Pennsylvania ===
In 1862, Louis Hoffer, a priest of Louisville, Ohio, U.S.A., applied for four sisters to teach in his school. Bishop Louis Rappe of Cleveland not only gave his approval, but invited the whole community to settle in his diocese. The sisters, accompanied by Begel, set sail 30 May 1864, and on their arrival took possession of a farm of 250 acres (1.0 km^{2}) near New Bedford, Pennsylvania,(which had been transferred to the Cleveland diocese from the Diocese of Pittsburgh). The brought with them a statue of Mary from the convent garden at Dommartin-sous-Amance.

The farm had recently been vacated by the Sisters of Charity of St. Augustine, and to which they gave the name Villa Maria. It was far from a railroad, and the land was uncultivated, undrained, overgrown with brush, and dotted with sloughs, the buildings being surrounded by a marsh. Moreover, the community was destitute of resources and burdened with debt. The sisters in Ohio wore a blue woolen habit, a black veil being worn by the professed, and a white one by novices. A silver medal was suspended from the neck on a blue band, and a rosary from the girdle, which was also of blue.

The "blue nuns" went to farmhouses to protect children from contagious disease and cared for injured railroad workers in a small clinic at their motherhouse. They undertook the care of orphans and the work to which they had pledged themselves, and were soon able to enlarge the buildings (1869 and 1878), and shortly afterwards a chapel was built. The year 1884 was marked by the death of Father Begel, the venerable founder. In 1899 ground was purchased at Cleveland, Ohio, for an academy, which was chartered a few years later, in 1892, under the title of Lourdes Academy, named for Our Lady of Lourdes, and empowered to confer degrees. In 1897 it was removed to a more suitable location. In 1897, the Holy Humility of Mary Sisters (the “Blue Nuns”) took charge of St. John's parish school in Ashtabula. From 1900 to 1922 they taught at Most Pure Heart of Mary parish in Shelby.

Since Villa Maria was far from railroad facilities, a tract of sixty-three acres between Canton and Massillon, Ohio, was purchased in 1904 for the purpose of erecting a new mother-house, to be known as Mount Maria, and a college, which was opened in 1908 under the title of College of the Immaculate Conception.

In 1955, they opened Magnificat High School in Rocky River, Ohio. In 1987 the sisters started Humility of Mary Housing, Inc. (HMHI). Ten sites covering a five counties provide housing for low income seniors and single parents in transition. can find hope, independence, and self-worth. In 2009, in conjunction with the Ursuline Sisters of Youngstown, the Sisters of the Humility of Mary sponsor Dorothy Day House, a hospitality house offering meals, showers, and respite for the poor and unemployed. Opened in 2010, Opportunity House in Garfield Heights, houses young men with diagnosed disabilities who have aged out of foster care.

In 1991, the "Heartsbeats" program was begun, selling items made by women in the United States and developing world countries to provide a market to help them support themselves through their skills.

Today, the Sisters of the Humility of Mary work in education, healthcare and social service primarily in the diocese of Cleveland, Youngstown and Pittsburgh. Through the Catholic Migrant Farmworkers Network they raise awareness about human trafficking. There is also a member working in Haiti. The community is based at the Villa Maria Education & Spirituality Center in Villa Maria, Pennsylvania. As of 2014, there were 154 vowed members and 63 associates.

==== Healthcare ====
The sisters entered health care in 1879 when St. Joseph's Infirmary was built, the first Catholic hospital in the Mahoning Valley, which functioned until 1910 when the sisters given charge of St. Elizabeth Hospital in Youngstown, Ohio. In 1922, undertook the staffing of the Rose-Mary Home, a home for crippled children. Two more Ohio hospitals came under the direction of the sisters - St. Joseph Health Center in Warren in 1924 and St. Joseph in Lorain in 1927. By 2011, Humility of Mary Health Partners was formed to oversee the administration and management of St. Elizabeth Hospital and St. Joseph Health Center and several other area health-care services. By 2014, the hospitals were run by Catholic Health Partners.

=== Congregation of the Humility of Mary (CHM), Iowa ===
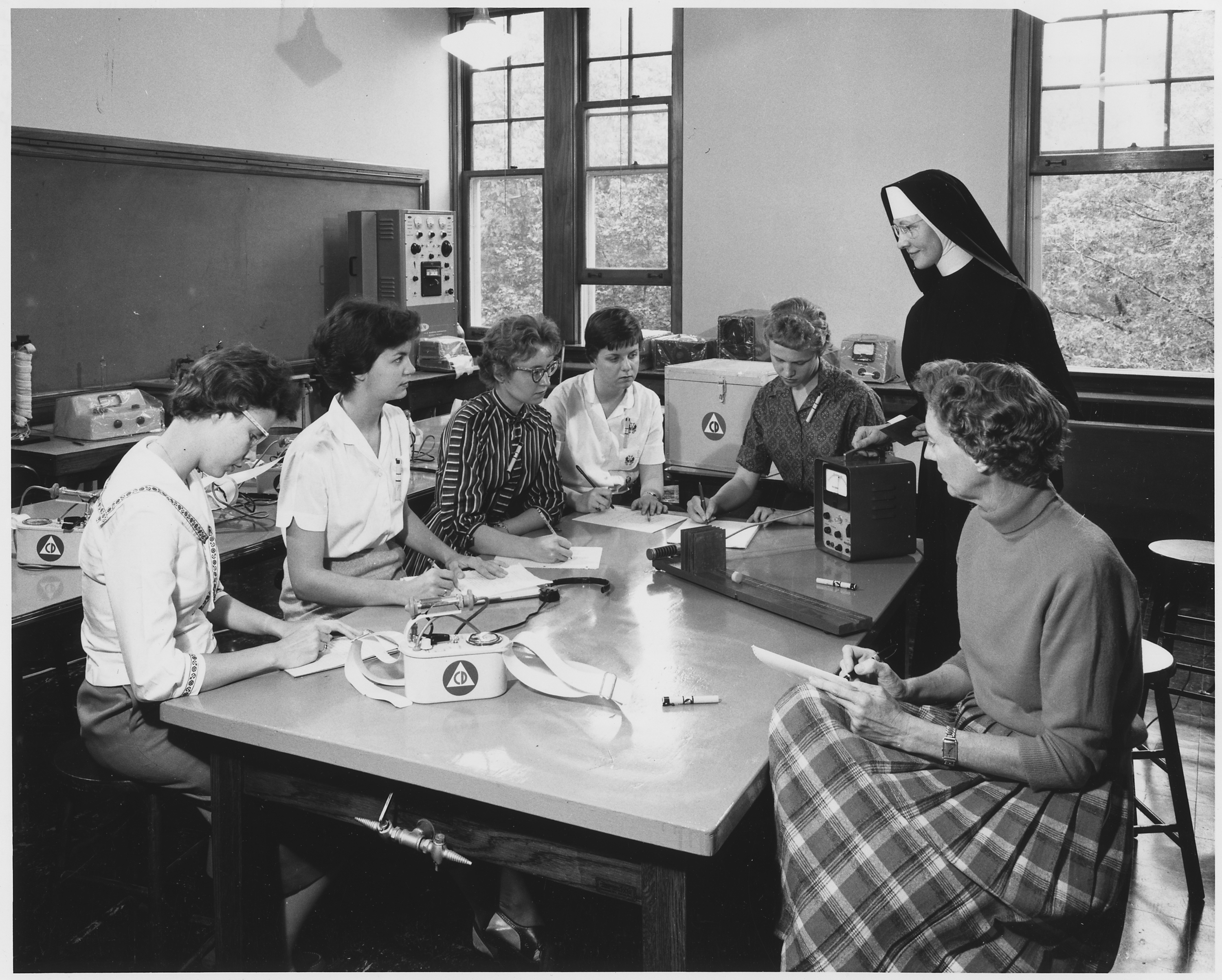
Mary Helene ven Horst and students at Marycrest College

Twenty years after they established themselves in Pennsylvania, five sisters settled in southeastern Iowa where they eventually established a motherhouse in Ottumwa. The Iowa sisters wore a black habit, that featured a shoulder cape, and veil. They wore a crucifix suspended on a cord around their neck and a rosary suspended from their belt.

The sisters founded St. Joseph Junior College, later renamed Ottumwa Heights College, in 1925. It was a normal school that trained young women to teach in Iowa's rural schools. They created the first religious "vacation schools" that educated children in rural Montana in their Catholic faith. They brought the same program back to Iowa, and then extended it to other parts of the Midwest. In 1939 they opened Marycrest College, a four-year Liberal arts college, in Davenport, Iowa.

The sisters are active in a variety of ministries. The congregation is a participating supporter of the Sister Water Project, a program of the Sisters of St. Francis of Dubuque, Iowa which has completed/restored over 140 well projects in Tanzania and 20 water systems in Honduras, providing a clean and safe source of water for residents. They run Our Lady of the Prairie Retreat near Wheatland, Iowa in Clinton County.

==== Housing ====
The congregation sponsors Humility Homes and Services, Inc., founded in 1990 as Humility of Mary Housing, Inc, to provide services and assistance with housing to the homelessness. In 2008, they opened the Humility of Mary Shelter, Inc. emergency shelter. In 2018 the two programs merged administrative and service operations to form Humility Homes and Services, Inc.

In 1983 the congregation's headquarters in Iowa was transferred to Davenport. CHMs and their associates are active in 20 states as well as Mexico and Canada.

== See also ==
- Catholic Health Partners
