= Zambelli =

Zambelli is an Italian surname. Notable people with the surname include:

- Andrea Zambelli (1927–1994), Italian bobsledder
- Carla Zambelli (born 1980), Brazilian politician
- Carlotta Zambelli (1875–1968), Italian ballerina
- Corrado Zambelli (1897–1974), Italian classical bass
- Eugenio Zambelli (born 1948), Italian singer
- George Zambelli (1924–2003), American fireworks entertainer
- Henri Zambelli (born 1957), French footballer
- Stefania Zambelli (born 1971), Italian politician
- Marco Zambelli (born 1985), Italian footballer

== See also ==
- Zambellas
