= Frizzleburg, Pennsylvania =

Unincorporated community in Pennsylvania, US

- Census-designated place
- Location within Pennsylvania Location within the United States
- Coordinates: 41°4′40″N 80°27′17″W
- Country: United States
- State: Pennsylvania
- County: Lawrence
- Township: Pulaski

Area
  - Total: 2.83 sq mi (7.34 km^{2})
  - Land: 2.82 sq mi (7.31 km^{2})
  - Water: 0.012 sq mi (0.03 km^{2})
- Elevation: 1,078 ft (329 m)

Population (2020)
  - Total: 442
  - Density: 156.5/sq mi (60.43/km^{2})
- Time zone: UTC-4 (EST)
  - Summer (DST): UTC-5 (EDT)
- Area code: 724
- FIPS code: 42-28014
- GNIS feature ID: 1175282

Frizzleburg is an unincorporated community and census-designated place (CDP) in Lawrence County, Pennsylvania, United States. The population was 602 at the 2010 census.

== Geography ==
Frizzleburg is located in northwestern Lawrence County at 41°4′40″N 80°27′17″W (41.0778, -80.4547), in the south-central part of Pulaski Township. It is bordered on the south by Mahoning Township.

U.S. Route 422 (Ben Franklin Parkway) forms the southwestern side of the CDP; it leads southeastward 8 miles (13 km) to New Castle, the Lawrence county seat, and west-northwest 10 miles (16 km) to the center of Youngstown, Ohio. Pennsylvania Route 551 forms the eastern edge of the CDP, leading north 3 miles (5 km) to the village of Pulaski and Interstate 376, and south 4 miles (6 km) to Edinburg and U.S. Route 224.

According to the United States Census Bureau, the Frizzleburg CDP has a total area of 2.8 square miles (7.3 km^{2}), of which 0.01 square miles (0.03 km^{2}), or 0.42%, are water. Most of the community drains north, east, or southeast to the Shenango River, while a small portion on the southwestern side drains to Coffee Run and Marshall Run, tributaries of the Mahoning River. The Shenango and Mahoning rivers join south of New Castle to form the Beaver River, a southward-flowing tributary of the Ohio River.

== Demographics ==
Historical population
Census	Pop.	Note	%±
2020	442		—
U.S. Decennial Census
