= Zambellas =

Zambellas (Greek: Ζαμπέλλας) is a Greek surname. Notable people with the surname include:

- George Zambellas (born 1958), British admiral
- Michalakis Zambellas (1937–2019), Cypriot businessman, politician, and philanthropist

== See also ==
- Zambelli
