= Villa Maria, Pennsylvania =

Unincorporated community in Pennsylvania, US

- Unincorporated community
- Location within Pennsylvania Location within the United States
- Coordinates: 41°04′25″N 80°30′26″W
- Country: United States
- State: Pennsylvania
- County: Lawrence
- Township: Pulaski
- Elevation: 1,086 ft (331 m)
- Time zone: UTC-5 (Eastern (EST))
  - Summer (DST): UTC-4 (EDT)
- ZIP code: 16155
- Area codes: 724, 878
- GNIS feature ID: 1190414

Villa Maria is an unincorporated community in Lawrence County, Pennsylvania, United States. The community, which is located near the Ohio border, is a religious community and farm complex for the Sisters of the Holy Humility of Mary. Villa Maria has a post office with ZIP code 16155, which opened on January 21, 1889.
