= New Castle Municipal Airport =

Airport in Pennsylvania, US

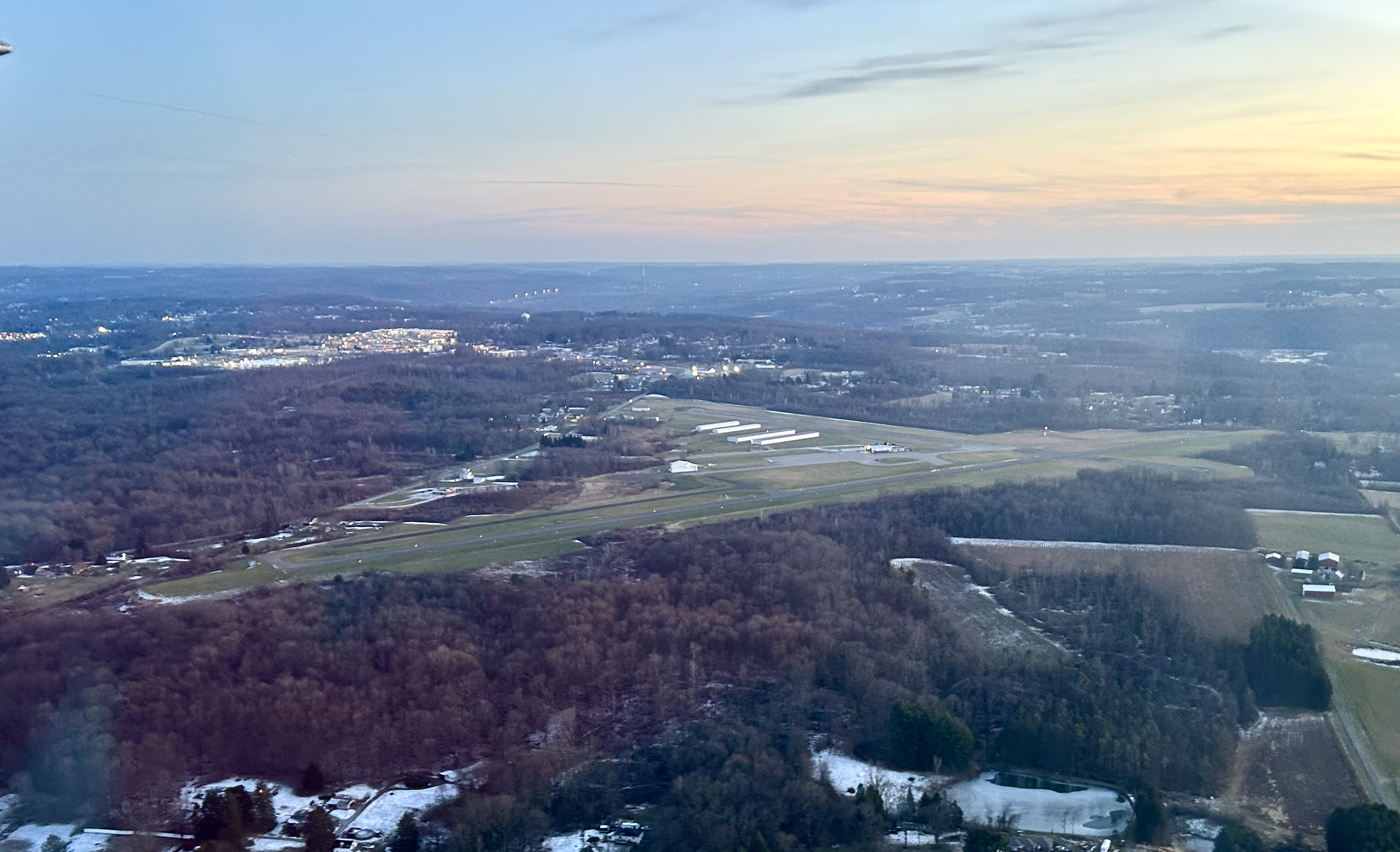
- IATA: none; ICAO: KUCP; FAA LID: UCP

Summary
- Airport type: Public
- Owner: Lawrence County Airport Authority
- Serves: New Castle, Pennsylvania
- Location: Union Township
- Elevation AMSL: 1,070 ft / 326 m
- Coordinates: 41°01′31″N 080°24′48″W

Map
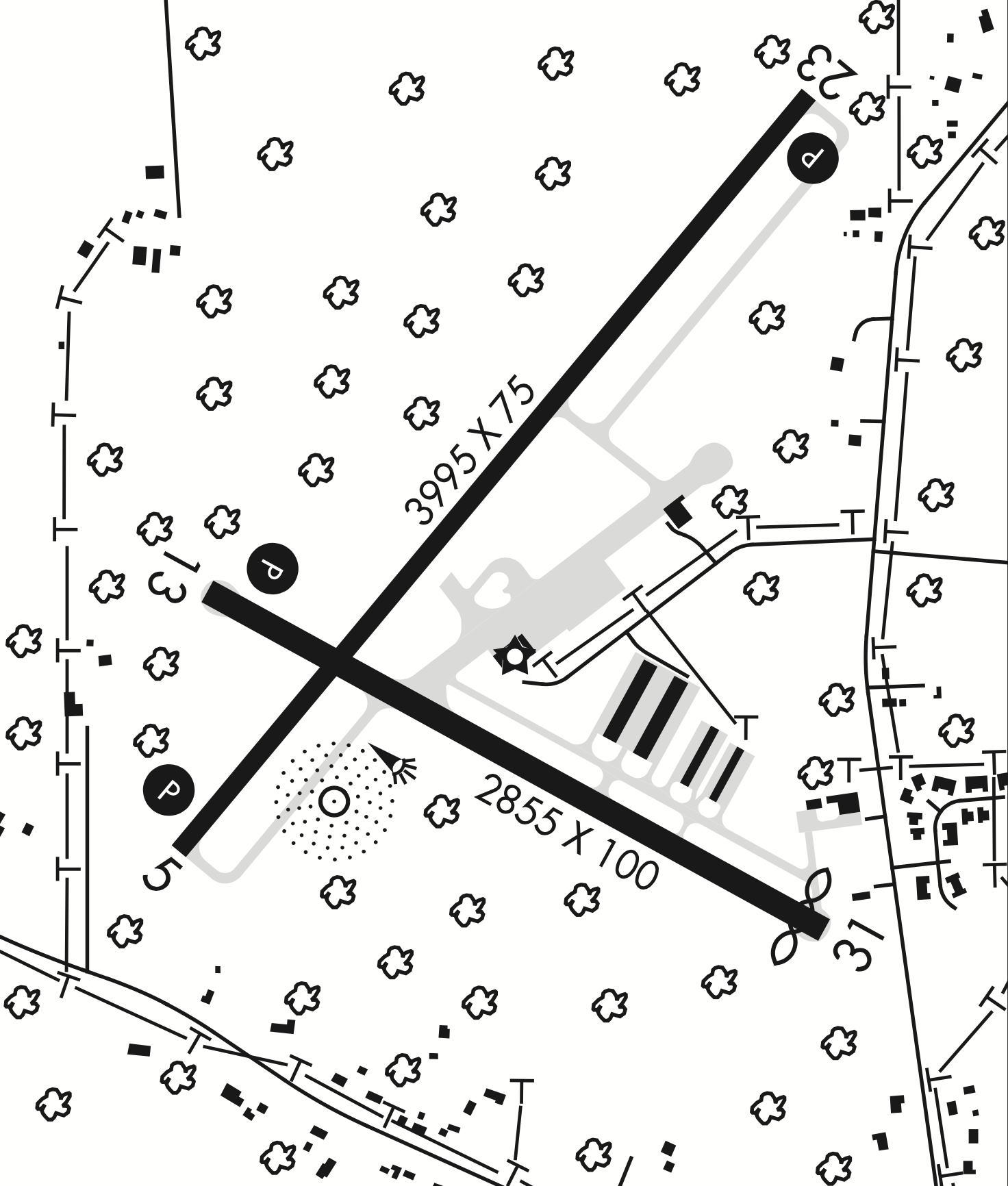
- Airport diagram

Runways
Direction	Length		Surface
Direction	ft	m	Surface
5/23	3,995	1,218	Asphalt
13/31	2,475	837	Asphalt

Statistics (2009)
- Aircraft operations: 35,357
- Based aircraft: 58
- Source: Federal Aviation Administration

New Castle Municipal Airport (ICAO: KUCP, FAA LID: UCP) is a small municipal airport located in Union Township, Lawrence County, Pennsylvania serving Lawrence County, Pennsylvania, part of the Pittsburgh metropolitan area. Union Township is an outskirt of New Castle, Pennsylvania hence the name. The airport is located four nautical miles (7 km) northwest of the central business district of New Castle. The airport is a public-owned airport and is controlled by the Lawrence County Airport Authority.

This airport is assigned a three-letter location identifier of UCP by the Federal Aviation Administration, but it does not have an International Air Transport Association (IATA) airport code.

== Facilities and aircraft ==
New Castle Municipal Airport covers an area of 320 acres (130 ha) at an elevation of 1,070 feet (326 m) above mean sea level. It has two asphalt paved runways: 5/23 is 3,995 by 75 feet (1,218 x 23 m) and 13/31 is 2,745 by 100 feet (837 x 30 m).

The airport's fixed-base operator (FBO) is Haski Aviation.

For the 12-month period ending February 28, 2009, the airport had 35,357 aircraft operations, an average of 96 per day: 97% general aviation, 3% air taxi and <1% military. At that time there were 58 aircraft based at this airport: 96% single-engine, 2% multi-engine and 2% helicopter.

== See also ==
- List of airports in Pennsylvania
