= Pulaski Township, Lawrence County, Pennsylvania =

Township in Pennsylvania, US

Coordinates: 41°5′N 80°30′W

Pulaski Township
- Township
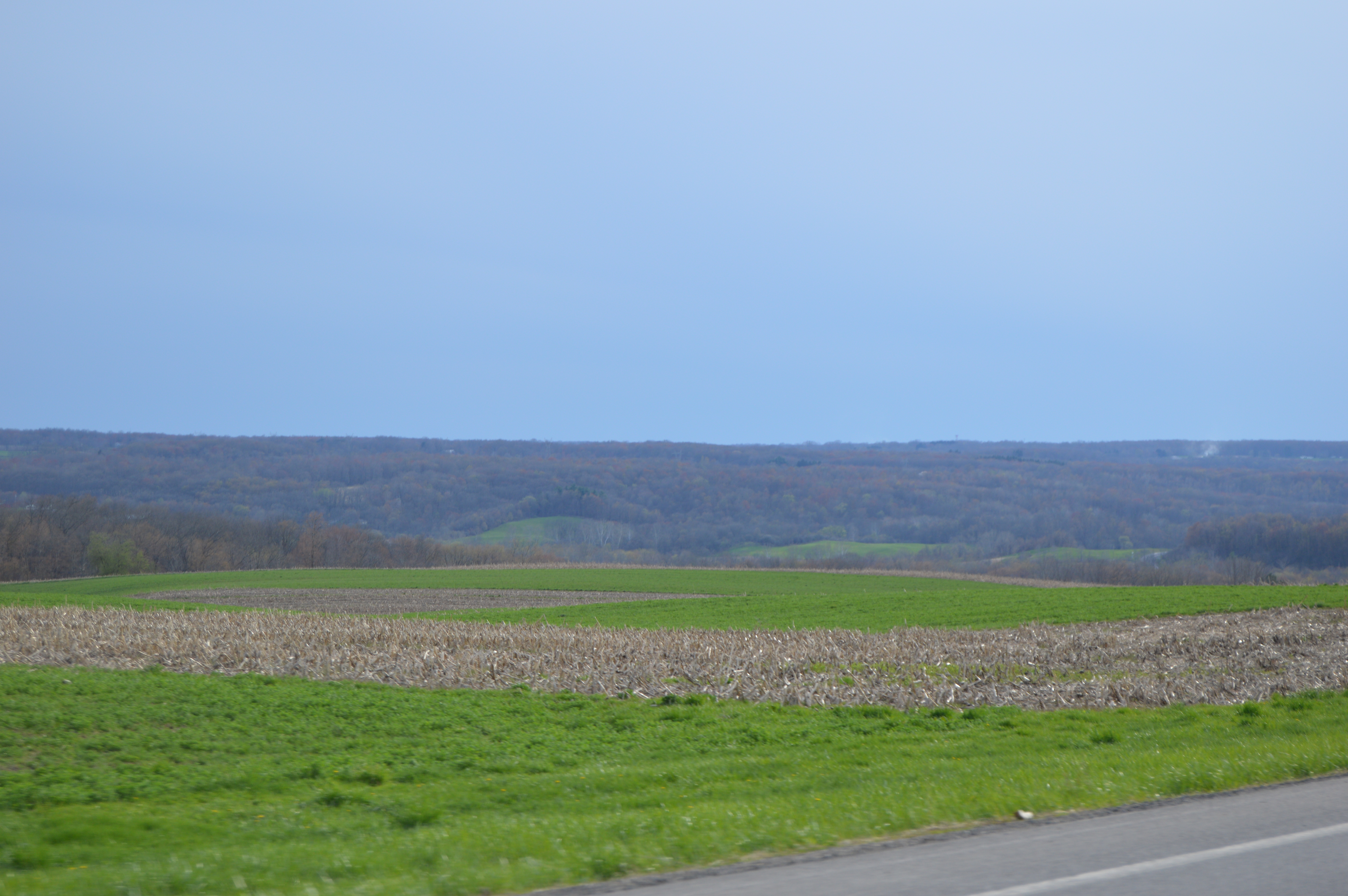
- Hills in the township's east

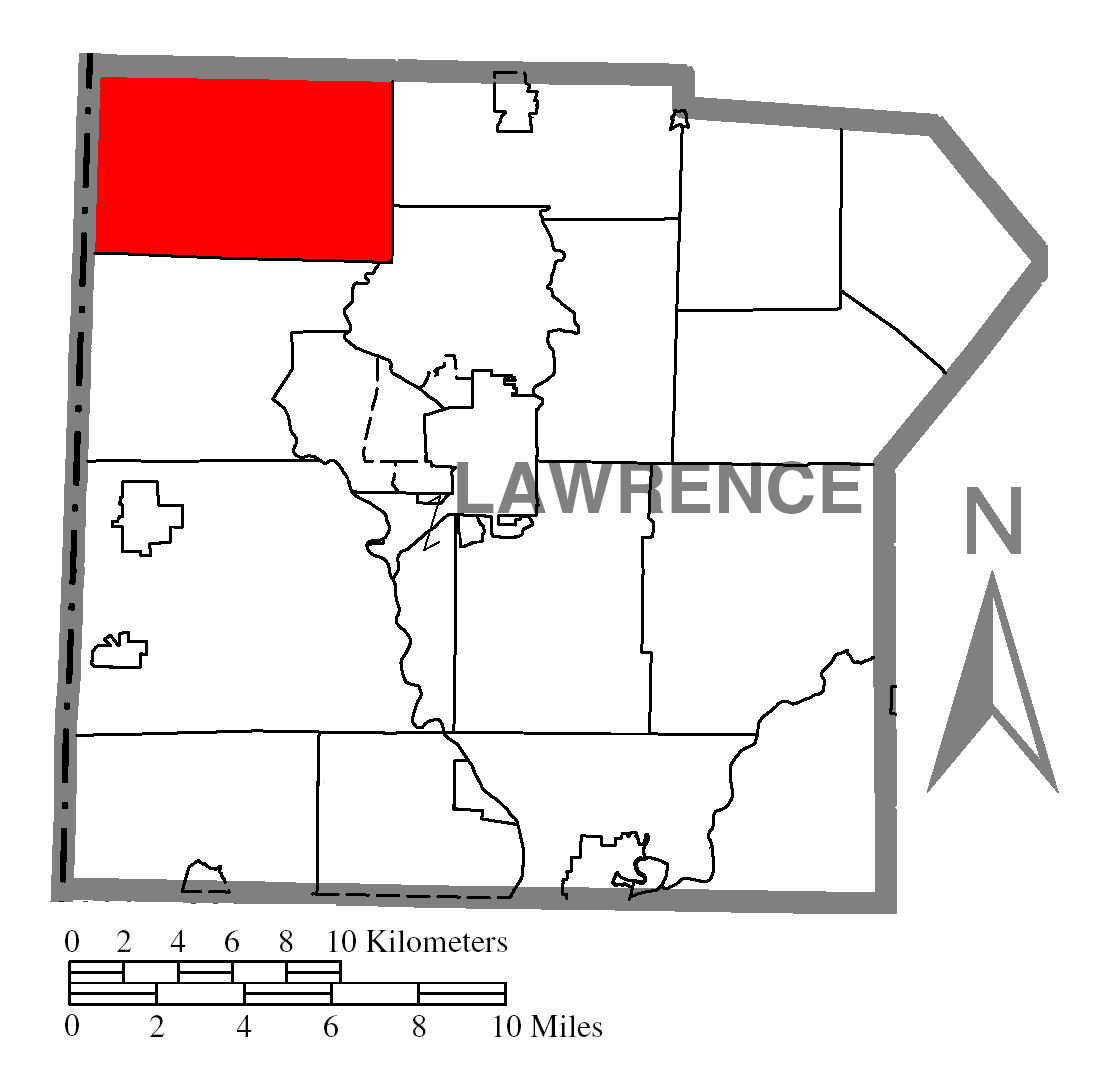
- Location of Pulaski Township in Lawrence County

- Location of Lawrence County in Pennsylvania
- Country: United States
- State: Pennsylvania
- County: Lawrence
- Established: 1846

Area
  - Total: 30.92 sq mi (80.09 km^{2})
  - Land: 30.68 sq mi (79.45 km^{2})
  - Water: 0.25 sq mi (0.64 km^{2})
- Highest elevation (eastern border of township): 1,220 ft (370 m)
- Lowest elevation (Shenango River): 798 ft (243 m)

Population (2020)
  - Total: 3,096
  - Estimate (2022): 3,048
  - Density: 108.0/sq mi (41.68/km^{2})
- Time zone: UTC-4 (EST)
  - Summer (DST): UTC-5 (EDT)
- Postal code: 16143
- Area code: 724
- FIPS code: 42-073-62904
- Website: https://pulaskitwplcpa.com/

Historical population
Census	Pop.	Note	%±
2000	3,658		—
2010	3,452		−5.6%
2020	3,096		−10.3%
2022 (est.)	3,048		−1.6%
U.S. Decennial Census

Pulaski Township is a township in Lawrence County, Pennsylvania, United States. The population was 3,096 at the 2020 census, a decline from the figure of 3,452 tabulated in 2010. The township was originally incorporated in 1846 as part of Mercer County, and in 1849, joined the newly created Lawrence County.

== Geography ==
According to the United States Census Bureau, the township has a total area of 30.5 square miles (79.1 km^{2}), of which 30.5 square miles (78.9 km^{2}) is land and 0.1 square miles (0.2 km^{2}), or 0.20%, is water.

The western border of the township is the Ohio state line.

The township includes the unincorporated communities of New Bedford, Frizzleburg, Pulaski, Villa Maria, and Nashua.

== Demographics ==
As of the 2000 census, there were 3,658 people, 1,292 households, and 1,006 families residing in the township. The population density was 120.0 inhabitants per square mile (46.3/km^{2}). There were 1,358 housing units at an average density of 44.6 per square mile (17.2/km^{2}). The racial makeup of the township was 98.96% White, 0.27% African American, 0.08% Native American, 0.14% Asian, 0.22% from other races, and 0.33% from two or more races. Hispanic or Latino of any race were 0.30% of the population.

There were 1,292 households, out of which 33.5% had children under the age of 18 living with them, 64.8% were married couples living together, 9.4% had a female householder with no husband present, and 22.1% were non-families. 19.6% of all households were made up of individuals, and 9.1% had someone living alone who was 65 years of age or older. The average household size was 2.75 and the average family size was 3.15.

In the township the population was spread out, with 25.6% under the age of 18, 7.7% from 18 to 24, 26.6% from 25 to 44, 23.2% from 45 to 64, and 16.9% who were 65 years of age or older. The median age was 39 years. For every 100 females, there were 92.5 males. For every 100 females age 18 and over, there were 90.4 males.

The median income for a household in the township was $34,181, and the median income for a family was $39,698. Males had a median income of $32,013 versus $19,556 for females. The per capita income for the township was $15,397. About 10.8% of families and 15.0% of the population were below the poverty line, including 17.9% of those under the age of 18 and 22.2% of those 65 and older.

== Education ==
The Wilmington Area School District serves the township.

== Transportation ==
=== Major roads and highways ===
- I-376
- US 422
- PA 208
- PA 551

== Notable people ==
- S. H. M. Byers, poet and Union Army soldier who authored "Sherman's March to the Sea," which was memorialized in describing the Union Army's military campaign through Georgia in late 1864
