= 1968 United States presidential election in Pennsylvania =

- November 5, 1968

Nominee	Hubert Humphrey	Richard Nixon	George Wallace
Party	Democratic	Republican	American Independent
Home state	Minnesota	New York (Note: Although he was born in California and he served as a U.S. senator from California, in 1968 Richard Nixon’s official state of residence was New York, because he moved there to practice law after his defeat in the 1962 California gubernatorial election. During his first term as president, Nixon re-established his residency in California. Consequently, most reliable reference books list Nixon’s home state as New York in the 1968 election and his home state as California in the 1972 (and 1960) election.)	Alabama
Running mate	Edmund Muskie	Spiro Agnew	S. Marvin Griffin
Electoral vote	29	0	0
Popular vote	2,259,405	2,090,017	378,582
Percentage	47.59%	44.02%	7.97%

Humphrey
40–50%
50–60%
60–70%
70–80%
80–90%
Nixon
40–50%
50–60%
60–70%
70–80%
80–90%
90–100%
Tie/no data
President before election
Lyndon B. Johnson
Democratic
Elected President
Richard Nixon
Republican

The 1968 United States presidential election in Pennsylvania took place on November 5, 1968, and was part of the 1968 United States presidential election. Voters chose 29 representatives, or electors, to the Electoral College, who voted for president and vice president.

Pennsylvania voted for the Democratic nominee, Vice President Hubert Humphrey, over the Republican nominee, former vice president Richard Nixon. Humphrey won Pennsylvania by a margin of 3.57%. A third-party candidate, former Alabama governor George Wallace, played a significant role by winning 7.97% of the vote. Nixon would become the first Republican to win the White House without carrying Pennsylvania. This feat would be reprised by George W. Bush in 2000 and 2004, although the state voted for the popular vote winner in 2000. This marked the first time since 1948 that a losing presidential candidate carried Pennsylvania, and the first time ever that the candidate was a Democrat.

Among the victorious Democratic slate of electors was the author and former congressional candidate James Michener.

== Results ==
1968 United States presidential election in Pennsylvania
Party	Candidate	Votes	Percentage	Electoral votes
Democratic	Hubert Humphrey	2,259,405	47.59%	29
Republican	Richard Nixon	2,090,017	44.02%	0
American Independent	George Wallace	378,582	7.97%	0
Peace and Freedom	Dick Gregory	7,821	0.16%	0
Socialist Labor	Henning A. Blomen	4,977	0.10%	0
Militant Workers	Fred Halstead	4,862	0.10%	0
Write-ins	Write-ins	2,264	0.05%	0
Totals		4,747,928	100.0%	29
Voter turnout (voting age/registered)				65%/85%

=== Results by county ===
County	Hubert Humphrey Democratic		Richard Nixon Republican		George Wallace American Independent		Various candidates Other parties		Margin		Total votes cast
County	#	%	#	%	#	%	#	%	#	%	Total votes cast
Adams	5,993	31.70%	11,303	59.78%	1,579	8.35%	32	0.17%	-5,310	-28.08%	18,907
Allegheny	364,906	51.12%	264,790	37.09%	79,776	11.18%	4,345	0.61%	100,116	14.03%	713,817
Armstrong	13,921	45.86%	14,132	46.56%	2,256	7.43%	44	0.14%	-211	-0.70%	30,353
Beaver	45,396	55.34%	28,264	34.46%	7,974	9.72%	394	0.48%	17,132	20.88%	82,028
Bedford	4,725	28.61%	10,482	63.46%	1,301	7.88%	10	0.06%	-5,757	-34.85%	16,518
Berks	49,877	45.79%	50,623	46.48%	8,093	7.43%	331	0.30%	-746	-0.69%	108,924
Blair	15,803	32.72%	28,780	59.59%	3,644	7.55%	69	0.14%	-12,977	-26.87%	48,296
Bradford	6,373	30.26%	13,308	63.20%	1,347	6.40%	30	0.14%	-6,935	-32.94%	21,058
Bucks	57,634	40.24%	69,646	48.63%	15,211	10.62%	720	0.50%	-12,012	-8.39%	143,211
Butler	19,415	42.87%	21,618	47.73%	4,139	9.14%	119	0.26%	-2,203	-4.86%	45,291
Cambria	41,225	52.08%	33,280	42.05%	4,485	5.67%	160	0.20%	7,945	10.03%	79,150
Cameron	1,104	35.73%	1,822	58.96%	159	5.15%	5	0.16%	-718	-23.23%	3,090
Carbon	10,634	49.28%	9,954	46.13%	952	4.41%	39	0.18%	680	3.15%	21,579
Centre	11,163	39.13%	15,865	55.61%	1,389	4.87%	110	0.39%	-4,702	-16.48%	28,527
Chester	32,606	33.25%	56,073	57.19%	9,142	9.32%	230	0.23%	-23,467	-23.94%	98,051
Clarion	5,341	37.03%	8,077	56.00%	981	6.80%	24	0.17%	-2,736	-18.97%	14,423
Clearfield	12,369	42.41%	14,471	49.62%	2,252	7.72%	71	0.24%	-2,102	-7.21%	29,163
Clinton	6,301	46.65%	6,563	48.59%	625	4.63%	19	0.14%	-262	-1.94%	13,508
Columbia	8,187	36.83%	12,202	54.89%	1,797	8.08%	43	0.19%	-4,015	-18.06%	22,229
Crawford	11,345	40.19%	14,991	53.11%	1,832	6.49%	58	0.21%	-3,646	-12.92%	28,226
Cumberland	15,467	28.93%	32,908	61.54%	4,893	9.15%	204	0.38%	-17,441	-32.61%	53,472
Dauphin	25,480	31.15%	48,394	59.17%	7,534	9.21%	380	0.46%	-22,914	-28.02%	81,788
Delaware	106,695	40.05%	133,777	50.21%	25,051	9.40%	913	0.34%	-27,082	-10.16%	266,436
Elk	6,886	49.02%	6,193	44.09%	945	6.73%	22	0.16%	693	4.93%	14,046
Erie	51,604	51.68%	43,134	43.20%	4,868	4.88%	241	0.24%	8,470	8.48%	99,847
Fayette	34,340	57.76%	18,921	31.83%	5,984	10.07%	205	0.34%	15,419	25.93%	59,450
Forest	669	33.91%	1,172	59.40%	129	6.54%	3	0.15%	-503	-25.49%	1,973
Franklin	11,451	32.54%	19,146	54.40%	4,557	12.95%	41	0.12%	-7,695	-21.86%	35,195
Fulton	1,174	29.55%	2,200	55.37%	592	14.90%	7	0.18%	-1,026	-25.82%	3,973
Greene	8,198	56.93%	5,099	35.41%	1,094	7.60%	10	0.07%	3,099	21.52%	14,401
Huntingdon	4,128	30.83%	8,276	61.82%	962	7.19%	22	0.16%	-4,148	-30.99%	13,388
Indiana	12,175	41.70%	14,899	51.03%	2,078	7.12%	44	0.15%	-2,724	-9.33%	29,196
Jefferson	6,839	37.28%	10,214	55.67%	1,278	6.97%	16	0.09%	-3,375	-18.39%	18,347
Juniata	2,321	33.76%	4,039	58.76%	507	7.38%	7	0.10%	-1,718	-25.00%	6,874
Lackawanna	66,297	57.96%	44,388	38.80%	3,538	3.09%	168	0.15%	21,909	19.16%	114,391
Lancaster	29,870	27.58%	69,953	64.59%	8,194	7.57%	290	0.27%	-40,083	-37.01%	108,307
Lawrence	21,027	48.78%	18,360	42.60%	3,635	8.43%	81	0.19%	2,667	6.18%	43,103
Lebanon	9,529	28.01%	21,832	64.16%	2,584	7.59%	80	0.24%	-12,303	-36.15%	34,025
Lehigh	44,033	46.15%	47,255	49.53%	3,900	4.09%	220	0.23%	-3,222	-3.38%	95,408
Luzerne	79,040	55.13%	57,044	39.79%	6,857	4.78%	439	0.31%	21,996	15.34%	143,380
Lycoming	16,888	38.76%	23,830	54.70%	2,761	6.34%	87	0.20%	-6,942	-15.94%	43,566
McKean	6,326	35.93%	10,506	59.67%	745	4.23%	30	0.17%	-4,180	-23.74%	17,607
Mercer	22,814	46.46%	23,131	47.11%	3,033	6.18%	127	0.26%	-317	-0.65%	49,105
Mifflin	5,681	38.65%	8,133	55.33%	859	5.84%	25	0.17%	-2,452	-16.68%	14,698
Monroe	6,946	39.14%	9,465	53.33%	1,267	7.14%	69	0.39%	-2,519	-14.19%	17,747
Montgomery	102,464	39.30%	141,621	54.32%	15,599	5.98%	1,048	0.40%	-39,157	-15.02%	260,732
Montour	2,239	37.47%	3,289	55.04%	438	7.33%	10	0.17%	-1,050	-17.57%	5,976
Northampton	42,554	54.47%	32,033	41.00%	3,276	4.19%	267	0.34%	10,521	13.47%	78,130
Northumberland	17,013	40.60%	22,366	53.38%	2,456	5.86%	64	0.15%	-5,353	-12.78%	41,899
Perry	2,944	27.14%	6,655	61.34%	1,222	11.26%	28	0.26%	-3,711	-34.20%	10,849
Philadelphia	525,768	61.85%	254,153	29.90%	63,506	7.47%	6,690	0.79%	271,615	31.95%	850,117
Pike	1,617	27.93%	3,719	64.23%	441	7.62%	13	0.22%	-2,102	-36.30%	5,790
Potter	1,860	29.34%	4,019	63.40%	451	7.11%	9	0.14%	-2,159	-34.06%	6,339
Schuylkill	34,982	45.64%	37,194	48.53%	4,381	5.72%	88	0.11%	-2,212	-2.89%	76,645
Snyder	1,993	21.05%	6,784	71.64%	676	7.14%	16	0.17%	-4,791	-50.59%	9,469
Somerset	11,515	37.24%	17,511	56.63%	1,845	5.97%	50	0.16%	-5,996	-19.39%	30,921
Sullivan	1,035	36.06%	1,629	56.76%	200	6.97%	6	0.21%	-594	-20.70%	2,870
Susquehanna	4,364	31.10%	8,705	62.04%	929	6.62%	34	0.24%	-4,341	-30.94%	14,032
Tioga	3,488	25.16%	9,298	67.07%	1,065	7.68%	12	0.09%	-5,810	-41.91%	13,863
Union	2,178	23.64%	6,422	69.69%	581	6.30%	34	0.37%	-4,244	-46.05%	9,215
Venango	8,319	37.90%	12,323	56.14%	1,262	5.75%	45	0.21%	-4,004	-18.24%	21,949
Warren	6,368	39.88%	8,889	55.67%	676	4.23%	35	0.22%	-2,521	-15.79%	15,968
Washington	47,805	56.26%	28,023	32.98%	9,016	10.61%	124	0.15%	19,782	23.28%	84,968
Wayne	3,176	26.94%	7,827	66.39%	754	6.40%	33	0.28%	-4,651	-39.45%	11,790
Westmoreland	81,833	54.98%	52,206	35.08%	14,436	9.70%	364	0.24%	29,627	19.90%	148,839
Wyoming	2,366	29.12%	5,207	64.09%	539	6.63%	12	0.15%	-2,841	-34.97%	8,124
York	33,328	35.69%	51,631	55.30%	8,054	8.63%	358	0.38%	-18,303	-19.61%	93,371
Totals	2,259,405	47.59%	2,090,017	44.02%	378,582	7.97%	19,924	0.42%	169,388	3.57%	4,747,928

==== Counties that flipped from Democratic to Republican ====
- Adams
- Armstrong
- Schuylkill
- Bucks
- Berks
- Bedford
- Blair
- Bradford
- Butler
- Cameron
- Chester
- Centre
- Clarion
- Columbia
- Crawford
- Delaware
- Cumberland
- Dauphin
- Forest
- Franklin
- Fulton
- Huntingdon
- Jefferson
- Juniata
- Indiana
- Lancaster
- Lehigh
- Montgomery
- Mifflin
- Montour
- Somerset
- Sullivan
- York
- Clinton
- Clearfield
- Mercer
- Lycoming
- McKean
- Monroe
- Northumberland
- Perry
- Pike
- Potter
- Susquehanna
- Tioga
- Venango
- Wyoming
- Warren

== See also ==
- United States presidential elections in Pennsylvania
