= 2000 United States presidential election in Pennsylvania =

- November 7, 2000
- Turnout: 63.0% (▼3.1 pp)

Nominee	Al Gore	George W. Bush
Party	Democratic	Republican
Home state	Tennessee	Texas
Running mate	Joe Lieberman	Dick Cheney
Electoral vote	23	0
Popular vote	2,485,967	2,281,127
Percentage	50.60%	46.43%

Gore
40–50%
50–60%
60–70%
70–80%
80–90%
90–100%
Bush
40–50%
50–60%
60–70%
70–80%
80–90%
90–100%
Tie
President before election
Bill Clinton
Democratic
Elected President
George W. Bush
Republican

The 2000 United States presidential election in Pennsylvania took place on November 7, 2000, and was part of the 2000 United States presidential election. Voters chose 23 representatives, or electors, to the Electoral College, who voted for president and vice president.

Because President Bill Clinton, a Democrat, had won two elections, he could not run for a third term under the provision of the Twenty-second Amendment to the United States Constitution. The Democratic presidential nominee, Vice President Al Gore, won Pennsylvania by a 4.17% margin of victory over his Republican opponent, Texas Governor George W. Bush. However, voter enthusiasm for both candidates was generally low throughout the campaign. Gore failed to capture Clinton's appeal in strongly Democratic regions such as Pittsburgh and Scranton and thus carried these areas by a smaller number than his predecessor. However, opposition to Bush was particularly strong in the suburban counties of Philadelphia; although these areas at the time were typically Republican-leaning, they featured a strong culturally liberal bent, and thus Bush was unable to appeal to voters. Bush support was particularly strong in rural, central Pennsylvania, where he appealed to Evangelical voters and where Gore's connection to gun control policies was strongly rejected. Marginal wins in both of the state's metropolitan areas helped the Vice President to capture the state. This was the first election since 1968 that the candidate who won Pennsylvania did not win the general election, and only the fourth time that has happened since 1916. As of the 2024 presidential election, this is the last election in which Greene County, Mercer County, and Lawrence County voted for the Democratic candidate.

Bush became the first Republican ever to win the White House without carrying Delaware County, the first to win the White House without carrying Montgomery County since Rutherford B. Hayes in 1876, the first to win the White House without carrying Bucks County – which he had lost by precisely the same margin he had lost the state as a whole – since Benjamin Harrison in 1888, and the first to win the White House without carrying Lehigh County since William McKinley in 1900.

Pennsylvania was one of ten states that backed George H. W. Bush for president in 1988 that did not back George W. Bush in either 2000 or 2004. In 2000, George W. Bush lost in eleven states his father won in 1988. In 2004, this was reduced to ten through George W. Bush's gains of New Mexico and Iowa, and his loss in New Hampshire.

== Primary elections ==
=== Democratic primary ===
The Democratic primary was held on April 4. There were 191 delegates at stake, with 160 pledged and 31 unpledged. Vice President Al Gore won 139 pledged and the support of 28 unpledged, while U.S. Senator Bill Bradley won 21 pledged.

Candidates	Votes	Percent
Al Gore	525,306	74.60%
Bill Bradley	146,797	20.85%
Lyndon LaRouche	32,047	4.55%
Totals	704,150	Turnout: 19.38%

=== Republican primary ===
The Republican primary was held on April 4. There were 78 delegates at stake, with 68 district delegates being decided in the primary and 10 statewide delegates being decided at the state committee meeting in May. While all delegates were technically unbound, Texas Governor George W. Bush won the support of all 78 delegates.

Candidates	Votes	Percent
George W. Bush	472,008	73.44%
John McCain	145,719	22.67%
Others	24,967	3.88%
Totals	642,694	Turnout: 20.33%

== General election ==
=== Polling ===
Poll source	Date(s)	Sample size	Margin of error	George W. Bush (R)	Al Gore (D)	Ralph Nader (G)	Other / undecided (Note: Calculated by taking the difference of 100% and all other listed candidates combined. For polls that do not report a figure for Nader, this includes his support.)
Rasmussen Reports	November 5, 2000	1,091	—	47%	43%	—	10%
Zogby Analytics	November 4, 2000	600	—	42%	50%	6%	2%
Harris Insights & Analytics	November 2, 2000	11,301	—	45%	50%	4%	1%
Mason-Dixon Polling & Strategy	November 2, 2000	625	—	45%	48%	—	7%
Rasmussen Reports	November 2, 2000	644	—	47%	42%	—	11%
Decision Forecasting	November 1, 2000	1,032	—	43%	47%	4%	6%
SurveyUSA	November 1, 2000	800	—	48%	48.01%	—	3.99%
Zogby Analytics	November 1, 2000	600	—	42%	43%	8%	7%
American Research Group	October 31, 2000	600	—	42%	48%	3%	7%
SurveyUSA	October 31, 2000	800	—	48%	47%	—	5%
Rasmussen Reports	October 29, 2000	967	—	45%	42%	—	13%
Zogby Analytics	October 29, 2000	600	—	42%	46%	5%	7%
Los Angeles Times	October 28, 2000	420	—	47%	45%	2%	6%
Millersville University Center for Politics and Public Affairs	October 28, 2000	550	—	43%	42%	5%	10%
Opinion Dynamics	October 26, 2000	600	—	39%	42%	7%	12%
Zogby Analytics	October 26, 2000	600	—	47%	40%	3%	10%
Lake Research Partners/The Tarrance Group	October 24, 2000	400	—	40%	45%	5%	10%
American Research Group	October 22, 2000	600	—	43%	48%	2%	7%
Public Opinion Strategies (R) (Note: Poll conducted for an unspecified Republican sponsor.)	October 22, 2000	800	—	45%	43%	3%	9%
West Chester University	October 21, 2000	600 (Note: Sample size unavailable; 600 is a default estimate used in the source dataset.)	—	33%	44%	1%	22%
Rasmussen Reports	October 18, 2000	1,043	—	43%	42%	—	15%
Lincoln Institute	October 17, 2000	728	—	42%	42%	4%	12%
SurveyUSA	October 17, 2000	800	—	48%	47%	—	5%

=== Results ===
2000 United States presidential election in Pennsylvania
Party	Candidate	Votes	Percentage	Electoral votes
Democratic	Al Gore	2,485,967	50.60%	23
Republican	George W. Bush	2,281,127	46.43%	0
Green	Ralph Nader	103,392	2.10%	0
Reform	Pat Buchanan	16,023	0.33%	0
Constitution	Howard Phillips	14,428	0.29%	0
Libertarian	Harry Browne	11,248	0.23%	0
Write-ins	-	934	0.02%	0
Totals		4,913,119	100.00%	23
Voter turnout (voting age/registered)				53%/63%

==== By county ====
County	Al Gore Democratic		George W. Bush Republican		Various candidates Other parties		Margin		Total votes cast
County	#	%	#	%	#	%	#	%	Total votes cast
Adams	11,682	34.93%	20,848	62.34%	914	2.73%	-9,166	-27.41%	33,444
Allegheny	329,963	56.65%	235,361	40.41%	17,154	2.94%	94,602	16.24%	582,478
Armstrong	11,127	40.58%	15,508	56.55%	788	2.87%	-4,381	-15.97%	27,423
Beaver	38,925	52.85%	32,491	44.12%	2,233	3.03%	6,434	8.73%	73,649
Bedford	5,474	28.17%	13,598	69.97%	363	1.86%	-8,124	-41.80%	19,435
Berks	59,150	43.72%	71,273	52.68%	4,874	3.60%	-12,123	-8.96%	135,297
Blair	15,774	34.94%	28,376	62.86%	990	2.20%	-12,602	-27.92%	45,140
Bradford	7,911	33.88%	14,660	62.78%	781	3.34%	-6,749	-28.90%	23,352
Bucks	132,914	50.46%	121,927	46.29%	8,581	3.25%	10,987	4.17%	263,422
Butler	25,037	35.34%	44,009	62.12%	1,803	2.54%	-18,972	-26.78%	70,849
Cambria	30,308	50.27%	28,001	46.45%	1,977	3.28%	2,307	3.82%	60,286
Cameron	779	34.68%	1,383	61.58%	84	3.74%	-604	-26.90%	2,246
Carbon	10,668	50.14%	9,717	45.67%	892	4.19%	951	4.47%	21,277
Centre	21,409	43.19%	26,172	52.79%	1,994	4.02%	-4,763	-9.60%	49,575
Chester	82,047	43.72%	100,080	53.33%	5,549	2.95%	-18,033	-9.61%	187,676
Clarion	5,605	35.37%	9,796	61.81%	448	2.82%	-4,191	-26.44%	15,849
Clearfield	11,718	38.25%	18,019	58.82%	896	2.93%	-6,301	-20.57%	30,633
Clinton	5,521	46.03%	6,064	50.56%	409	3.41%	-543	-4.53%	11,994
Columbia	8,975	40.96%	12,095	55.20%	841	3.84%	-3,120	-14.24%	21,911
Crawford	13,250	39.76%	18,858	56.58%	1,220	3.66%	-5,608	-16.82%	33,328
Cumberland	31,053	35.23%	54,802	62.17%	2,289	2.60%	-23,749	-26.94%	88,144
Dauphin	44,390	44.10%	53,631	53.28%	2,637	2.62%	-9,241	-9.18%	100,658
Delaware	134,861	54.36%	105,836	42.66%	7,380	2.98%	29,025	11.70%	248,077
Elk	5,754	42.37%	7,347	54.10%	479	3.53%	-1,593	-11.73%	13,580
Erie	59,399	52.88%	49,027	43.64%	3,909	3.48%	10,372	9.24%	112,335
Fayette	28,152	56.84%	20,013	40.40%	1,367	2.76%	8,139	16.44%	49,532
Forest	843	36.93%	1,371	60.05%	69	3.02%	-528	-23.12%	2,283
Franklin	14,922	30.44%	33,042	67.41%	1,055	2.15%	-18,120	-36.97%	49,019
Fulton	1,425	26.96%	3,753	71.01%	107	2.03%	-2,328	-44.05%	5,285
Greene	7,230	52.96%	5,890	43.14%	533	3.90%	1,340	9.82%	13,653
Huntingdon	5,073	31.78%	10,408	65.21%	480	3.01%	-5,335	-33.43%	15,961
Indiana	13,667	43.52%	16,799	53.50%	935	2.98%	-3,132	-9.98%	31,401
Jefferson	5,566	31.65%	11,473	65.24%	547	3.11%	-5,907	-33.59%	17,586
Juniata	2,656	30.64%	5,795	66.86%	216	2.50%	-3,139	-36.22%	8,667
Lackawanna	57,471	59.63%	35,096	36.41%	3,814	3.96%	22,375	23.22%	96,381
Lancaster	54,968	31.34%	115,900	66.09%	4,499	2.57%	-60,932	-34.75%	175,367
Lawrence	20,593	51.95%	18,060	45.56%	987	2.49%	2,533	6.39%	39,640
Lebanon	16,093	35.06%	28,534	62.17%	1,270	2.77%	-12,441	-27.11%	45,897
Lehigh	56,667	48.72%	55,492	47.71%	4,148	3.57%	1,175	1.01%	116,307
Luzerne	62,199	52.01%	52,328	43.76%	5,059	4.23%	9,871	8.25%	119,586
Lycoming	14,663	33.95%	27,137	62.83%	1,393	3.22%	-12,474	-28.88%	43,193
McKean	5,510	34.86%	9,661	61.12%	635	4.02%	-4,151	-26.26%	15,806
Mercer	23,817	48.87%	23,132	47.47%	1,783	3.66%	685	1.40%	48,732
Mifflin	4,835	33.08%	9,400	64.32%	379	2.60%	-4,565	-31.24%	14,614
Monroe	21,939	46.80%	23,265	49.63%	1,674	3.57%	-1,326	-2.83%	46,878
Montgomery	177,990	53.54%	145,623	43.81%	8,809	2.65%	32,367	9.73%	332,422
Montour	2,356	36.27%	3,960	60.97%	179	2.76%	-1,604	-24.70%	6,495
Northampton	53,097	50.72%	47,396	45.27%	4,197	4.01%	5,701	5.45%	104,690
Northumberland	13,670	41.11%	18,142	54.56%	1,442	4.33%	-4,472	-13.45%	33,254
Perry	4,459	27.73%	11,184	69.56%	436	2.71%	-6,725	-41.83%	16,079
Philadelphia	449,182	80.04%	100,959	17.99%	11,039	1.97%	348,223	62.05%	561,180
Pike	7,330	42.21%	9,339	53.78%	695	4.01%	-2,009	-11.57%	17,364
Potter	2,037	28.71%	4,858	68.48%	199	2.81%	-2,821	-39.77%	7,094
Schuylkill	26,215	44.97%	29,841	51.19%	2,244	3.84%	-3,626	-6.22%	58,300
Snyder	3,536	27.54%	8,963	69.80%	342	2.66%	-5,427	-42.26%	12,841
Somerset	12,028	36.47%	20,218	61.29%	739	2.24%	-8,190	-24.82%	32,985
Sullivan	1,066	34.33%	1,928	62.09%	111	3.58%	-862	-27.76%	3,105
Susquehanna	6,481	37.53%	10,226	59.21%	564	3.26%	-3,745	-21.68%	17,271
Tioga	4,617	31.26%	9,635	65.22%	520	3.52%	-5,018	-33.96%	14,772
Union	4,209	31.95%	8,523	64.69%	443	3.36%	-4,314	-32.74%	13,175
Venango	8,196	39.90%	11,642	56.68%	703	3.42%	-3,446	-16.78%	20,541
Warren	7,537	42.94%	9,290	52.93%	725	4.13%	-1,753	-9.99%	17,552
Washington	44,961	53.25%	37,339	44.22%	2,141	2.53%	7,622	9.03%	84,441
Wayne	6,904	36.50%	11,201	59.21%	811	4.29%	-4,297	-22.71%	18,916
Westmoreland	71,792	45.81%	80,858	51.60%	4,059	2.59%	-9,066	-5.79%	156,709
Wyoming	4,363	37.26%	6,922	59.12%	424	3.62%	-2,559	-21.86%	11,709
York	51,958	36.01%	87,652	60.75%	4,676	3.24%	-35,694	-24.74%	144,286
Totals	2,485,967	50.60%	2,281,127	46.43%	146,025	2.97%	204,840	4.17%	4,913,119

Counties that flipped from Democratic to Republican

- Armstrong (largest city: Kittanning)
- Centre (largest city: State College)
- Clinton (largest city: Lock Haven)
- Columbia (largest city: Bloomsburg)
- Elk (largest city: St. Marys)
- Forest (largest city: Marienville)
- Indiana (largest city: Indiana)
- Schuylkill (largest city: Pottsville)
- Warren (largest city: Warren)
- Westmoreland (largest township: Hempfield Township)

==== By congressional district ====
Gore won 11 of 21 congressional districts. Gore won three that elected Republicans while Bush won two that elected Democrats.

District	Gore	Bush	Representative
1st	85%	13%	Bob Brady
2nd	88%	10%	Chaka Fattah
3rd	66%	31%	Robert Borski
4th	47%	50%	Ron Klink
4th	47%	50%	Melissa Hart
5th	38%	58%	John E. Peterson
6th	44%	53%	Tim Holden
7th	50%	47%	Curt Weldon
8th	50%	46%	James C. Greenwood
9th	32%	65%	Bud Shuster
10th	47%	50%	Don Sherwood
11th	49%	47%	Paul Kanjorski
12th	45%	52%	John Murtha
13th	54%	43%	Joe Hoeffel
14th	62%	35%	William J. Coyne
15th	49%	47%	Pat Toomey
16th	39%	58%	Joe Pitts
17th	37%	60%	George Gekas
18th	57%	41%	Mike Doyle
19th	36%	61%	William F. Goodling
19th	36%	61%	Todd Platts
20th	51%	47%	Frank Mascara
21st	48%	49%	Phil English

== Electors ==
The electors of each state and the District of Columbia met on December 18, 2000 to cast their votes for president and vice president. The Electoral College itself never meets as one body. Instead, the electors from each state and the District of Columbia met in their respective capitols.

The following were the members of the Electoral College from the state. All were pledged to and voted for Al Gore and Joe Lieberman:

1. Kathy Black
2. Richard W. Bloomingdale
3. Robert P. Casey Jr.
4. Nelson Diaz
5. William M. George
6. Ken Jarin
7. James J. Johnston
8. Edward Keller
9. Robert Mellow
10. Thomas J. Murphy Jr.
11. Elsa Favila
12. Robert O'Connor
13. Lazar M. Palnick
14. Stephen R. Reed
15. T. J. Rooney
16. Joyce Savocchio
17. John F. Street
18. Patsy J. Tallarico
19. Christine M. Tartaglione
20. Margaret M. Tartaglione
21. Marian Tasco
22. Sala Udin
23. Anna Verna

== See also ==
- United States presidential elections in Pennsylvania
