= Zambelli Fireworks =

US fireworks company

- Founded: 1893 in Naples, Italy; August 3, 1960 in Pennsylvania
- Founder: Antonio Zambelli
- Headquarters: Warrendale, Pennsylvania though originally founded in New Castle, United States
- Key people: George Zambelli, Sr. & George Zambelli Jr., MD.
- Products: Pyrotechnics, Fireworks, Special Effects

Zambelli Fireworks is a fireworks company based in New Castle, Pennsylvania in the Pittsburgh metropolitan area. The company was founded in Naples, Italy by Antonio Zambelli in 1893. Zambelli immigrated to the United States and established "Zambelli Fireworks Manufacturing Company" in New Castle, incorporating it on August 3, 1960.

== Productions ==
Zambelli Fireworks is credited by the Guinness Book of World Records for shooting fireworks from the highest altitude, off the U.S. Steel Tower in Pittsburgh. They have also produced shows at Mount Rushmore, New Year's Eve at Times Square, the Las Vegas Strip, for Liberty Weekend celebrating the Statue of Liberty centennial, and annually for Thunder Over Louisville. They have also produced shows in Nicaragua, Puerto Rico, Mexico, Canada, Guam, Kuwait and the Bahamas. In 2005, the Zambelli family received the Pennsylvania Association of Broadcasters Gold Medal for excellence in entertainment. On October 4, 2008, Zambelli launched fireworks from a record 17 different locations around Downtown Pittsburgh to celebrate the city's 250th anniversary. The 17 locations surpassed Zambelli's own achievements of 10 for Pittsburgh's New Year's Eve 2000 show, and 13 on the Las Vegas Strip. The company produces over 2,000 shows annually, 800 of which take place during the Fourth of July holiday. Aside from its global headquarters in New Castle, Pennsylvania. Zambelli Fireworks has offices in Boca Raton, Florida, Shafter, California, Frederick, Maryland, Raleigh, North Carolina, Myrtle Beach, South Carolina, Denver, Colorado, Brainerd, Minnesota, and Cincinnati, Ohio.

== In media ==
Zambelli has produced shows that have been televised on "MSNBC Investigates", the Odyssey Network, the Discovery Channel, The Learning Channel, The National Geographic Channel and the BBC. In 2008, Zambelli was featured in the Discovery Channel series MythBusters. Zambelli assisted the crew in recreating a 15th-century Korean hwacha, a cart that shot 200 explosive arrows. Zambelli was also the focus of a 2009 episode of National Geographic Channel's Naked Science. In 2011 they were featured on Only in America with Larry the Cable Guy on History. In 2026, Zambelli's history in Pittsburgh was mentioned in the HBO Max show "The Pitt" by the patient Louie in Season 2 Episode 3.

== Legal ==
In January 2017, The Federal Bureau of Alcohol, Tobacco and Firearms (ATF) ordered Zambelli to shut down for two weeks and fined them $200,000 after discovering stolen fireworks at the home of a former employee. During an unrelated investigation, the state police discovered the missing fireworks in 2014 and turned the matter over to the ATF. Zambelli was apparently unaware that the fireworks were missing and was ordered to revamp its recordkeeping system. No events were cancelled as a result of the enforced shutdown.

== Gallery ==
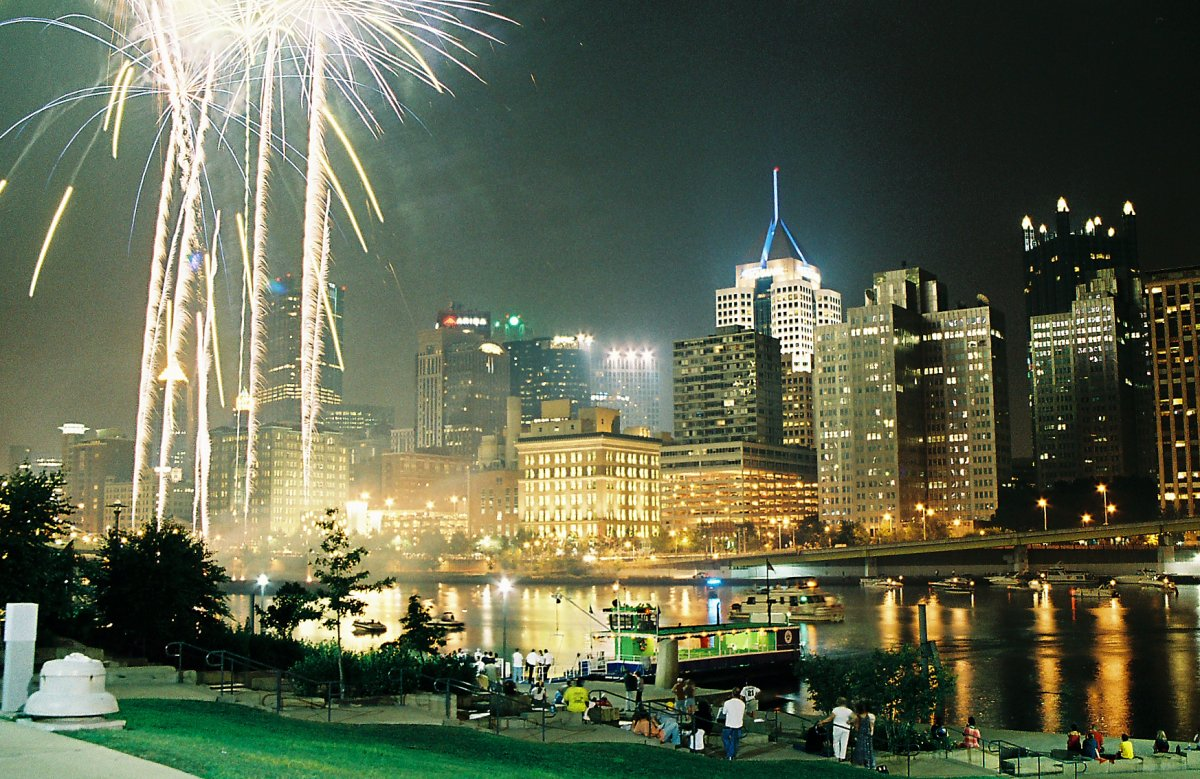
Skyblast fireworks display by Zambelli Fireworks at PNC Park after an August 26, 2006 game between Pittsburgh Pirates and Houston Astros

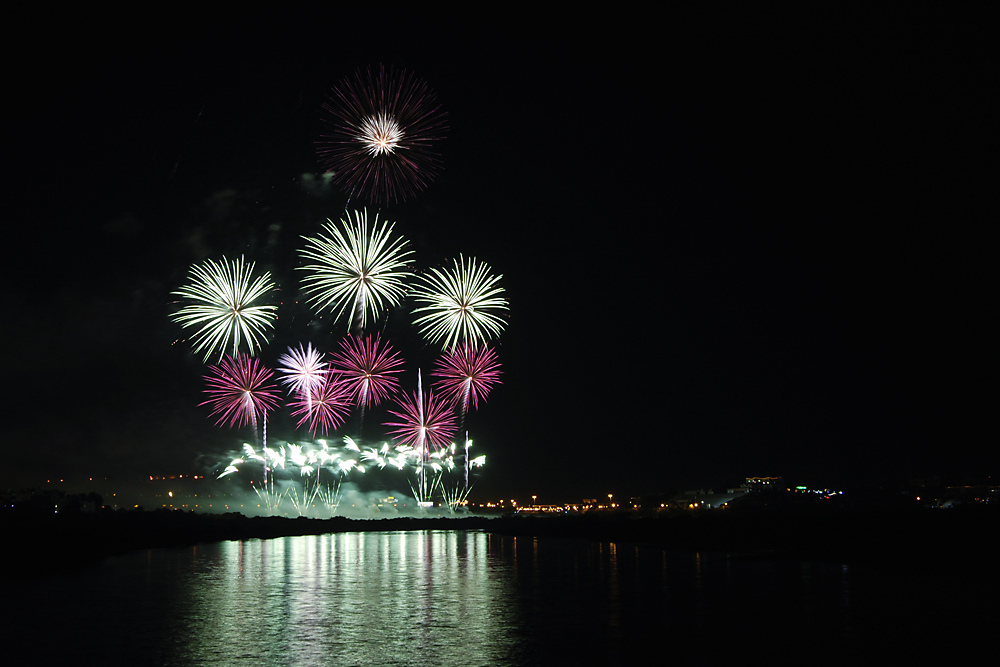
Zambelli Fireworks display at the 2010 World Fireworks Championship in Oman
