= John Blangero =

American human geneticist

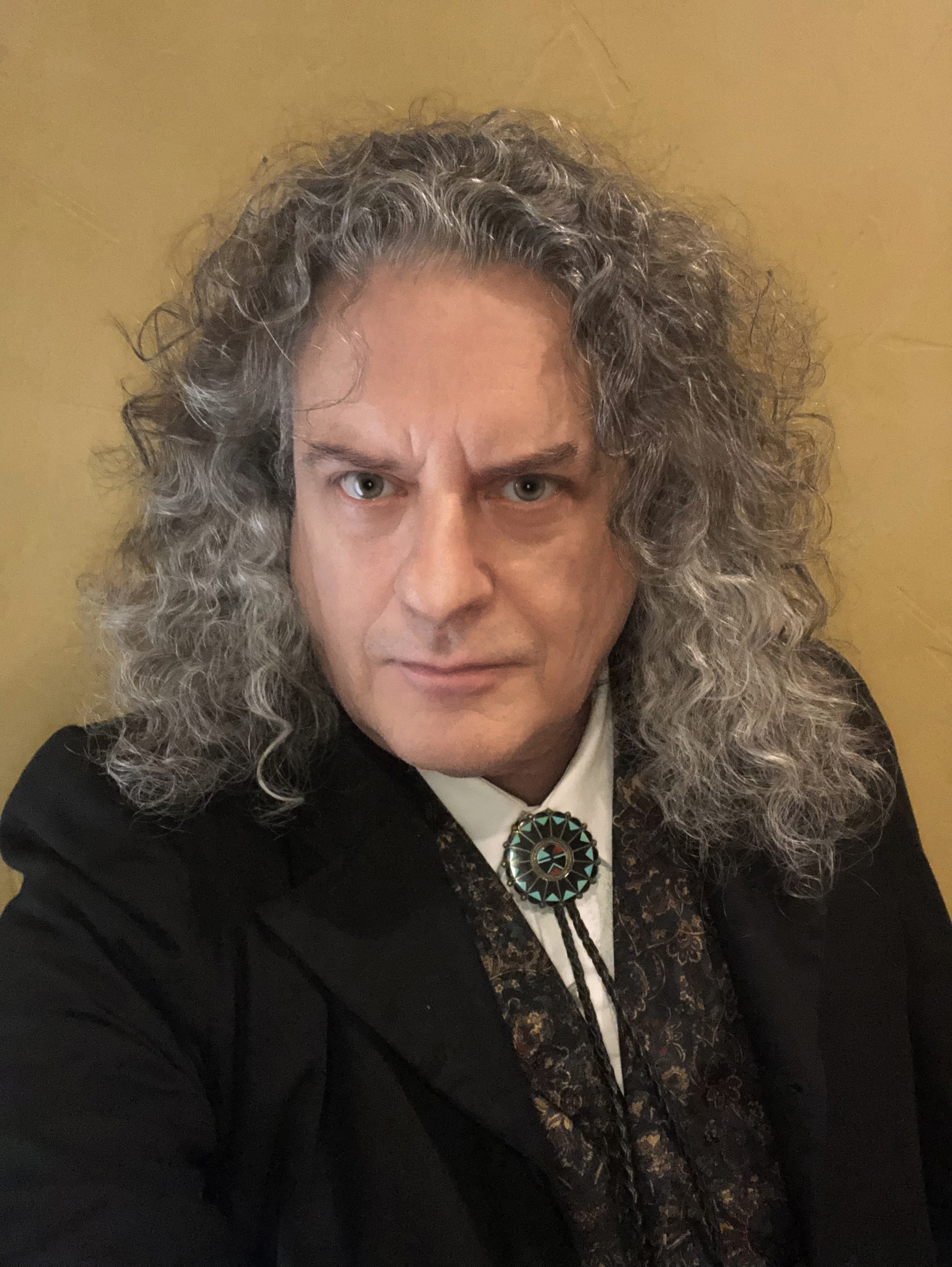
- Born: New Castle, Pennsylvania
- Education: Youngstown State University; Case Western Reserve University
- Scientific career
- Fields: Human genetics
- Workplaces: Southwest Foundation for Biomedical Research; University of Texas Rio Grande Valley
- Thesis: Population Genetic Approaches to Phenotypic Microevolution in the Jirels of Nepal (1987)

John Blangero is an American human geneticist who ranks in the top 3000 researchers in the world in terms of scholarly citations. His research has been highly funded by the National Institutes of Health where he is reported to have obtained more than $64 million in direct funding for genetic studies of common diseases such as cardiovascular disease, diabetes, and psychiatric diseases. He is a professor in the Department of Human Genetics at the University of Texas Rio Grande Valley (UTRGV) School of Medicine in Brownsville, Texas, where he is also Director of the Genomics Computing Center at the South Texas Diabetes and Obesity Institute. In addition, he serves as director of the San Antonio Family Heart Study, and played a major role in organizing the construction of the 11,000-processor computer cluster MEDUSA, which he and his collaborators use for genetic research at UTRGV. Before joining UTRGV, he worked at the Southwest Foundation for Biomedical Research. His research has included a project focused on studying the function and structure of the human brain, for which he collaborated with David Glahn of Yale University. He has also studied the genetic and environmental causes of diabetes and fatty liver disease among the Mexican American population in South Texas.
