= New Bedford, Pennsylvania =

Unincorporated community in Pennsylvania, US

- Census-designated place
- Location within Pennsylvania Location within the United States
- Coordinates: 41°5′50″N 80°30′17″W
- Country: United States
- State: Pennsylvania
- County: Lawrence County
- Township: Pulaski

Area
  - Total: 2.56 sq mi (6.62 km^{2})
  - Land: 2.55 sq mi (6.61 km^{2})
  - Water: 0.0039 sq mi (0.01 km^{2})
- Elevation: 1,145 ft (349 m)

Population (2020)
  - Total: 857
  - Density: 335.8/sq mi (129.66/km^{2})
- Time zone: UTC-4 (EST)
  - Summer (DST): UTC-5 (EDT)
- Area code: 724
- FIPS code: 42-53192
- GNIS feature ID: 1193012

New Bedford is an unincorporated community and census-designated place (CDP) in Lawrence County, Pennsylvania, United States. The population was 925 at the 2010 census.

== Geography ==
New Bedford is located in the northwestern corner of Lawrence County at 41°5′50″N 80°30′17″W (41.0975, -80.5051), in western Pulaski Township. The western edge of the CDP is the Ohio state line.

U.S. Route 422 (Ben Franklin Parkway) forms the southern edge of the CDP; the highway leads southeastward 10 miles (16 km) to New Castle, the Lawrence county seat, and west 8 miles (13 km) to Youngstown, Ohio. Pennsylvania Route 208 passes through the center of New Bedford, leading east 4 miles (6 km) to the village of Pulaski and Interstate 376.

According to the United States Census Bureau, the New Bedford CDP has a total area of 2.5 square miles (6.6 km^{2}), of which 0.004 square miles (0.01 km^{2}), or 0.14%, are water. Waters in the community drain northeastward to Deer Creek, an eastward-flowing tributary of the Shenango River, except for the southwesternmost part of the CDP, which drains south to Coffee Run, a tributary of the Mahoning River.

== Demographics ==
Historical population
Census	Pop.	Note	%±
2020	857		—
U.S. Decennial Census
