= New Castle News =

Newspaper in Pennsylvania, US

- Type: Daily newspaper
- Format: Broadsheet
- Owner: CNHI
- Publisher: Sharon Sorg
- Founded: ca. 1880
- Headquarters: 27 North Mercer Street, New Castle, Pennsylvania 16103 United States
- Circulation: 9,254 daily
- Website: ncnewsonline.com

The New Castle News is a six-day (Monday through Saturday) daily newspaper published in New Castle, Pennsylvania, and covering Lawrence County. It is owned by CNHI.

The News also publishes an 8,700-circulation weekly newspaper in nearby Ellwood City, Pennsylvania, called South County News.

== History ==
"The Weekly News was started in the spring of 1879. The Daily City News was started in the fall of 1880. W.J. BANNON, now dead, has the honor of starting these papers. He and Mr. J.T. GLEASON borrowed the money to buy the type from Geo. E. TREADWELL. Mr. GLEASON retired from the paper because there was not money enough in the enterprise to support both him ad Mr. BANNON. Mr. BANNON had associated with him in the Daily enterprise Mr. G.W. SHAW and Mr. Jeff. N. REYNOLDS. These latter withdrew in a brief space. Mr. REYNOLDS is dead, and Mr. SHAW is the local editor of the Guardian. Ill health compelled Mr. BANNON to give up work in July 1881 and he went West for a few months. He did not regain strength, and returned home to die. The office had made no money, other than a living for Mr. BANNON. Mr. TREADWELL was compelled to take charge of the papers. He increased the material until the outfit of the office was equal to that of any similar enterprise in Western Pennsylvania. It cost about $18,000 to do this. The paper is now operated by the NEWS Co. Limited, in which Mr. TREADWELL holds nearly all the stock. The [21] circulation of the WEEKLY NEWS has been increased in the County, until in the Country districts is equal to that of all the other papers published in New Castle. The expenses of the office are over $200 a week, the most of which is paid to employees, and spent in this City."

The first issue of the Weekly News appeared on December 15, 1880, under the ownership of George E. Treadwell and William J. Bannan.

After the death of George E. Treadwell, the paper continued to be published in 1894 by Robert M. Winter, a manager and editor employed by Sarah G Treadwell, George's widow.

On July 30, 1882, Fred L. Rentz, a farm boy of 13, began work at the News as a Printer’s Devil, doing odd jobs. He worked his way up the ranks; and after Mr. Treadwell’s death in 1896, Mrs. Treadwell named Rentz manager of the 800 –circulation paper. He later became part-owner, although the Treadwell family remained majority stockholders until the newspaper was sold in 1988. Fred L. Rentz died in 1946. His son, Jacob Rentz, became President and Publisher.

Jake Rentz was President and Publisher of the News until his death in 1954. Jake's son, Richard was left to run the paper. Younger brother, J. Fred Rentz, was living in California at the time. In 1954 Richard Rentz and mother, Alice Rentz, asked Fred to return to New Castle to help run the News. Richard eventually retired in 1986. Richard Rentz, Jr. became publisher and Fred became president, operating the paper until 1988 when it was sold.
