= Dommartin-sous-Amance =

- Commune
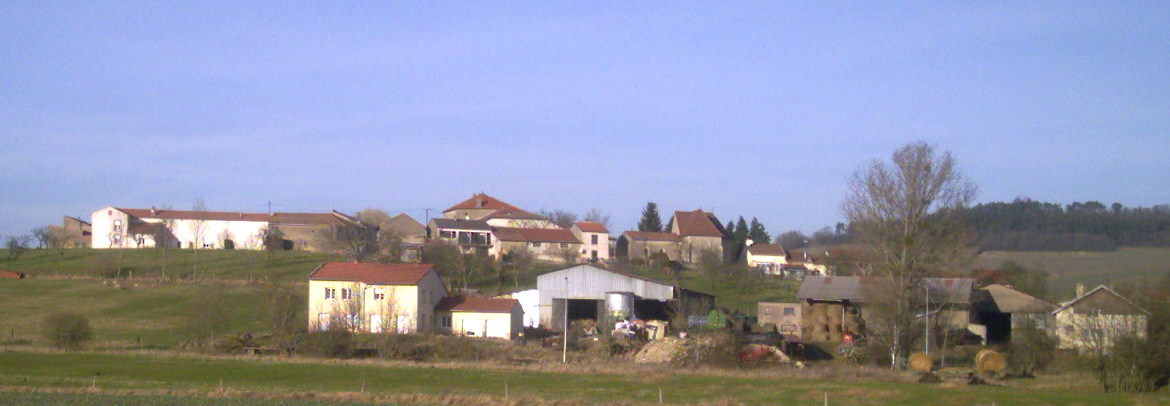
- A general view of Dommartin-sous-Amance

- Coat of arms
- Location of Dommartin-sous-Amance
- Location within France Location within Grand Est
- Coordinates: 48°44′30″N 6°15′22″E
- Country: France
- Region: Grand Est
- Department: Meurthe-et-Moselle
- Arrondissement: Nancy
- Canton: Grand Couronné
- Intercommunality: CC Seille et Grand Couronné

Government
  - Mayor (2020–2026): Dominique Mathey
- Area^{1}: 4.03 km^{2} (1.56 sq mi)
- Elevation: 213 m (699 ft)
- Highest elevation: 350 m (1,150 ft)
- Lowest elevation: 206 m (676 ft)
- Population (2023): 319
  - Density: 79.2/km^{2} (205/sq mi)
- Time zone: UTC+01:00 (CET)
  - Summer (DST): UTC+02:00 (CEST)
- INSEE/Postal code: 54168 /54770
- ^{1} French Land Register data, which excludes lakes, ponds, glaciers > 1 km^{2} (0.386 sq mi or 247 acres) and river estuaries.

Dommartin-sous-Amance (French pronunciation: [dɔmaʁtɛ̃ su.z‿amɑ̃s], literally Dommartin under Amance) is a commune in the Meurthe-et-Moselle department in north-eastern France.

The commune covers an area of 4.03 km^{2} (1.56 sq mi). Dominique Mathey is the mayor for the 2020-2026 tenure.

== Demography ==
Historical population
Year	Pop.	±% p.a.
1968	221	—
1975	279	+3.39%
1982	300	+1.04%
1990	282	−0.77%
1999	290	+0.31%
2007	260	−1.36%
2012	256	−0.31%
2017	278	+1.66%
2023	319	+2.32%
Source: INSEE

== See also ==
- Communes of the Meurthe-et-Moselle department
