= New Beaver, Pennsylvania =

Borough in Pennsylvania, US

- Borough
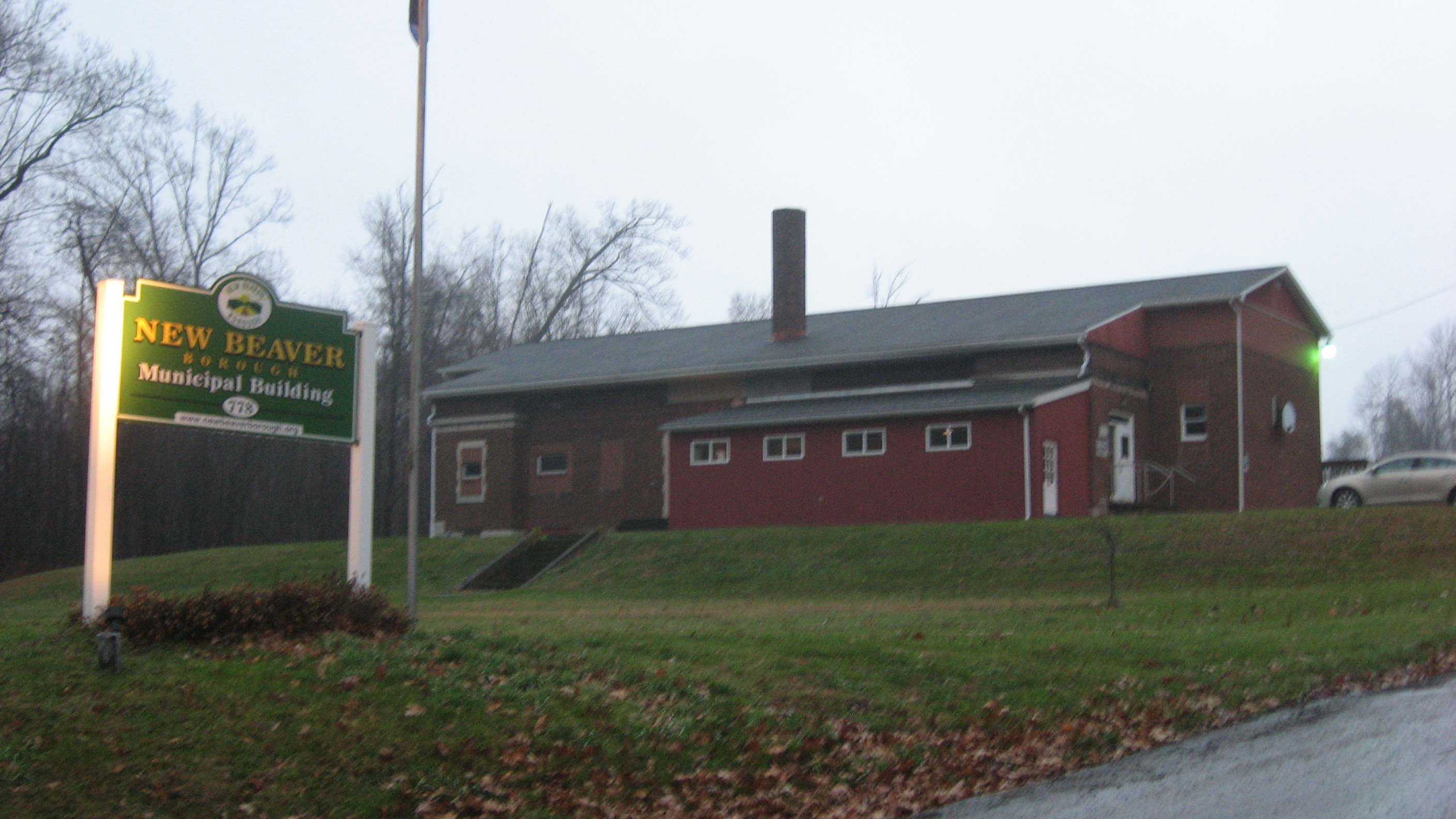
- Municipal building

- Location in Lawrence County, Pennsylvania
- Coordinates: 40°52′46″N 80°22′21″W
- Country: United States
- State: Pennsylvania
- County: Lawrence
- Established: 1849
- Incorporated (borough): November 18, 1959

Government
  - Mayor: Robert M. Crawford

Area
  - Total: 14.57 sq mi (37.73 km^{2})
  - Land: 14.45 sq mi (37.43 km^{2})
  - Water: 0.12 sq mi (0.31 km^{2})
- Highest elevation (east of PA 168): 1,285 ft (392 m)
- Lowest elevation (Beaver River): 735 ft (224 m)
  - Rank: lowest point in Lawrence County

Population (2020)
  - Total: 1,372
  - Density: 94.9/sq mi (36.66/km^{2})
- Time zone: UTC-4 (EST)
  - Summer (DST): UTC-5 (EDT)
- Area code: 724
- FIPS code: 42-53184
- Website: www.newbeaverborough.org

New Beaver is a borough in southern Lawrence County, Pennsylvania, United States. The population was 1,370 at the 2020 census. It is part of the Pittsburgh metropolitan area.

== History ==
Big Beaver Township was established as one of the thirteen original townships in Lawrence County during its incorporation in 1849. Initially, Big Beaver Township included what is now the borough of Wampum, but Wampum became a separate borough on February 19, 1876, the same year that the Wampum Cement and Lime Company began operations. The cement plant was located outside Wampum in what remained as Big Beaver Township.

There were five schools in Big Beaver Township in 1875. There were approximately 266 enrolled students. The average attendance was 170 and the school term was seven months.

The area of Big Beaver Township suffered growth and loss over the next seventy five years. Two world wars and several depressions saw the population and industry decline. Wampum, in search of a larger tax base, decided to annex the Medusa Cement Plant from Big Beaver Township. At that time, according to Pennsylvania state law, a township could not prevent a borough from annexing property and Wampum succeeded in annexing the property. Shortly after this, Ellwood City began to also consider annexing the property south of the cement plant. In 1958, Big Beaver Township trustees began the process of changing Big Beaver Township into the Borough of New Beaver in order to prevent the further annexation. The charter was signed on November 18, 1959, but the community continued to operate as a township until elections could be held in 1961.

== Geography ==
New Beaver is located at 40°52′46″N 80°22′21″W (40.879553, -80.372525).

According to the United States Census Bureau, the borough has a total area of 14.5 square miles (38 km^{2}), of which 14.5 square miles (38 km^{2}) is land and 0.04 square miles (0.10 km^{2}), or 0.28%, is water.

== Recreation ==
A portion of Pennsylvania State Game Lands Number 148 is located in New Beaver.

== Demographics ==
Historical population
Census	Pop.	Note	%±
1970	1,426		—
1980	1,885		32.2%
1990	1,736		−7.9%
2000	1,677		−3.4%
2010	1,502		−10.4%
2020	1,372		−8.7%
2021 (est.)	1,361	▼	−0.8%

As of the census of 2000, there were 1,677 people, 652 households, and 477 families residing in the borough. The population density was 115.9 inhabitants per square mile (44.7/km^{2}). There were 696 housing units at an average density of 48.1 per square mile (18.6/km^{2}). The racial makeup of the borough was 98.21% White, 1.43% African American, 0.12% Native American, 0.06% from other races, and 0.18% from two or more races. Hispanic or Latino of any race were 0.89% of the population.

There were 652 households, out of which 31.1% had children under the age of 18 living with them, 58.6% were married couples living together, 10.1% had a female householder with no husband present, and 26.7% were non-families. 23.3% of all households were made up of individuals, and 9.7% had someone living alone who was 65 years of age or older. The average household size was 2.57 and the average family size was 3.04.

In the borough the population was spread out, with 23.8% under the age of 18, 8.7% from 18 to 24, 28.3% from 25 to 44, 26.1% from 45 to 64, and 13.2% who were 65 years of age or older. The median age was 39 years. For every 100 females there were 100.4 males. For every 100 females age 18 and over, there were 98.4 males.

The median income for a household in the borough was $36,333, and the median income for a family was $39,492. Males had a median income of $31,509 versus $21,838 for females. The per capita income for the borough was $15,893. About 8.5% of families and 10.4% of the population were below the poverty line, including 14.9% of those under age 18 and 9.3% of those age 65 or over.

== Education ==
The Mohawk Area School District serves the borough.
