= George Zambelli =

Fireworks entertainer

George Zambelli, Sr.
- Born: October 19, 1924; New Castle, Pennsylvania, US
- Died: December 25, 2003 (aged 79); Pittsburgh, Pennsylvania, US
- Education: Duquesne University
- Occupation(s): Pyrotechnician, President
- Employer: Zambelli Fireworks
- Title: President
- Spouse: Constance "Connie" Thomas

George Zambelli, Sr. (October 19, 1924 – December 25, 2003) was an American fireworks entertainer, and long-time president and manager of Zambelli Fireworks, one of the oldest fireworks companies in the United States.

Zambelli died being treated for flu symptoms relating to a long battle with cancer at West Penn Hospital in Pittsburgh, Pennsylvania.
