= Mount Jackson, Pennsylvania =

Unincorporated community in Pennsylvania, US

- Unincorporated community
- Location within Pennsylvania Location within the United States
- Coordinates: 40°57′44″N 80°26′7″W
- Country: United States
- State: Pennsylvania
- County: Lawrence
- Township: North Beaver
- Established: 1815
- Elevation: 1,152 ft (351 m)
- Time zone: UTC-5
- Postal code: 16102
- Area codes: 724; 878
- GNIS feature ID: 1181724

Mount Jackson is a small village in Lawrence County, Pennsylvania. It was home to Battery B, a Union Army volunteer light artillery regiment that saw significant action in the American Civil War.

== History ==
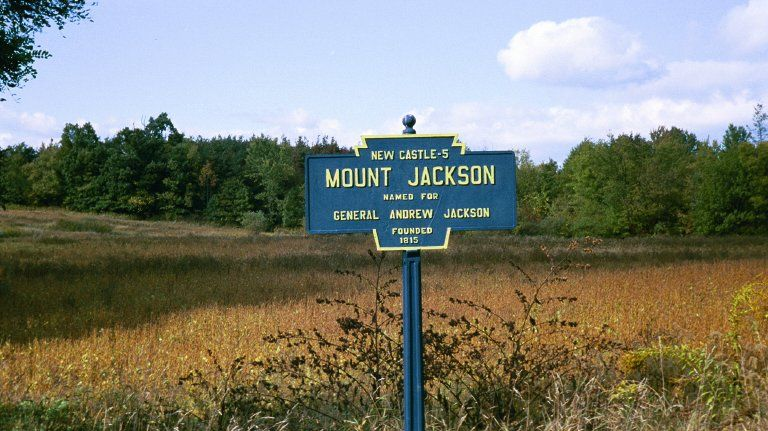
Keystone marker for Mount Jackson

North Beaver Township was formed in 1810, and Mount Jackson was founded within its boundaries five years later, eventually becoming recognized as the township's hub. Named for Andrew Jackson soon after his victory in the Battle of New Orleans, Mount Jackson was founded by John Nesbit on a plot of farmland that he owned. The farming village's earliest residents were mostly Scotch-Irish and Presbyterian, with many arriving from Cumberland County, Pennsylvania. The first person to build a house there was William Henry, who also became the village postmaster. The only stagecoach route from New Castle to the train station at Enon Valley ran through Mount Jackson until the Civil War, after which New Castle received its own train station.

The village was home to Battery B (or the "Mount Jackson Guards"), a Union Army volunteer light artillery regiment that saw significant action in the Civil War. On June 8, 1861, 80 area recruits left Mount Jackson and walked the nine miles to Enon Valley (along present-day Route 551) to board a train which would take them to Pittsburgh, and from there to the warfront. The village commemorated this event with its annual "Battery B Day", which marked the Union victory with a parade, reunion and memorial service for the fallen. It commenced in 1869 and was observed annually through the early 1930s, with the last veteran of the regiment dying in 1930. A 20 ft (6.1 m) monument commemorating their service was dedicated in 1912 by surviving veterans and placed on Route 108 at the cemetery right outside the village which holds the remains of American Revolutionary War and Civil War veterans. An original cannon from the Raritan Arsenal that was added to the monument in 1923 was moved to the North Beaver Township building in 2010.

Newly graduated high school students from the village were drafted to serve in the United States Armed Forces during World War II. After the war, the new neighborhood of Jackson Knolls was carved out of the adjacent forest known as Nesbit Grove (or Nesbit Woods), with the entrance to the development being located opposite the war memorial on Route 108. In 1964, the village felt the effects of the explosion at the American Cyanamid chemical plant in nearby Edinburg, with windows being blown out.

As of 1979, agriculture and dairy farming still constituted a significant part of the economy in Mount Jackson. The nearby borough of S.N.P.J. was created out of Mount Jackson farmland. The village celebrated its 200th birthday in 2015 with a parade, fireworks and a prayer service. As of August 2015, it was still a one-stoplight village. The Mount Jackson Museum, which was formed around this time, was to be housed in a reproduction Sinclair service station situated in proximity to the North Beaver Township building.

== Demographics ==
Historical population
Census	Pop.	Note	%±

The United States Census Bureau defined Mount Jackson as a census designated place (CDP) in 2023.

== Education ==
Historically, education in the village revolved around the Mount Jackson School and North Beaver Township High School. High school extracurricular activities included basketball and music, with the school featuring a 26-piece orchestra. In 1929, the Mount Jackson School building was repurposed into a trade school called the North Beaver Vocational High School, which offered courses in farming, woodworking and homemaking. The village is currently served by the Mohawk Area School District in nearby Bessemer. Founded in 1958, it operates Mohawk Elementary School and Mohawk Junior Senior High School.

== Transportation ==
=== Major roads and highways ===
- PA 108
- PA 317
- PA 551

== Notable people ==
- William McClelland (politician) (1842–1892), U.S. congressman and Civil War captain
- Donald W. Fox (1922–2021), Pennsylvania House of Representatives member
