= Pennsylvania Route 317 =

State highway in Lawrence County, Pennsylvania, US

Pennsylvania Route 317

Route information
- Maintained by PennDOT
- Length: 4.832 mi (7.776 km)

Major junctions
- West end: SR 630 at the Ohio state line west of Bessemer
- East end: PA 108 / PA 551in North Beaver Township

Location
- Country: United States
- State: Pennsylvania
- Counties: Lawrence

Highway system
- Pennsylvania State Route System; Interstate; US; State; Scenic; Legislative
| ← PA 316 | → PA 318 |

Pennsylvania Route 317 (PA 317, also designated by the Pennsylvania Department of Transportation as SR 317) is a 4.8-mile-long (7.7 km) state highway located in Lawrence County, Pennsylvania. The western terminus is at the Ohio state line near Bessemer, where it continues westward as Ohio State Route 630 (SR 630). The eastern terminus of PA 317 is at the junction of PA 108 and PA 551 in Mount Jackson, a portion of North Beaver Township.

== Route description ==
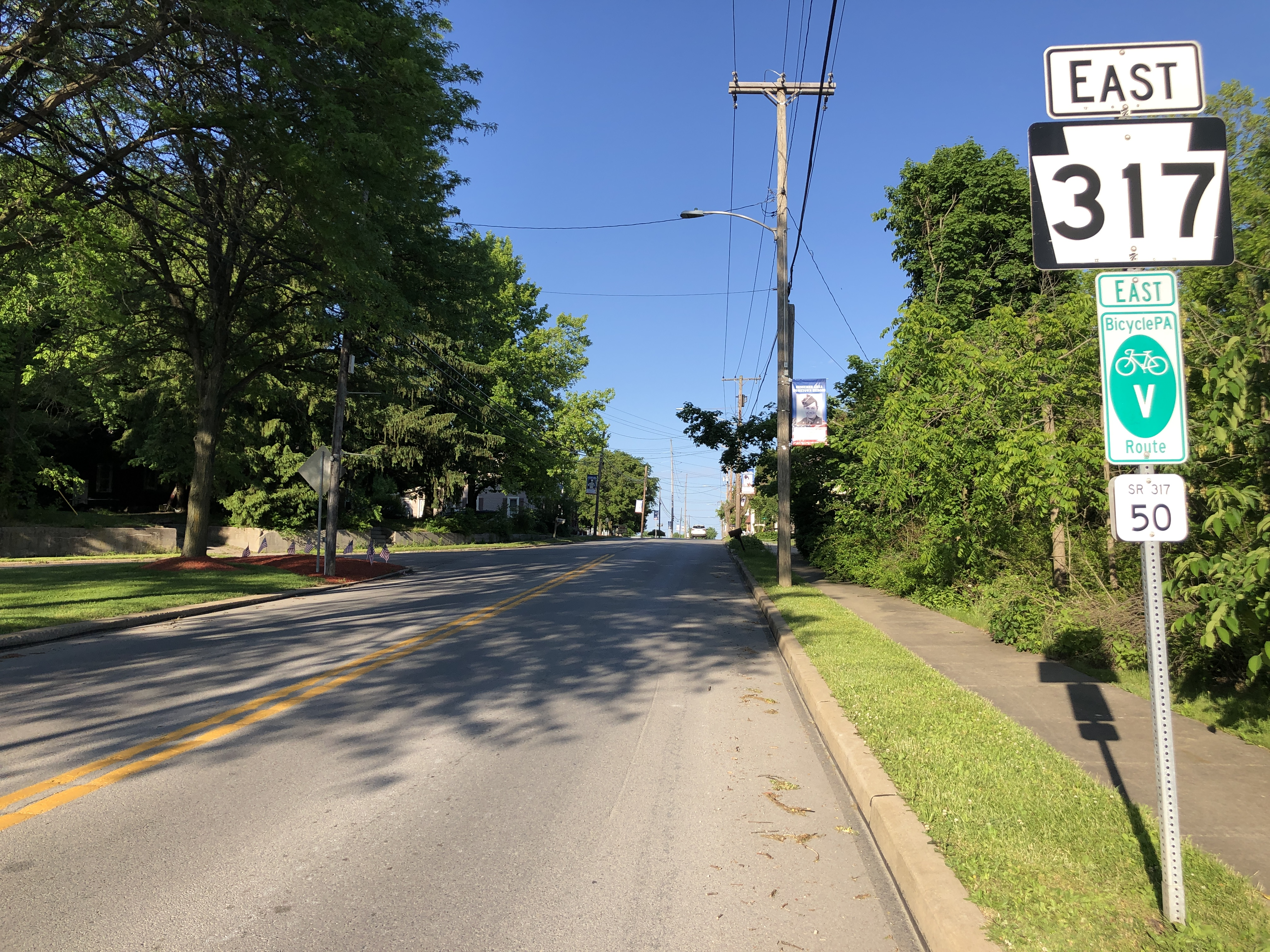
PA 317 eastbound in Bessemer

PA 317 begins at an intersection with Stateline Road on the Ohio–Pennsylvania state line as a continuation of SR 630 (East Calla Road). The highway progresses eastward from the state line as a two-lane rural highway through North Beaver Township as West Poland Road. PA 317 crosses a dirt road and soon through some swamplands before entering the borough of Bessemer. In Bessemer, the highway becomes the main thoroughfare, where it crosses through a large residential stretch until the intersection with First Covenant Road, where businesses follow the main street. PA 317 then passes to the south of Kennedy Park, a local borough-run park, and passes to the north of a large industrial site.

After the industrial complex, the highway continues eastward through a mix of surroundings ranging from the residences to the north and more industry to the south. Just before the intersection with Smalls Ferry Road, PA 317 leaves Bessemer. This route turns to the northeast and becomes largely rural once again. At the intersection with Mohawk School Road, the highway makes a turn to the southeast off of East Poland Road and onto Mohawk School Road, where the highway becomes residential once again. Continuing directly southwest, the surroundings mix and amidst a large residential area, PA 317 intersects with PA 551 (North Edinburg Road). PA 317 and PA 551 become concurrent, following North Edinburgh Road into Mount Jackson, where the road intersects with PA 108 (Mount Jackson Road). Here, PA 551 follows a concurrency with PA 108 west, while PA 317 terminates at this intersection.

== Major intersections ==
The entire route is in Lawrence County.

| Location | mi | km | Destinations | Notes |
|---|---|---|---|---|
| North Beaver Township | 0.000 | 0.000 | SR 630 west (East Calla Road) / Stateline Road | Ohio state line; western terminus of PA 317 |
| North Beaver Township | 4.610 | 7.419 | PA 551 north (North Edinburg Road) – Edinburg | Western terminus of PA 551 concurrency |
| North Beaver Township | 4.832 | 7.776 | PA 108 / PA 551 south (Mount Jackson Road) – New Castle, Enon Valley | Eastern terminus of PA 317 and its concurrency with PA 551 |
1.000 mi = 1.609 km; 1.000 km = 0.621 mi: Concurrency terminus
