= Scott McCurley =

American football player and coach

Pittsburgh Steelers
- Title: Inside linebackers coach

Personal information
- Born: New Castle, Pennsylvania, U.S.

Career information
- Position: Linebacker
- High school: Mohawk (Bessemer, Pennsylvania)
- College: University of Pittsburgh

Career history
- Green Bay Packers (2006–2018); Coaching administrator intern (2006); Coaching administrator (2007–2008); Defensive quality control coach (2009–2013); Assistant linebackers coach (2014–2017); Defensive assistant (2018); Dallas Cowboys (2020–2024) Linebackers coach; Pittsburgh Steelers (2025–present) Inside linebackers coach

Awards and highlights
- Super Bowl champion (XLV)

Scott McCurley is an American football coach who is currently the inside linebackers coach for the Pittsburgh Steelers of the National Football League (NFL).

== Biography ==
Born in New Castle, Pennsylvania, McCurley graduated from Mohawk High school in Bessemer, Pennsylvania and attended the University of Pittsburgh. He is married to Colleen (Crisi) McCurley and has two children. They reside in Celina, Texas.

== Playing career ==
During college McCurley played linebacker with the Pittsburgh Panthers football team. Following graduation he remained with the program as a defensive graduate assistant.

== Coaching career ==
McCurley originally joined the Packers in 2006 as an intern before being named Coaching Administrator the following year. He was hired to his current position on February 3, 2009. On February 10, 2014, it was announced that McCurley was promoted to linebackers coach of the Packers. After the departure of Kevin Greene as outside linebackers coach, it was announced that Winston Moss would take over as coach of both the inside and outside linebackers, and McCurley will assist in whichever area he is needed. In 2020 he joined the Dallas Cowboys as the team's linebackers coach.

On February 15, 2025, the Pittsburgh Steelers hired McCurley to serve as their inside linebackers coach, replacing Aaron Curry.
