= McClelland Homestead =

Historic house in Pennsylvania, United States

- U.S. National Register of Historic Places
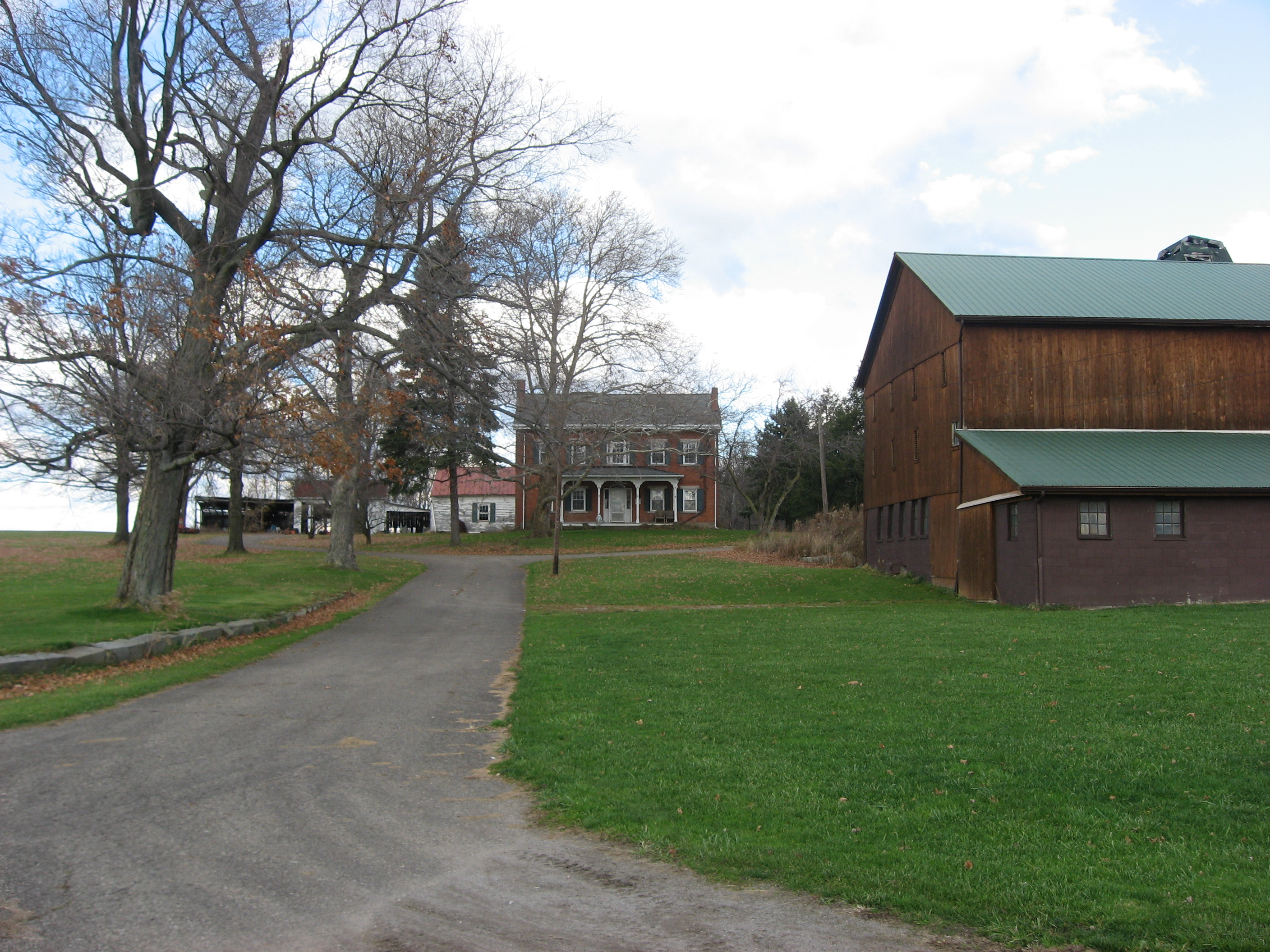
- Buildings on the McClelland Farm

- Location within Pennsylvania Location within the United States
- Location: McClelland Road, North Beaver Township, Pennsylvania
- Nearest city: Bessemer
- Coordinates: 40°59′37″N 80°27′3″W
- Area: 2.3 acres (0.93 ha)
- Built: 1840
- Architectural style: Federal, Vernacular Federal
- NRHP reference No.: 89000359
- Added to NRHP: May 17, 1989

The McClelland Homestead is a historic farm in western Lawrence County, Pennsylvania, United States. Located along McClelland Road northeast of Bessemer, the farm complex includes buildings constructed in the middle of the 19th century. It has been designated a historic site because of its well-preserved architecture.

== McClelland family ==
William McClelland purchased property in what today is part of North Beaver Township in 1807 and operated it successfully; by the time that he sold it to his son Joseph in 1848, he had become a prosperous farmer. According to an 1872 map, the farm was composed of lands on the northern side of what is today McClelland Road. Joseph gave up ownership of the property in 1895, but the farm remained in the McClelland family at least into the 1980s. In 1989, the farm consisted of approximately 89 acres (36 ha).

== Buildings ==
Eight buildings and structures compose the McClelland Farm complex: the barn, a silo, the farmhouse, a small square shed, a machinery shed, a chicken coop, a hog house, and a corn crib. Three of these buildings — the house, the barn, and the machinery shed — contribute to the historic nature of the farm, while the remaining structures are unoriginal or have been heavily modified.

=== Farmhouse ===
Joseph McClelland's house is the most significant building on the farm. A two-story farmhouse erected in the 1840s, it is primarily a Federal structure; its foundation is stone, the walls are brick, topped with corbelling and rising to gables, and the roof is covered with slates. Its leading architectural feature is a grand Palladian window above the main entrance; such a window is unknown in other period houses in Lawrence County.

During the late 1870s, the house was extensively modified: Italianate porches were added in 1879 to bring the house up to current architectural fashions, while the rooms of the interior were completely rebuilt. The completion of that process resulted in an eight-room house, with a central hallway separating the four rooms on each floor. Among the original elements that survived this rebuilding were stone lintels and a wooden staircase in the southern part of the house. In general, the southern portion of the house was less significantly affected by the process than was the northern portion, which was further modified by the addition of rooms to the northern facade. Since the 1870s, modifications have included the expansion of the garage that was included in the 1879 addition, in-depth cleaning and repainting of the walls in the 1960s, the partition of rooms to create an apartment in the rear, and the removal of original stoves and three of the four original chimneys in 1966.

Although two other farmhouses from the first half of the 19th century are extant in North Beaver Township, the McClelland farmhouse is unique: the other farmhouses are Greek Revival structures, and unlike the McClelland property, they now lack their original outbuildings. A similar situation exists in northern Beaver County, approximately 15 miles (24 km) away, where the James Beach Clow House is the only farmhouse in its township to have survived without extensive modifications.

=== Barn ===
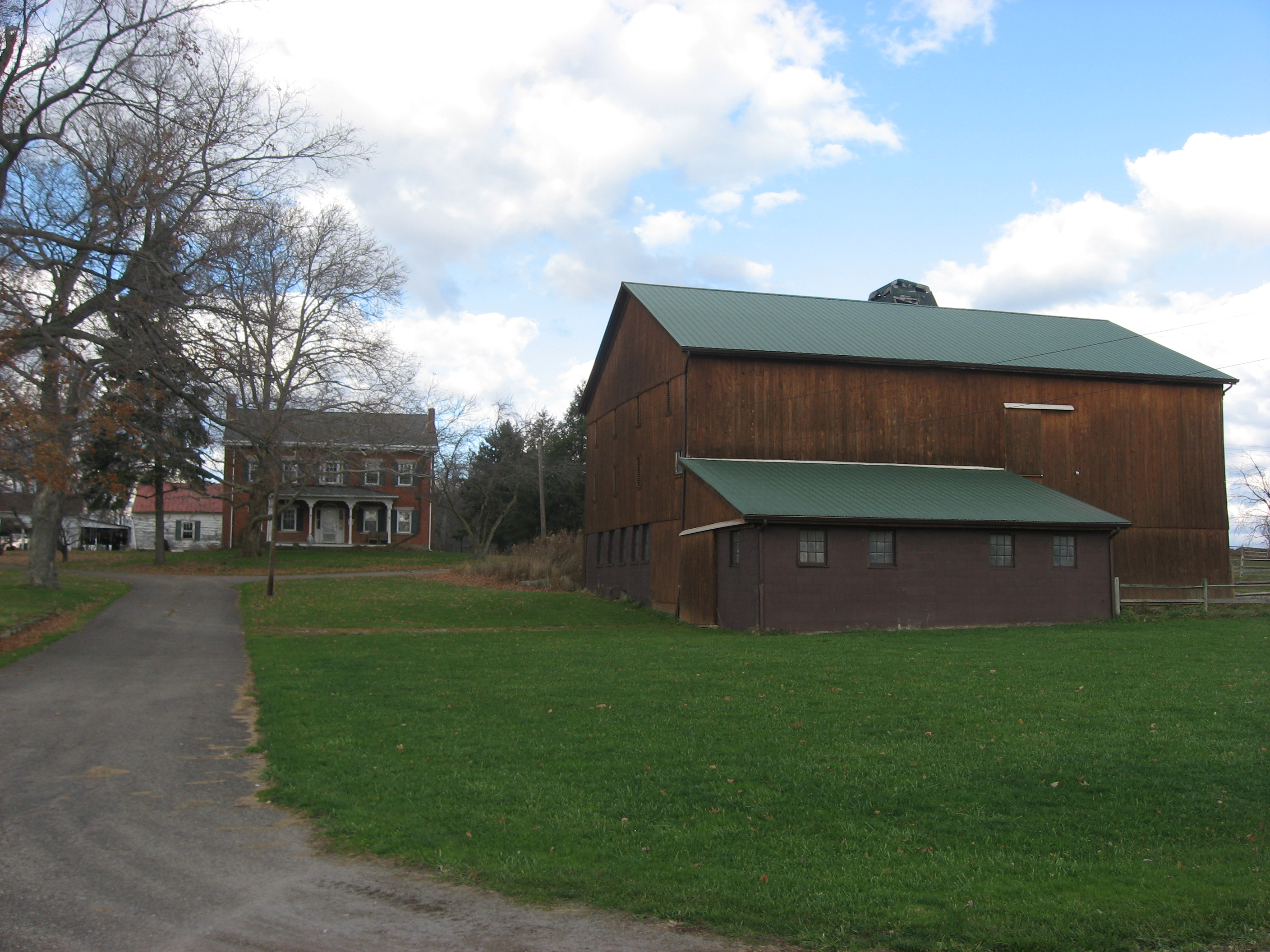
Southern and western sides of the barn

The barn is a two-story frame structure built to shelter both plant products and livestock. On the ground floor, stalls are in place to hold more than thirty cattle, while the second floor consists primarily of a hayloft. Built circa 1850, the barn is the most southerly building on the farm; its location arises from the presence of a small spring, which its builder intended for it to cover. Oak timbers are used to construct a post and lintel frame; the remarkably well-preserved original construction is its most historically significant aspect. Outside, the walls are covered by the original timbered siding, and the roof is covered with shingles of asbestos. Two related and significant modifications have been made to the barn: part of the western end was removed after was badly damaged in a storm, and a concrete block milkhouse was built in its place in the 1960s.

=== Machinery shed ===
Built circa 1850 to the north of the farmhouse, the machinery shed once housed a cider press. It is a two-story structure that has been modified by the addition of two wings, built in 1938 primarily for the purposes of sheltering farm implements. The walls are now covered with aluminum siding, but the building is still supported by the mortise and tenon joints of the original oak frame.

== Recognition ==
In 1989, the McClelland Homestead was listed on the National Register of Historic Places for its architectural significance. Crucial to this designation were elements such as the Palladian window of the house and the original framing of the outbuildings; although all three buildings have been modified since their construction, they remain in a condition close to that of their early years and have thus been seen as worthy of historic preservation.
