= 1964 American Cyanamid explosion =

1964 explosion in Edinburg, Pennsylvania, U.S.

- Date: July 6, 1964; 62 years ago
- Location: American Cyanamid Chemical Plant, Edinburg; 41°00′52″N 80°26′12″W
- Outcome: 5 killed

On July 6, 1964, a large explosion engulfed the American Cyanamid chemical plant in Edinburg, Pennsylvania. 5 workers were killed, and the blast damaged dozens of buildings in the immediate area. The explosion resulted from the ignition of chemical materials within the facility. Emergency response efforts were complicated by the presence of toxic substances, raising concerns about potential health and environmental impacts on surrounding communities.

== Background ==
The site of the 1964 explosion was part of a longstanding chemical and explosives manufacturing complex near Edinburg in Lawrence County, Pennsylvania. The origins of the facility date back to the early 20th century, when explosives worker Job Burton founded the Burton Powder Company in 1903 to manufacture dynamite for mining and construction. After a series of several accidental explosions, the company was acquired by American Cyanamid, a major U.S. chemical conglomerate that produced fertilizers, chemicals, pharmaceuticals, and, at the Edinburg site, nitroglycerin-based explosives. Under Cyanamid’s ownership, the plant expanded to encompass hundreds of acres with numerous mixing houses, laboratories, and its own internal rail system.

== Events ==
On July 6, 1964, a sudden ignition triggered a powerful explosion within one of the facility's operational areas, causing extensive damage to buildings and equipment. Four more explosions soon followed and sent debris flying in all directions and started numerous fires. Five buildings were leveled and a company locomotive was completely destroyed. The blasts were felt all throughout Lawrence County and windows were broken in distant locales as far as Mount Jackson. Emergency services responded to the scene shortly after the explosion, but firefighting and containment efforts were complicated by the presence of hazardous and toxic substances, requiring specialized handling to prevent further risk. Nearby areas were monitored for potential chemical exposure, though no widespread civilian harm was documented, and five square miles of Union Township reportedly were evacuated by police and civil defense officials. A total of five workers were later found dead.

== Investigation ==
Operations at the plant were temporarily suspended following the incident while damage was assessed and safety conditions were reviewed. Investigations focused on the handling and storage of chemical materials, as well as existing safety procedures at the facility. The plant was shut down in 1971 and the property was eventually purchased by the Bruce & Merrilees Electric Company in August 1972 before being transferred to the control of the New Castle Development Corporation.
