= Ohio State Route 630 =

State highway in Mahoning County, Ohio, US

State Route 630

Route information
- Maintained by ODOT
- Length: 2.56 mi (4.12 km)
- Existed: 1937–present

Major junctions
- West end: SR 170 in New Middletown
- East end: PA 317 near New Middletown

Location
- Country: United States
- State: Ohio
- Counties: Mahoning

Highway system
- Ohio State Highway System; Interstate; US; State; Scenic
← SR 629	→ SR 631

State Route 630 (SR 630) is a 2.56-mile-long (4.12 km) east–west state highway in the northeastern quadrant of the U.S. state of Ohio. The western terminus of SR 630 is at a signalized intersection with SR 170 in the northern end of the village of New Middletown. Its eastern terminus is at the Pennsylvania state line nearly two miles (3.2 km) east of New Middletown. Upon crossing the border, SR 630 becomes Pennsylvania Route 317 (PA 317), which continues east to Bessemer.

SR 630 was created in the late 1930s. The two–lane highway provides a connection between PA 317 and the Ohio state highway system.

== Route description ==
SR 630 runs entirely within the southeastern quadrant of Mahoning County. It commences from the signalized intersection of SR 170 and Calla Road in the northwestern corner of New Middletown. Heading east from there, SR 630 passes amidst a number of homes within the village prior to where it meets Struthers Road. Passing into rural Springfield Township, SR 630 passes amidst a blend of woods and farmland, with a number of homes lining the highway. It goes on to intersect Rapp Road, Felger Street and Metz Road. SR 630 soon meets State Line Road and the Pennsylvania state line, where the route comes to an end and turns into PA 317, which continues east in the direction of Bessemer.

SR 630 is not including within the National Highway System.

== History ==
The SR 630 designation was first applied in 1937. It has maintained the same routing in the vicinity of New Middletown since its inception. The only change related to SR 630 through its history is that the highway that it met at its western terminus when first designated was not known as SR 170, but rather its predecessor, SR 90. SR 630 has been paved for the duration of its existence.

== Major intersections ==
The entire route is in Mahoning County.

Location	mi	km	Destinations	Notes
New Middletown	0.00	0.00	SR 170 / Calla Road – Youngstown, New Middletown	
Springfield Township	2.56	4.12	PA 317 east / Stateline Road	Pennsylvania state line
1.000 mi = 1.609 km; 1.000 km = 0.621 mi
