= Pennsylvania Route 388 =

State highway in Lawrence County, Pennsylvania, US

Pennsylvania Route 388

Route information
- Maintained by PennDOT
- Length: 8.370 mi (13.470 km)
- Existed: 1928–present

Major junctions
- South end: PA 65 in Energy
- US 422 in Shenango Township
- North end: PA 168 in East Brook

Location
- Country: United States
- State: Pennsylvania
- Counties: Lawrence

Highway system
- Pennsylvania State Route System; Interstate; US; State; Scenic; Legislative
← PA 387	→ PA 390

Pennsylvania Route 388 (PA 388) is a north–south state highway in Lawrence County, Pennsylvania, United States, located in Western Pennsylvania. It travels 8.4 miles (13.5 km) between PA 168 in East Brook and PA 65 in Energy.

== Route description ==
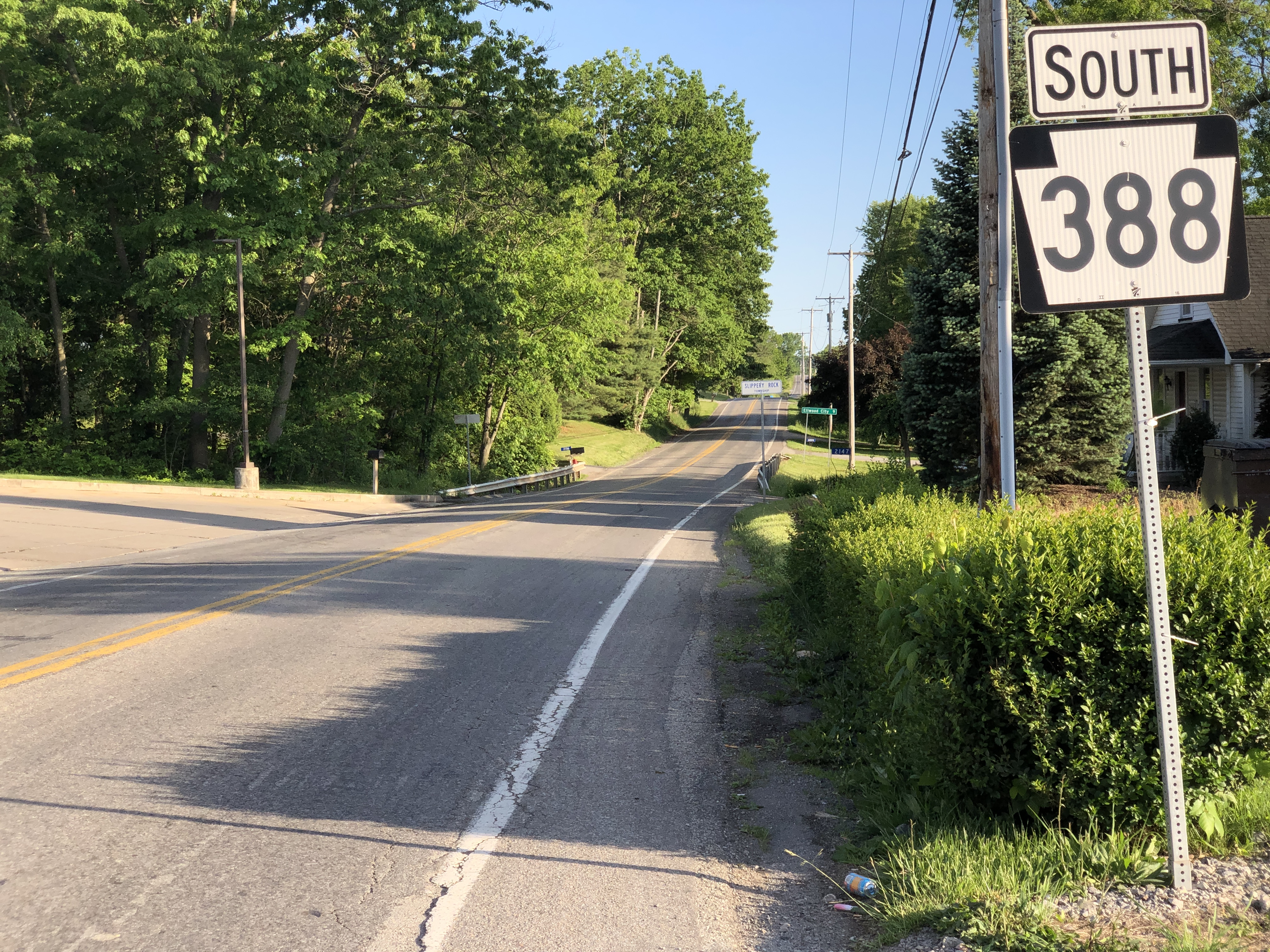
PA 388 southbound past US 422 in Slippery Rock Township

PA 388 begins at an intersection with PA 65 in the community of Energy in Shenango Township, heading north on a two-lane undivided road. The route passes through rural areas of homes, crossing into Slippery Rock Township. The road continues past areas of farms and woods with some rural residences, becoming the border between Shenango Township to the west and Slippery Rock Township to the east. PA 388 bends slightly to the east to fully enter Slippery Rock Township, crossing into Shenango Township again as it comes to an intersection with US 422. After this junction, the route passes through rural residential areas in the community of Wiegletown, becoming the border of Shenango Township and Slippery Rock Township again. The road passes through more areas of farmland and woodland with a few homes, bending west into Shenango Township prior to entering Hickory Township. In this area, PA 388 comes to a junction with PA 108. The route continues through more rural areas before coming to its northern terminus at PA 168.

== Major intersections ==
The entire route is in Lawrence County.

Location	mi	km	Destinations	Notes
Shenango Township	0.000	0.000	PA 65 (Ellwood Road)	Southern terminus
Shenango Township	3.115	5.013	US 422 (New Butler Road/Benjamin Franklin Highway) – New Castle, Butler	
Hickory Township	5.797	9.329	PA 108 (Harlansburg Road) – Slippery Rock, New Castle	
Hickory Township	8.370	13.470	PA 168 (Eastbrook Volant Road)	Northern terminus
1.000 mi = 1.609 km; 1.000 km = 0.621 mi
