= North Beaver Township, Pennsylvania =

Township in Pennsylvania, US

Coordinates: 40°57′00″N 80°30′29″W

North Beaver Township
- Township
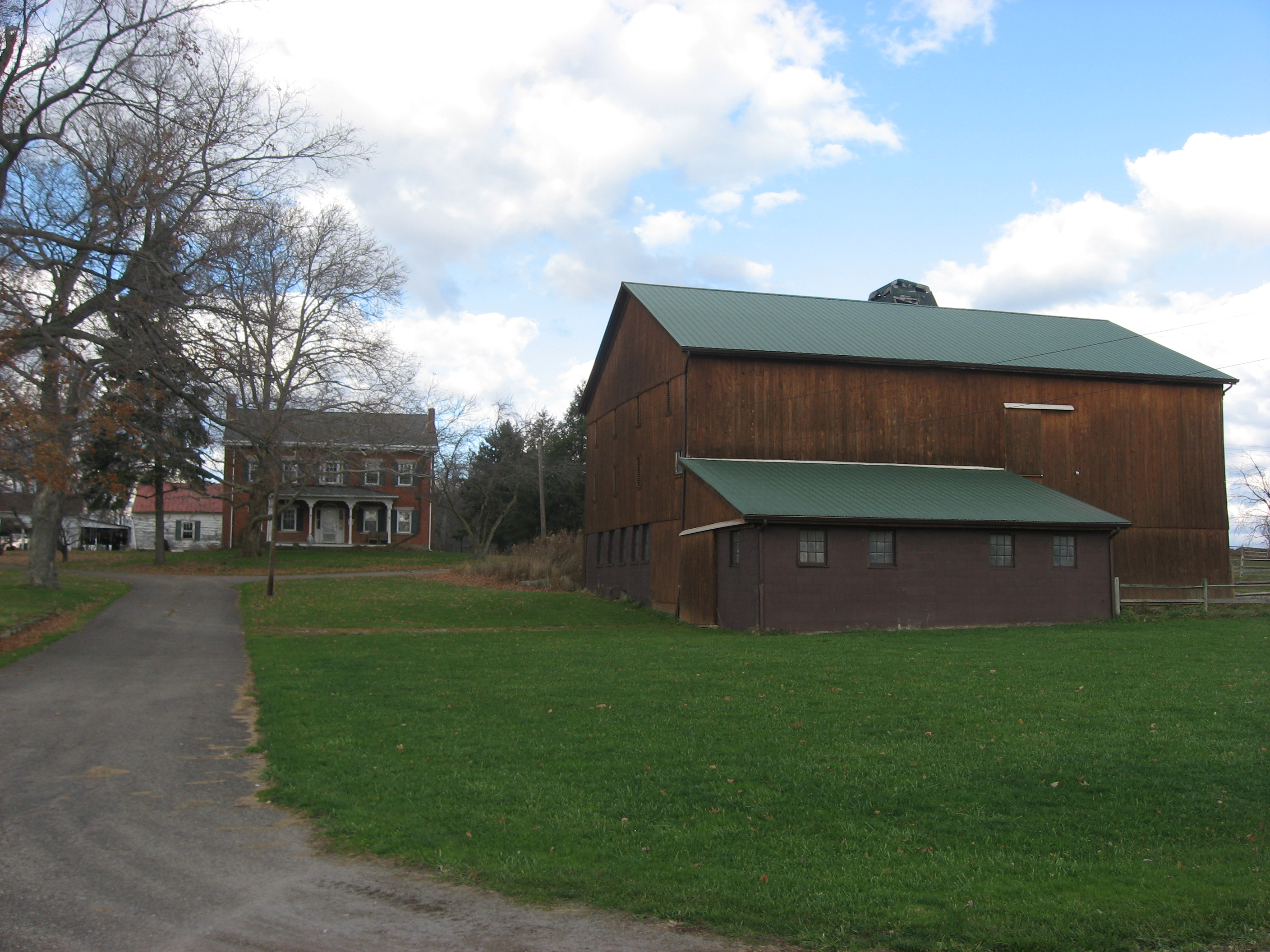
- McClelland Homestead; National Register of Historic Places

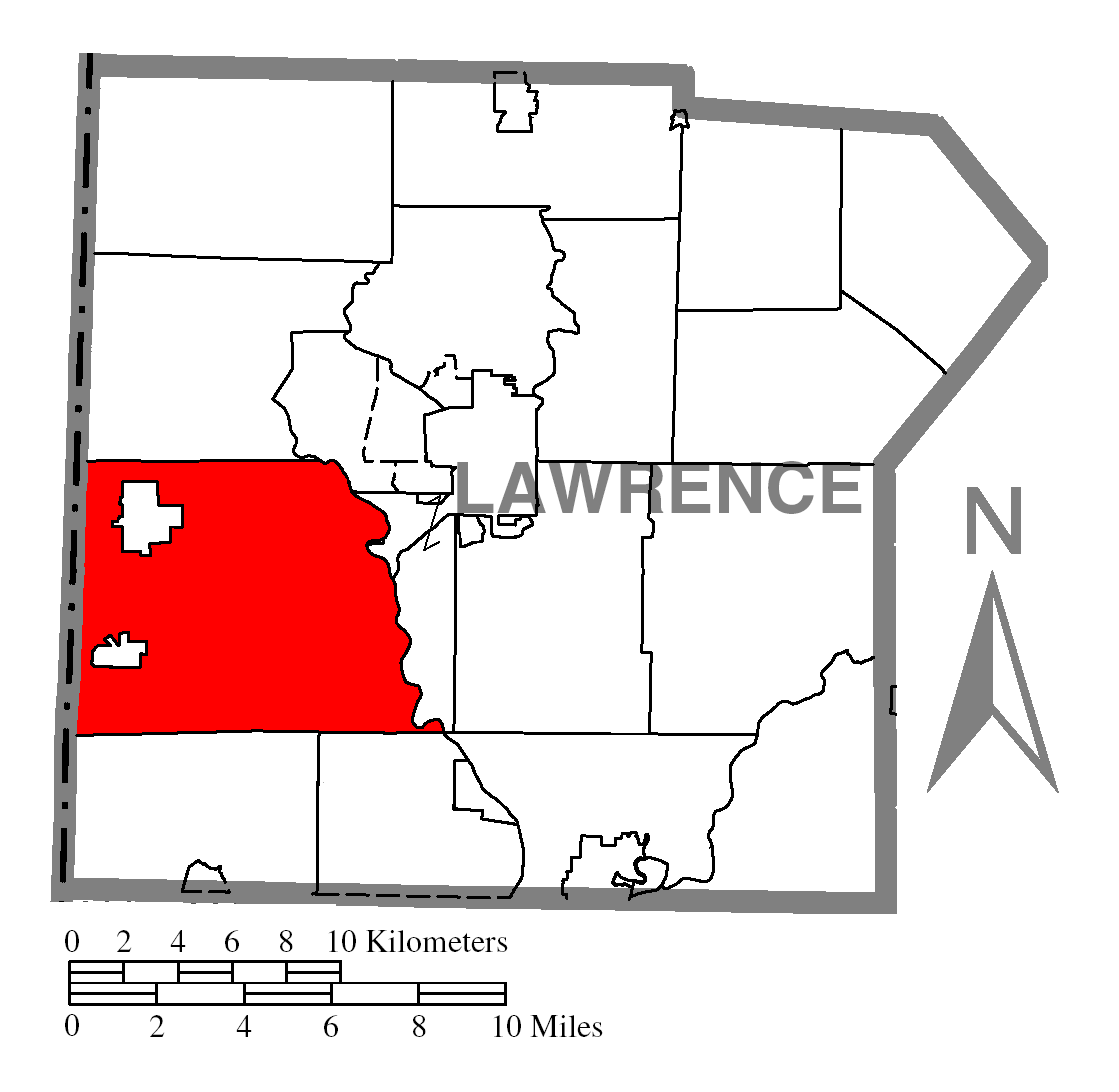
- Location of North Beaver Township in Lawrence County

- Location of Lawrence County in Pennsylvania
- Country: United States
- State: Pennsylvania
- County: Lawrence
- Established: 1799

Area
  - Total: 43.04 sq mi (111.48 km^{2})
  - Land: 42.36 sq mi (109.71 km^{2})
  - Water: 0.68 sq mi (1.77 km^{2})
- Highest elevation (north of McCauley Road): 1,271 ft (387 m)
- Lowest elevation (Beaver River): 760 ft (230 m)

Population (2020)
  - Total: 3,958
  - Estimate (2022): 3,939
  - Density: 93.9/sq mi (36.27/km^{2})
- Time zone: UTC-4 (EST)
  - Summer (DST): UTC-5 (EDT)
- Area code: 724
- FIPS code: 42-073-54768
- Website: www.northbeavertwp.org

Historical population
Census	Pop.	Note	%±
2000	4,022		—
2010	4,121		2.5%
2020	3,959		−3.9%
2022 (est.)	3,939		−0.5%
U.S. Decennial Census

North Beaver Township is a township in Lawrence County, Pennsylvania, United States. The population was 3,959 at the 2020 census, a decline from the figure of 4,121 tabulated in 2010.

The Slovene National Benefit Society applied to have their 500-acre (200 ha) recreation center in North Beaver Township designated as a separate municipality in 1977. The S.N.P.J. borough was created so that the society could, among other things, get their own liquor license, for North Beaver Township restricts the sale of alcohol.

== History ==
North Beaver Township was originally incorporated in 1799 as one of the original townships of Beaver County. In 1804, the township was split at the Beaver River, with the western bank becoming Shenango Township, and both of which eventually joined the newly created Lawrence County in 1849.

McClelland Homestead was listed on the National Register of Historic Places in 1989.

== Geography ==
According to the United States Census Bureau, the township has a total area of 43.2 square miles (112.0 km^{2}), of which 43.1 square miles (111.5 km^{2}) is land and 0.2 square miles (0.5 km^{2}), or 0.44%, is water.

The western border of the township is the Ohio state line.

The township surrounds the boroughs of Bessemer and S.N.P.J. and includes the unincorporated communities of Mount Jackson, Sunnyside, Willow Grove, Jackson Knolls Gardens, Derringer Corners, and Moravia.

== Demographics ==
As of the census of 2000, there were 4,022 people, 1,502 households, and 1,180 families residing in the township. The population density was 93.4 inhabitants per square mile (36.1/km^{2}). There were 1,580 housing units at an average density of 36.7 per square mile (14.2/km^{2}). The racial makeup of the township was 98.66% White, 0.05% African American, 0.02% Native American, 0.37% Asian, 0.12% from other races, and 0.77% from two or more races. Hispanic or Latino of any race were 0.50% of the population.

There were 1,502 households, out of which 33.6% had children under the age of 18 living with them, 66.6% were married couples living together, 8.4% had a female householder with no husband present, and 21.4% were non-families. 18.8% of all households were made up of individuals, and 8.9% had someone living alone who was 65 years of age or older. The average household size was 2.68 and the average family size was 3.06.

In the township the population was spread out, with 24.8% under the age of 18, 6.8% from 18 to 24, 27.6% from 25 to 44, 26.6% from 45 to 64, and 14.2% who were 65 years of age or older. The median age was 40 years. For every 100 females, there were 99.9 males. For every 100 females age 18 and over, there were 96.2 males.

The median income for a household in the township was $41,413, and the median income for a family was $50,000. Males had a median income of $33,152 versus $21,906 for females. The per capita income for the township was $18,869. About 6.7% of families and 8.3% of the population were below the poverty line, including 11.6% of those under age 18 and 5.0% of those age 65 or over.

== Education ==
The Mohawk Area School District serves the township.

== Transportation ==
Interstate 376 travels north–south through eastern North Beaver Township.

=== Major roads and highways ===
- I-76 / Penna Turnpike
- I-376
- PA 18
- PA 108
- PA 168
- PA 317
- PA 551
