= Pennsylvania Route 551 =

State highway in Pennsylvania, US

Pennsylvania Route 551

Route information
- Maintained by PennDOT and Pulaski Township
- Length: 33.638 mi (54.135 km)

Major junctions
- South end: PA 18 in Beaver Falls
- I-376 Toll in Big Beaver; PA 168 in Darlington; PA 351 in Enon Valley; PA 108 in North Beaver Township; PA 317 in North Beaver Township; US 224 in Mahoning Township; US 422 in Mahoning Township; PA 208 in Pulaski Township
- North end: PA 18 near West Middlesex

Location
- Country: United States
- State: Pennsylvania
- Counties: Beaver, Lawrence, Mercer

Highway system
- Pennsylvania State Route System; Interstate; US; State; Scenic; Legislative
← PA 550	→ PA 552

Pennsylvania Route 551 (PA 551) is a 34-mile-long (55 km) state highway located in Beaver, Lawrence, and Mercer counties in Pennsylvania. The southern terminus is at PA 18 in Beaver Falls. The northern terminus is at PA 18 near West Middlesex.

Though officially a spur route of PA 51, PA 551 is more suited as a spur route of PA 18, due to PA 551 ending at PA 18 at both ends without intersecting with PA 51 at all. (PA 51 and PA 551 come within a mile of each other near Darlington, Pennsylvania at their closest point.) While PA 18 passes through larger cities, PA 551 goes through more rural areas.

== Route description ==
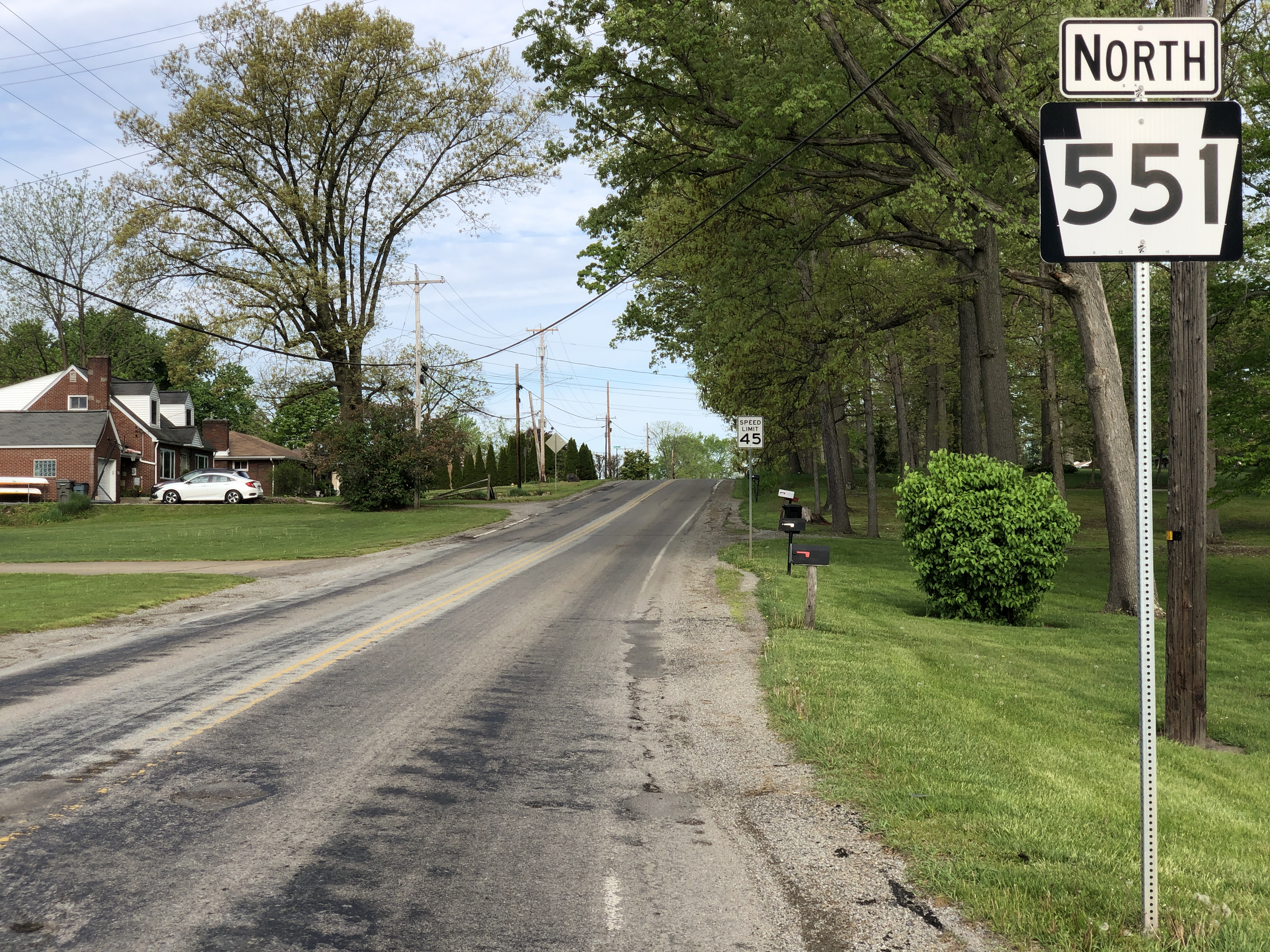
PA 551 northbound in Big Beaver

PA 551 begins at an intersection with PA 18 in the city of Beaver Falls in Beaver County, heading west on two-lane undivided 49th Street Extended. The road passes between commercial areas to the north and homes to the south, crossing under Norfolk Southern's Fort Wayne Line and heading into the borough of West Mayfield, becoming Wallace Run Road. The route heads into wooded areas with some homes, crossing Wallace Run into the borough of Big Beaver. PA 551 continues northwest along the northern bank of Wallace Run, coming to an interchange with I-376 that has a toll plaza on the ramps to and from the northbound direction of I-376. The road heads into a mix of farmland and woodland with some residences, curving more to the west. The route heads southwest and crosses into Chippewa Township, turning northwest and briefly passing through Big Beaver again prior to entering Darlington Township. PA 551 curves west and heads into South Beaver Township, where it turns north onto Old Darlington Road and comes to an intersection with PA 168. Here, PA 168 turns north to form a concurrency with the route, crossing the North Fork Little Beaver Creek into Darlington Township. The road heads into the borough of Darlington and becomes Market Street as it heads through residential areas, with PA 168 splitting to the east in a commercial area. PA 551 continues north past more homes, turning east onto 5th Street as it forms the border between Darlington to the south and Darlington Township to the north. The route turns north onto Hollow Road and fully enters Darlington Township, heading into a mix of farms and woods with some residences. The road curves to the northwest as it heads through more rural areas.

PA 551 enters the borough of Enon Valley in Lawrence County and becomes Main Street, heading into residential areas and crossing Norfolk Southern's Fort Wayne Line. The route intersects PA 351 and becomes concurrent with that route, soon heading north onto State Street as it passes more homes. The road heads into Little Beaver Township and becomes unnamed, heading through more areas of farms, woods, and residences as it passes through Old Enon. PA 351 splits to the northwest and PA 551 continues north on Enon Road, crossing the North Fork Little Beaver Creek again and continuing through more farmland and woodland with a few homes. The road heads into open agricultural areas with occasional residences, passing over I-76 (Pennsylvania Turnpike). The route crosses into North Beaver Township and runs through Newburg, continuing through more rural areas. PA 551 heads through more farmland with some woods and homes as it comes to a junction with PA 108. At this point, PA 108 turns north to form a concurrency with PA 551, with the name changing to Mt. Jackson Road. The road curves northeast through more agricultural areas with some woodland and residences, turning more to the east into wooded areas with some homes. In the community of Mount Jackson, PA 551 splits from PA 108 by heading north along with PA 317 on Mohawk School Road. The road passes farms and homes before PA 551 splits from PA 317 by heading north on Edinburg Road.

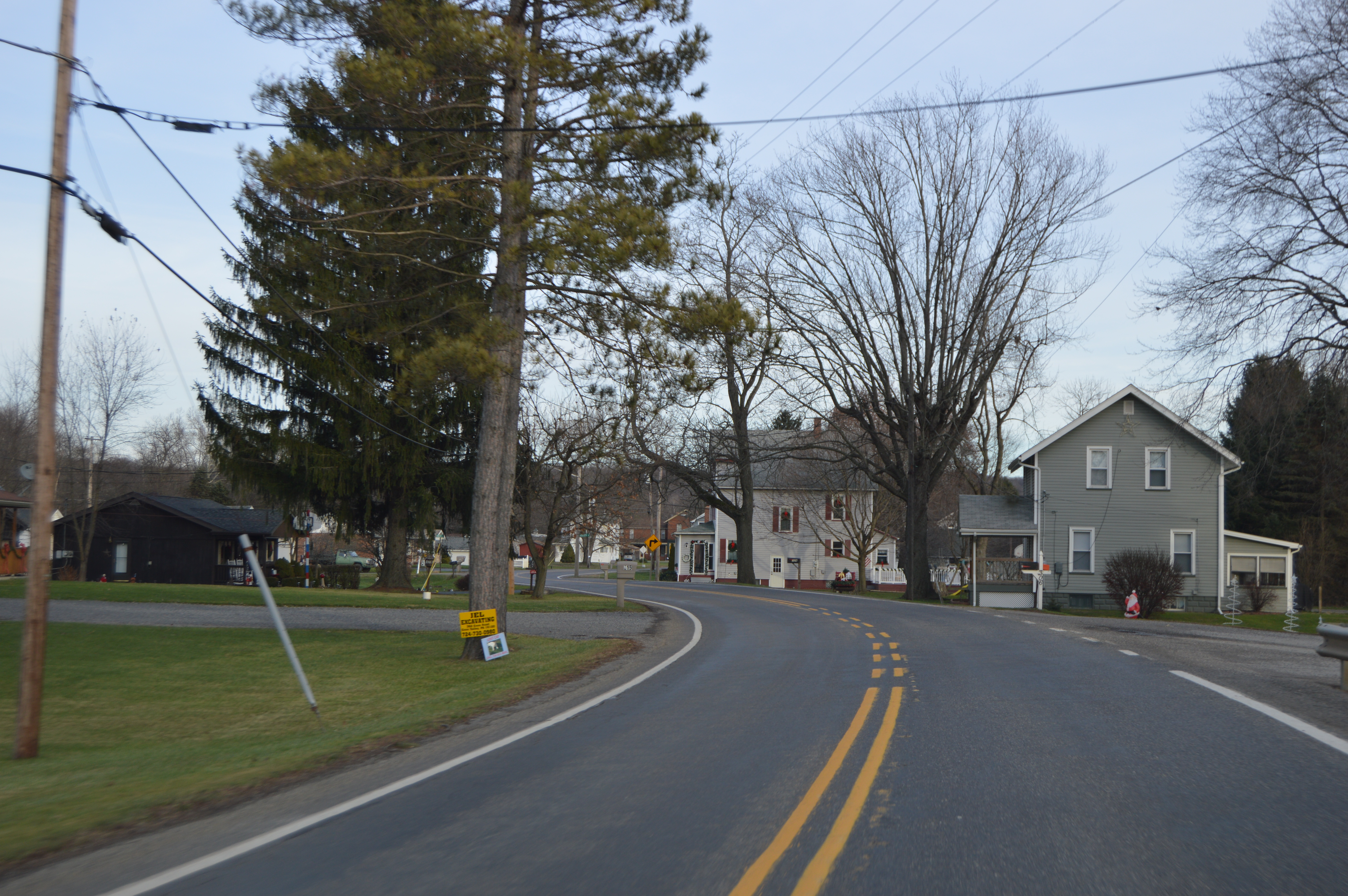
Entering Edinburg from the west

The route runs through farmland and woodland with some residences, crossing into Mahoning Township. PA 551 crosses Norfolk Southern's Youngstown Line and becomes Erie Street, heading into the residential community of Edinburg. Here, the route turns west onto Jackson Street and passes more homes before heading through farm fields and curving northwest. PA 551 comes to an intersection with US 224 and turns northeast to join that route on West State Street. The road heads through wooded areas and crosses the Mahoning River and CSX's New Castle Subdivision railroad line. PA 551 splits from US 224 by heading north on North Edinburg Road, continuing through wooded areas with some farmland and homes. The road crosses US 422 and continues through more rural areas, heading north-northeast and entering Pulaski Township. The route becomes an unnamed road and runs north through more farmland and woodland with some residences, curving northwest and north again. PA 551 comes to an intersection with PA 208 and turns northeast to join that route, heading through woodland to the west of the Shenango River. The two routes turn east to cross the river and head into the residential community of Pulaski. Here, PA 551 splits from PA 208 by turning northeast onto the Pulaski Township-maintained Mercer Street, curving north as it passes between industrial areas to the west and I-376 to the east.

PA 551 heads into Shenango Township in Mercer County where state maintenance resumes and becomes Pulaski Road, heading north-northwest through wooded areas with some industrial buildings, homes, and fields. The route continues through a mix of agricultural areas and woodland, curving north as it comes to its northern terminus at another intersection with PA 18.

== Major intersections ==
County	Location	mi	km	Destinations	Notes
Beaver	Beaver Falls	0.000	0.000	PA 18 (4th Avenue) – Koppel, Beaver Falls	Southern terminus
Beaver	Big Beaver	1.590– 1.701	2.559– 2.737	I-376 Toll (Beaver Valley Expressway) to I-76 / Penna Turnpike – Pittsburgh, New Castle	I-376 exit 29; E-ZPass or toll-by-plate
Beaver	South Beaver Township	5.161	8.306	PA 168 south (Salem Church Road) to PA 51	South end of PA 168 overlap
Beaver	Darlington	5.478	8.816	PA 168 north (2nd Street)	North end of PA 168 overlap
Lawrence	Enon Valley	9.533	15.342	PA 351 east (Vine Street)	South end of PA 351 overlap
Lawrence	Little Beaver Township	10.429	16.784	PA 351 west – Petersburg	North end of PA 351 overlap
Lawrence	North Beaver Township	16.036	25.807	PA 108 west (Mt. Jackson Road)	South end of PA 108 overlap
Lawrence	North Beaver Township	18.510	29.789	PA 108 east (Mt. Jackson Road) / PA 317 begins / Mt. Air Road (SR 3009) – New Castle	North end of PA 108 overlap, south end of PA 317 overlap
Lawrence	North Beaver Township	18.732	30.146	PA 317 west (Mohawk School Road) – Bessemer	North end of PA 317 overlap
Lawrence	Mahoning Township	22.521	36.244	US 224 west (West State Street) – Poland	South end of US 224 overlap
Lawrence	Mahoning Township	22.914	36.877	US 224 east (West State Street) / Robinson Street – New Castle	North end of US 224 overlap
Lawrence	Mahoning Township	25.246	40.629	US 422 (Benjamin Franklin Highway) – Youngstown, New Castle	
Lawrence	Pulaski Township	29.221	47.027	PA 208 west	South end of PA 208 overlap
Lawrence	Pulaski Township	29.976	48.242	PA 208 east	North end of PA 208 overlap
Mercer	Shenango Township	33.638	54.135	PA 18 (New Castle Road) – West Middlesex	Northern terminus
1.000 mi = 1.609 km; 1.000 km = 0.621 mi: Concurrency terminus; Electronic toll collection

== PA 551 Alternate ==
Pennsylvania Route 551 Alternate
- Location: Enon Valley–Mount Jackson
- Length: 3.0 mi (4.8 km)
- Existed: 1940–1964

Pennsylvania Route 551 Alternate (PA 551 Alt.) was a 3-mile alternate bypass off of PA 551 in Lawrence County. Beginning at the parent route in Enon Valley, PA 551 Alt. ran northbound along Fullerton and Mount Air Roads and rejoined its parent route (and its concurrency with PA 108) in Mount Jackson. The route existed from 1940 to 1964.
