= Pennsylvania Route 168 =

State highway in Pennsylvania, US

Pennsylvania Route 168

Route information
- Maintained by PennDOT
- Length: 55.3 mi (89.0 km)

Major junctions
- South end: PA 18 in Frankfort Springs
- US 30 near Hookstown; PA 68 in Midland; PA 51 near Darlington I-376 Toll near New Castle; US 422 near Mahoningtown; PA 108 in New Castle
- North end: PA 208 in Volant

Location
- Country: United States
- State: Pennsylvania
- Counties: Beaver, Lawrence

Highway system
- Pennsylvania State Route System; Interstate; US; State; Scenic; Legislative
← PA 167	→ PA 170

Pennsylvania Route 168 (PA 168) is a highway in Western Pennsylvania that runs for 55 miles (89 km) from PA 18 in Frankfort Springs to PA 208 in Volant. PA 168 intersects or runs concurrently with PA 18 at several points, including in New Castle.

== Route description ==
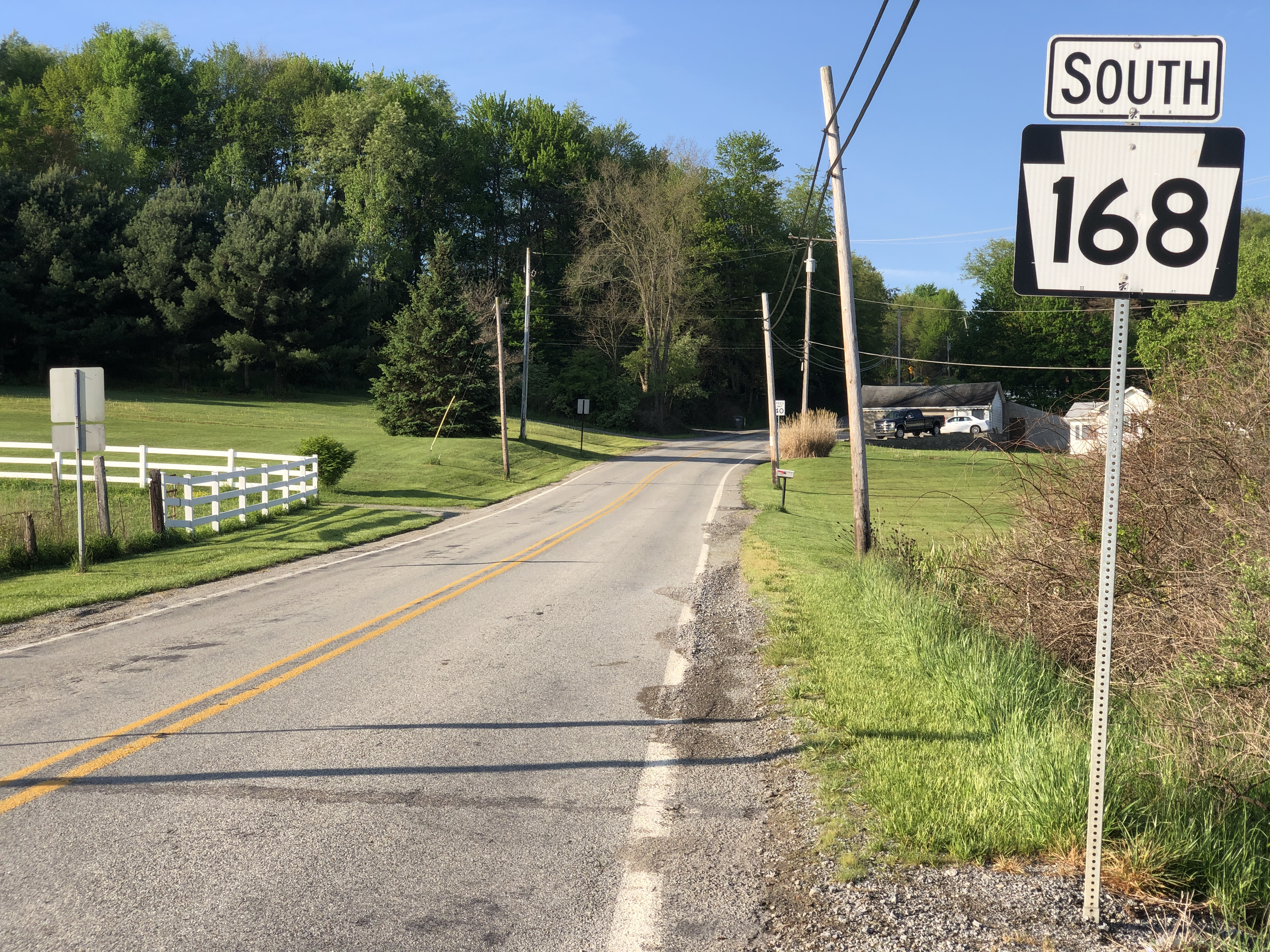
PA 168 southbound in South Beaver Township

=== Beaver County ===
PA 168 begins at an intersection with PA 18 in the borough of Frankfort Springs in Beaver County, heading north on a two-lane undivided road. The route heads into Hanover Township and continues north-northwest through wooded areas with some fields and homes. The road heads northwest as it forms the western border of Raccoon Creek State Park, turning more to the north. PA 168 passes through Kendall and heads past the state park, running through farmland and woodland with some residences. The road crosses into Greene Township and comes to an intersection with US 30. The route continues through more rural areas before entering the borough of Hookstown, where it becomes Main Street and passes homes. PA 168 turns east onto Pine Street and continues through more residential areas before crossing back into Greene Township. Here, the road runs through agricultural areas with some woods and homes as it heads northeast. The route heads into more wooded areas and crosses into the borough of Shippingport, becoming unnamed again. PA 168 turns northwest and passes to the east of the Beaver Valley Nuclear Generating Station before crossing the Ohio River on the Shippingport Bridge into the borough of Industry and passing over Norfolk Southern's Cleveland Line. At the end of the bridge, the route comes to an interchange with PA 68 and heads west to form a concurrency with that route on Midland Beaver Road. The road passes through industrial areas as it crosses into the borough of Midland and becomes Midland Avenue, heading northwest through commercial areas with some homes. The two routes head through the commercial downtown of Midland and heads into residential areas.

PA 168 splits from PA 68 by turning north onto Spring Lane Road, quickly curving to the east. The route makes a sharp turn northwest onto Fairview Road and heads into wooded areas, crossing into the borough of Ohioville. The road runs through more woodland with some housing developments, curving more to the north. PA 168 heads into a mix of farmland and woods with some homes, turning west-southwest onto Tuscarawas Road before a turn northeast onto Salem Church Road. The road heads north through more rural areas, continuing into South Beaver Township at the Lisbon Road intersection. The route runs through woodland with some fields and residences as an unnamed road, coming to an intersection with PA 251. PA 168 winds northeast through areas of farms and woods with some homes, becoming Salem Church Road again and reaching a junction with PA 51. Past this intersection, the road runs through wooded areas with some development, where it intersects PA 551. Here, PA 168 turns north to form a concurrency with the route, crossing the North Fork Little Beaver Creek into Darlington Township. The road heads into the borough of Darlington and becomes Market Street as it heads through residential areas, with PA 168 splitting to the east in a commercial area. The route heads east on 2nd Street, passing homes and crossing back into Darlington Township, where it curves northeast as Elmwood Boulevard. The road heads through farmland with some woods and residences, crossing the North Fork Little Beaver Creek again and heading into the borough of Big Beaver. PA 168 curves north and northeast through more rural areas, crossing Norfolk Southern's Fort Wayne Line into the borough of New Galilee and becoming Centennial Avenue. The road passes homes and curves north, coming to an intersection with PA 351. Here, PA 351 forms a concurrency with PA 168 before turning west onto Monroe Street. Past this, the route passes more residences before crossing back into Big Beaver and running through wooded areas.

=== Lawrence County ===
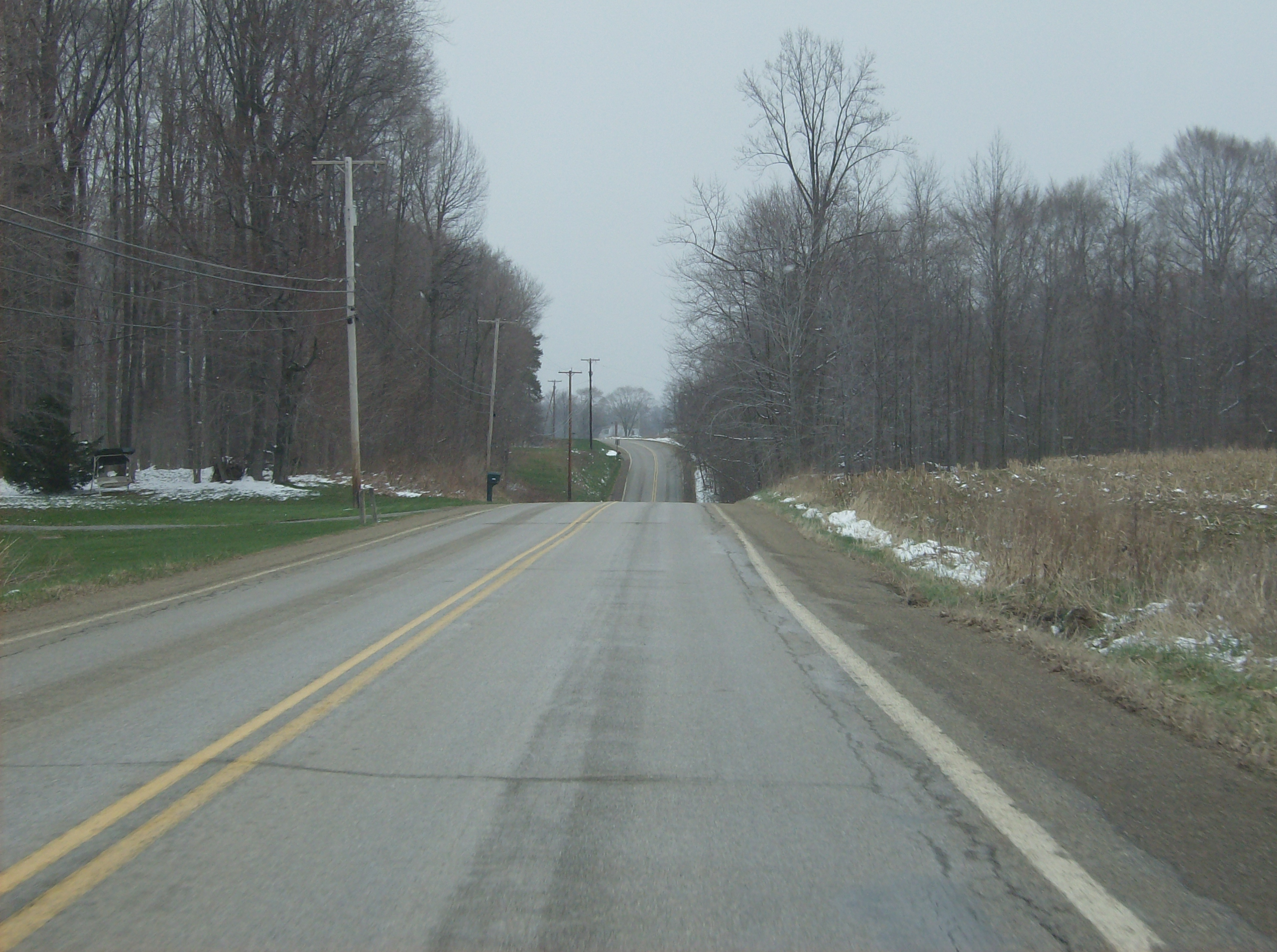
Typical scene along PA 168 in Lawrence County's Hickory Township.

PA 168 enters the borough of New Beaver in Lawrence County and becomes an unnamed road that heads through farmland and woodland with some homes, curving north-northeast and passing over I-76 (Pennsylvania Turnpike). The road heads north through more agricultural areas with some woods and residences, heading into North Beaver Township. Here, the route becomes Galilee Road and turns northeast, coming to an interchange with I-376, becoming a divided highway at this point. PA 168 becomes undivided again and heads east through wooded areas with some homes, reaching another intersection with PA 18. At this point, the route briefly turns south onto PA 18 before heading east on Wampum Road, crossing under Norfolk Southern's Youngstown Line. PA 168 curves southeast and turns northeast onto Galilee Road in Moravia, passing through fields and woods with some homes. The road crosses the Beaver River into Taylor Township and runs through woodland with some residences as it passes through East Moravia. The route turns east onto 3rd Street and passes over CSX's Pittsburgh Subdivision and P&W Subdivision railroad lines, running through woods. PA 168 turns north onto Center Avenue and passes homes in the community of West Pittsburg. The road heads into wooded areas with some residences and passes to the east of CSX's New Castle Yard. The route heads farther east from the railroad tracks and becomes West Pittsburg Road, widening into a four-lane divided highway as it comes to an interchange with the US 422 freeway. Past this, PA 168 turns northeast and becomes a two-lane undivided road again, running through more woods. The route heads into residential areas and turns north onto Moravia Street, crossing into the city of New Castle.

Here, the route continues north to an intersection with PA 18/PA 108. At this point, PA 18 and PA 108 turn north to follow PA 168 on Moravia Street, passing more industry with some businesses. The road crosses two New Castle Industrial Railroad lines and becomes South Jefferson Street. PA 108 and PA 168 split from PA 18 by turning northeast onto four-lane undivided South Croton Avenue, passing between the Neshannock Creek to the northwest and industrial areas to the southeast. The road crosses US 422 Business and continues to an intersection with the northern terminus of PA 65. PA 108/PA 168 becomes North Croton Avenue and runs between the creek to the northwest and woods and homes to the southeast. The two routes turn away from the creek and head northeast through residential areas with some businesses. The road curves more to the east, with PA 168 splitting from PA 108 by heading northeast on Eastbrook Road. The route crosses into Hickory Township and heads through areas of homes and farms with some woods. The road heads through more farmland and woodland with some residences, curving east and passing through East Brook. PA 168 turns northeast again and becomes Eastbrook Volant Road, intersecting the northern terminus of PA 388. Here, the road curves north and runs through more agricultural areas with some woods and homes. The route intersects PA 956 immediately before crossing into Wilmington Township. PA 168 continues north-northeast through rural areas in northern Lawrence County that are home to an Amish community, crossing into Washington Township, becoming unnamed and coming to its northern terminus at an intersection with PA 208 in the borough of Volant.

== History ==
=== Northern terminus ===
The segment of PA 168 north of the Ohio River originally started north then turned eastbound in Ohioville to its northern terminus at PA 68 in Beaver. In 1936, this was changed to continue north past Ohioville, allowing PA 168 to extend up through New Castle/Lawrence County and to its new northern terminus at PA 208 in Leesburg/Mercer County. In 1959, nearby PA 278 was decommissioned and replaced as a realignment of PA 208; thus, PA 168 and PA 208 ran concurrent for the former's last three miles. By 1970, PA 168's northern terminus was truncated to its current location at the PA 208 junction in Volant/Lawrence County.

=== Ohio River crossings ===
From Hookstown northbound, PA 168 originally ran up Main and Hill Streets through Georgetown to Smith's Ferry which was used to cross the Ohio River to join the route's northern segment on Smith's Ferry Road in Ohioville. Both segments leading to the Ohio were later relocated. In 1946, the entire Smith's Ferry Road segment from the north was moved east onto Fairview Road and continued southbound onto Midland Avenue, forming a concurrency with PA 68 through Midland to Cooks Ferry in Industry. This left an uneven "gap" with the southern route until 1951 when PA 168 was moved out of Georgetown and rerouted along Pine Street in Hookstown to Cooks Ferry in Shippingport. Cooks Ferry provided the necessary PA 168 connection across the river between Shippingport and Industry until it was replaced with the Shippingport Bridge in 1964.

== Major intersections ==
County	Location	mi	km	Destinations	Notes
Beaver	Frankfort Springs	0.0	0.0	PA 18 (Main Street)	Southern terminus of PA 168
Beaver	Greene Township	7.8	12.6	US 30 (Lincoln Highway) – Imperial, East Liverpool	
Beaver	Ohio River	13.0– 13.3	20.9– 21.4	Shippingport Bridge	
Beaver	Industry	13.3	21.4	PA 68 east (Midland-Beaver Road) – Beaver	Southern end of PA 68 concurrency
Beaver	Midland	15.2	24.5	PA 68 west (Midland Road)	Northern end of PA 68 concurrency
Beaver	South Beaver Township	24.8	39.9	PA 251 (Blackhawk Road)	
Beaver	South Beaver Township	28.6	46.0	PA 51 (Constitution Boulevard) to I-376 – Chippewa	
Beaver	South Beaver Township	29.4	47.3	PA 551 south (Wallace Run Road)	Southern end of PA 551 concurrency
Beaver	Darlington	29.7	47.8	PA 551 north (Market Street)	Northern end of PA 551 concurrency
Beaver	New Galilee	32.0	51.5	PA 351 east (Fairlane Boulevard) to I-376 Toll	Southern end of PA 351 concurrency
Beaver	New Galilee	32.1	51.7	PA 351 west (Monroe Street)	Northern end of PA 351 concurrency
Lawrence	North Beaver Township	38.3– 38.5	61.6– 62.0	I-376 Toll (Beaver Valley Expressway) – Pittsburgh, New Castle	Exit 20 (I-376); E-ZPass or toll-by-plate
Lawrence	North Beaver Township	38.9	62.6	PA 18 (Mahoning Avenue) – New Castle, Beaver Falls	
Lawrence	Taylor Township	42.7– 43.0	68.7– 69.2	US 422 (Benjamin Franklin Highway) – Butler, Youngstown	Interchange
Lawrence	New Castle	44.2	71.1	PA 18 south / PA 108 west (Mahoning Avenue)	Southern end of PA 18 / PA 108 concurrency
Lawrence	New Castle	45.1	72.6	PA 18 north (Moravia Street)	Northern end of PA 108 concurrency
Lawrence	New Castle	45.2	72.7	US 422 Bus. (Grove Street)	
Lawrence	New Castle	45.5	73.2	PA 65 south (East Washington Street)	Northern terminus of PA 65
Lawrence	New Castle	46.7	75.2	PA 108 east (Croton Avenue) – Slippery Rock	Northern end of PA 108 concurrency
Lawrence	Hickory Township	50.9	81.9	PA 388 south (State Road)	Northern terminus of PA 388
Lawrence	Hickory Township	52.9	85.1	PA 956 (Neshannock Falls Road) – New Wilmington, Harlansburg	
Lawrence	Volant	55.3	89.0	PA 208 (Main Street) – Volant, New Wilmington	Northern terminus of PA 168
1.000 mi = 1.609 km; 1.000 km = 0.621 mi: Concurrency terminus; Electronic toll collection
