= Hickory Township, Lawrence County, Pennsylvania =

Township in Pennsylvania, US

Hickory Township
- Township
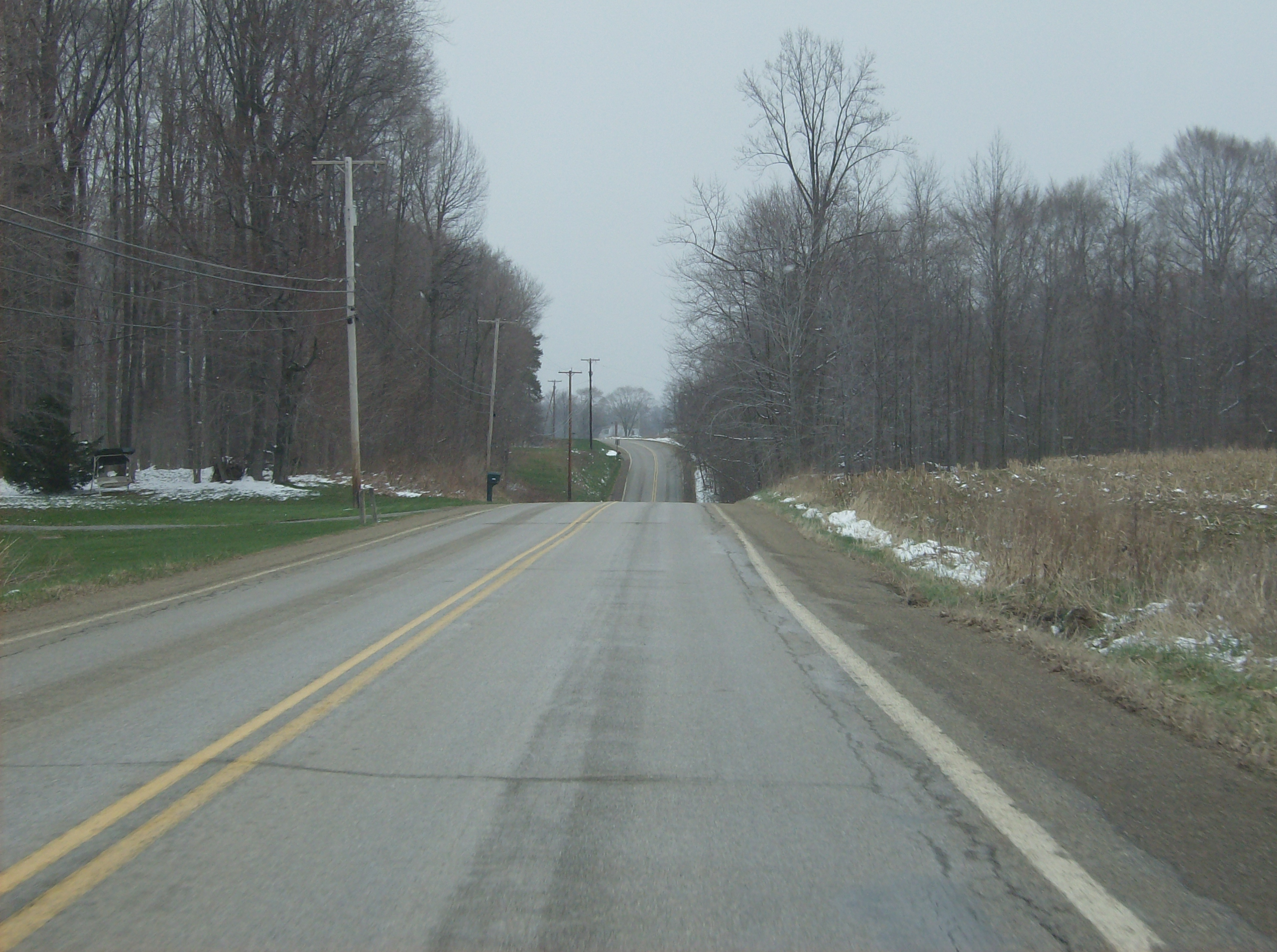
- Pennsylvania Route 168 in Hickory Township

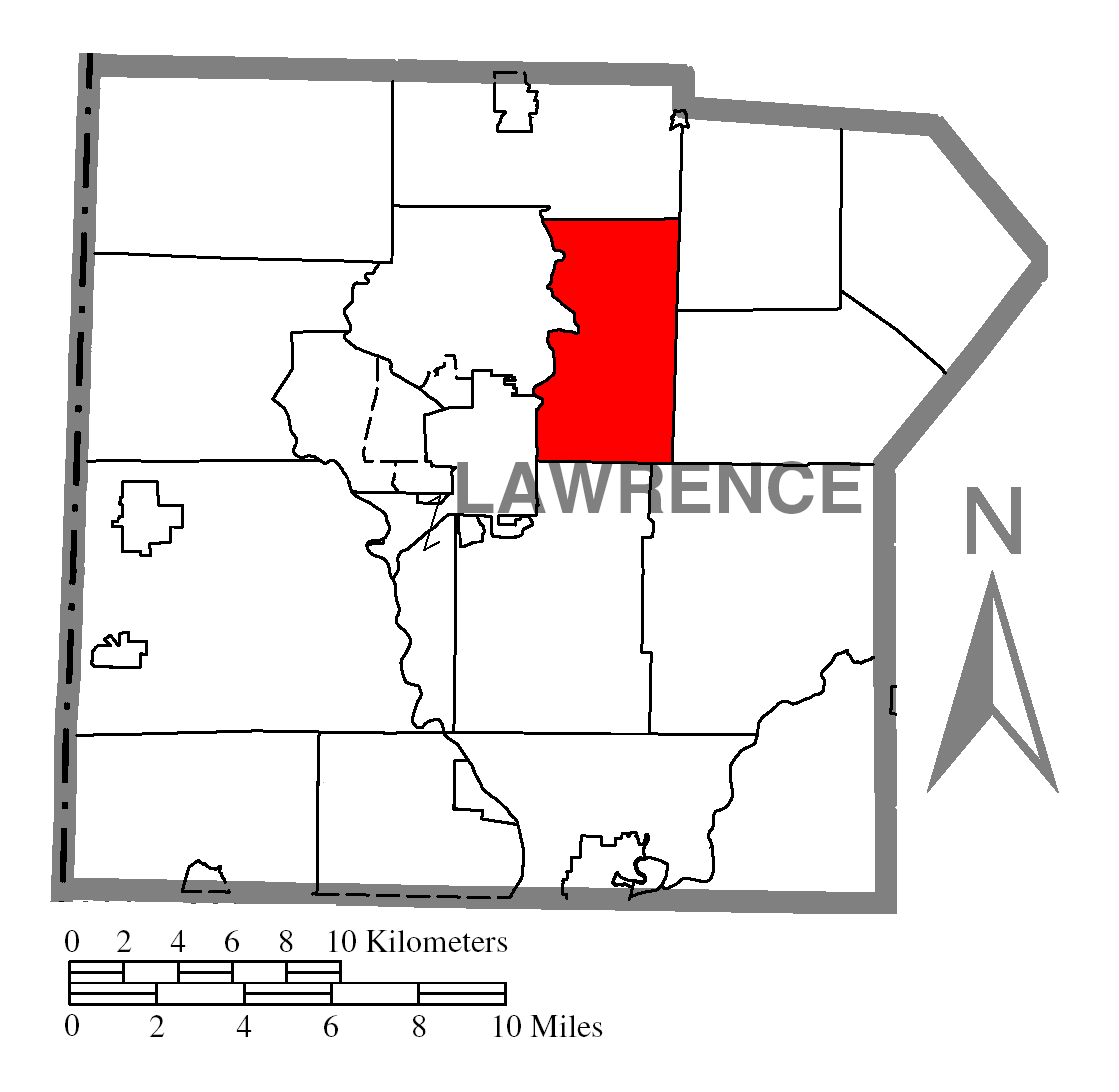
- Location of Hickory Township in Lawrence County

- Location of Lawrence County in Pennsylvania
- Coordinates: 41°03′00″N 80°16′59″W
- Country: United States
- State: Pennsylvania
- County: Lawrence
- Established: 1860

Area
  - Total: 15.93 sq mi (41.26 km^{2})
  - Land: 15.84 sq mi (41.03 km^{2})
  - Water: 0.089 sq mi (0.23 km^{2})
- Highest elevation (at Laurel School): 1,270 ft (390 m)
- Lowest elevation (Beaver River): 780 ft (240 m)

Population (2020)
  - Total: 2,320
  - Estimate (2022): 2,289
  - Density: 151.7/sq mi (58.57/km^{2})
- Time zone: UTC-4 (EST)
  - Summer (DST): UTC-5 (EDT)
- Area code: 724
- FIPS code: 42-073-34248
- Website: www.hickorytownship.com

Historical population
Census	Pop.	Note	%±
2000	2,356		—
2010	2,470		4.8%
2020	2,320		−6.1%
2022 (est.)	2,289		−1.3%

Hickory Township is a township in Lawrence County, Pennsylvania, United States. The population was 2,320 at the 2020 census, a decline from the figure of 2,470 tabulated in 2010.

== Geography ==
According to the United States Census Bureau, the township has a total area of 16.1 square miles (42 km^{2}), of which 16.1 square miles (42 km^{2}) is land and 0.04 square miles (0.10 km^{2}), or 0.12%, is water.

It contains the unincorporated communities of Eastbrook, Lakewood Park, and Briar Hill.

Hottenbaugh Run, which flows into Neshannock Creek and Neshannock Creek itself drains Hickory Township.

== Demographics ==
As of the 2000 census, there were 2,356 people, 925 households, and 690 families residing in the township. The population density was 146.5 inhabitants per square mile (56.6/km^{2}). There were 982 housing units at an average density of 61.1 per square mile (23.6/km^{2}). The racial makeup of the township was 98.34% White, 0.08% African American, 0.04% Native American, 0.30% Asian, 0.21% Pacific Islander, 0.17% from other races, and 0.85% from two or more races. Hispanic or Latino of any race were 0.42% of the population.

There were 925 households, out of which 32.1% had children under the age of 18 living with them, 62.7% were married couples living together, 8.8% had a female householder with no husband present, and 25.4% were non-families. 22.8% of all households were made up of individuals, and 10.5% had someone living alone who was 65 years of age or older. The average household size was 2.54 and the average family size was 3.00.

In the township, the population was spread out, with 23.6% under the age of 18, 7.6% from 18 to 24, 26.5% from 25 to 44, 26.6% from 45 to 64, and 15.6% who were 65 years of age or older. The median age was 41 years. For every 100 females, there were 97.8 males. For every 100 females age 18 and over, there were 92.7 males.

The median income for a household in the township was $41,389, and the median income for a family was $47,939. Males had a median income of $33,413 versus $21,038 for females. The per capita income for the township was $17,055. About 2.9% of families and 6.5% of the population were below the poverty line, including 7.7% of those under age 18 and 11.3% of those age 65 or over.

== Education ==
The Laurel School District serves the township.

== Transportation ==
=== Major roads and highways ===
- PA 108
- PA 168
- PA 388
- PA 956
