= S.N.P.J., Pennsylvania =

Borough in Pennsylvania, US

S.N.P.J., Pennsylvania Slovenska Narodna Podporna Jednota (Slovene)
- Borough
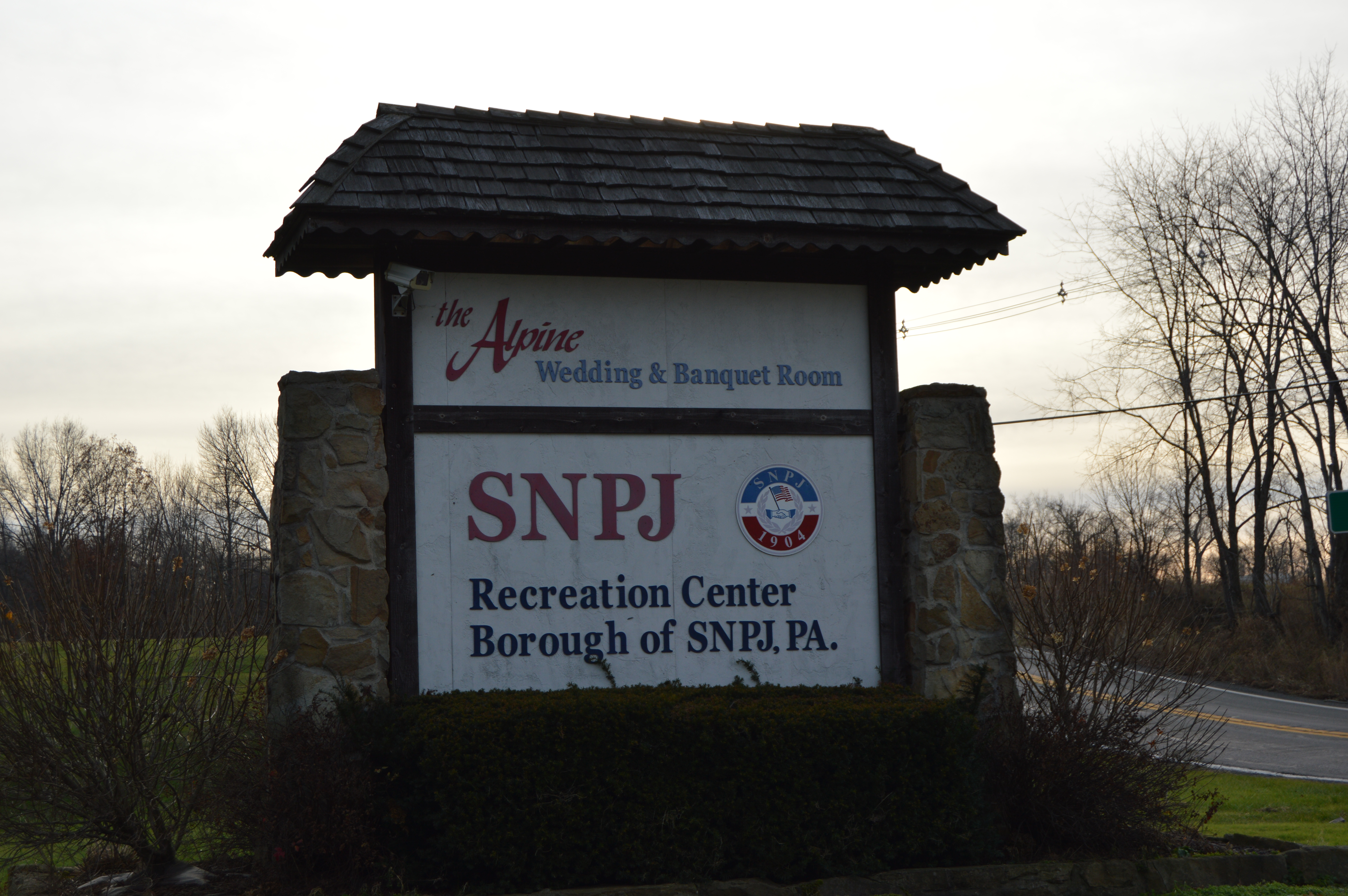
- Welcome sign along Pennsylvania Route 108

- Location in Lawrence County, Pennsylvania
- Coordinates: 40°55′44″N 80°29′55″W
- Country: United States
- State: Pennsylvania
- County: Lawrence
- Established: 1978

Government
  - Mayor: Gerald Sankovich

Area
  - Total: 0.78 sq mi (2.01 km^{2})
  - Land: 0.75 sq mi (1.94 km^{2})
  - Water: 0.027 sq mi (0.07 km^{2})
- Highest elevation (northeast corner): 1,250 ft (380 m)
- Lowest elevation (tributary to Sugar Creek): 1,055 ft (322 m)

Population (2020)
  - Total: 15
  - Density: 25/sq mi (9.8/km^{2})
- Time zone: UTC-4 (EST)
  - Summer (DST): UTC-5 (EDT)
- ZIP code: 16120
- Area code: 724
- FIPS code: 42-71620
- GNIS feature ID: 2390560
- Website: snpjrec.com

S.N.P.J. is a borough in western Lawrence County, Pennsylvania, United States. As of the 2020 census, S.N.P.J. had a population of 18.

== History ==
S.N.P.J. was created out of farmland in extreme Western Pennsylvania that once belonged to nearby Mount Jackson. More of a recreation complex than a community, the society applied to have their 500-acre (200 ha) recreation center designated as a separate municipality in 1977. The borough of S.N.P.J. was created so that the society could, among other things, get its own liquor license. North Beaver Township, the municipality in which the center was originally located, restricted the sale of alcohol on Sundays (blue law).

S.N.P.J. stands for "Slovenska Narodna Podporna Jednota" (Slovene National Benefit Society), a fraternal society and financial co-operative based in North Fayette, Pennsylvania. It has 60 rental cabins, 115 mobile home slots, and an artificial lake. It is open to the public as a summertime resort and facility for bingo, weddings, and dances. Members of the society get a discount on the events.

== Geography ==
Located at 40°55′44″N 80°29′55″W (40.928916, -80.498828), S.N.P.J. is part of the Pittsburgh metropolitan area. According to the United States Census Bureau, the borough has a total area of 0.7 square miles (1.8 km^{2}), with 20 acres (8.1 ha; 0.031 sq mi) of the area covered by water.

== Demographics ==
As of the 2020 Census, S.N.P.J. had a population of 15. S.N.P.J. once had the distinction of being the least-populated borough in the state (but not municipality; East Fork Road District, population 14, was less populous) until a mine fire beneath Centralia made that borough unsafe to live in.

Historical population
Census	Pop.	Note	%±
1980	16		—
1990	12		−25.0%
2000	14		16.7%
2010	19		35.7%
2020	18		−5.3%
2021 (est.)	15	▼	−16.7%

== Education ==
The Mohawk Area School District serves the borough.

== Transportation ==
=== Major roads and highways ===
- PA 108

== See also ==
- Tavistock, New Jersey
