= Battery B, 1st Pennsylvania Light Artillery =

Light artillery battery of the Union Army

- Active: August 5, 1861 - June 9, 1865
- Country: United States
- Allegiance: Union
- Branch: Artillery
- Engagements: Seven Days Battles; Battle of Beaver Dam Creek; Battle of Gaines's Mill; Battle of Glendale; Battle of Malvern Hill; Second Battle of Bull Run; Battle of Antietam; Battle of Fredericksburg; Battle of Chancellorsville; Battle of Gettysburg; Bristoe Campaign; Mine Run Campaign; Battle of the Wilderness; Battle of Spotsylvania Court House; Battle of North Anna; Battle of Cold Harbor; Siege of Petersburg; Battle of Globe Tavern; Battle of Fort Stedman; Third Battle of Petersburg

Battery B, 1st Pennsylvania Light Artillery was a light artillery battery that served in the Union Army as part of the Pennsylvania Reserves infantry division during the American Civil War.

== Service ==
The battery was organized at Mount Jackson, Pennsylvania and mustered in for a three-year enlistment on August 5, 1861 under the command of Captain James H. Cooper.

The battery was attached to McCall's Division, Army of the Potomac, to March 1862. Artillery, 2nd Division, I Corps, Army of the Potomac, to April 1862. Artillery, McCall's Division, Department of the Rappahannock, to June 1862. Artillery, 3rd Division, V Corps, Army of the Potomac, to August 1862. Artillery, 3rd Division, III Corps, Army of Virginia, to September 1862. Artillery, 3rd Division, I Corps, Army of the Potomac, to May 1863. Artillery Brigade, I Corps, to March 1864. Artillery Brigade, V Corps, to March 1865. Artillery Reserve, Army of the Potomac, to June 1865.

Battery B, 1st Pennsylvania Light Artillery mustered out of service June 9, 1865.

== Detailed service ==
Moved to Washington, D.C. August 1861. At Camp Berry, Washington, D.C., until August 14, 1861, and at Tennallytown, Md., until September. At Great Falls, Md., September to December, temporarily transferred to Banks' Division, December 25. Duty at Seneca Falls and Edward's Ferry until January 9, 1862, when the battery rejoined McCall's Division, and at Camp Pierpont near Langley until March 1862. Advanced on Manassas March 10–15. McDowell's advance on Falmouth April 9–19. Duty at Falmouth and Fredericksburg until June. Moved to the Peninsula June 13, and joined the division at Mechanicsville June 30. Seven Days Battles before Richmond June 25-July 1. Beaver Dam Creek or Mechanicsville June 26. Gaines's Mill June 27. Charles City Cross Roads and Glendale June 30. Malvern Hill July 1. At Harrison's Landing until August 15. Movement to join Pope August 15–26. Battle of Gainesville August 28. Battle of Groveton August 29. Second Battle of Bull Run August 30. Battle of Chantilly September 1 (reserve). Maryland Campaign September. Battle of South Mountain September 14. Battle of Antietam September 16–17. Movement to Falmouth, Va., October–November. Battle of Fredericksburg December 12–15. "Mud March" January 20–24, 1863. At Belle Plains until April. Chancellorsville Campaign April 27-May 6. Operations at Pollock's Mill Creek April 29-May 2. Fitzhugh's Crossing April 29–30. Chancellorsville May 2–5. Gettysburg Campaign June 11-July 24. Battle of Gettysburg July 1–3. Duty on the Rappahannock until September 10. Bristoe Campaign October 9–22. Advance to line of the Rappahannock November 7–8. Mine Run Campaign November 26-December 2. Near Kelly's Ford until April 1864. Rapidan Campaign May 4-June 12. Battle of the Wilderness May 5–7. Laurel Hill May 8. Spotsylvania Court House May 8–21. North Anna River May 23–26. Line of the Pamunkey May 26–28. Cold Harbor June 1–12. Before Petersburg June 16–18. Siege of Petersburg June 16, 1864 to April 2, 1865. Weldon Railroad August 18–21, 1864. In the trenches before Petersburg until April 1865. Fort Stedman March 25, 1865. Fall of Petersburg April 2. Ordered to City Point April 3. Moved to Washington, D.C., May. Grand Review of the Armies May 23.

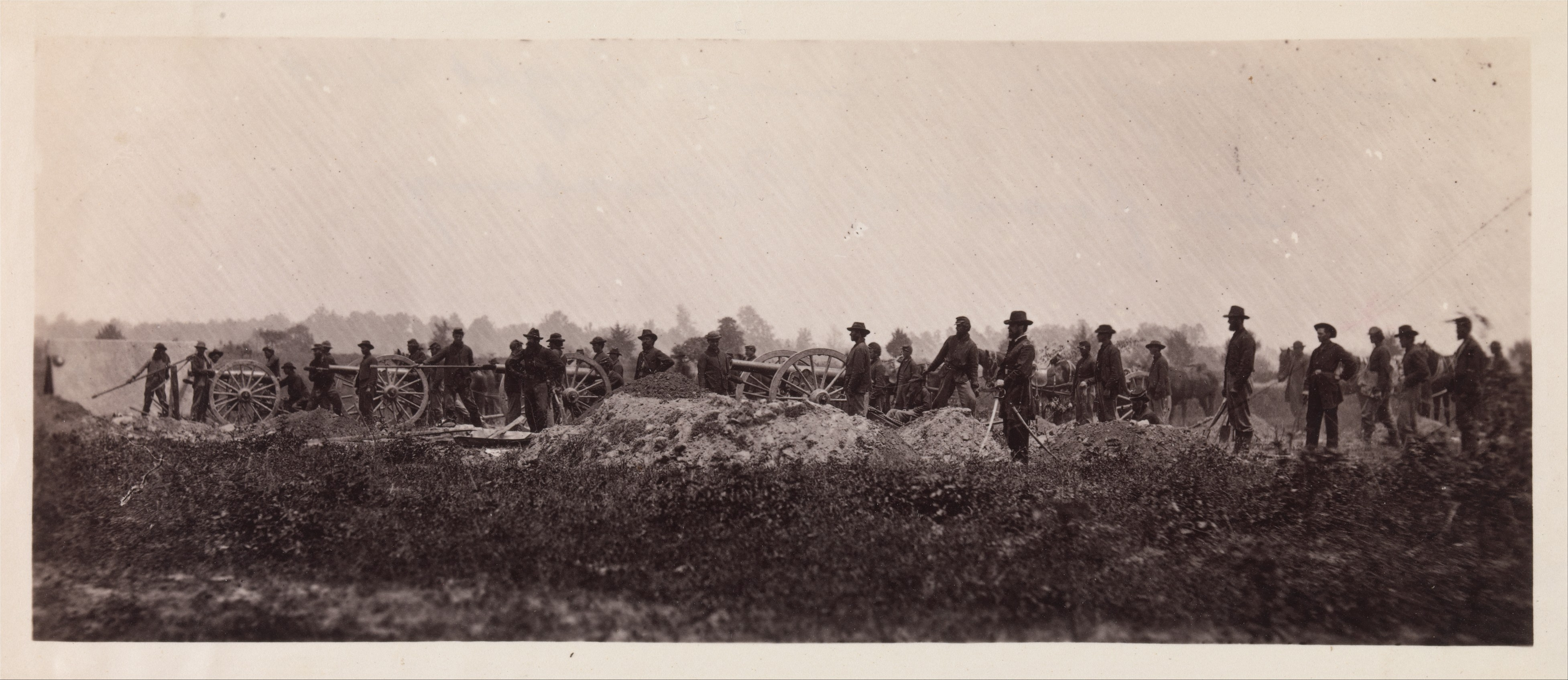
Panorama of Battery B, 1st Pennsylvania Light Artillery deployed south of Petersburg, Va., June 21, 1864 by Timothy H. O'Sullivan

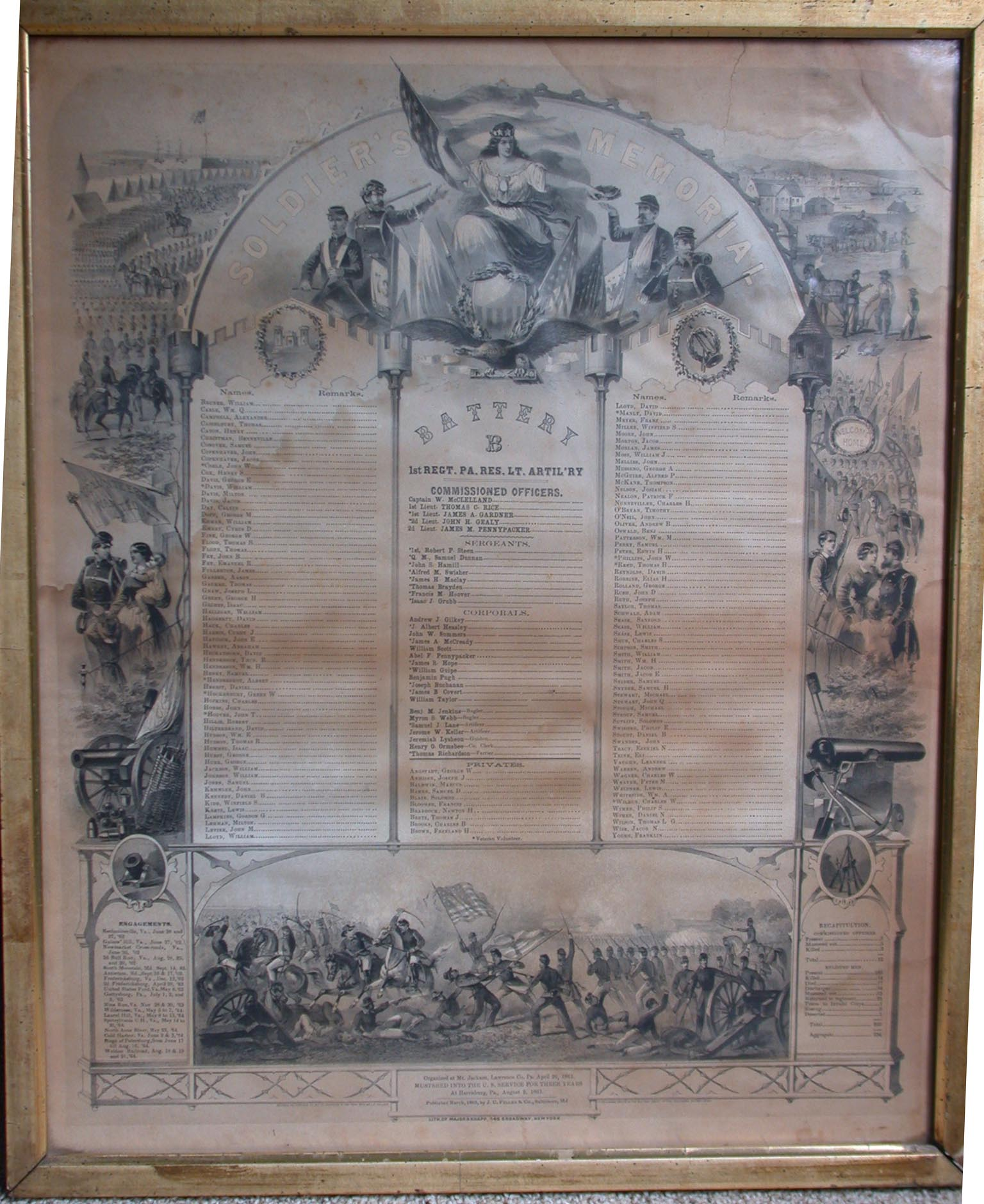

== Casualties ==
The battery lost a total of 38 men during service; 2 officers and 19 enlisted men killed or mortally wounded, 17 enlisted men died of disease.

== Commanders ==
- Captain James H. Cooper - promoted to major of the regiment
- Captain William McClelland

== See also ==
- List of Pennsylvania Civil War Units
- Pennsylvania in the Civil War
