= Pennsylvania Route 108 =

State highway in Pennsylvania, US

Pennsylvania Route 108

Route information
- Maintained by PennDOT
- Length: 31.686 mi (50.994 km)

Major junctions
- West end: CR 8 at the Ohio state line near S.N.P.J.
- I-376 Toll near Mahoningtown; PA 18 in Mahoningtown; PA 168 in New Castle; PA 65 in New Castle; US 19 in Harlansburg; I-79 near Slippery Rock; PA 173 in Slippery Rock
- East end: PA 8 near Forestville

Location
- Country: United States
- State: Pennsylvania
- Counties: Butler, Lawrence

Highway system
- Pennsylvania State Route System; Interstate; US; State; Scenic; Legislative
← PA 107	→ PA 110

Pennsylvania Route 108 (PA 108) is a highway in Western Pennsylvania that runs for 32 miles (51 km) from the Ohio state line near SNPJ to PA 8 in Adams Corner. PA 108 intersects Interstate 376 (I-376) near New Castle and U.S. Route 19 (US 19) near Harlansburg. PA 108 also has an interchange with Interstate 79 (I-79) at exit 105.

== Route description ==
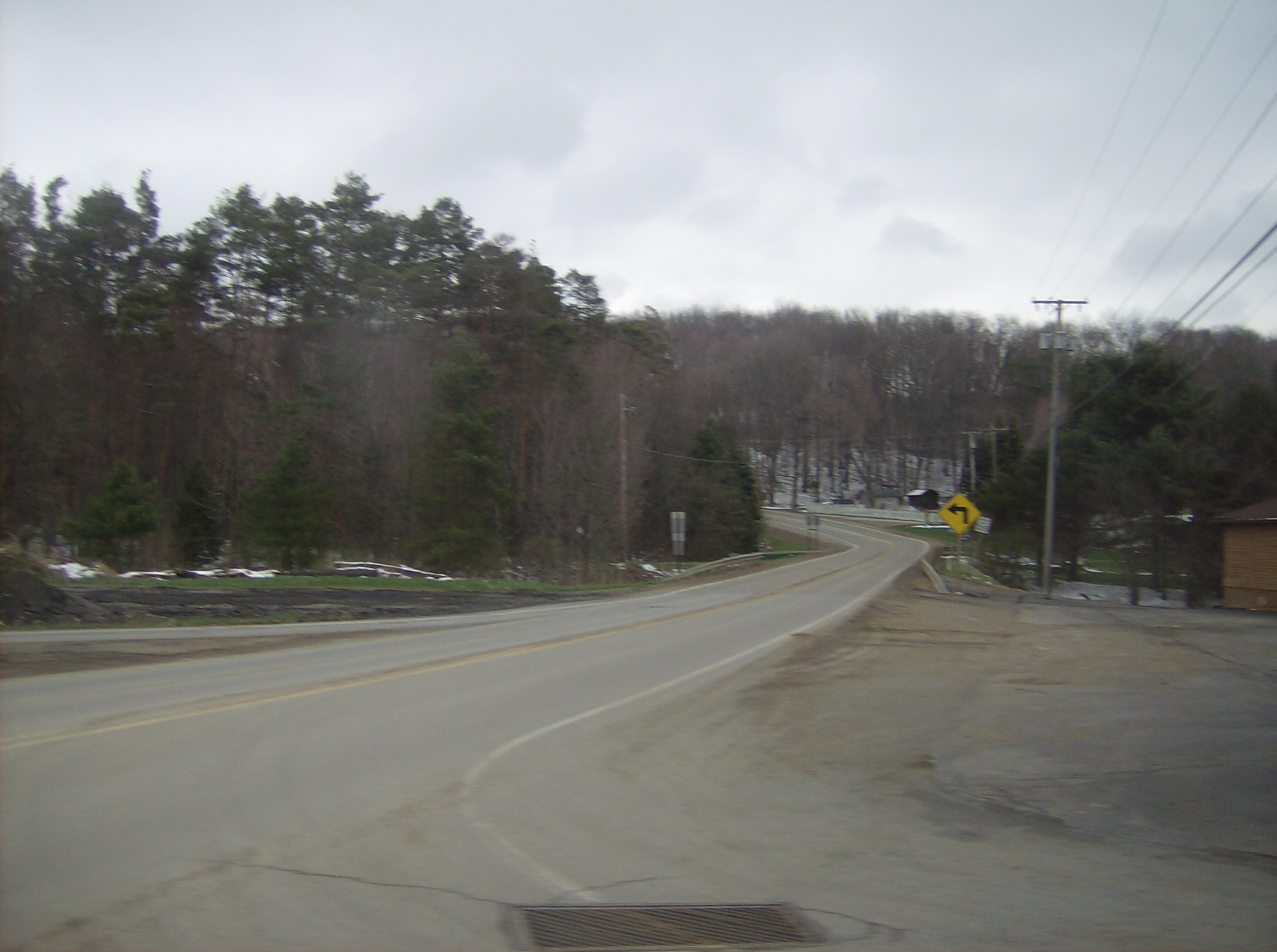
View eastward along PA 108 at its intersection with US 19 at Harlansburg

PA 108 begins at the Ohio border in North Beaver Township, Lawrence County, where the road continues southwest into that state as CR 8 in Mahoning County, providing access to Ohio State Route 170 (SR 170) and SR 617. From the state line, the route heads northeast on two-lane undivided Mt. Jackson Road, passing through farmland with some woods and homes. The route skirts the northern border of the borough of S.N.P.J. in three places, curving more to the east-northeast. PA 108 continues through more rural areas of North Beaver Township, coming to an intersection with PA 551. At this point, the route turns north to form a concurrency with PA 551, remaining Mt. Jackson Road. The road curves northeast through more agricultural areas with some woodland and residences, turning more to the east into wooded areas with some homes. In the community of Mount Jackson, PA 551 splits from PA 108 by heading north along with PA 317. The route continues east-northeast through more farmland and woodland before passing through rural residential areas and coming to an interchange with I-376, becoming a divided highway at this point. Past this interchange, the road becomes undivided again and passes more homes before heading through woods and turning southeast, crossing the Mahoning River. Here, PA 108 becomes the border between Taylor Township to the west and the city of New Castle to the east as it passes commercial establishments and comes to an intersection with PA 18.

At this point, the route turns northeast to join PA 18 on Montgomery Avenue, fully entering New Castle and crossing Norfolk Southern's Youngstown Line. The road continues east into residential areas, with the two routes turning northeast onto South Liberty Street. PA 18/PA 108 passes under CSX's New Castle Subdivision railroad line and becomes North Liberty Street, running past a mix of homes and businesses before passing under the US 422 freeway. The road continues through woodland and homes before heading into more residential areas. The two routes turn east onto Mahoning Avenue and head through industrial areas, crossing a New Castle Industrial Railroad line. The road heads east-northeast over the Shenango River and another New Castle Industrial Railroad line, coming to an intersection with PA 168. Here, PA 18 and PA 108 turn north to follow PA 168 on Moravia Street, passing more industry with some businesses. The road crosses two New Castle Industrial Railroad lines and becomes South Jefferson Street. PA 108 and PA 168 split from PA 18 by turning northeast onto four-lane undivided South Croton Avenue, passing between the Neshannock Creek to the northwest and industrial areas to the southeast. The road crosses US 422 Business and continues to an intersection with the northern terminus of PA 65. PA 108/PA 168 becomes North Croton Avenue and runs between the creek to the northwest and woods and homes to the southeast. The two routes turn away from the creek and head northeast through residential areas with some businesses. The road curves more to the east, with PA 168 splitting from PA 108 by heading northeast.

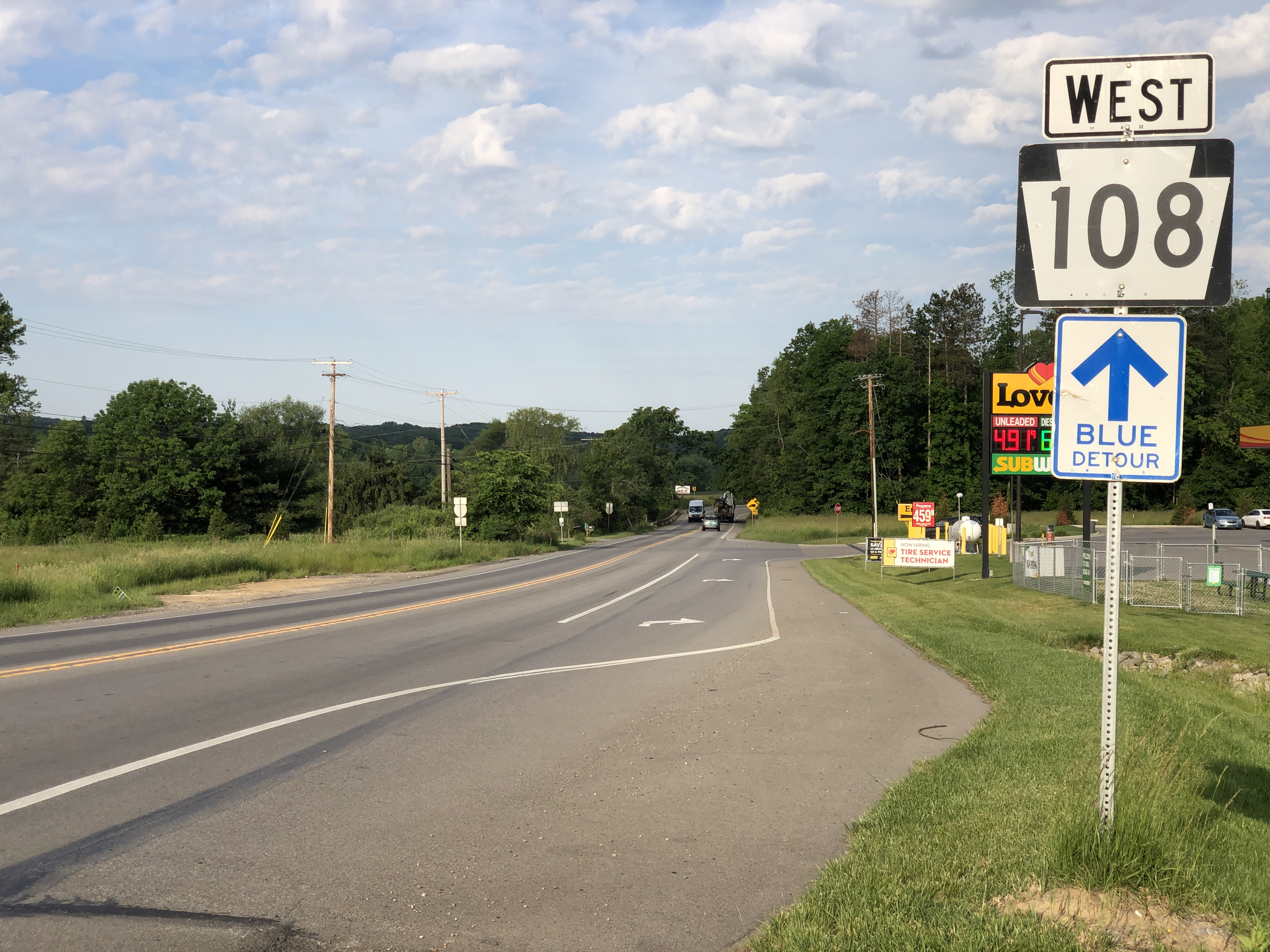
PA 108 westbound past I-79 in Worth Township

PA 108 passes more homes before crossing into Hickory Township and becoming Harlansburg Road, heading through farmland and woodland with some homes. The road continues east through more rural areas, coming to an intersection with PA 388. A short distance past this intersection, the route heads into Scott Township and passes through McCaslin, running through more areas of farms and woods with occasional residences and turning more to the east-northeast. PA 108 comes to the residential community of Harlansburg, where it comes to an intersection with US 19. Past this intersection, the road heads northeast through more agricultural and wooded areas with a few homes, turning more to the east. The route passes through Elliott Mills, at which point it crosses into Plain Grove Township for a short distance.

PA 108 enters Worth Township in Butler County and becomes New Castle Road, turning east-northeast and coming to an interchange with I-79. Past this interchange, the road runs through wooded areas with some fields and homes, crossing Wolf Creek. The route runs northeast through more rural areas, crossing into Slippery Rock Township. Farther northeast, PA 108 heads into the borough of Slippery Rock and becomes New Castle Street, passing through wooded areas of homes. The road heads into the commercial downtown, at which point it comes to an intersection with PA 173 and PA 258. Here, PA 173 turns northeast to form a concurrency with PA 108, and the two routes continue along Franklin Street. The road heads into residential areas, with PA 173 splitting to the north. The route crosses back into Slippery Rock Township and becomes Franklin Road, heading through a mix of farmland and woodland with occasional homes. PA 108 continues northeast to its eastern terminus at PA 8.

== Major intersections ==
County	Location	mi	km	Destinations	Notes
Lawrence	North Beaver Township	0.000	0.000	CR 8 (East Garfield Road) / State Line Road (SR 3003)	Ohio state line; western terminus of PA 108
Lawrence	North Beaver Township	3.094	4.979	PA 551 south (Enon Road)	West end of PA 551 overlap
Lawrence	North Beaver Township	5.568	8.961	PA 317 west / PA 551 north (Mohawk School Road) / Mt. Air Road (SR 3009)	East end of PA 551 overlap; eastern terminus of PA 317
Lawrence	North Beaver Township	7.251– 7.374	11.669– 11.867	I-376 Toll to I-76 / Penna Turnpike – Pittsburgh, New Castle	I-376 exit 17; E-ZPass or toll-by-plate
Lawrence	New Castle	8.599	13.839	PA 18 south (Montgomery Avenue)	West end of PA 18 overlap
Lawrence	New Castle	10.703	17.225	PA 168 south (Moravia Street) to US 422	West end of PA 168 overlap
Lawrence	New Castle	11.591	18.654	PA 18 north (South Jefferson Street) / North Columbus Interbelt	East end of PA 18 overlap
Lawrence	New Castle	11.753	18.915	US 422 Bus. (Grove Street)	
Lawrence	New Castle	11.966	19.257	PA 65 south (East Washington Street)	Northern terminus of PA 65
Lawrence	New Castle	13.149	21.161	PA 168 north (Eastbrook Road) – Volant	East end of PA 168 overlap
Lawrence	Hickory Township	16.019	25.780	PA 388 – Volant, Ellwood City	
Lawrence	Scott Township	20.416– 20.482	32.856– 32.963	US 19 (Perry Highway) – Mercer, Zelienople	
Butler	Worth Township	23.955– 24.116	38.552– 38.811	I-79 – Pittsburgh, Erie	I-79 exit 105
Butler	Slippery Rock	28.160	45.319	PA 173 south (South Main Street) / PA 258 north (North Main Street)	West end of PA 173 overlap; southern terminus of PA 258
Butler	Slippery Rock	28.459	45.800	PA 173 north (Slippery Rock Road) – Grove City	East end of PA 173 overlap
Butler	Slippery Rock Township	31.686	50.994	PA 8 (William Flynn Highway) – Harrisville, Franklin, Butler	Eastern terminus of PA 108
1.000 mi = 1.609 km; 1.000 km = 0.621 mi: Concurrency terminus; Electronic toll collection
