= James Beach Clow House =

Historic house in Pennsylvania, United States

- U.S. National Register of Historic Places
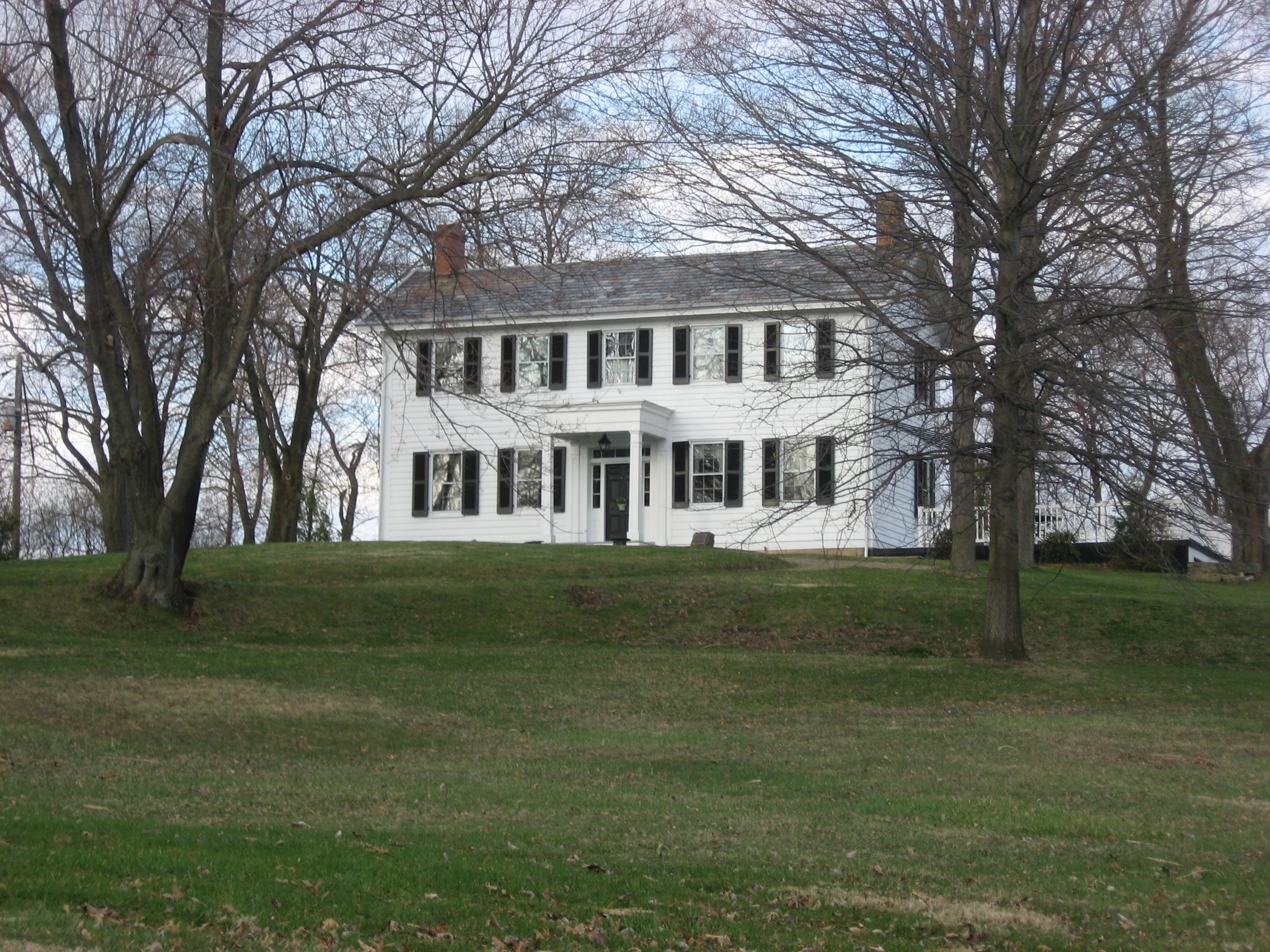
- Front of the Clow House

- Location within Pennsylvania Location within the United States
- Location: Chapel Dr. at Ann St., Ellwood City, Pennsylvania
- Coordinates: 40°49′33″N 80°15′32″W
- Area: 5.7 acres (2.3 ha)
- Built: 1830
- Architectural style: Greek Revival
- NRHP reference No.: 89000349
- Added to NRHP: May 17, 1989

The James Beach Clow House is a historic house in northern Beaver County, Pennsylvania, United States. Located in North Sewickley Township near the community of Ellwood City, the house is a rare surviving example of 19th-century Greek Revival farmhouses in Beaver County.

The Clow House was built circa 1830 by War of 1812 veteran James Beach Clow, a native of Pitt Township in Allegheny County, upon land that he bought in 1821. A leading man in his community, Clow served as justice of the peace in eastern Beaver County in 1830. Besides his position as a "gentleman farmer", Clow was an industrialist, holding a share in a sawmill near his farm. He sold the property to his son Samuel in 1844, but continued to live in the house until his death ten years later. Although the house remained Samuel's home until his death in 1893, it was also a dormitory for students attending a school across the road during most of the 1870s. After the deaths of Samuel and his widow, the property passed through several different owners before farming ended in 1950.

Besides the house, early buildings on the property include an original outhouse and a spring house. The property also included an early barn and miscellaneous multi-purpose building, but these two structures were removed in 1959. Today, the house lies along Chapel Drive southeast of Ellwood City; its prominent hilltop location makes it visible to the south and east to a distance of several miles. Although a modern residential subdivision is located along Chapel immediately to the north of the Clow property, it retains much of its historic integrity amid a primarily rural setting. This places it in contrast with most period wooden Greek Revival farmhouses in rural Beaver and Lawrence counties: nearly all surviving examples of this type of architecture have been heavily modified. Only one other Greek Revival house in Beaver County is listed on the Register — the William B. Dunlap Mansion in the borough of Bridgewater in the central part of the county — and the county's only other 19th-century farmhouse on the Register is the David Littell House in the county's far south.
