= Eastbrook, Pennsylvania =

Unincorporated community in Pennsylvania, US

- Unincorporated community
- Location within Pennsylvania Location within the United States
- Coordinates: 41°02′29″N 80°16′41″W
- Country: United States
- State: Pennsylvania
- County: Lawrence
- Township: Hickory
- Elevation: 974 ft (297 m)
- Time zone: UTC-5 (Eastern (EST))
  - Summer (DST): UTC-4 (EDT)
- Area code: 724
- GNIS feature ID: 1173908

Eastbrook (also East Brook) is an unincorporated community in Hickory Township, Lawrence County, Pennsylvania, United States.

== Notable person ==
Calvin Willard Gilfillan (1832-1901), Pennsylvania politician and lawyer, was born near East Brook, in Lawrence County.
