= Mohawk Area School District =

School district in Pennsylvania

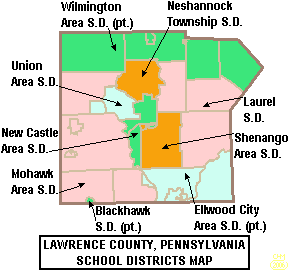

Address
- 325 Mohawk School Road Western Pennsylvania Bessemer, Lawrence County, Pennsylvania, 16112-0025; United States
- Coordinates: 40.978545°N 80.454359°W

District information
- Type: Public
- Motto: We Achieve

Students and staff
- Athletic conference: WPIAL Dist. 7
- Colors: Red, black, and white

Other information
- Website: www.mohawk.k12.pa.us/home

Mohawk Area School District is a rural, public school system in Bessemer, Lawrence County, Pennsylvania, United States. Mohawk Area School District encompasses approximately 101 square miles (260 km^{2}). It is the largest school district in Lawrence County by area, serving the boroughs of Bessemer, New Beaver and SNPJ, as well as the townships of Mahoning (except for the southeastern part), Little Beaver, and North Beaver. According to 2010 federal census data, it serves a resident population of 10,850 people. In 2009, the district residents’ per capita income was $17,048, while the median family income was $42,756. In the Commonwealth, the median family income was $49,501 and the United States median family income was $49,445, in 2010.

Mohawk Area School District operates 2 schools, Mohawk Elementary School and Mohawk Junior Senior High School. The high school was built in 1963. In 1983, the elementary was constructed in an adjacent space of land to the high school. The district produces a newsletter/newspaper called "The Mohawk News" that is delivered to every addressee in the school district every season. The Lawrence County Career and Technical Center is an alternative facility for students in grades 10–12.

== Extracurriculars ==
Mohawk Area School District offers a variety of clubs, activities and an extensive sports program.

=== Sports ===
The District funds:

Boys

- Baseball - AA
- Basketball- AA

WPIAL CHAMPIONS - 1970 PIAA RUNNERS-UP 1970

- Cross Country - AA
- Football - A
- Golf - AA
- Soccer - AA
- Track and Field - AA

WPIAL CHAMPIONS - 1988, 1989, 1990, 1991, 1992, 1994

Girls

- Basketball - AA

WPIAL CHAMPIONS- 2020, 2021 PIAA Runners-Up 2021

- Cross Country - A

WPIAL CHAMPIONS - 2020, 2023 PIAA RUNNERS-UP - 2020, 2021

- Soccer (Fall) - A
- Softball - AA
- Track and Field - AA

WPIAL CHAMPIONS - 2021

- Volleyball

Junior High School Sports

Boys

- Basketball
- Football
- Track and Field

Girls

- Basketball
- Track and Field
- Volleyball

According to PIAA directory July 2012
