= Enon Valley, Pennsylvania =

Borough in Pennsylvania, US

- Borough
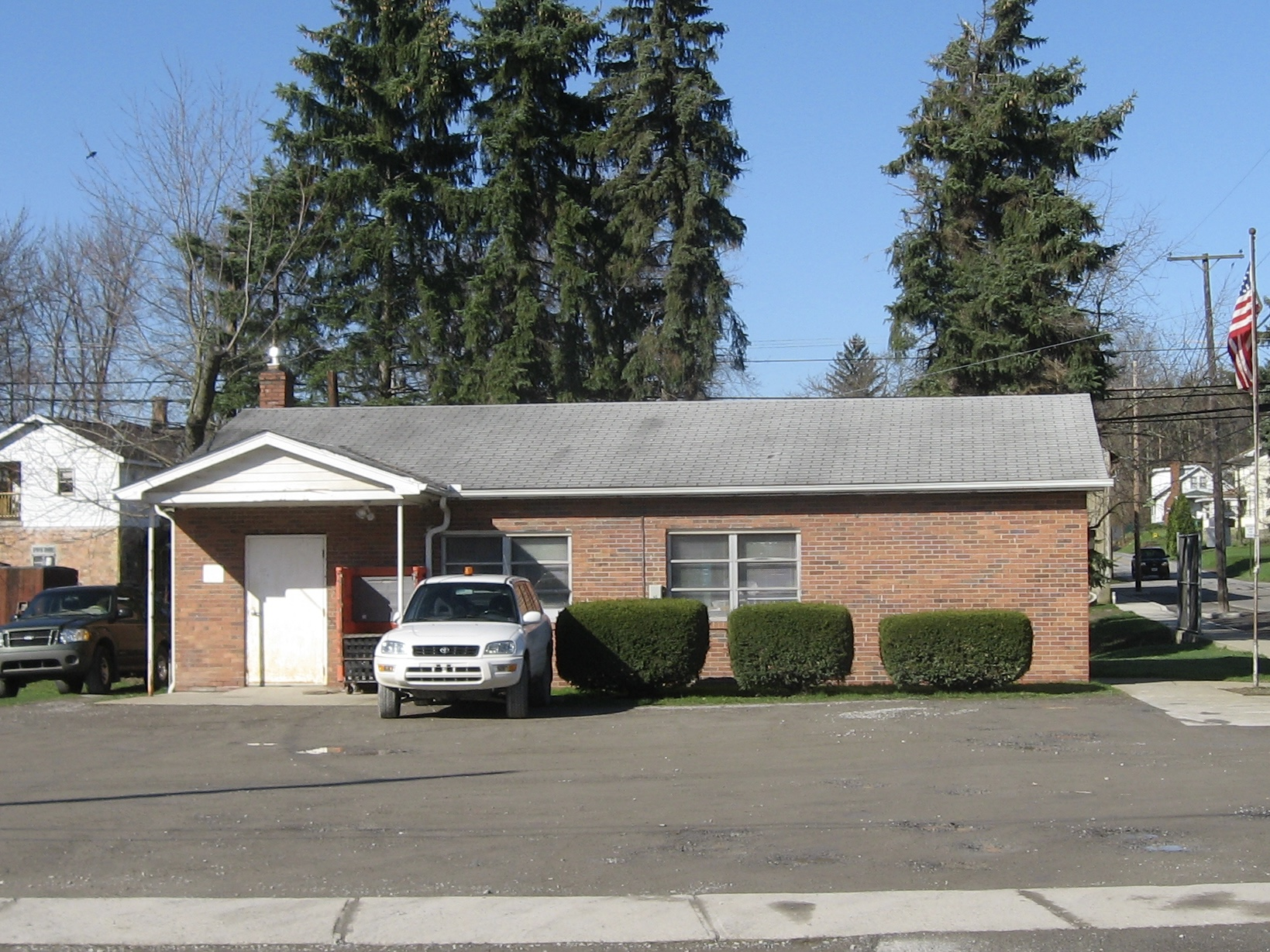
- Enon Valley Post Office
- Etymology: "Valley of Many Waters"
- Location in Lawrence County, Pennsylvania
- Coordinates: 40°51′23″N 80°27′22″W
- Country: United States
- State: Pennsylvania
- Counties: Lawrence
- Established: 1899

Government
  - Mayor: Timothy Stear, Sr.

Area
  - Total: 0.49 sq mi (1.28 km^{2})
  - Land: 0.49 sq mi (1.27 km^{2})
  - Water: 0.0077 sq mi (0.02 km^{2})
- Elevation (center of borough): 995 ft (303 m)
- Highest elevation (two locations at southeast and western border): 1,140 ft (350 m)
- Lowest elevation (North Fork Little Beaver Creek): 785 ft (239 m)

Population (2020)
  - Total: 301
  - Density: 615.6/sq mi (237.68/km^{2})
- Time zone: UTC-4 (EST)
  - Summer (DST): UTC-5 (EDT)
- Zip code: 16120
- Area codes: 724, 878
- FIPS code: 42-23768
- Website: https://www.enonvalleyboropa.gov/

Enon Valley is a borough in southern Lawrence County, Pennsylvania, United States. The population was 297 at the 2020 census. It is part of the Pittsburgh metropolitan area.

== Geography ==
Enon Valley is located at 40°51′23″N 80°27′22″W (40.856310, -80.456192).

According to the United States Census Bureau, the borough has a total area of 0.5 square miles (1.3 km^{2}), all land.

== Demographics ==
Historical population
Census	Pop.	Note	%±
1880	471		—
1900	395		—
1910	354		−10.4%
1920	359		1.4%
1930	360		0.3%
1940	368		2.2%
1950	392		6.5%
1960	455		16.1%
1970	427		−6.2%
1980	408		−4.4%
1990	355		−13.0%
2000	387		9.0%
2010	306		−20.9%
2020	301		−1.6%
2021 (est.)	294	▼	−2.3%

As of the census of 2000, there were 387 people, 138 households, and 105 families residing in the borough. The population density was 746.5 inhabitants per square mile (288.2/km^{2}). There were 149 housing units at an average density of 287.4 per square mile (111.0/km^{2}). The racial makeup of the borough was 98.71% White, 0.52% African American, 0.52% Asian, and 0.26% from two or more races. Hispanic or Latino of any race were 0.78% of the population.

There were 138 households, out of which 36.2% had children under the age of 18 living with them, 63.8% were married couples living together, 6.5% had a female householder with no husband present, and 23.9% were non-families. 20.3% of all households were made up of individuals, and 6.5% had someone living alone who was 65 years of age or older. The average household size was 2.80 and the average family size was 3.23.

In the borough the population was spread out, with 25.6% under the age of 18, 9.0% from 18 to 24, 29.5% from 25 to 44, 22.5% from 45 to 64, and 13.4% who were 65 years of age or older. The median age was 36 years. For every 100 females there were 97.4 males. For every 100 females age 18 and over, there were 104.3 males.

The median income for a household in the borough was $38,417, and the median income for a family was $39,167. Males had a median income of $32,083 versus $14,375 for females. The per capita income for the borough was $23,161. None of the families and 2.9% of the population were living below the poverty line, including no under eighteens and none of those over 64.

== Education ==
The Blackhawk School District in neighboring Beaver County serves the borough.

== Transportation ==
=== Major roads and highways ===
- PA 351
- PA 551
