= Edinburg, Pennsylvania =

Unincorporated community in Pennsylvania, US

- Unincorporated community
- Location within Pennsylvania Location within the United States
- Coordinates: 41°00′52″N 80°26′12″W
- Country: United States
- State: Pennsylvania
- County: Lawrence
- Township: Mahoning
- Elevation: 794 ft (242 m)
- Time zone: UTC-5 (Eastern (EST))
  - Summer (DST): UTC-4 (EDT)
- ZIP code: 16116
- Area codes: 724, 878
- GNIS feature ID: 1174022

Edinburg is an unincorporated community in Lawrence County, Pennsylvania, United States. The community is located along Pennsylvania Route 551 near U.S. Route 224 on the south bank of the Mahoning River, 4.7 miles (7.6 km) west of New Castle. Edinburg has a post office with ZIP code 16116.

== Demographics ==
Historical population
| Census | Pop. | Note | %± |
|---|---|---|---|
| 2023 (est.) | 160 |

The United States Census Bureau defined Edinburg as a census designated place in 2023.
