= Bessemer, Lawrence County, Pennsylvania =

Borough in Pennsylvania, US

Bessemer, Pennsylvania
- Borough
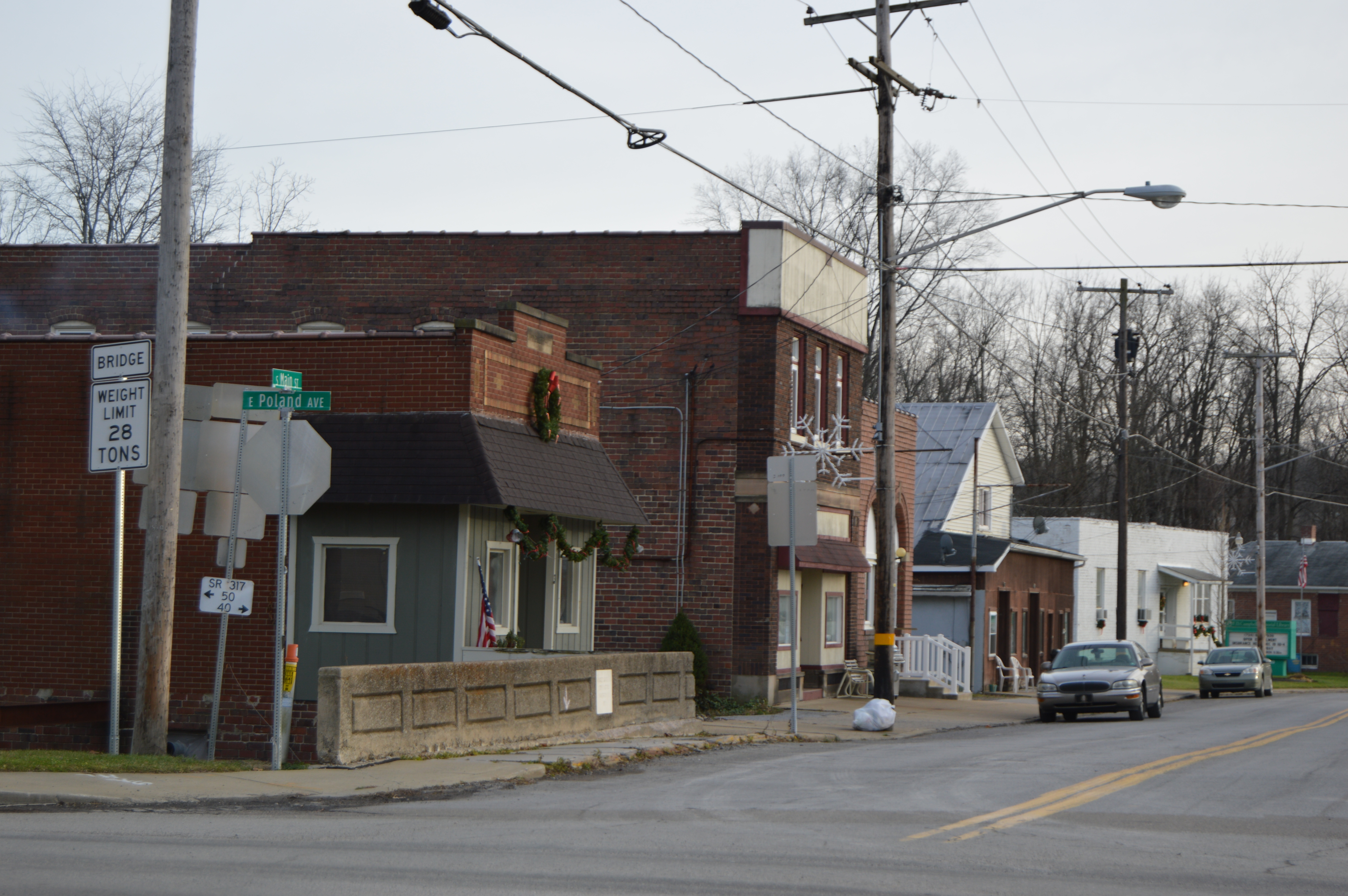
- Main Street downtown

- Location in Lawrence County, Pennsylvania
- Coordinates: 40°58′26″N 80°29′15″W
- Country: United States
- State: Pennsylvania
- County: Lawrence
- Incorporated: 1913

Government
  - Mayor: Nathan Leslie

Area
  - Total: 1.73 sq mi (4.48 km^{2})
  - Land: 1.65 sq mi (4.28 km^{2})
  - Water: 0.077 sq mi (0.20 km^{2})
- Elevation (center of downtown): 1,086 ft (331 m)
- Highest elevation (near south border): 1,222 ft (372 m)
- Lowest elevation (Hickory Run): 1,040 ft (320 m)

Population (2020)
  - Total: 1,076
  - Density: 650.6/sq mi (251.18/km^{2})
- Time zone: UTC-4 (EST)
  - Summer (DST): UTC-5 (EDT)
- ZIP code: 16112
- Area code: 724
- FIPS code: 42-05936
- GNIS feature ID: 1215351
- Website: bessemerpa.com

Bessemer is a borough in western Lawrence County, Pennsylvania, United States. The population was 1,073 at the 2020 census. It is part of the Pittsburgh metropolitan area.

== Geography ==
Bessemer is located at 40°58′26″N 80°29′15″W (40.973960, -80.487517).

According to the United States Census Bureau, the borough has a total area of 1.7 square miles (4.4 km^{2}), of which 1.7 square miles (4.4 km^{2}) is land and 0.1 square miles (0.26 km^{2}), or 2.89%, is water.

== Demographics ==
Historical population
Census	Pop.	Note	%±
1920	1,417		—
1930	2,001		41.2%
1940	1,635		−18.3%
1950	1,461		−10.6%
1960	1,491		2.1%
1970	1,427		−4.3%
1980	1,293		−9.4%
1990	1,196		−7.5%
2000	1,172		−2.0%
2010	1,111		−5.2%
2020	1,073		−3.4%
2021 (est.)	1,064		−0.8%

As of the census of 2000, there were 1,172 people, 480 households, and 345 families residing in the borough. The population density was 701.1 inhabitants per square mile (270.7/km^{2}). There were 496 housing units at an average density of 296.7 per square mile (114.6/km^{2}). The racial makeup of the borough was 98.55% White, 0.51% African American, 0.43% Asian, and 0.51% from two or more races. Hispanic or Latino of any race were 0.77% of the population. In 2000 census 9.5% of population related Croatian backgrounds, the highest percentage of the population of any municipality in the United States.

There were 480 households, out of which 27.7% had children under the age of 18 living with them, 55.8% were married couples living together, 12.3% had a female householder with no husband present, and 28.1% were non-families. 25.0% of all households were made up of individuals, and 15.6% had someone living alone who was 65 years of age or older. The average household size was 2.44 and the average family size was 2.91.

In the borough the population was spread out, with 22.3% under the age of 18, 6.8% from 18 to 24, 28.0% from 25 to 44, 21.2% from 45 to 64, and 21.7% who were 65 years of age or older. The median age was 40 years. For every 100 females there were 89.3 males. For every 100 females age 18 and over, there were 88.6 males.

The median income for a household in the borough was $30,781, and the median income for a family was $35,250. Males had a median income of $32,024 versus $20,069 for females. The per capita income for the borough was $15,677. About 9.1% of families and 10.0% of the population were below the poverty line, including 16.0% of those under age 18 and 4.6% of those age 65 or over.

== Education ==
The Mohawk Area School District serves the borough.

== Transportation ==
=== Major roads and highways ===
- PA 317

== Notable people ==
- Charley Burley, professional boxer
- Frank M. Clark, U.S. Representative
