= List of former state routes in Ohio (50–130) =

This is a list of former state routes in Ohio since 1923 with route numbers from 50 through 130 inclusive.

== SR 50 (1923–1926) ==
State Route 50
- Location: Lebanon–Newberry Township
- Existed: 1923–1926

SR 50 was the route that connected Lebanon to the community of Abe within Newberry Township, Miami County from 1923 to 1926. The route was replaced by SR 48 by 1927.

== SR 51 (1923–1934) ==
State Route 51
- Location: Dayton–Greenville
- Existed: 1923–1934

SR 51 was a route in western Ohio that existed between 1923 and 1934. Originally, the route ran from downtown Dayton to SR 54 (currently US 33) in Willshire. In 1932, it was briefly extended north to SR 17 (now US 224) west of Middlebury before being truncated to Greenville the next year having been replaced by SR 49. By 1935, the route was fully absorbed into SR 49.

== SR 52 (1923–1926) ==
State Route 52
- Location: Middletown–Irwin
- Existed: 1923–1926

SR 52 was a route in southwestern Ohio from 1923 through 1926. During its first three years in existence, the route ran from Middletown to Springfield. In 1926, the route was extended northeast to SR 55 north of Irwin. The route was replaced in the next year by SR 4 due to the inclusion of US 52 in Ohio.

== SR 59 (1923–1938) ==
State Route 59
- Location: Bellevue–Elyria
- Existed: 1923–1938

SR 59 was a route through the northern portion of Ohio from 1923 until 1938. Its eastern terminus had always been in Elyria but its western terminus had been shifted numerous times throughout its history. From 1923 through 1928, the route began in Norwalk, traveled northeast to Berlinsville, and continued east to Elyria. In 1929, the route began in Milan but within the next year, it was extended west to Bellevue. By 1939, the route had been replaced by an extended SR 113.

== SR 62 (1923–1931) ==
State Route 62
- Location: Galion–Oak Harbor
- Existed: 1923–1931

SR 62 was a route that connected Galion and Oak Harbor via Bucyrus and Fremont. The route followed the same alignment for its entire history from 1923 through 1931 when it was renumbered to SR 19 in 1931 due to the addition of US 62 in Ohio.

== SR 63 (1923–1926) ==
State Route 63
- Location: Carey–Sylvania
- Existed: 1923–1926

SR 63 was a route across northwestern Ohio between Carey and Sylvania by way of Fostoria, Perrysburg, and Maumee. The route was in existence from 1923 until 1926. After 1926, the route south of Perrysburg by US 23, US 20 between Perrysburg and a point northwest of Ottawa Hills, and SR 263 north of there.

== SR 68 (1923–1932) ==
State Route 68
- Location: Union City–Waldo
- Existed: 1923–1932

SR 68 was a route through central Ohio that existed between 1923 and 1931. For most of the route's history, the route traveled from Dawn to northwestern Delaware County. In 1930, the route was extended east to Waldo. By 1933, due to the presence of the newly created US 68 through the state, SR 68 was renumbered to SR 47.

== SR 69 ==
State Route 69
- Location: Dayton–Tontogany
- Existed: 1923–1968

SR 69 was a major route in west-central Ohio. The route was in existence from 1923 until 1968 when most of the route was renumbered to SR 235.

== SR 70 (1923–1962) ==
State Route 70
- Location: Cynthiana–Covington
- Existed: 1923–1962

SR 70 was a route that currently makes up the northernmost portion of SR 41. Between 1923 and 1925, the route ran from Washington Court House to Covington, but was extended south in 1926 to a point near Cynthiana. In 1962, the entire route was renumbered as extensions of other routes due to the creation of I-70 through Ohio. The route south of Greenfield became a southern extension of SR 753 and the remainder became a northern extension of SR 41.

== SR 71 (1923–1962) ==
State Route 71
- Location: Union City–Crystal Lakes
- Existed: 1923–1962

SR 71 was the route that is now the full length of SR 571 which runs from Union City to US 40 just north of Crystal Lakes. The route was created in 1923 running along numerous state highways created in the 1910s. The only deviation SR 71 made from the current SR 571 was near its eastern terminus prior to 1950; instead of turning sharply south east of New Carlisle, SR 71 continued east and ended at US 40 east of Donnelsville. The route's change in designation came about in 1962 due to the creation of I-71, the route was renumbered to SR 571.

== SR 74 (1923–1962) ==
State Route 74
- Location: Cincinnati–Franklin Township
- Existed: 1923–1962

SR 74 was the predecessor to SR 32 that existed from 1923 through 1962. Originally, the route ran from Cincinnati (near SR 32's current western terminus) to Wayne Township, Adams County at what was then SR 137 south of Seaman. Two years later, the route's eastern terminus was moved to just east of Peebles in Franklin Township. The route became SR 32 in 1962 upon the creation of I-74 west of Cincinnati. Most of what was SR 74 is no longer maintained as a state highway since SR 32 was largely moved onto newly constructed divided highways as a part of the construction of the Appalachian Highway.

== SR 75 (1923–1962) ==
State Route 75
- Location: Ironton–Stone Creek
- Existed: 1923–1962

SR 75 consisted of what is now SR 93 from Ironton to West Lafayette and the entirety of SR 751 from West Lafayette to Stone Creek. The route existed from 1923 through 1962. Except for different routings between Otsego and Isleta prior to 1930, the route largely remained unchanged throughout its history. The route became SR 93 and SR 751 in 1962 due to the creation of I-75 in the western part of the state.

The 75 number continues to exist on a historic tunnel north of Ironton. The tunnel built in 1866 was bypassed in 1960 and currently serves as a tourist attraction and a haunted house around Halloween.

External links

- Ironton Tunnel (Formerly OH 75) - Bridges & Tunnels

== SR 76 (1923–1972) ==
State Route 76
- Location: Belpre–Avon Lake
- Existed: 1923–1972

SR 76 was a state route that existed from 1923 until 1972 when it was renumbered to two different highways, SR 83 and SR 339, due to the renumbering of Interstate 80S to I-76. At the time of its creation in 1923, SR 76 only ran from New Concord to Wooster and followed a more westerly alignment between Coshocton and Millersburg. By 1927, the route was moved to the modern-day SR 83 alignment between Coshocton and Millersburg and extended south to Beverly. In 1932, the southern terminus was moved to Vincent and to just west of Belpre in 1935. By 1937, the route was extended north to the Lake Erie shoreline at Avon Lake; SR 76 would remain at this alignment for nearly 35 years. When the 76 route number was reused for the Interstate highway in 1972, the portion of the route north of SR 60 near Beverly became SR 83 while the part south of Beverly became an extended SR 339.

== SR 77 (1923–1962) ==
State Route 77
- Location: Marietta–Shreve
- Existed: 1923–1962

SR 77 was a state route that ran from Marietta to just south of Shreve. When it was created in 1923, the route only ran from McConnelsville to Trinway. In 1934, the route took over what was SR 37 southeast of McConnelsville to end in Marietta. By 1938, SR 77 was extended north taking over all of SR 234 to end at SR 514 near Shreve. When the route was renumbered due to the addition of I-77 in the state, SR 77 south of SR 39 in Monroe Township, Holmes County became an extended SR 60 while the remaining 6.7 miles (10.8 km) became the new route SR 754.

== SR 80 (1923–1962) ==
State Route 80
- Location: Sandyville–Edinburg
- Existed: 1923–1962

SR 80 was a state route that existed from 1923 and 1962 and ran in eastern Ohio. At the time of its creation, the route ran from Minerva to Welshfield though by 1927, its southern terminus was moved to Sandyville and its northern terminus was moved to Burton in 1939. During this period, the alignment of SR 80 had changed many times between Alliance and Edinburg. In 1941, coinciding with the establishment of the Ravenna Arsenal, the segment of SR 80 between Charlestown and Freedom was deleted leaving two segments of the route. Within one year, the northern segment became SR 700 and the remaining section's northern terminus was truncated to Edinburg. SR 80 would remain on this alignment (except for a slight realignment near Limaville in 1948) until 1962 when the route was renumbered to SR 183 due to the addition of I-80 in the state.

== SR 81 (1923–1926) ==
State Route 81
- Location: Brentwood Lake–Aurora
- Existed: 1923–1926

SR 81 was a state route south of Cleveland that existed from 1923 through 1926. Originally, the route ran from its western terminus at Brentwood Lake between Grafton and Elyria to its eastern end in Twinsburg. In 1926, the route was extended slightly to the east to end at Aurora. Within the year, the entire route became a western extension of SR 82.

== SR 83 (1923–1957) ==
State Route 83
- Location: Ashtabula–Monroe Township
- Existed: 1923–1957

SR 83 was a short state route in the northeastern corner of Ohio. The route always had its western terminus in or around Ashtabula but the route had three different alignments throughout its history. Its first alignment, created in 1923 over the former route of SR 476 started just south of Ashtabula, headed east through Sheffield and ended at the Pennsylvania state line in Monroe Township. This alignment would last until 1927. The next year, SR 83 began by traveling northeast from the southern section of Ashtabula to Kingsville then headed southeast to Monroe Center to end at SR 7. This routing would remain in place until 1938 when SR 83 swapped routes with SR 84. The final routing of SR 83 started in southern Ashtabula and traveled east (on an alignment different than the 1923 route) to Kelloggsville before jogging south to Monroe Center ending at SR 7. By 1958, SR 83 was removed from the state highway system and the roads on which it traveled were transferred to Ashtabula County.

== SR 89 (1923–1926) ==
State Route 89
- Location: Canton–Aurora
- Existed: 1923–1926

SR 89 was a state route that connected Canton and Aurora between 1923 and 1926. The route was absorbed into the longer SR 43 in 1927.

== SR 90 (1923–1962) ==
State Route 90
- Location: Petersburg–North Kingsville
- Existed: 1923–1962

SR 90 was the former designation for the northernmost portion of modern-day SR 170 and SR 193. Created in 1923, it started at the Pennsylvania state line near Petersburg where the road continued as PA 351 and traveled north through Youngstown to its end in North Kingsville. The route did not undergo any changes until it was renumbered in 1962 due to the addition of I-90 in the state. Most of the route became a northern extension of SR 170 that year with the small portion between Petersburg and Pennsylvania becoming an extension of SR 617. In 1969, the portion of the former route north of Youngstown became SR 193.

== SR 92 (1923–1936) ==
State Route 92
- Location: Ghent
- Existed: 1923–1936

SR 92 was a short 2.5-mile-long (4.0 km) connector route in the vicinity of Ghent. The route followed Ghent Road and served as a shortcut between Akron and Parma by bypassing Montrose. The route, which existed from 1923 through 1936, was replaced by SR 176 when it was extended south to Akron. Today, the road is no longer state-maintained, the section outside of the city of Fairlawn is Summit County Road 98.

Browse numbered routes
← SR 91	OH	→ SR 93

== SR 95 (1923–1926) ==
State Route 95
- Location: Strasburg–Wooster
- Existed: 1923–1926

SR 95 was a state highway that ran between SR 13 near Strasburg to Wooster and existed from 1923 through 1926. The route was replaced in 1926 by SR 6 and is now a part of US 250.

== SR 102 (1923–1939) ==
State Route 102
- Location: Elmore–Toledo
- Existed: 1923–1939

SR 102 was a state route in the northwest part of Ohio. From 1923 until 1926, the route traveled from the vicinity of Holland at SR 2 to a point south of Elmore at SR 2 and US 23, mostly along the route of modern-day US 20 but including a small portion of what became SR 223 and SR 326. In 1926, SR 102 was moved off of the route of the newly designated US 20 onto a route that followed the modern-day SR 51. This routing would last until 1939 when it was replaced by SR 120.

In the Ohio state highway maps of 1946 through 1949, SR 102 appears on the route of SR 120 west of Toledo to the Michigan state line. Maps prior and following these years show the route as SR 120.

== SR 106 (1923–1937) ==
State Route 106
- Location: Gomer–Findlay
- Existed: 1923–1937

SR 106 was the route that traveled through west central Ohio from 1923 through 1937. At the time of its designation, the route ran from Delphos to Republic by way of Fort Jennings, Findlay, and Tiffin. Two years later, the two ends of the route were moved: The western terminus was moved to SR 5 (later US 30N) near Gomer and the eastern terminus was moved to SR 2 west of Bellevue. Finally, the route's eastern end was moved to Findlay in 1927. This routing would remain in place until 1937 when the route was replaced by an extended SR 12.

Browse numbered routes
← SR 105	OH	→ SR 107

== SR 108 (1923–1935) ==
State Route 108
- Location: Hicksville Township–Bryan
- Existed: 1923–1935

SR 108 was a former state route in northwestern Ohio. First designated in 1923, the route originally ran from Tully Township, Van Wert County at SR 5 (now US 30) to near Alvordton at SR 23 (current US 20). Within two years, the southern terminus was moved to Hicksville. By 1930, the route was extended at both ends to state lines; the southern terminus was moved to southwest of Hicksville at the Indiana state line (also the end of SR 18) and the northern terminus was moved to the Michigan state line northwest of Fayette. Within the next year, US 127 took over all of SR 108 north of Bryan. By 1936, the route was deleted and replaced by an extended SR 2.

== SR 109 (1923–1926) ==
State Route 109
- Location: Harrison Township–Ottawa
- Existed: 1923–1926

SR 109 was a state highway in western Ohio that existed from 1923 to 1926. The route ran from the Indiana state line in Harrison Township, Van Wert County to Ottawa. In 1926, the entire route became a part of SR 17 and is now part of US 224.

== SR 112 (1923–1926) ==
State Route 112
- Location: Sylvania–Toledo
- Existed: 1923–1926

SR 112 was a former section of the current SR 51 between Sylvania and Toledo. The route existed from 1923 until 1926. In 1926, the route became renumbered to US 127 but today is a part of SR 51.

== SR 112 (1926–1950) ==
State Route 112
- Location: Portsmouth–Waverly
- Existed: 1926–1950

SR 112 was a highway from Portsmouth to Waverly. It was renumbered from part of SR 104 in 1926 because US 23 replaced the middle section of SR 104. By 1951, this route became part of SR 104 again.

== SR 112 (1965–1973) ==
State Route 112
- Location: Toledo
- Existed: c. 1965–1973

SR 112 was a cancelled freeway named the Downtown Distributor that would have run from Interstate 75 north of the current Anthony Wayne Trail terminus through downtown, along the banks of the Maumee River. On a county map from 1973, ramps off I-75 were to have begun a freeway marked as State Route 112. It was planned to run to the Maumee River, through the historic St. Patrick's Catholic Church. This is why neither ODOT nor the city has built it. It would have ended at the Summit Street interchange on Interstate 280, and would have had a spur providing a freeway connection to the Anthony Wayne Bridge.

=== Major intersections ===
The entire route was in Toledo, Lucas County.

mi	km	Destinations	Notes	
				Was to be southbound exit and northbound entrance on I-75
				Westbound exit and eastbound entrance
				Eastbound exit and westbound entrance
				Freeway Connector to the Anthony Wayne Bridge; Eastbound exit and westbound entrance
				Eastbound exit and westbound entrance
				Eastbound exit and westbound entrance
				Was to use the Summit Street interchange on I-280
1.000 mi = 1.609 km; 1.000 km = 0.621 mi: Incomplete access

== SR 120 (1923–1939) ==
State Route 120
- Location: Brock–Piqua
- Existed: 1923–1939

SR 120 was the route that now follows the general route of SR 185. The route ran from Brock at what was first designated SR 9, later US 127 to Piqua and existed from 1923 until 1939.

== SR 124 (1923–1926) ==
State Route 124
- Location: Sharonville–Franklin
- Existed: 1923–1926

SR 124 was a state highway between Sharonville and Franklin that existed from 1923 through 1926. In 1926, the entire route became a part of US 25 and was subsequently deleted.

== SR 125 (1923–1926) ==
State Route 125
- Location: Monroe–Lebanon
- Existed: 1923–1926

SR 125 was the predecessor to SR 63 from west of Monroe to Lebanon. The route existed from 1923 until 1926 when it was replaced by SR 63.

== SR 126 (1923–1926) ==
State Route 126
- Location: Hamilton–College Corner
- Existed: 1923–1926

SR 126 was a state highway that ran from Hamilton to the Indiana state line in College Corner from 1923 to 1926. In 1926, the route was replaced by three different routes: SR 224 (now SR 177) from Hamilton to just northwest of the city, the entire length of SR 130, and US 27 from McGonigle to the state line.

== SR 127 (1923–1926) ==
State Route 127
- Location: Scipio–Hamilton
- Existed: 1923–1926

SR 127 was a state route that ran from near the Indiana state line in Scipio to the northwestern portion of Hamilton. The route existed from 1923 until 1926 when it was renumbered due to the addition of US 127 in Ohio. The route number became SR 129 and has remained on this alignment since then.

== SR 129 (1923–1926) ==
State Route 129
- Location: Scipio–Cincinnati
- Existed: 1923–1926

SR 129 was a state highway between the Indiana state line and northwestern Cincinnati. The route headed southeast from the unincorporated community of Scipio through Venice and Dunlap before ending at SR 9 in Cincinnati. First created in 1923, the route existed for about three years. In 1926, the part of the route northwest of Venice became SR 126 while the remainder became US 27.

== SR 130 (1923–1926) ==
State Route 130
- Location: Harrison–Cheviot
- Existed: 1923–1926

SR 130 was a state route in the southwest corner of Ohio. The route existed from 1923 until 1926 and traveled between the Indiana state line in Harrison to Cheviot, a northwest suburb of Cincinnati, at SR 7. By 1927, the route became a part of US 52.
