= Springfield Local School District (Mahoning County) =

School district in Ohio, United States

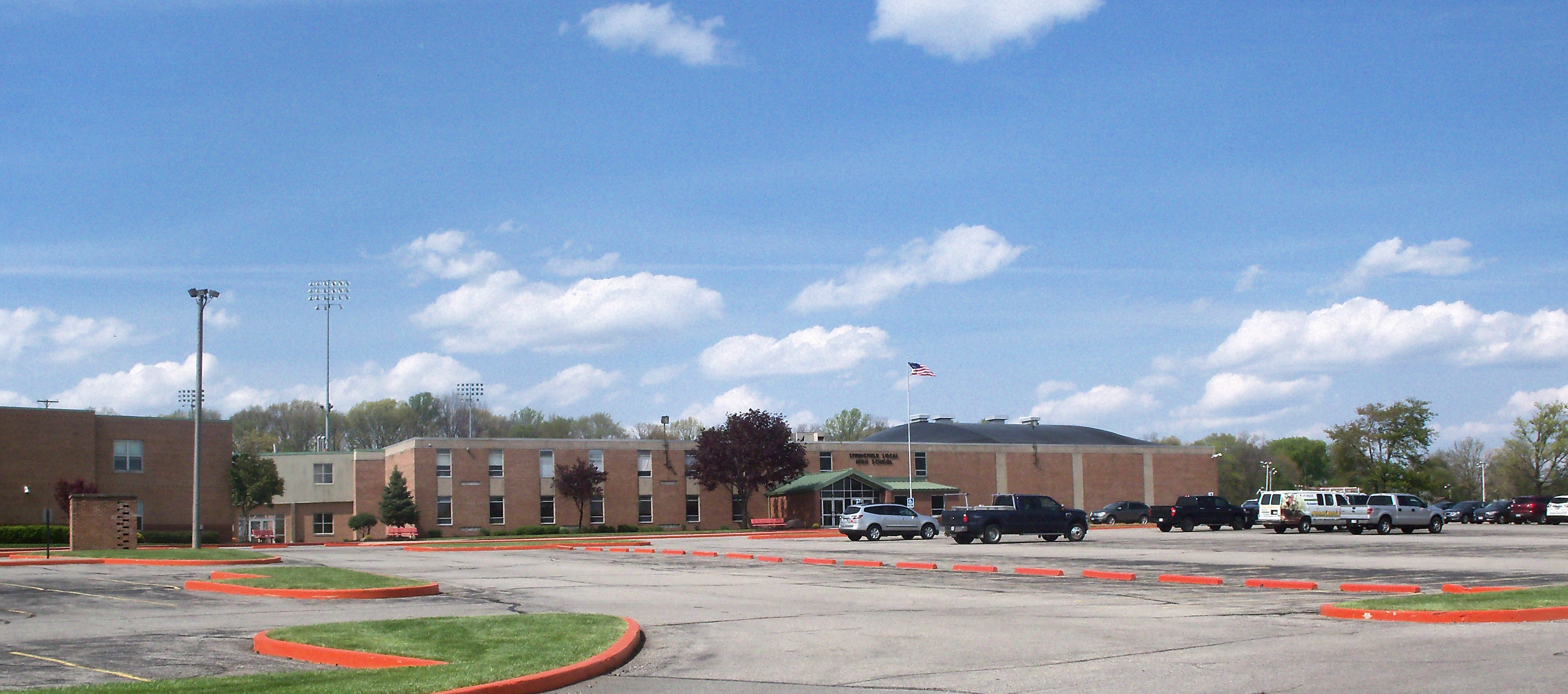
- Springfield Local High School entrance

Address
- PO Box 549 New Middletown, Ohio, 44442; United States

District information
- Type: Public
- Grades: K-12
- Superintendent: Rachael Smith
- Accreditation: Ohio Department of Education
- NCES District ID: 3904837

Students and staff
- Enrollment: 858 (2024–25)
- Staff: 59.80 (FTE)
- Student–teacher ratio: 14.35
- District mascot: Tigers
- Colors: Orange and Black

Other information
- Website: www.springfieldlocal.us

The Springfield Local School District is a school district located in southwestern Mahoning County, Ohio. The school district serves students in grades K-12 living in New Middletown, New Springfield, and parts of Springfield townships. The district consists of one high school, one middle school and one elementary school. All buildings and offices are located in New Middletown.

== History ==
The Springfield Local School District was formed in the early 1900s. Springfield Local High School was built in 1917.

A new elementary building was built in 2015, the building costed $10 million.

== Schools ==
=== High school ===
- Springfield Local High School

=== Middle school ===
- Springfield Intermediate School

=== Elementary school ===
- Springfield Elementary School

=== Former schools ===
- New Middletown School
- New Springfield School
