= Cynthiana =

Cynthiana may refer to:

- Cynthiana, Kentucky, a city in Harrison County, Kentucky, United States
  - the Cynthiana meteorite of 1877, which fell in Kentucky, United States (see meteorite falls)
- Cynthiana, Indiana, a town in Posey County, Indiana, United States
- Cynthiana, Ohio, a town in Pike County, Ohio, United States
- Norton (grape), also known as the Cynthiana grape.
