= Isleta (disambiguation) =

Isleta is a Tanoan pueblo in New Mexico.

Isleta may also refer to:

== Places ==
=== New Mexico ===
- Isleta Village Proper, a census-designated place near the pueblo
- Isleta station, a railroad station south of Albuquerque, New Mexico
- Isleta Diversion Dam on the Rio Grande
- Isleta Amphitheater, in Albuquerque, New Mexico

=== Elsewhere ===
- Isleta, Ohio, an unincorporated community
- La Isleta Lighthouse, Canary Islands

== See also ==
- Ysleta, Texas, a community in El Paso, Texas
- Ysleta del Sur Pueblo, a Tanoan pueblo in Texas
