= Springfield News =

Springfield News may refer to one of the following newspapers:

- Springfield Daily News, in Springfield, Massachusetts
- Springfield News, published in Oregon from 1903 to 2006
- Springfield News, an online offering of Quest Community Newspapers in Australia
- Springfield News-Leader, in Springfield, Missouri
- Springfield News-Sun, in Springfield, Ohio

== See also ==
- New Springfield, Ohio, an unincorporated community
- Springfield (disambiguation)
