= Kelloggsville =

Kelloggsville may refer to:

- Kelloggsville, New York
- Kelloggsville, Ohio

== See also ==
- Kelloggsville Public Schools
