= Ohio State Route 304 =

State highway in Trumbull County, Ohio, US

State Route 304

Route information
- Maintained by ODOT
- Length: 9.97 mi (16.05 km)
- Existed: 1932–present

Major junctions
- West end: US 422 in Girard
- US 62 / SR 7 in Hubbard
- East end: PA 318 near Hubbard

Location
- Country: United States
- State: Ohio
- Counties: Trumbull

Highway system
- Ohio State Highway System; Interstate; US; State; Scenic
← SR 303	→ SR 305

State Route 304 (SR 304) is an east–west state highway in the northeastern portion of Ohio. The western terminus of SR 304 is at a signalized intersection with US 422 in Girard. Its eastern terminus is at the Pennsylvania State Line nearly 3 miles (4.8 km) east of Hubbard, where the highway continues east as Pennsylvania Route 318.

Created in the early 1930s, SR 304 traverses the northern suburban portions of the Youngstown area. The state highway generally runs in parallel with Interstate 80 for its entire length.

== Route description ==
SR 304 begins at a signalized intersection in downtown Girard at the junction of Churchhill Road and North State Street. North State Street carries US 422 through Girard. The state route heads east from here on a two-lane road passing through mostly residential neighborhoods while in Girard. At the city limits, SR 304 crosses over the SR 11 freeway without an interchange and enters Liberty Township. In the center of the township, SR 304 intersects SR 193 also called Belmont Avenue. The area surrounding the intersection contains more commercial businesses and a cemetery but as SR 304 continues east, it reenters a mostly residential setting. After traveling due east for about 4 miles (6.4 km), the route curves slightly to the east-southeast and crosses over I-80 without an interchange. At this point, the route also enters Hubbard Township and has a grade crossing with a Norfolk Southern railroad.

Soon after entering Hubbard Township, it enters the city of Hubbard on Liberty Street. Before entering the downtown business district of the city, US 62 and SR 7 as Hubbard Road intersect SR 304 at a skewed intersection; the three routes form a concurrency and travel east together on Liberty Street. The surroundings include more businesses as the routes get closer to the center of the city. In the center of Hubbard, specifically at the intersection of Main Street, US 62 and SR 7 break the concurrency and head north while SR 616 begins and heads south. SR 304 continues due east on Liberty Street for about 0.6 miles (0.97 km) before curving northeast and straddling the Hubbard City–Township line. As it fully reenters Hubbard Township, the route is in a rural setting with few houses and the Deer Creek Golf Course sitting beside the route. At the Pennsylvania state line, SR 304 ends, but the road continues east as another state highway, PA 318. That route continues east towards the borough of West Middlesex.

The entirety of SR 304 is located in southeastern Trumbull County. No part of SR 304 is incorporated within the National Highway System, a system of highways determined to be most important for the nation's economy, mobility and defense.

== History ==
SR 304 was first designated in 1932 along the routing between US 422 in Girard and PA 318 at the Pennsylvania state line east of Hubbard that it follows today. At the time of its designation, the route had been fully paved. SR 304 has not experienced any significant changes since then.

== Major intersections ==
The entire route is in Trumbull County.

Location	mi	km	Destinations	Notes
Girard	0.00	0.00	US 422 (North State Street)	Western terminus of SR 304
Liberty Township	2.03	3.27	SR 193 (Belmont Avenue) – Youngstown	
Hubbard	6.30	10.14	US 62 west / SR 7 south (Youngstown-Hubbard Road)	Western terminus of US 62/SR 7 concurrency
Hubbard	7.10	11.43	US 62 east / SR 7 north (North Main Street) / SR 616 south (South Main Street)	Eastern temrinus of US 62/SR 7 concurrency, northern terminus of SR 616
Hubbard Township	9.97	16.05	PA 318 east (Hubbard-Middlesex Road)	Eastern terminus of SR 304 at Pennsylvania state line
1.000 mi = 1.609 km; 1.000 km = 0.621 mi: Concurrency terminus
