= Springfield Township, Mahoning County, Ohio =

Township in Ohio, US

Springfield Township
- Civil township
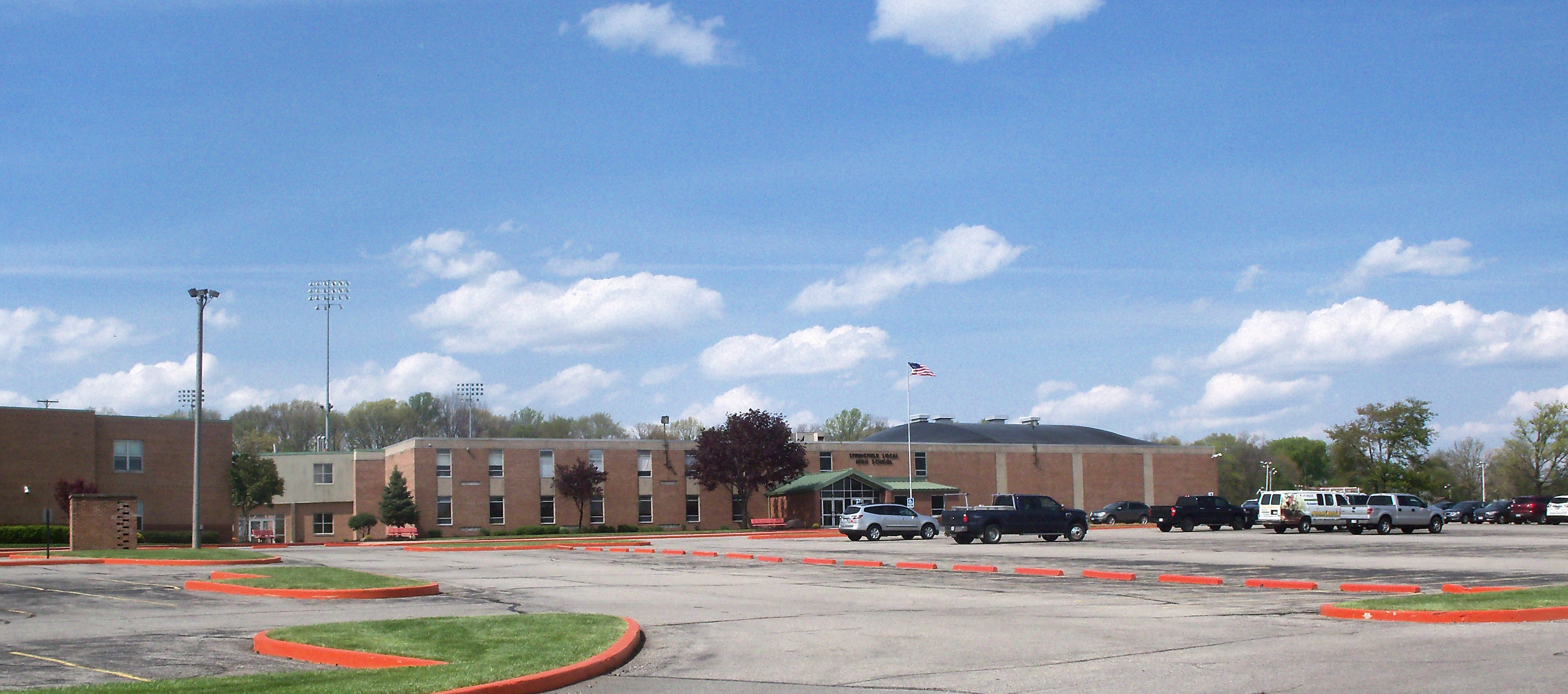
- Springfield High School

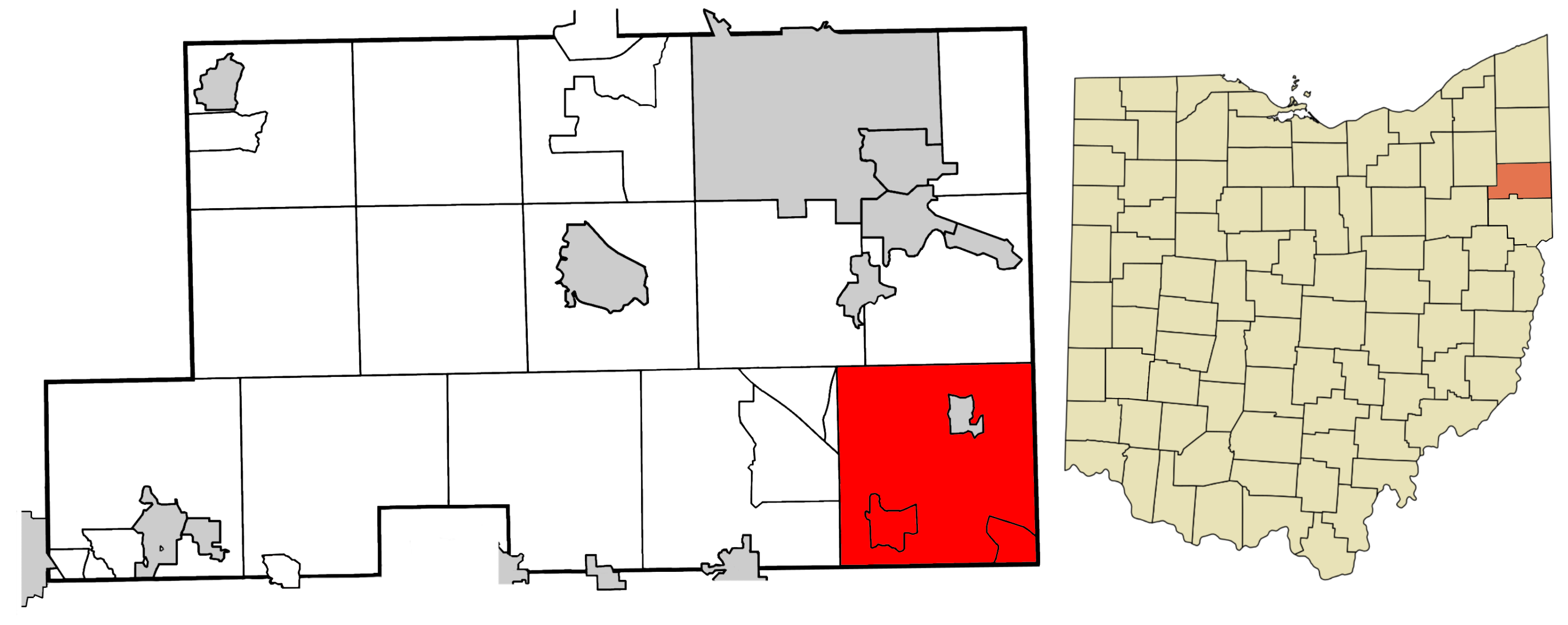
- Location of Springfield Township in Mahoning County
- Coordinates: 40°56′47″N 80°34′28″W
- Country: United States
- State: Ohio
- County: Mahoning

Area
  - Total: 34.9 sq mi (90.4 km^{2})
  - Land: 33.4 sq mi (86.6 km^{2})
  - Water: 1.5 sq mi (3.8 km^{2})
- Elevation: 1,191 ft (363 m)

Population (2020)
  - Total: 6,800
  - Density: 200/sq mi (79/km^{2})
- Time zone: UTC-5 (Eastern (EST))
  - Summer (DST): UTC-4 (EDT)
- FIPS code: 39-74124
- GNIS feature ID: 1086571
- Website: springfieldtownshipmah.org

Springfield Township is one of the fourteen townships of Mahoning County, Ohio, United States. The 2020 census found 6,800 people in the township.

== Geography ==
Located in the southeastern corner of the county along the Pennsylvania border, it borders the following townships:

- Poland Township - north
- Mahoning Township, Lawrence County, Pennsylvania - northeast corner
- North Beaver Township, Pennsylvania - east
- Little Beaver Township, Lawrence County, Pennsylvania - southeast
- Unity Township, Columbiana County - south
- Fairfield Township, Columbiana County - southwest corner
- Beaver Township - west
- Boardman Township - northwest

The village of New Middletown is located in central Springfield Township, and two unincorporated communities lie in the township: New Springfield in the south, and Petersburg in the southeast.

== Name and history ==
It is one of eleven Springfield Townships statewide.

For many years, the township was part of Columbiana County, before becoming part of Mahoning County in 1846.

== Government ==
The township is governed by a three-member board of trustees, who are elected in November of odd-numbered years to a four-year term beginning on the following January 1. Two are elected in the year after the presidential election and one is elected in the year before it. There is also an elected township fiscal officer, who serves a four-year term beginning on April 1 of the year after the election, which is held in November of the year before the presidential election. Vacancies in the fiscal officership or on the board of trustees are filled by the remaining trustees.
