= Ohio State Route 617 =

State highway in Mahoning County, Ohio, US

State Route 617

Route information
- Maintained by ODOT
- Length: 4.74 mi (7.63 km)
- Existed: 1937–present

Major junctions
- West end: SR 165 / CR 8 near New Springfield
- East end: PA 351 near Petersburg

Location
- Country: United States
- State: Ohio
- Counties: Mahoning

Highway system
- Ohio State Highway System; Interstate; US; State; Scenic
← SR 616	→ SR 618

State Route 617 (SR 617) is a short east–west state route in northeastern Ohio, existing entirely within Springfield Township, Mahoning County. The western terminus of SR 617 is at SR 165 in the unincorporated community of New Springfield. Its eastern terminus is at the Pennsylvania State Line just southeast of the hamlet of Petersburg, where SR 617 turns into Pennsylvania Route 351 (PA 351).

== Route description ==
The journey of SR 617 begins at the intersection of SR 165 and Garfield Road (Mahoning County Road 8 to the west) in the Mahoning County hamlet of New Springfield. Heading east through Springfield Township, SR 617 comes upon its intersection with Beard Road (County Road 167 or CR 167), passes by some homes, then curves through some woods and resumes a due east trend, passing by both woods and farmland, residences and commercialized businesses, alike, along the way. Next, SR 617 meets Unity Road (CR 175), and then a little further along the route, Hofmeister Road (CR 189). There, SR 617 follows a gradual reverse curve that takes it southeasterly, then back to the east. As the number of homes along the route starts to increase, especially on the south side, SR 617 turns again to the southeast, then easterly yet again, where it comes upon Waterford Road. Further east, SR 617 enters into the unincorporated community of Petersburg, where the route bends to the northeast, and arrives at its western junction with SR 170, which comes into the intersection from the south. SR 170 and SR 617 run concurrently for approximately two blocks to the main intersection within the hamlet, where the two routes arrive at the eastern split of the concurrency. From the intersection: SR 170 heads to the northwest; CR 8, which goes on to become PA 108 just one mile (1.6 km) from the intersection, resumes to the northeast; and SR 617 goes to the southeast.

Traversing southeast from SR 170, SR 617 passes through a primarily residential area, intersecting a few side streets as the route makes its way out of Petersburg. Once back into a more rural setting, SR 617 passes through farmland, with a few homes dotting the landscape. Arriving at the Pennsylvania state line, SR 617 comes to an end. The highway continues into Pennsylvania as PA 351.

== History ==
SR 617 was designated in 1937 along the path that it currently occupies. No major changes have taken place to the routing of SR 617 since its certification.

== Major intersections ==
The entire route is in Springfield Township, Mahoning County.

mi	km	Destinations	Notes
0.00	0.00	SR 165 (Woodworth Road) / CR 8 (East Garfield Road) – East Palestine, New Springfield, North Lima	
3.68	5.92	SR 170 south (Petersburg-Unity Road)	Western end of SR 170 concurrency
3.77	6.07	SR 170 north (Youngstown-Pittsburgh Road) / CR 8 (East Garfield Road) – S.N.P.J., PA, New Castle, PA	Eastern end of SR 170 concurrency
4.74	7.63	PA 351 east	Pennsylvania state line
1.000 mi = 1.609 km; 1.000 km = 0.621 mi: Concurrency terminus
