= Carlisle Township, Ohio =

Township in Ohio, US

Carlisle Township, Lorain County, Ohio
- Township
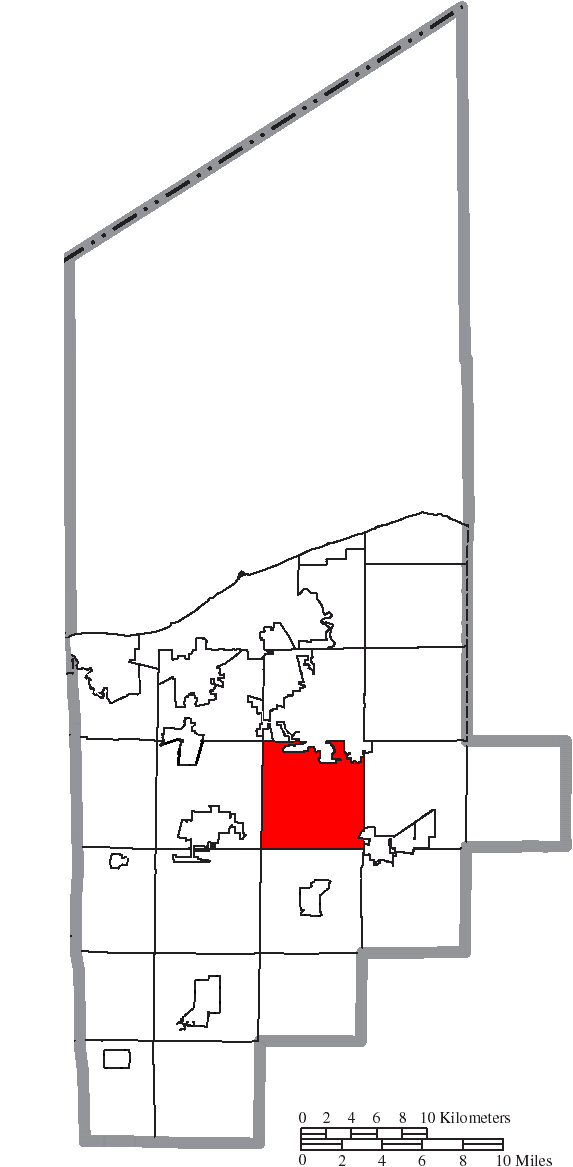
- Location of Carlisle Township in Lorain County
- Coordinates: 41°18′55″N 82°7′14″W
- Country: United States
- State: Ohio
- County: Lorain

Area
  - Total: 24.17 sq mi (62.59 km^{2})
  - Land: 23.78 sq mi (61.60 km^{2})
  - Water: 0.38 sq mi (0.99 km^{2})
- Elevation: 758 ft (231 m)

Population (2020)
  - Total: 7,124
  - Density: 299.5/sq mi (115.6/km^{2})
- Time zone: UTC-5 (Eastern (EST))
  - Summer (DST): UTC-4 (EDT)
- FIPS code: 39-12140
- GNIS feature ID: 1086505
- Website: carlisletownship.com

Carlisle Township is one of the eighteen townships of Lorain County, Ohio, United States. As of the 2020 census the population was 7,124.

== Geography ==
Located in central Lorain County, it borders the following townships and cities:

- Elyria Township - north, west of Elyria city
- Elyria - north, east of Elyria Township
- Eaton Township - east
- Grafton - southeast
- LaGrange Township - south
- Pittsfield Township - southwest corner
- New Russia Township - west
- Amherst Township - northwest corner

The unincorporated community of Brentwood Lake lies in far eastern Carlisle Township.

== Name and history ==
It is the only Carlisle Township statewide. Carlisle Township was established in 1822.

== Government ==
The township is governed by a three-member board of trustees, who are elected in November of odd-numbered years to a four-year term beginning on the following January 1. Two are elected in the year after the presidential election and one is elected in the year before it. There is also an elected township fiscal officer, who serves a four-year term beginning on April 1 of the year after the election, which is held in November of the year before the presidential election. Vacancies in the fiscal officership or on the board of trustees are filled by the remaining trustees.
