= Raymond Robinson (Green Man) =

American urban legend

- Robinson in 1981
- Born: Raymond Theodore Robinson; October 29, 1910; Beaver County, Pennsylvania, U.S.
- Died: June 11, 1985 (aged 74); Brighton Township, Pennsylvania, U.S.
- Resting place: Grandview Cemetery, Beaver Falls.
- Other names: The Green Man, Charlie No-Face
- Known for: Urban legend based around nighttime walks along State Route 351

Raymond Theodore Robinson (October 29, 1910 – June 11, 1985), known as the Green Man or Charlie No-Face, was an American man whose years of nighttime walks made him into a figure of urban legend in western Pennsylvania. Robinson was profoundly disfigured in a childhood electrical accident, causing him to rarely appear in public during the day for fear of frightening people. He instead took long strolls after dark along State Route 351.

== Injury ==
On June 18, 1919, when Robinson was eight years old, he was injured by an electrical line as he climbed a pole and reached for a bird's nest on the Morado Bridge outside of Beaver Falls. The bridge carried a trolley and had electrical lines of both 11,000 and 22,000 volts. These lines were responsible for the death of another boy in September 1918, less than a year earlier.

Robinson survived, defying doctors' expectations, but he was severely disfigured; he lost his eyes, nose, and right arm.

== Adult life ==
Robinson lived in Koppel, Pennsylvania and spent his days at home with relatives while making a modest living selling doormats, wallets, and belts. Because of his appearance, he rarely ventured out during the day. However, at night, he went for long walks along a quiet stretch of State Route 351, feeling his way along with a walking stick.

Groups of locals regularly gathered to search for him walking along the road. Robinson usually hid from his curious neighbors but would sometimes exchange a short conversation or a photograph for beer or cigarettes. Some were friendly, others cruel, but none of these encounters deterred Robinson from his nightly walks. He was struck by cars more than once.

He stopped his walks during the last years of his life and retired to the Beaver County Geriatric Center, where he died in 1985 at the age of 74.

== Legacy ==
Robinson became a local legend in the Pittsburgh area, with the tales about him sometimes eclipsing actual fact. In popular mythos, he is known as "Green Man", or "Charlie No-Face", a mysterious faceless entity that may be seen walking along Route 351 at night. Some legends alleged that Green Man hid in an abandoned house during the day. His moniker originated from reports that his skin had a greenish glow, allegedly a result of his electric shock. In reality, Robinson possessed a typical, if pale, complexion.

Filmmaker Tisha York planned to direct and publish the film Route 351 based on the Green Man urban legend in 2008, intending to complete it in 2009. Shooting was delayed by the economic crisis of 2008 and has officially been on hold since then. York holds the film rights to the story, though a complete documentary has yet to be made.

On July 24, 2026, the rock and blues duo, 7horse, released "Charlie No-Face," inspired by Robinson's life and legend.
