= Ohio State Route 112 =

State Route 112

Route information
- Maintained by ODOT

Location
- Country: United States
- State: Ohio

Highway system
- Ohio State Highway System; Interstate; US; State; Scenic
← SR 111	→ SR 113

In Ohio, State Route 112 may refer to:

- Ohio State Route 112 (1923-1927), now part of SR 51 (formerly US 223)
- Ohio State Route 112 (1927), now part of SR 104
- Ohio State Route 112 (1965-1973), a cancelled freeway in Toledo
