= New Middletown, Ohio =

- Village
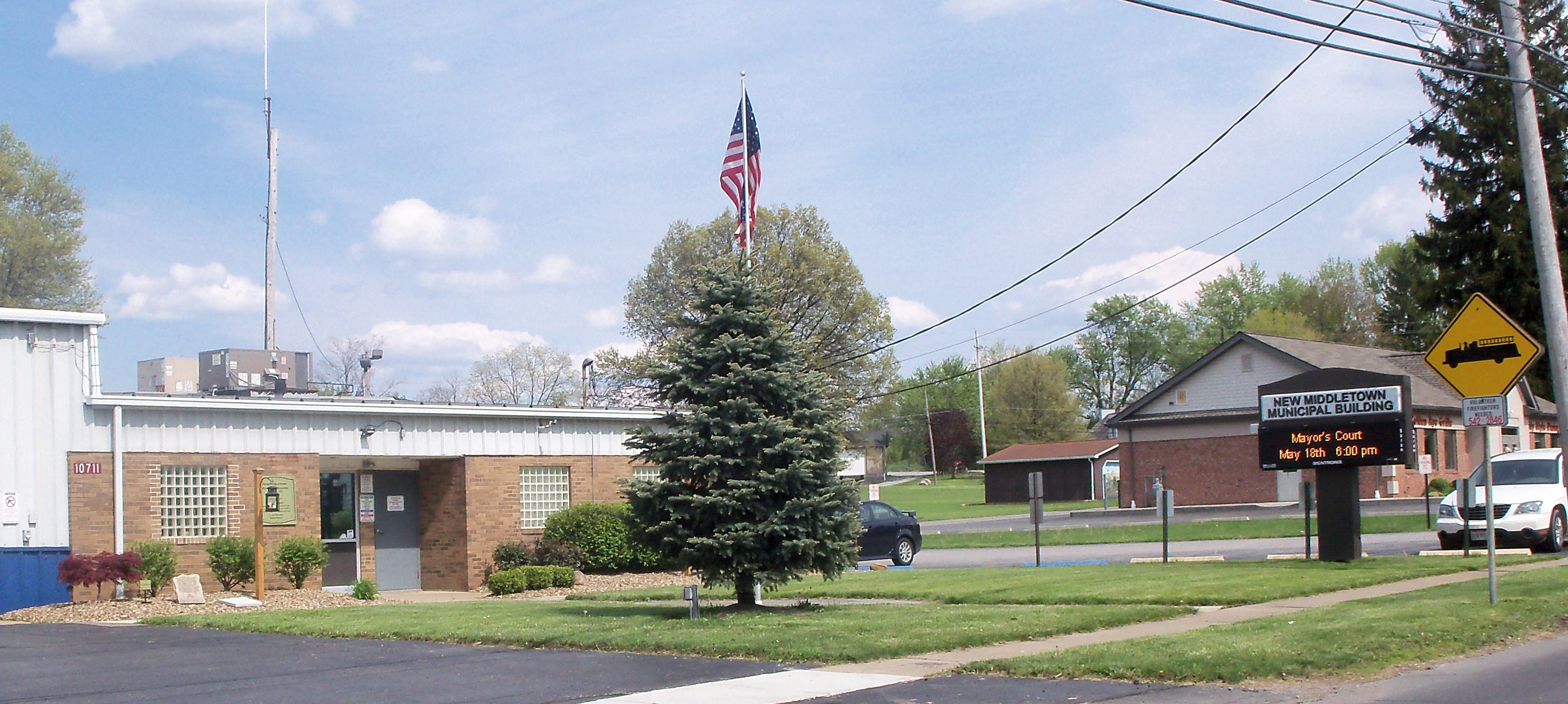
- New Middletown Municipal Building
- Interactive map of New Middletown, Ohio
- Location within Ohio Location within the United States
- Coordinates: 40°57′53″N 80°33′35″W
- Country: United States
- State: Ohio
- County: Mahoning
- Township: Springfield

Area
  - Total: 0.88 sq mi (2.27 km^{2})
  - Land: 0.87 sq mi (2.26 km^{2})
  - Water: 0 sq mi (0.00 km^{2})
- Elevation: 1,224 ft (373 m)

Population (2020)
  - Total: 1,507
  - Density: 1,725.9/sq mi (666.39/km^{2})
- Time zone: UTC-5 (Eastern (EST))
  - Summer (DST): UTC-4 (EDT)
- ZIP code: 44442
- Area codes: 234/330
- FIPS code: 39-55118
- GNIS feature ID: 1086567
- Website: newmiddletownoh.gov

New Middletown is a village in southeastern Mahoning County, Ohio, United States. The population was 1,507 at the 2020 census. It is part of the Youngstown–Warren metropolitan area.

== History ==
In 1825, New Middletown was founded by Samuel Moore and became an incorporated town in 1972. The village was most likely named after Middletown, Dauphin County, Pennsylvania, the former home of a share of the first settlers.

== Geography ==
According to the United States Census Bureau, the village has a total area of 0.87 square miles (2.25 km^{2}), all land.

== Demographics ==
Historical population
Census	Pop.	Note	%±
1870	147		—
1880	190		29.3%
1920	168		—
1930	205		22.0%
1940	227		10.7%
1950	264		16.3%
1960	500		89.4%
1970	1,664		232.8%
1980	2,195		31.9%
1990	1,912		−12.9%
2000	1,682		−12.0%
2010	1,621		−3.6%
2020	1,507		−7.0%
U.S. Decennial Census

=== 2010 census ===
As of the census of 2010, there were 1,621 people, 707 households, and 492 families living in the village. The population density was 1,863.2 inhabitants per square mile (719.4/km^{2}). There were 741 housing units at an average density of 851.7 per square mile (328.8/km^{2}). The racial makeup of the village was 98.8% White, 0.1% African American, 0.1% Asian, 0.4% from other races, and 0.6% from two or more races. Hispanic or Latino of any race were 1.7% of the population.

There were 707 households, of which 26.9% had children under the age of 18 living with them, 51.1% were married couples living together, 14.0% had a female householder with no husband present, 4.5% had a male householder with no wife present, and 30.4% were non-families. 28.0% of all households were made up of individuals, and 16% had someone living alone who was 65 years of age or older. The average household size was 2.29 and the average family size was 2.77.

The median age in the village was 47 years. 19.6% of residents were under the age of 18; 7.2% were between the ages of 18 and 24; 20.3% were from 25 to 44; 31.9% were from 45 to 64; and 21.3% were 65 years of age or older. The gender makeup of the village was 45.0% male and 55.0% female.

=== 2000 census ===
As of the census of 2000, there were 1,682 people, 690 households, and 503 families living in the village. The population density was 1,932.0 inhabitants per square mile (745.9/km^{2}). There were 727 housing units at an average density of 835.1 per square mile (322.4/km^{2}). The racial makeup of the village was 99.29% White, 0.06% African American, 0.12% Native American, and 0.54% from two or more races. Hispanic or Latino of any race were 0.77% of the population.

There were 690 households, out of which 28.7% had children under the age of 18 living with them, 58.3% were married couples living together, 12.2% had a female householder with no husband present, and 27.1% were non-families. 25.1% of all households were made up of individuals, and 12.0% had someone living alone who was 65 years of age or older. The average household size was 2.44 and the average family size was 2.92.

In the village, the population was spread out, with 22.2% under the age of 18, 7.7% from 18 to 24, 25.7% from 25 to 44, 27.6% from 45 to 64, and 16.8% who were 65 years of age or older. The median age was 41 years. For every 100 females there were 84.4 males. For every 100 females age 18 and over, there were 83.6 males.

The median income for a household in the village was $35,139, and the median income for a family was $42,500. Males had a median income of $37,125 versus $21,563 for females. The per capita income for the village was $19,741. About 6.5% of families and 7.7% of the population were below the poverty line, including 10.2% of those under age 18 and 12.1% of those age 65 or over.

== Education ==
Children in New Middletown are served by the public Springfield Local School District, which includes one elementary school, one intermediate school, and Springfield Local High School. The village is served by a branch of the Public Library of Youngstown and Mahoning County.
