= Pennsylvania Route 351 =

State highway in Pennsylvania, US

Pennsylvania Route 351
- PA 351 in red and PA 351 Truck in blue

Route information
- Maintained by PennDOT
- Length: 17.227 mi (27.724 km)

Major junctions
- West end: SR 617 at the Ohio state line near Petersburg, OH
- PA 551 in Enon Valley; PA 168 in New Galilee; I-76 / Penna Turnpike / I-376 Toll in Big Beaver; PA 18 in Koppel
- East end: PA 65 / PA 288 in Ellwood City

Location
- Country: United States
- State: Pennsylvania
- Counties: Lawrence, Beaver

Highway system
- Pennsylvania State Route System; Interstate; US; State; Scenic; Legislative
← PA 350	→ PA 352
← PA 450	PA 451	→ PA 452

Pennsylvania Route 351 (PA 351) is a 17.2-mile-long (27.7 km) state highway located in Lawrence and Beaver counties in Pennsylvania. The western terminus is at the Ohio border in Little Beaver Township (just south of S.N.P.J). The eastern terminus is at PA 65/PA 288 in Ellwood City. It is famous for its spotting of Raymond Robinson who would go on nighttime walks on the route making him an urban legend.

== Route description ==
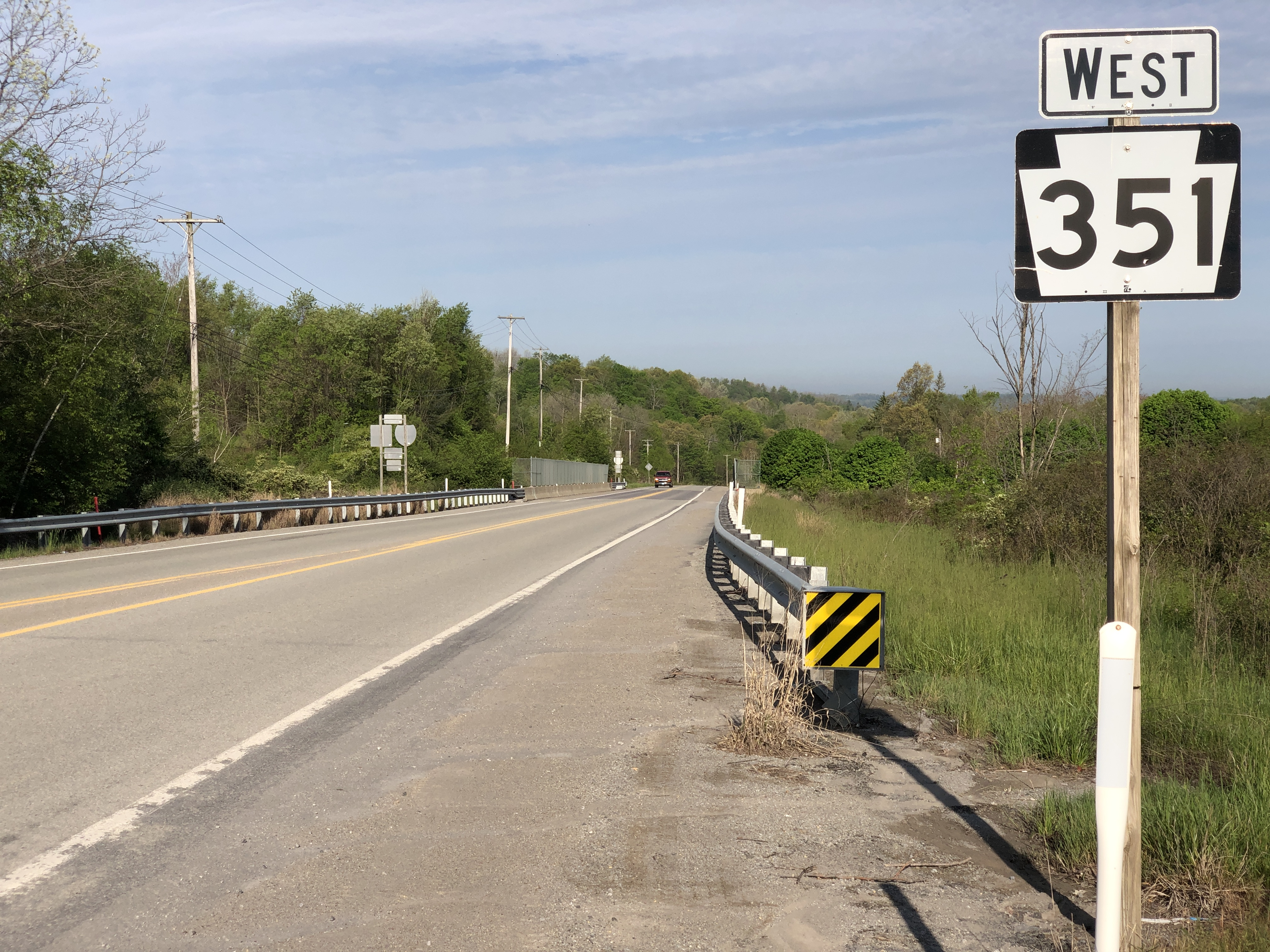
PA 351 westbound in Big Beaver

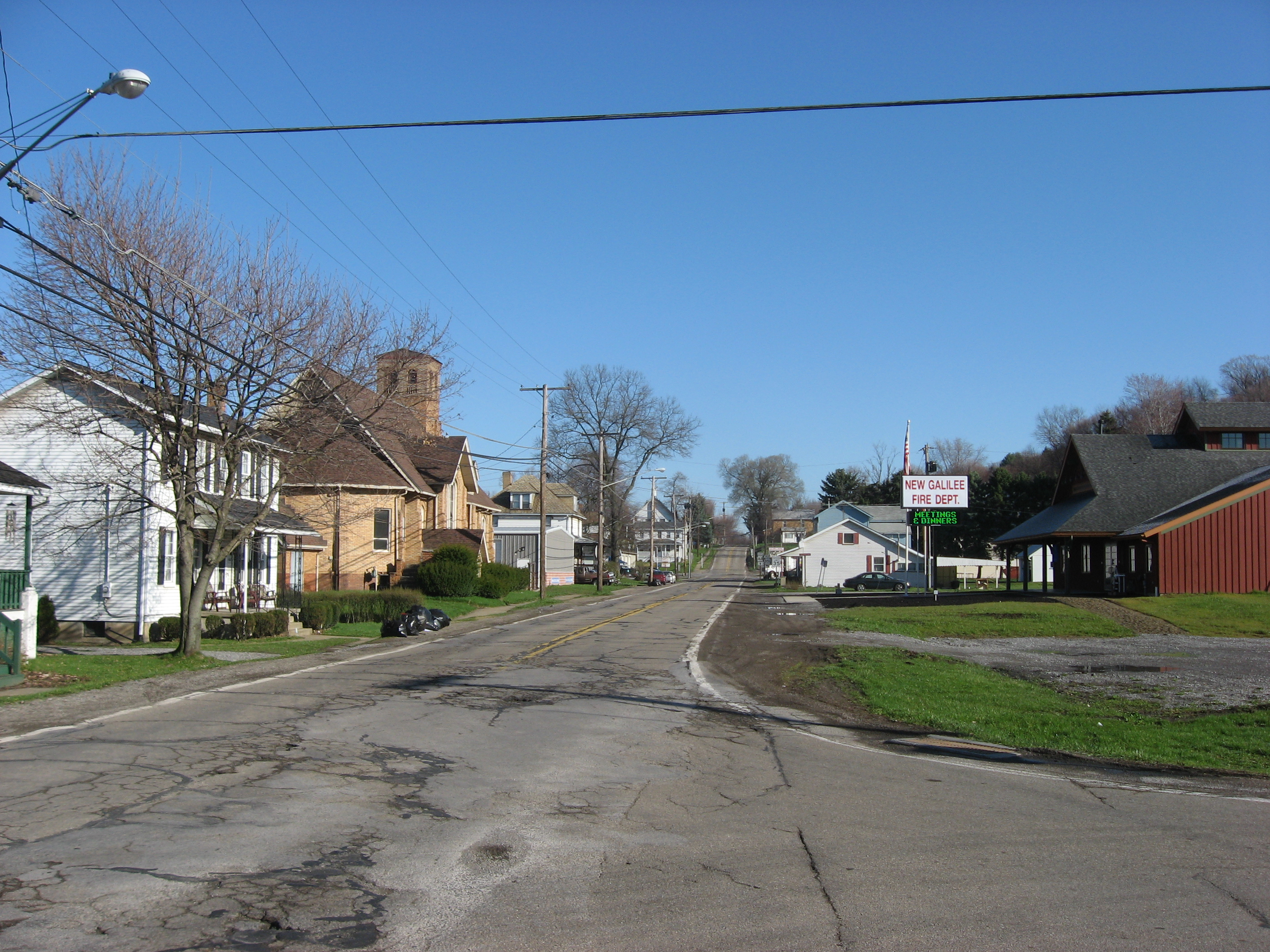
PA 351 westbound along the PA 168 concurrency in New Galilee

PA 351 begins at the Ohio border in Little Beaver Township, Lawrence County, where the road continues into Ohio as SR 617. From the state line, the route heads southeast on a two-lane undivided road, heading through open agricultural areas with some woods and homes. The road turns to the east-southeast and continues through more rural areas, crossing the North Fork Little Beaver Creek and reaching an intersection with PA 551. At this point, PA 351 forms a concurrency with PA 551, heading through more areas of farms, woods, and residences as it passes through Old Enon. The road heads into the borough of Enon Valley and becomes State Street, heading into residential areas and merging onto Main Street. PA 351 splits from PA 551 by turning east onto Vine Street, heading into agricultural areas and crossing back into Little Beaver Township, where it becomes an unnamed road. The road passes over Norfolk Southern's Fort Wayne Line and turns to the south, heading into wooded areas with some homes.

PA 351 enters Darlington Township in Beaver County and becomes Crescent Drive, turning southeast into a mix of farmland and woodland with some homes. The route crosses the North Fork Little Beaver Creek again and heads into more wooded areas, crossing into the borough of Big Beaver. The road turns south near more fields and heads into the borough of New Galilee, becoming Cleveland Drive and curving southwest past homes. PA 351 turns northeast onto Cleveland Street Extended before turning east onto Monroe Street, crossing Norfolk Southern's Fort Wayne Line. The route passes more homes before intersecting PA 168 and turning south to join that route on Centennial Avenue. PA 351 splits from PA 168 by turning east onto Fairlane Boulevard, crossing back into Big Beaver. The road turns to the northeast through woodland, coming to a bridge over the Pennsylvania Turnpike (Interstate 76, I-76). From here, the route turns northeast through a mix of farms and woods with some homes, crossing over I-376. A short distance later, PA 351 comes to an intersection with Shenango Road, which provides access to both I-76 and I-376. Past this, the road passes a few fields and homes before continuing southeast through more forested areas. The route turns east through wooded areas of homes before coming to a junction with PA 18. At this intersection, PA 351 crosses into the borough of Koppel and becomes Arthur Street, passing residences and businesses. The route crosses Norfolk Southern's Koppel Secondary railroad line and turns north onto 5th Avenue, heading past more development. The road curves northeast and passes near industry, crossing under a CSX railroad line before becoming unnamed and heading northeast through woodland. PA 351 comes to the Koppel Bridge that crosses over CSX's Pittsburgh Subdivision rail line before passing over the Beaver River into North Sewickley Township and heading over Norfolk Southern's Youngstown Line and another CSX railroad line. Past the bridge, the route turns north onto River Road and heads through wooded areas with some commercial development.

PA 351 heads into Wayne Township in Lawrence County and becomes West Lawrence Avenue, turning northeast and running through the residential community of Park Gate. The road heads into the borough of Ellwood City and turns to the east, becoming Lawrence Avenue and passing through business areas. Farther east, the route heads through the commercial downtown before turning south onto 4th Street. A block later, PA 351 turns east onto Crescent Avenue and passes homes before ending at PA 65/PA 288.

== History ==
Pennsylvania Route 451
- Location: New Galilee-Koppel
- Length: 4 mi (6.4 km)
- Existed: 1928–May 1937

PA 351 was signed in 1926, running from the Ohio state line to PA 451 New Galilee. In 1936, PA 451 was decommissioned, allowing PA 351 to extend its eastern segment to PA 18 in Koppel. Later that same year, PA 351 was extended one last time to its current eastern terminus at PA 65/PA 288 in Ellwood City.

== Major intersections ==
County	Location	mi	km	Destinations	Notes
Lawrence	Little Beaver Township	0.000	0.000	SR 617 west (Youngstown Pittsburgh Road) – Petersburg	Continuation into Ohio
Lawrence	Little Beaver Township	4.051	6.519	PA 551 north (Enon Road) – New Castle	Western end of PA 551 concurrency
Lawrence	Enon Valley	5.488	8.832	PA 551 south (Main Street)	Eastern end of PA 551 concurrency
Beaver	New Galilee	9.132	14.697	PA 168 north (Centennial Avenue)	Western end of PA 168 concurrency
Beaver	New Galilee	9.307	14.978	PA 168 south (Centennial Avenue)	Eastern end of PA 168 concurrency
Beaver	Big Beaver	11.495	18.499	To I-76 / Penna Turnpike / I-376 Toll	Access via Shenango Road
Beaver	Koppel	13.674	22.006	PA 18 (Big Beaver Boulevard) – New Castle, Beaver Falls	
Lawrence	Ellwood City	17.227	27.724	PA 65 / PA 288 (2nd Street) to PA 488 east	Eastern terminus
1.000 mi = 1.609 km; 1.000 km = 0.621 mi: Concurrency terminus

== Special Routes ==
=== Former Koppel truck route ===
Pennsylvania Route 351 Truck
- Location: Koppel
- Length: 16.4 mi (26.4 km)
- Existed: 2013–2019

Pennsylvania Route 351 Truck was a truck route that bypassed the weight-restricted Koppel Bridge that carried the route over the Beaver River and CSX and Norfolk Southern railroad lines in Koppel, on which trucks over 31 tons were prohibited. The route followed PA 18, PA 588, PA 65, and PA 65/288. PA 351 Truck was signed in 2013. The bridge was completely reconstructed in 2019, and the route was removed.

=== Ellwood City truck route ===
Pennsylvania Route 351 Truck
- Location: Ellwood City
- Length: 0.8 mi (1,300 m)
- Existed: 2013–present

Pennsylvania Route 351 Truck is a truck route that bypasses a portion of PA 351 in Ellwood City. The truck route follows the one-way pair of 5th Street north in the eastbound direction and Spring Avenue west and 6th Street south in the westbound direction before both directions head north along 5th Street and then east and south along PA 65/PA 288. The route was signed in 2013.

== See also ==
- Raymond Robinson
