= Old Homestead (Enon Valley, Pennsylvania) =

Historic house in Pennsylvania, United States

- U.S. National Register of Historic Places
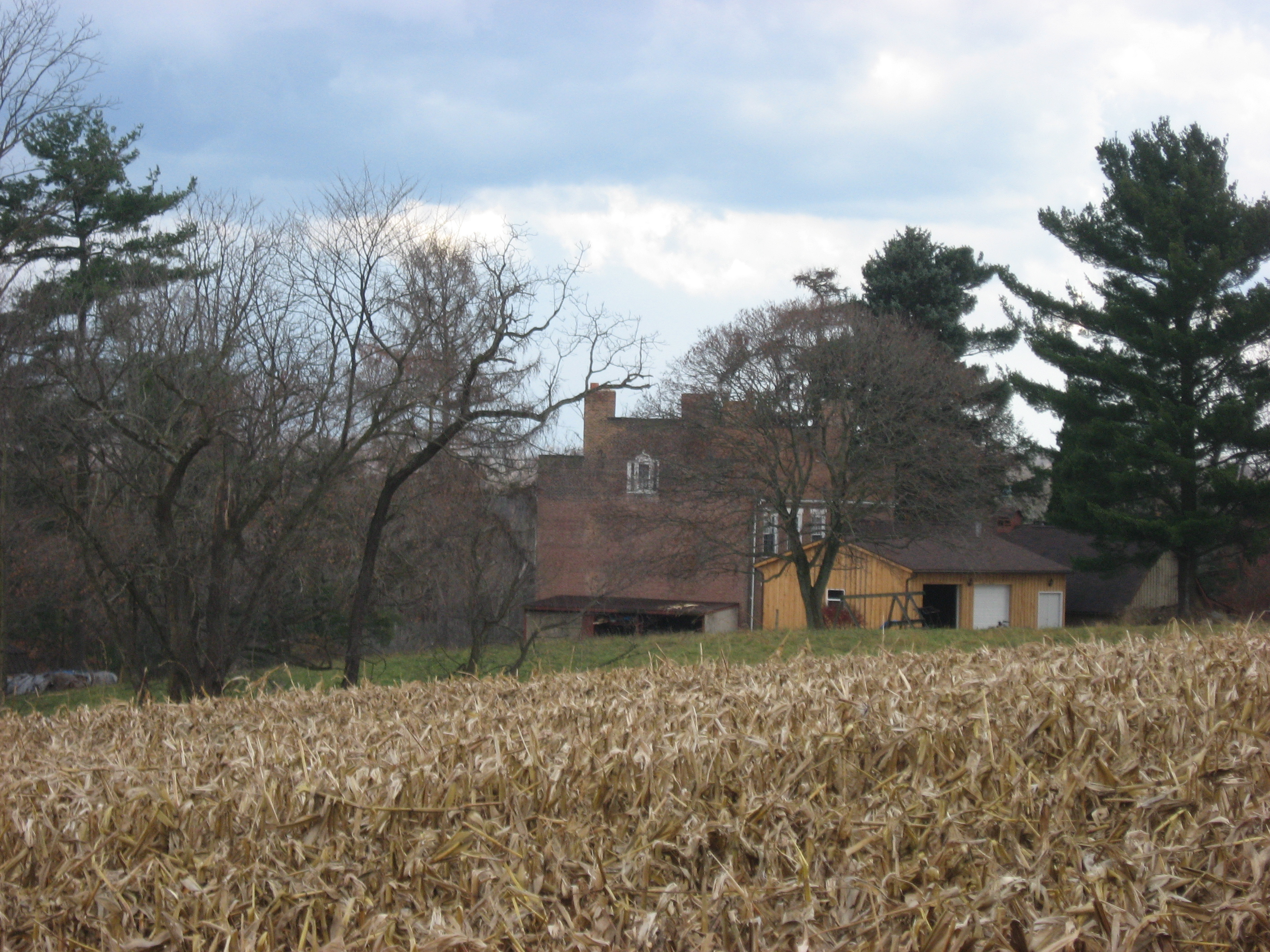
- Old Homestead, April 2009

- Location within Pennsylvania Location within the United States
- Location: Northwest of Enon Valley off Pennsylvania Route 351, Little Beaver Township, Pennsylvania
- Coordinates: 40°52′28″N 80°28′17″W
- Area: 3.7 acres (1.5 ha)
- Built: 1824-1825
- Architectural style: Federal
- NRHP reference No.: 80003542
- Added to NRHP: August 22, 1980

Old Homestead, also known as Pine Grove Farm and Honey Creek Farm, is a historic home located in Little Beaver Township, Lawrence County, Pennsylvania. It was built between 1824 and 1825, and is a 2 1/2-story, Federal-style dwelling with a gable roof. The building measures 39 feet, 4 inches, by 38 feet, 6 inches. It features unusual stepped front and rear walls.

It was added to the National Register of Historic Places in 1980.
