= Koppel, Pennsylvania =

Borough in Pennsylvania, US

- Borough
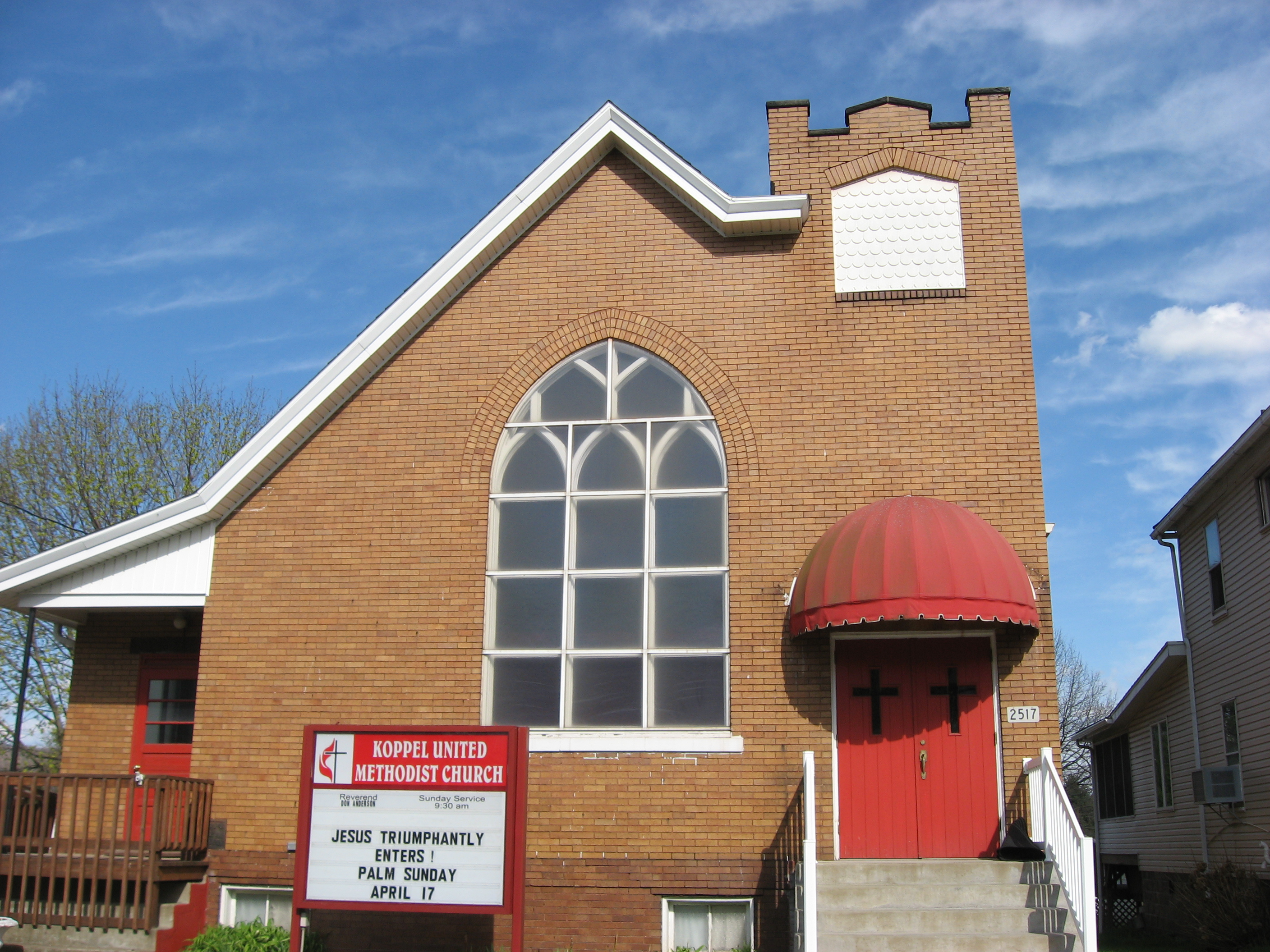
- Koppel United Methodist Church
- Interactive map of Koppel, Pennsylvania
- Location within Pennsylvania Location within the United States
- Coordinates: 40°50′00″N 80°19′25″W
- Country: United States
- State: Pennsylvania
- County: Beaver
- Incorporated: 1910

Government
  - Type: Borough Council

Area
  - Total: 0.57 sq mi (1.48 km^{2})
  - Land: 0.54 sq mi (1.39 km^{2})
  - Water: 0.035 sq mi (0.09 km^{2})
- Elevation: 906 ft (276 m)

Population (2020)
  - Total: 712
  - Density: 1,325/sq mi (511.6/km^{2})
- Time zone: UTC-5 (Eastern (EST))
  - Summer (DST): UTC-4 (EDT)
- Zip code: 16136
- Area code: 724
- FIPS code: 42-40400
- Website: https://www.koppelborough.gov/

Koppel is a borough in northern Beaver County, Pennsylvania, United States. The population was 712 at the 2020 census. It is part of the Pittsburgh metropolitan area.

== History ==
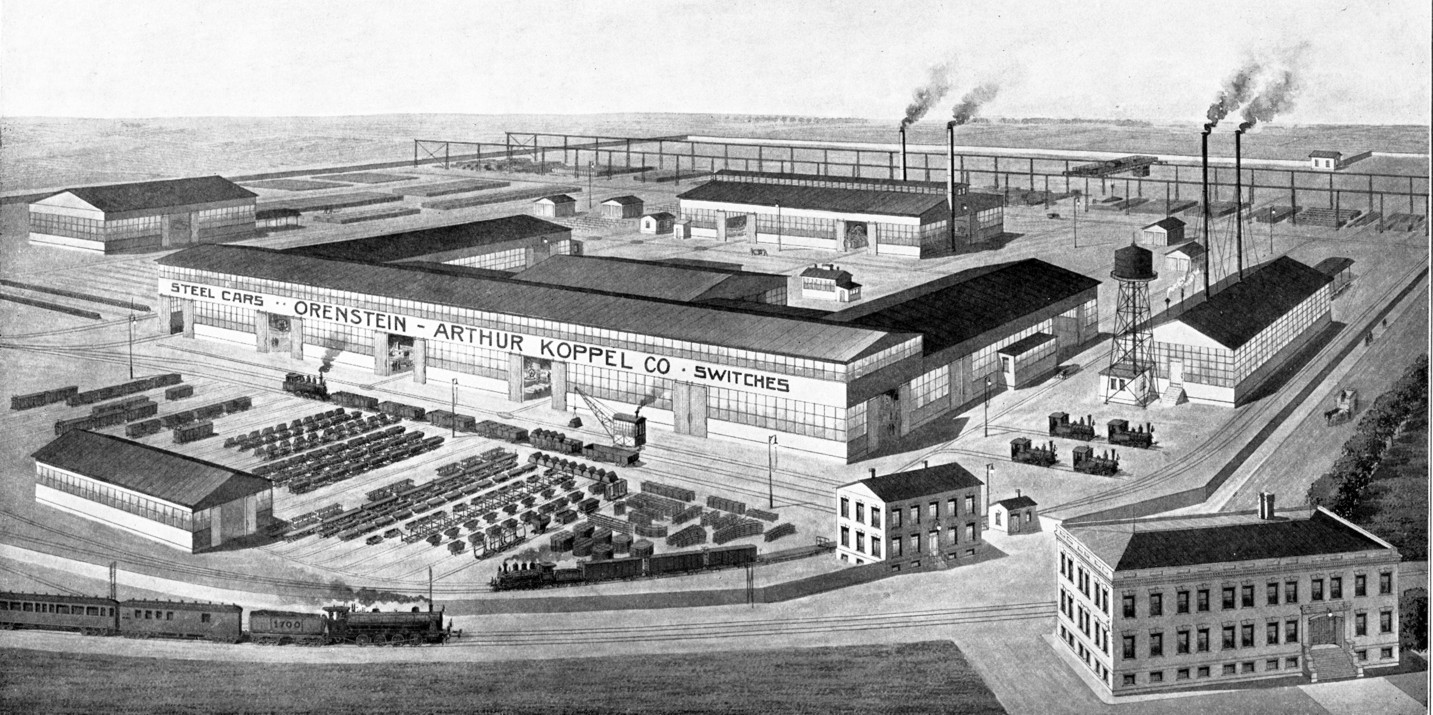
Orenstein & Koppel factory c. 1913.

Koppel was named after Arthur Koppel of Orenstein & Koppel, which was a German manufacturing company that owned 558 acres of land in nearby Big Beaver Township by 1907. In 1912, Koppel was established as a borough. The next year, Orenstein & Koppel donated land to the new borough for school and municipal buildings. After most of the town was confiscated by the Office of Alien Property Custodian from Orenstein & Koppel in 1917, much of the property was sold to the Koppel Industrial and Equipment Company. Other manufacturing companies had a presence in Koppel—the Pressed Steel Car Company from 1919 to 1937 and Babcock & Wilcox during the 1950s.

== Geography ==
Koppel is located in northern Beaver County at 40°50′0″N 80°19′25″W (40.833402, −80.323675) along the west bank of the Beaver River.

Pennsylvania Route 18 (Big Beaver Boulevard) follows the western border of the borough, leading south 6 miles (10 km) to Beaver Falls and north 14 miles (23 km) to New Castle. Pennsylvania Route 351 crosses Route 18 and runs through the center of Koppel, leading northeast 3 miles (5 km) to Ellwood City and west 2.5 miles (4.0 km) to Interstate 376 at the Pennsylvania Turnpike.

According to the United States Census Bureau, Koppel has a total area of 0.58 square miles (1.5 km^{2}), of which 0.54 square miles (1.4 km^{2}) is land and 0.039 square miles (0.1 km^{2}), or 6.14%, is water.

== Surrounding neighborhoods ==
Koppel has only two borders, including Big Beaver to the north, south and west, and North Sewickley Township to the east.

== Demographics ==
Historical population
Census	Pop.	Note	%±
1920	762		—
1930	1,057		38.7%
1940	1,064		0.7%
1950	1,137		6.9%
1960	1,389		22.2%
1970	1,312		−5.5%
1980	1,146		−12.7%
1990	1,024		−10.6%
2000	856		−16.4%
2010	762		−11.0%
2020	712		−6.6%
2021 (est.)	703	▼	−1.3%

As of the 2000 census, there were 856 people, 373 households, and 246 families residing in the borough. The population density was 1,619.0 inhabitants per square mile (625.1/km^{2}). There were 409 housing units at an average density of 773.6 per square mile (298.7/km^{2}). The racial makeup of the borough was 98.25% White, 0.47% African American, and 1.29% from two or more races. Hispanic or Latino of any race were 0.35% of the population.

There were 373 households, out of which 20.4% had children under the age of 18 living with them, 48.0% were married couples living together, 13.9% had a female householder with no husband present, and 33.8% were non-families. 30.3% of all households were made up of individuals, and 18.0% had someone living alone who was 65 years of age or older. The average household size was 2.29 and the average family size was 2.83.

In the borough the population was spread out, with 18.7% under the age of 18, 6.3% from 18 to 24, 27.1% from 25 to 44, 22.8% from 45 to 64, and 25.1% who were 65 years of age or older. The median age was 44 years. For every 100 females, there were 90.6 males. For every 100 females age 18 and over, there were 83.2 males.

The median income for a household in the borough was $32,059, and the median income for a family was $36,250. Males had a median income of $33,375 versus $22,292 for females. The per capita income for the borough was $17,101. About 3.9% of families and 6.8% of the population were below the poverty line, including 10.8% of those under age 18 and 7.0% of those age 65 or over.

== Education ==
Children in Koppel are served by the Big Beaver Falls Area School District. The current schools serving Koppel are:

- Big Beaver Elementary School – grades K–5
- Beaver Falls Middle School – grades 6–8
- Beaver Falls High School – grades 9–12

== Notable person ==
- Raymond "Charlie No-Face" Robinson
