= Ohio State Route 616 =

State highway in northeastern Ohio, US

State Route 616

Route information
- Maintained by ODOT
- Length: 10.47 mi (16.85 km)
- Existed: 1939–present

Major junctions
- South end: SR 170 in Poland
- US 224 in Poland; US 422 in Youngstown
- North end: US 62 / SR 7 / SR 304 in Hubbard

Location
- Country: United States
- State: Ohio
- Counties: Mahoning, Trumbull

Highway system
- Ohio State Highway System; Interstate; US; State; Scenic
← SR 615	→ SR 617

State Route 616 (SR 616) is a north–south state highway in the northeastern portion of the U.S. state of Ohio. The southern terminus of SR 616 is at a signalized intersection with SR 170 immediately south of US 224 in Poland. The northern terminus of the state highway is at a signalized intersection that doubles as the eastern end of the concurrency of US 62, SR 7 and SR 304 in Hubbard.

== Route description ==
Along its path, SR 616 passes through northeastern Mahoning County and southeastern Trumbull County. No stretch of SR 616 is included within the National Highway System, a network of highways deemed most vital for the nation's economy, mobility and defense.

The section of SR 616 between US Route 422 and US Route 224, is considered a "principal arterial" highway, and is a "MAP-21" (Moving Ahead for Progress in the 21st century), to be potentially included within the NHS.

== History ==
SR 616 was established in 1939. From its inception, it has maintained the same Poland–Hubbard alignment that it utilizes today. There have been no changes of major significance to the routing of SR 616 since it was designated.

== Major intersections ==
County	Location	mi	km	Destinations	Notes
Mahoning	Poland	0.00	0.00	SR 170 (South Main Street)	
Mahoning	Poland	0.03	0.048	US 224 (West McKinley Way)	
Mahoning	Struthers	3.18	5.12	SR 289 (Broad Street) – Campbell, Lowellville	
Mahoning	Youngstown	5.92	9.53	US 422 (McCartney Road)	
Trumbull	Hubbard	10.47	16.85	US 62 / SR 7 / SR 304 (Liberty Street / Main Street)	
1.000 mi = 1.609 km; 1.000 km = 0.621 mi
