= Brentwood Lake, Ohio =

Unincorporated community in Ohio, U.S.

Coordinates: 41°18′58″N 82°04′40″W

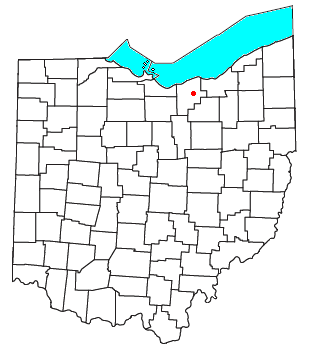
Location of Brentwood Lake, Ohio

Brentwood Lake is an unincorporated community in far eastern Carlisle Township, Lorain County, Ohio, United States. It lies at the intersection of State Routes 57 and 82 midway between Elyria and Grafton.

Located at the center of the planned community was a small lake, compliments of an earthen dam from which a small stream flows to the East Branch Black River that runs just to the west of the community. The earthen dam was dismantled in 2010 for safety reasons and today there is only a small stream without a lake.

Alfred M. Moen, the inventor of the Moen faucet, was a past resident of the lakeside community.
