= Petersburg, Mahoning County, Ohio =

Petersburg, Ohio
- Census-designated place
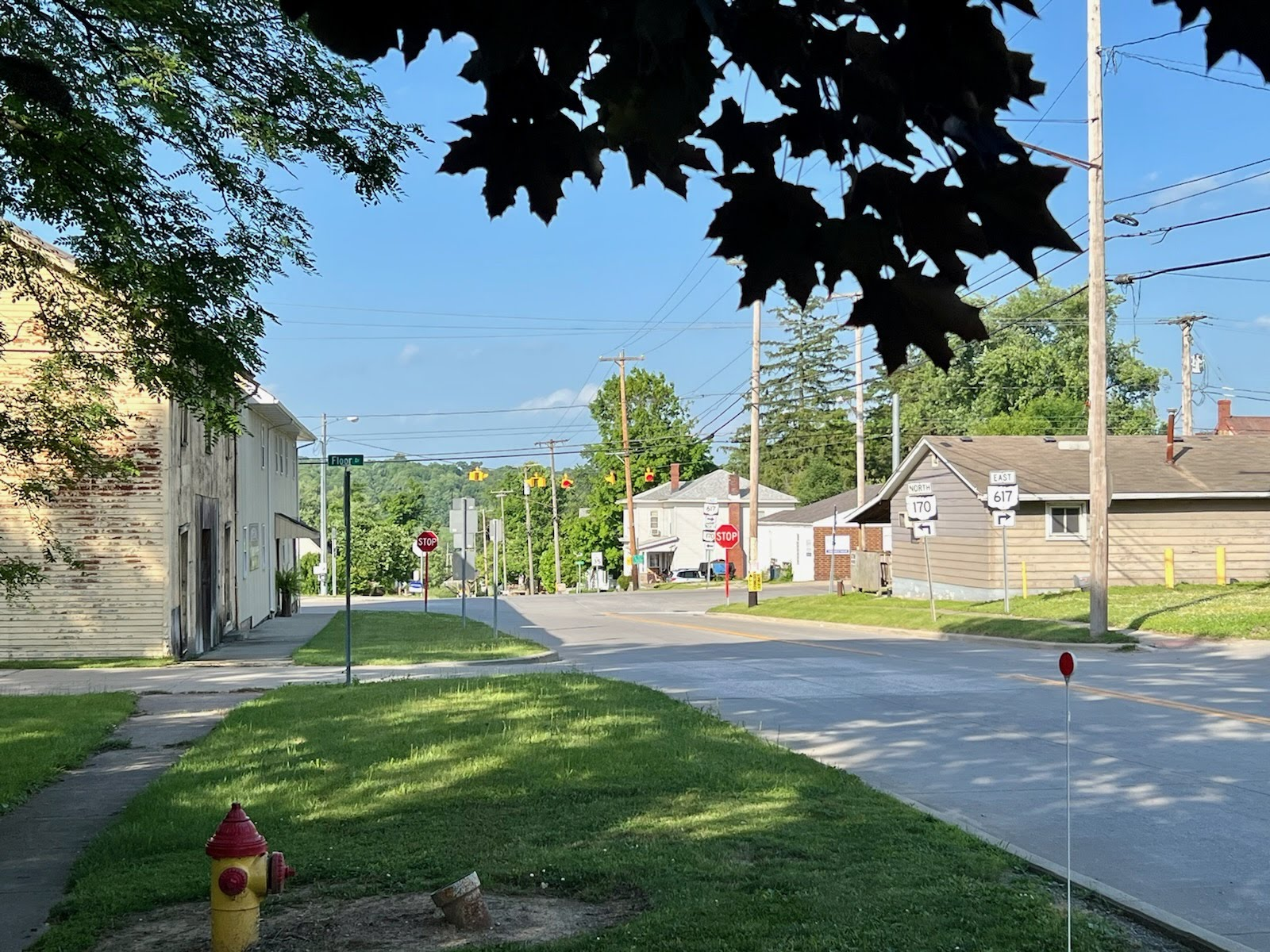
- Intersection of Ohio State Routes 170 and 617
- Nickname: "Gateway to Ohio"
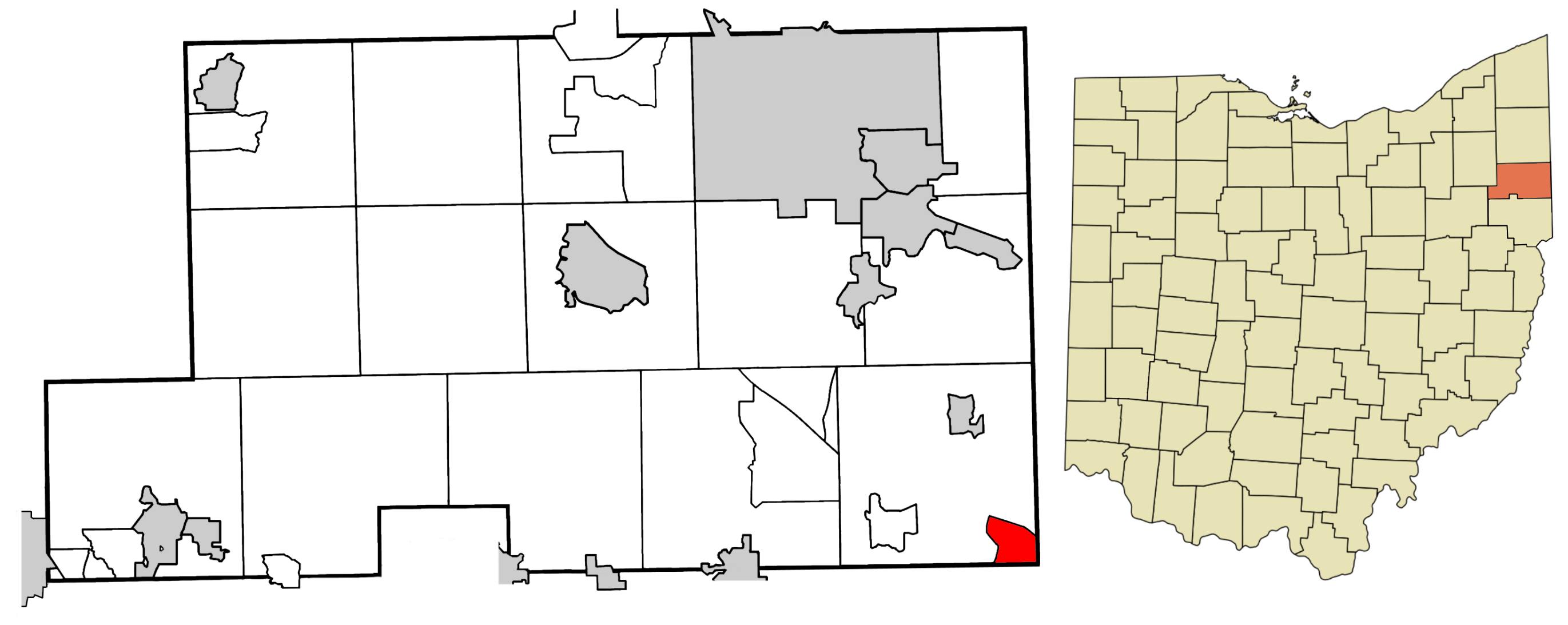
- Location of Petersburg in Mahoning County, Ohio.

- Location within Ohio Location within the United States
- Coordinates: 40°54′34″N 80°31′59″W
- Country: United States
- State: Ohio
- County: Mahoning
- Township: Springfield

Area
  - Total: 1.53 sq mi (3.95 km^{2})
  - Land: 1.52 sq mi (3.93 km^{2})
  - Water: 0.0077 sq mi (0.02 km^{2})
- Elevation: 1,089 ft (332 m)

Population (2020)
  - Total: 405
- Time zone: UTC-5 (Eastern (EST))
  - Summer (DST): UTC-4 (EDT)
- ZIP code: 44454
- Area codes: 330, 234
- GNIS feature ID: 2812828

Petersburg is a small unincorporated community and census-designated place in Springfield Township, Mahoning County, Ohio, United States. The population was 405 at the 2020 census. It is part of the Youngstown–Warren metropolitan area.

Petersburg is located at the intersection of Ohio State Routes 170 and 617. It is skirted by Interstate 76, the far eastern end of the Ohio Turnpike. The community was founded in the 1790s by German immigrants from Pennsylvania, which it neighbors.

== History ==
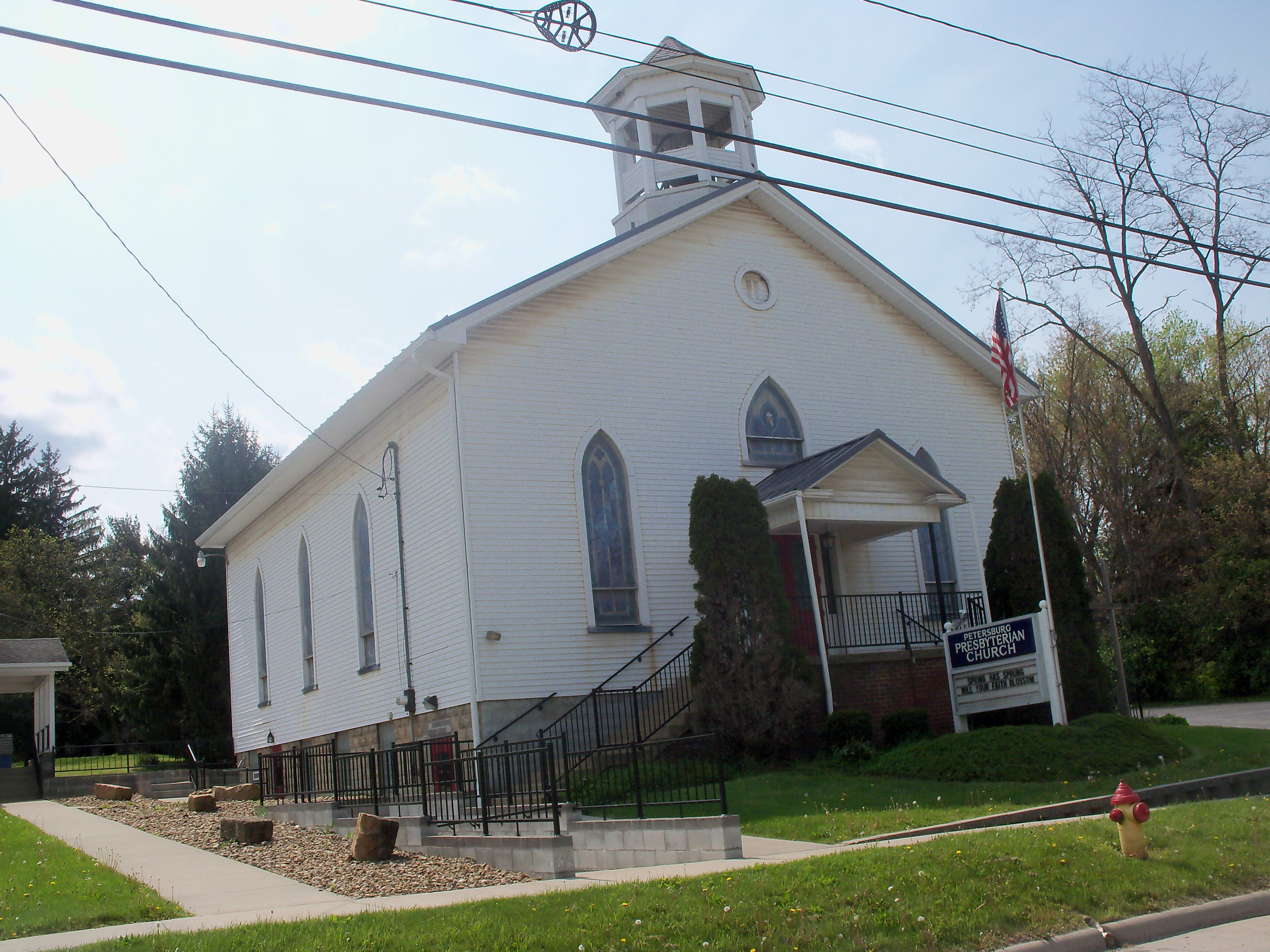
Petersburg Presbyterian Church

Petersburg was platted around 1805 by Peter Musser, and named for him. The post office was originally called Musser's Mill. The Mussers Mills post office was established in 1807, the name was changed to Petersburgh in 1819, and renamed again Petersburg in 1893.

The building that was once used as the Petersburg Inn burned to the ground in 1961 and was believed to have been built around 1800. A few other significant historical buildings in the community were St. John's Lutheran Church and the Petersburg Presbyterian Church that were founded by early settlers of that area including the following families: Wallace, Musser, Smith and Kneasel.

== Education ==
Children in Petersburg are served by the public Springfield Local School District, which includes one elementary school, one intermediate school, and Springfield Local High School.
