= Little Beaver Township, Lawrence County, Pennsylvania =

Township in Pennsylvania, US

Coordinates: 40°53′20″N 80°26′03″W

Little Beaver Township
- Township
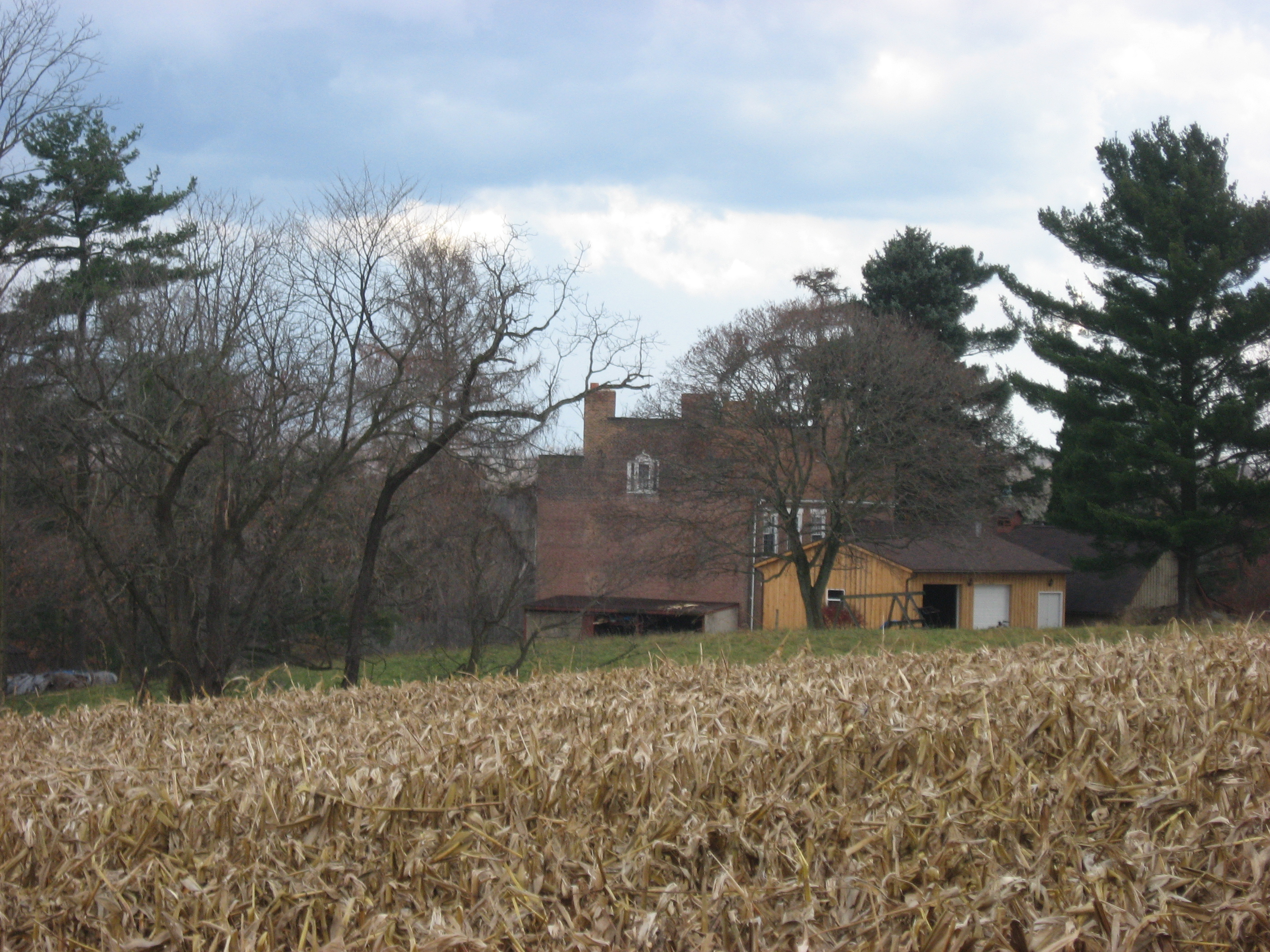
- Old Homestead, a historic site in the township

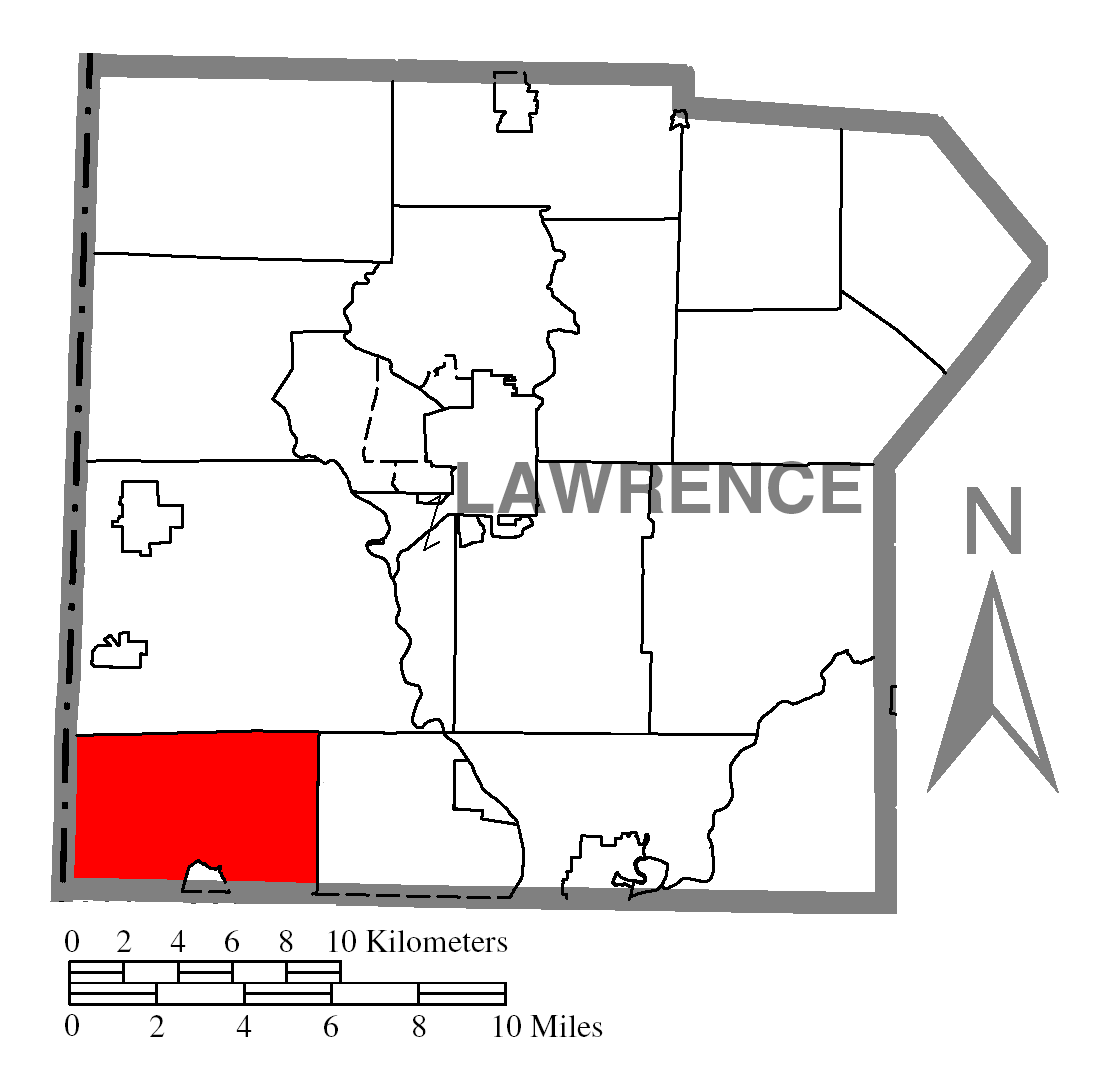
- Location of Little Beaver Township in Lawrence County

- Location of Lawrence County in Pennsylvania
- Country: United States
- State: Pennsylvania
- County: Lawrence
- Established: 1801

Area
  - Total: 20.50 sq mi (53.10 km^{2})
  - Land: 20.37 sq mi (52.76 km^{2})
  - Water: 0.13 sq mi (0.34 km^{2})
- Highest elevation (north of Mount Air): 1,240 ft (380 m)
- Lowest elevation (North Fork Little Beaver Creek): 940 ft (290 m)

Population (2020)
  - Total: 1,227
  - Estimate (2022): 1,208
  - Density: 66.3/sq mi (25.59/km^{2})
- Time zone: UTC-4 (EST)
  - Summer (DST): UTC-5 (EDT)
- Area code: 724
- FIPS code: 42-073-43824

Historical population
Census	Pop.	Note	%±
2000	1,310		—
2010	1,411		7.7%
2020	1,227		−13.0%
2022 (est.)	1,208		−1.5%

Little Beaver Township is a township in Lawrence County, Pennsylvania, United States. The population was 1,227 at the time of the 2020 census, a decline from the figure of 1,411 tabulated in 2010.

== History ==
Little Beaver Township was originally incorporated in 1801 as part of Beaver County, and in 1849, joined the newly created Lawrence County.

Old Homestead was listed on the National Register of Historic Places in 1980.

== Geography ==
According to the United States Census Bureau, the township has a total area of 20.5 square miles (53 km^{2}), of which 20.4 square miles (53 km^{2}) is land and 0.1 square miles (0.26 km^{2}), or 0.63%, is water.

The western border of the township is the Ohio state line.

The township surrounds the borough of Enon Valley to its North, West, and East. Unincorporated communities in the township include Old Enon, Newburg, and Mount Air.

== Demographics ==
As of the census of 2000, there were 1,310 people, 451 households, and 362 families residing in the township.

The population density was 64.1 inhabitants per square mile (24.7/km^{2}). There were 502 housing units at an average density of 24.6/sq mi (9.5/km^{2}).

The racial makeup of the township was 99.39% White, 0.23% African American, and 0.38% from two or more races. Hispanic or Latino of any race were 0.61% of the population.

There were 451 households, out of which 38.4% had children under the age of 18 living with them; 68.5% were married couples living together, 8.2% had a female householder with no husband present, and 19.7% were non-families. 16.2% of all households were made up of individuals, and 6.2% had someone living alone who was 65 years of age or older.

The average household size was 2.90 and the average family size was 3.28.

In the township the population was spread out, with 30.3% under the age of 18, 6.4% from 18 to 24, 30.5% from 25 to 44, 23.0% from 45 to 64, and 9.8% who were 65 years of age or older. The median age was 34 years.

For every 100 females there were 95.5 males. For every 100 females who were aged 18 and over, there were 99.8 males.

The median income for a household in the township was $35,368, and the median income for a family was $40,795. Males had a median income of $33,929 compared with that of $21,023 for females.

The per capita income for the township was $14,689.

Roughly 13.8% of families and 15.4% of the population were below the poverty line, including 24.7% of those who were under the age of 18 and 4.5% of those who were aged 65 or older.

== Education ==
The Mohawk Area School District serves the township.

== Transportation ==
The Pennsylvania Turnpike travels east–west through Northern and Eastern Little Beaver Township.

=== Major roads and highways ===
- I-76 / Penna Turnpike
- PA 351
- PA 551
