= Brock, Ohio =

Unincorporated community in Ohio, U.S.

Coordinates: 40°15′59″N 84°33′31″W

Brock is an unincorporated community in Darke County, in the U.S. state of Ohio.

== History ==
A post office called Brock was established in 1850, and remained in operation until 1906. In addition to the post office, Brock had its own schoolhouse, church, and town hall.
