= New Springfield, Ohio =

- Census-designated place
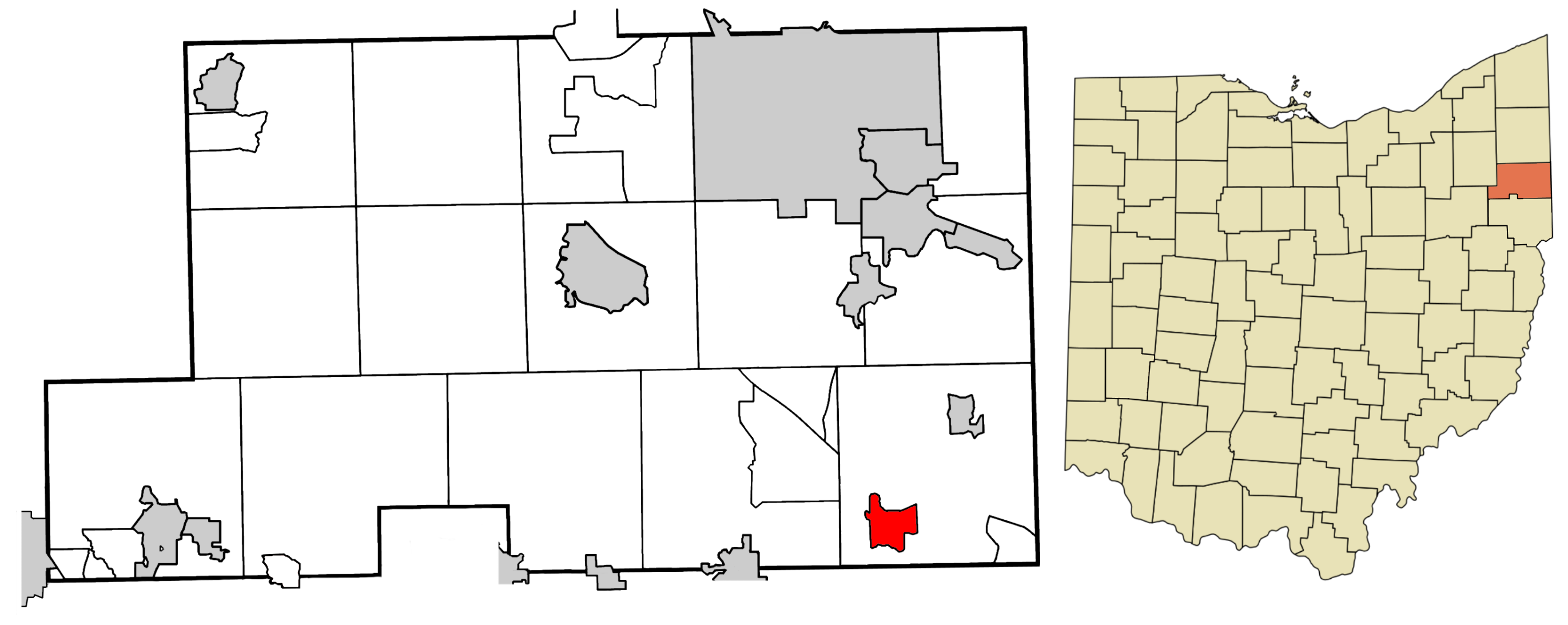
- Location of New Springfield in Mahoning County, Ohio.

- Location within Ohio Location within the United States
- Coordinates: 40°55′06″N 80°36′11″W
- Country: United States
- State: Ohio
- County: Mahoning
- Township: Springfield

Area
  - Total: 1.60 sq mi (4.14 km^{2})
  - Land: 1.58 sq mi (4.09 km^{2})
  - Water: 0.019 sq mi (0.05 km^{2})
- Elevation: 1,161 ft (354 m)

Population (2020)
  - Total: 579
  - Density: 366.4/sq mi (141.48/km^{2})
- Time zone: UTC-5 (Eastern (EST))
  - Summer (DST): UTC-4 (EDT)
- ZIP code: 44443
- Area codes: 330, 234
- FIPS code: 39-55524
- GNIS feature ID: 2812830
- School District: Springfield Local School District

New Springfield is an unincorporated community and census-designated place in Springfield Township, Mahoning County, Ohio, United States. The population was 579 at the 2020 census. It is part of the Youngstown–Warren metropolitan area. It lies at the intersection of State Routes 165 and 617.

== History ==
New Springfield was platted in the early 1820s. A post office called New Springfield has been in operation since 1828, which bears the ZIP code 44443.

== Demographics ==
Historical population
| Census | Pop. | Note | %± |
|---|---|---|---|
| 2020 | 579 | | — |
U.S. Decennial Census

== Education ==
Children in New Springfield are served by the public Springfield Local School District, which includes one elementary school, one intermediate school, and Springfield Local High School.
