= Isleta, Ohio =

Unincorporated community in Ohio, U.S.

Coordinates: 40°16′12″N 81°40′17″W

Isleta is an unincorporated community in Coshocton County, in the U.S. state of Ohio.

== History ==
A post office called White Eyes was established in 1815, the name was changed to Isleta in 1892, and the post office closed in 1955. According to tradition, Isleta was named for the love interest of a railroad official.
