= Kelloggsville, Ohio =

- Unincorporated community
- Location within Ohio Location within the United States
- Coordinates: 41°51′24″N 80°37′02″W
- Country: United States
- State: Ohio
- County: Ashtabula
- Township: Monroe
- Elevation: 846 ft (258 m)
- Time zone: UTC-5 (Eastern (EST))
  - Summer (DST): UTC-4 (EDT)
- Area code: 440
- GNIS feature ID: 1065467

Kelloggsville is an unincorporated community in Monroe Township, Ashtabula County, Ohio, United States.

== History ==
The first settlement at Kelloggsville was made in the early 19th century. Kelloggsville owes its name to a Mr. Kellogg, an early settler.
