= Cynthiana, Ohio =

- CDP
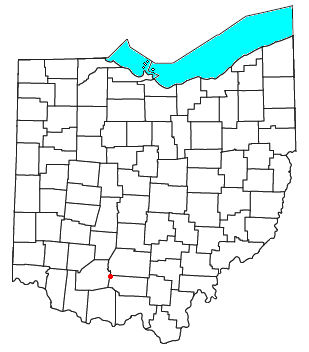
- Location of Cynthiana, Ohio
- Country: United States
- State: Ohio
- County: Pike
- Township: Perry
- Elevation: 971 ft (296 m)

Population (2020)
  - Total: 57
- Time zone: UTC-5 (Eastern (EST))
  - Summer (DST): UTC-4 (EDT)
- GNIS feature ID: 2628880

Cynthiana is a census-designated place in northwestern Perry Township, Pike County, Ohio, United States. Cynthiana no longer has a post office and the mailing address has been changed to Bainbridge, OH 45612. It lies along State Route 41. The population was 57 at the 2020 census.

== Gallery ==
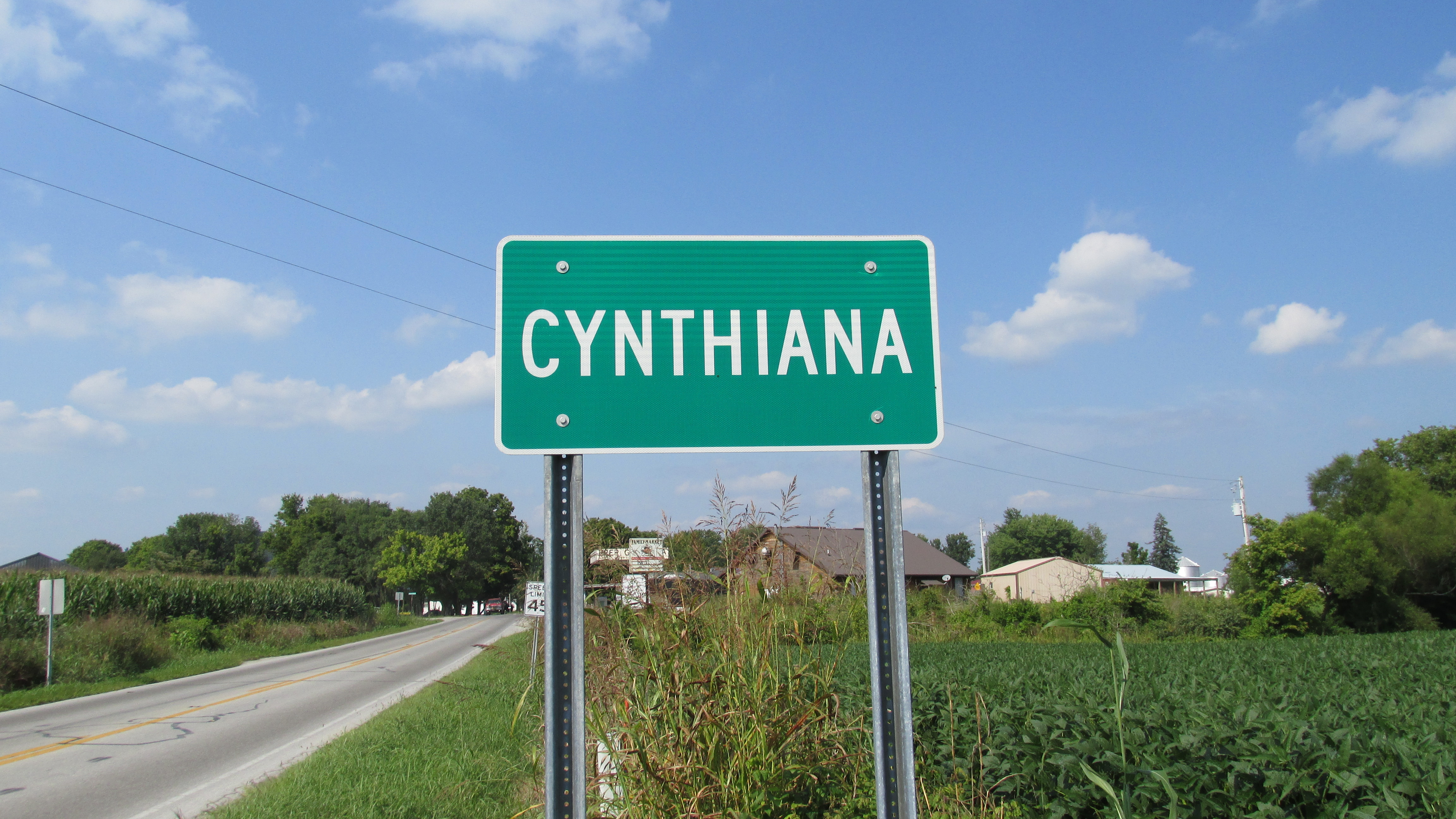
Cynthiana community sign.

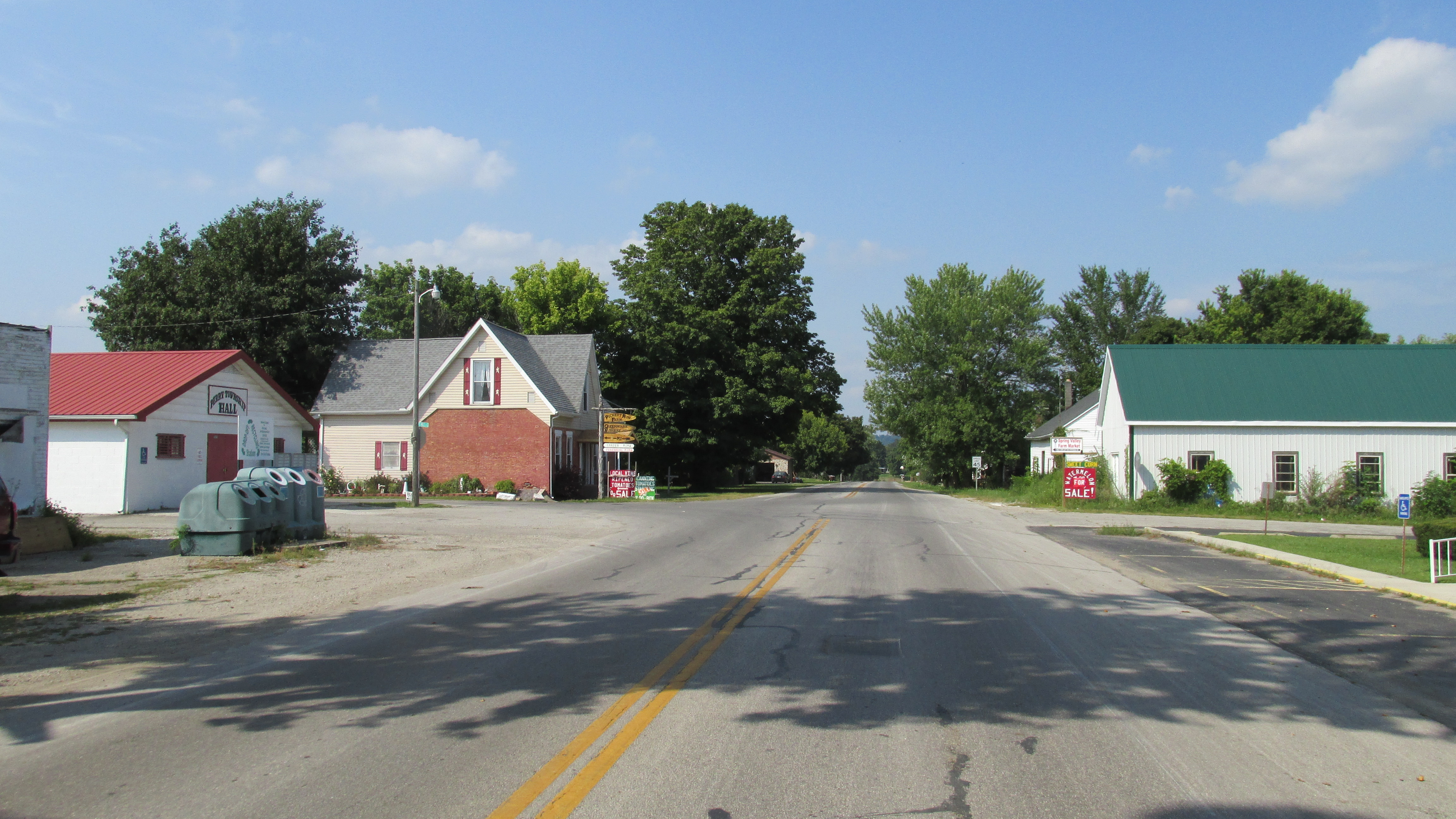
Looking north on Ohio Highway 41 in Cynthiana.
