= Springfield Local High School (New Middletown, Ohio) =

Coordinates: 40°57′19″N 80°32′53″W

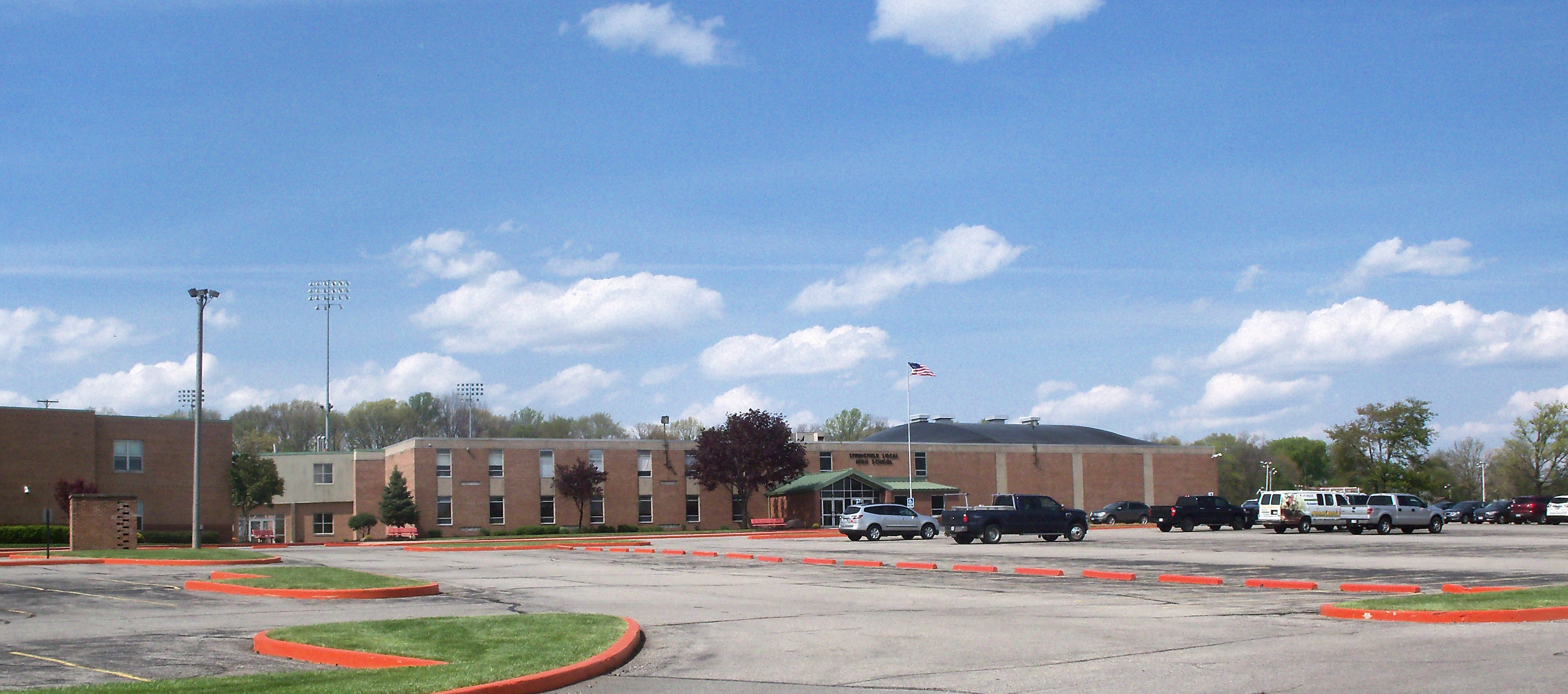

Location
- 11335 Youngstown-Pittsburgh Rd; New Middletown, Ohio 44442; United States

Information
- Type: Public, Coeducational high school
- Established: 1917
- School district: Springfield Local School District
- Superintendent: Rachael Smith
- CEEB code: 364100
- Teaching staff: 21.00 (FTE)
- Grades: 9-12
- Student to teacher ratio: 11.81
- Campus type: Fringe Rural
- Colors: Orange and Black
- Athletics conference: Mahoning Valley Athletic Conference
- Team name: Tigers
- Athletic Director: Bob Beam
- Website: slhs.springfieldlocal.us

Springfield Local High School is a public high school in New Middletown, Ohio, It is the only high school in the Springfield Local School District. Their nickname is the Tigers in the Ohio High School Athletic Association as a member of the Mahoning Valley Athletic Conference.

== Athletics ==
Springfield Local High School currently offers:

- Baseball
- Basketball
- Cheerleading
- Golf
- Girls Soccer
- Football
- Softball
- Swimming
- Track and field
- Volleyball

== Notable alumni ==
Beau Brungard - college football quarterback for the Youngstown State Penguins
