= National Register of Historic Places listings in Lawrence County, Pennsylvania =

Location of Lawrence County in Pennsylvania

This is a list of the National Register of Historic Places listings in Lawrence County, Pennsylvania.

This is intended to be a complete list of the properties and districts on National Register of Historic Places in Lawrence County, Pennsylvania, United States. The locations of National Register properties and districts for which the latitude and longitude coordinates are included below, may be seen in a map.

There are 10 properties and districts listed on the National Register in the county.

This National Park Service list is complete through NPS recent listings posted January 23, 2026.

== Current listings ==
	Name on the Register	Image	Date listed	Location	City or town	Description
1	Banks Covered Bridge	Banks Covered Bridge	June 27, 1980 (#80003543)	Southeast of New Wilmington on Township 476; 41°05′26″N 80°17′10″W	Wilmington Township	
2	Lawrence County Courthouse	Lawrence County Courthouse	December 15, 1978 (#78002419)	Court Street; 40°59′54″N 80°20′22″W	New Castle	
3	McClelland Homestead	McClelland Homestead	May 17, 1989 (#89000359)	McClelland Road northeast of Bessemer; 40°59′37″N 80°27′03″W	North Beaver Township	
4	McConnell's Mill Covered Bridge	McConnell's Mill Covered Bridge	June 27, 1980 (#80003544)	North of Portersville and south of Rose Point on Township 415; 40°57′10″N 80°10′14″W	Slippery Rock Township	
5	New Castle Armory	New Castle Armory	May 9, 1991 (#91000516)	820 Frank Avenue; 40°58′45″N 80°19′30″W	Shenango Township	
6	New Castle Hospital		September 16, 2022 (#100008138)	1000 South Mercer Street; 40°59′19″N 80°20′42″W	New Castle	
7	North Hill Historic District	North Hill Historic District	February 18, 2000 (#00000056)	Roughly Delaware, Neshannock, Hill Crest and Fairmont Avenues, and Crescent, Falls, Beaver, Jefferson and Mercer Streets; 41°00′43″N 80°20′28″W	New Castle	
8	Old Homestead	Old Homestead	August 22, 1980 (#80003542)	Northwest of Enon Valley off Pennsylvania Route 351; 40°52′28″N 80°28′17″W	Little Beaver Township	
9	S. R. Thompson House	S. R. Thompson House	March 7, 1985 (#85000467)	400 Market Street; 41°07′07″N 80°20′01″W	New Wilmington	
10	Scottish Rite Cathedral	Scottish Rite Cathedral	December 30, 2008 (#08001266)	110 East Lincoln Avenue; 41°00′19″N 80°20′41″W	New Castle	

== See also ==
- List of National Historic Landmarks in Pennsylvania
- National Register of Historic Places listings in Pennsylvania
- List of Pennsylvania state historical markers in Lawrence County
