= Shenango Area School District =

School district in Pennsylvania, United States

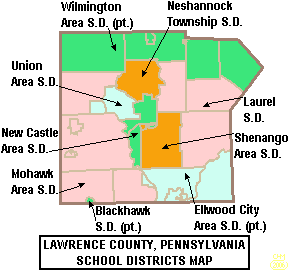

Address
- 2501 Old Pittsburgh Road New Castle, Pennsylvania, 16101; United States

District information
- Type: Public
- Grades: K–12
- NCES District ID: 4221510

Students and staff
- Students: 1,065
- Teachers: 78.0 (FTE)
- Staff: 79.0 (FTE)
- Student–teacher ratio: 13.65

Other information
- Website: www.shenangoschools.org

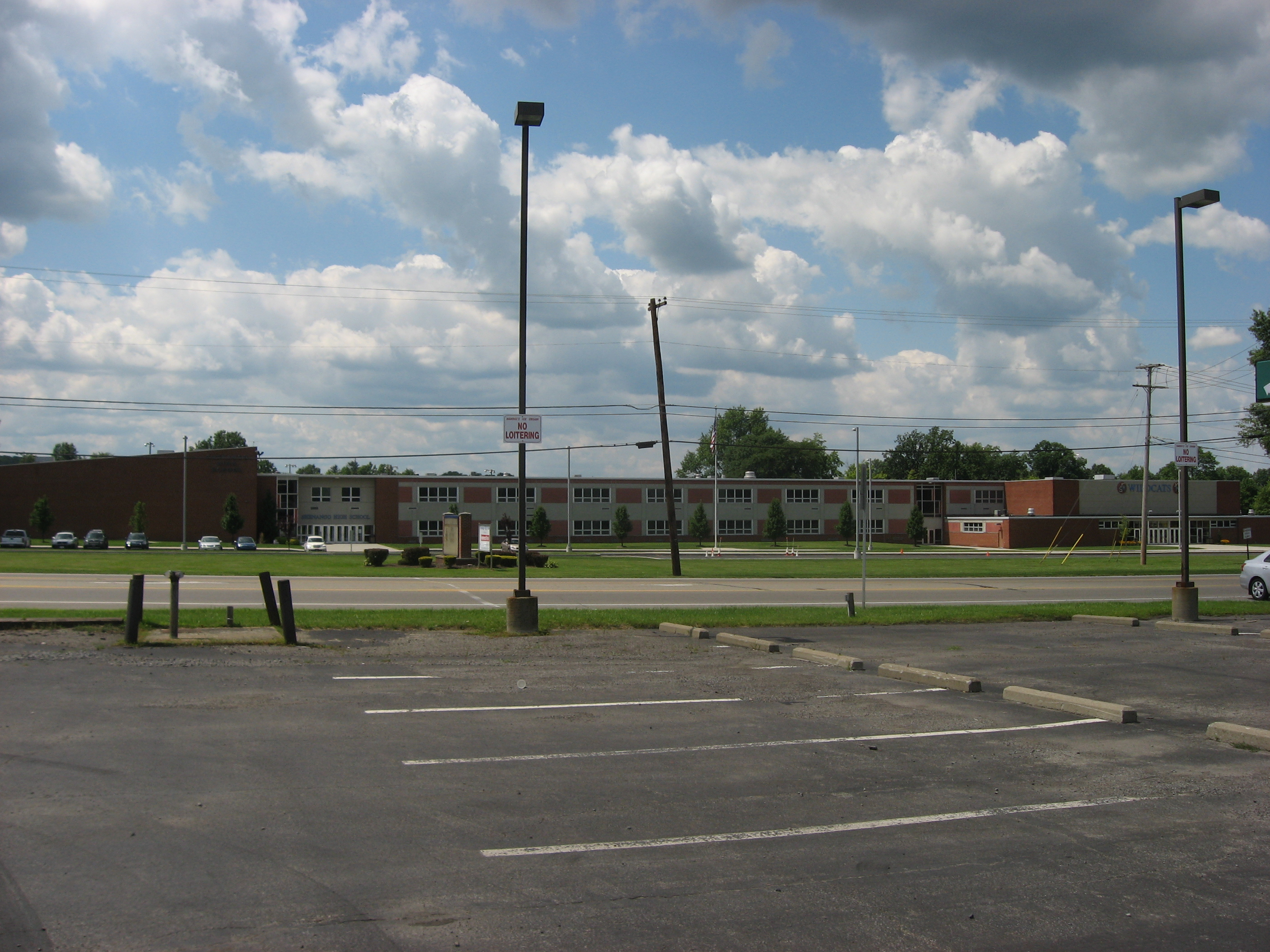
Shenango High School

Shenango Area School District is a public school district located in Lawrence County, Pennsylvania, United States. The district serves Shenango Township and South New Castle Borough. 700 students currently attend the district's elementary school, while an additional 750 are part of the junior-senior high school. Colors are Blue and Gold. The mascot is the Wildcat.

== Athletics, facilities, and activities ==
Shenango's primary athletic rivals is neighboring districts Neshannock, Union and Laurel Areas.

=== Football ===
Shenango football's main uniform colors are blue and gold. They are in the Big 7 Conference featuring Neshannock, and Union. The Wildcat football team plays their home games on campus at, Frank Bongivengo Field at Glenn "Pop" Johnston Stadium. The natural grass playing surface and stadium were most recently renovated in 2009, when a new grass surface was laid, and a new all weather track was installed. The football team also appeared in a 2006 issue of Sports Illustrated in the "This Week's Sign of the Apocalypse". The wildcats main rivals are Neshannock Lancers, Union Scotties, and Laurel Spartans. The Wildcat football team is coached by Michael Commesso, which the team went 2-7 Overall Record (1-7 Conference) in his first year at the helm.

=== Baseball ===
The Wildcat baseball team plays their home games on campus at Chuck Tanner Field. The field was named after the Shenango Alum and former manager of the Pittsburgh Pirates, who led the team to their last World Series victory in 1979. The Wildcats baseball team are coached By Michael Othites.

=== Cross country ===
Shenango Cross Country is coached by Christopher Thompson.

== Notable alumni ==
- Chuck Tanner (1946) Former Major League Baseball Player, and World Series winning Manager.
- Stanley J. Kielar (1982) Inventor of Quadrasteer, used on many General Motors vehicles.
- Steve McNees (2006) Director of Basketball Relations and former point guard on the Akron Zips Men's Basketball team.
