= Shenango Township, Lawrence County, Pennsylvania =

Township in Pennsylvania, US

Coordinates: 40°58′00″N 80°17′59″W

Shenango Township
- Township
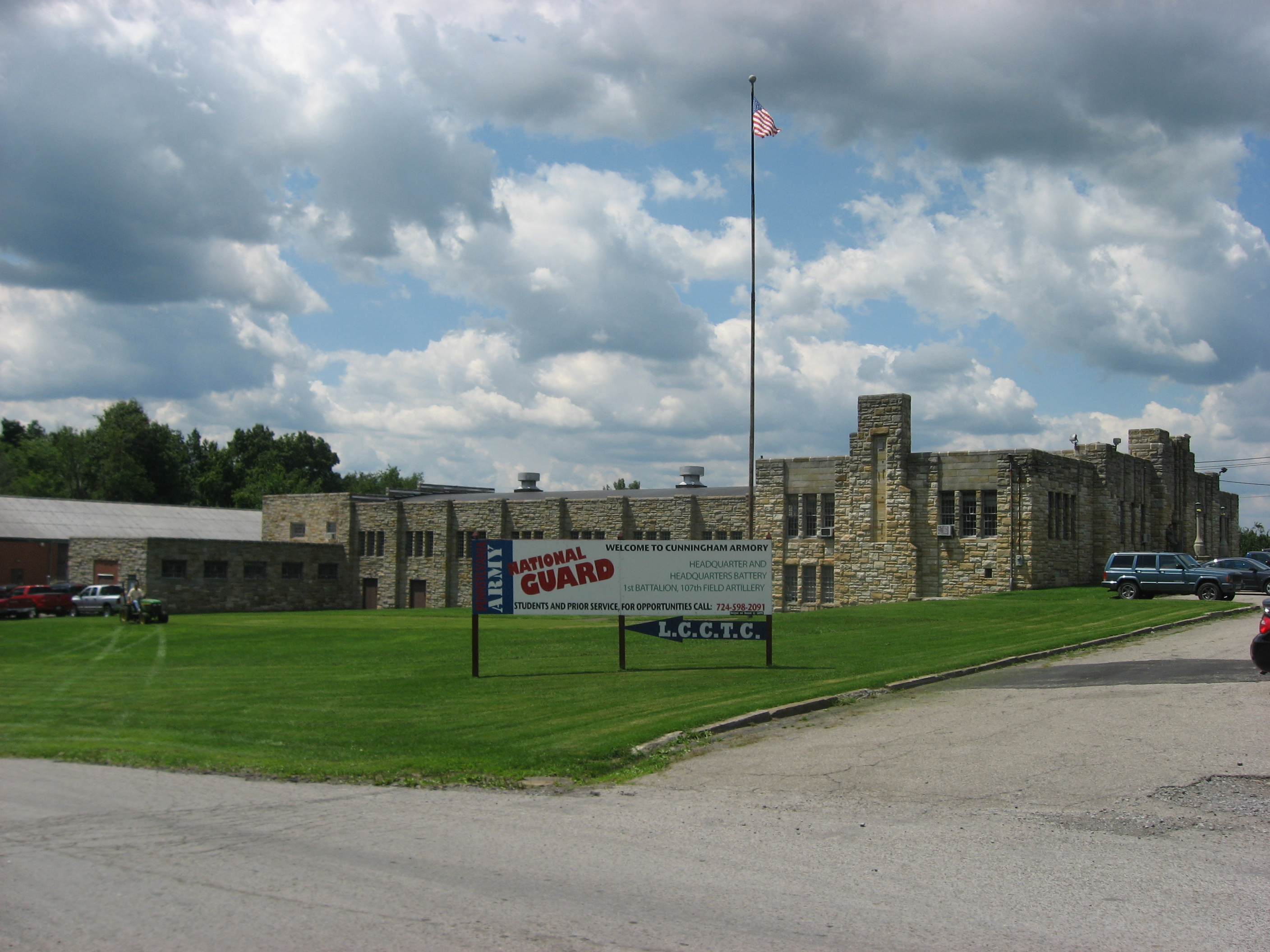

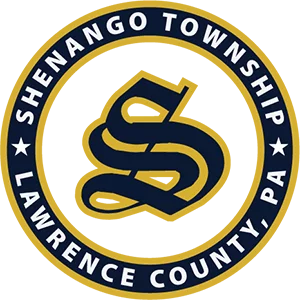
- Seal
- Etymology: Shenango River
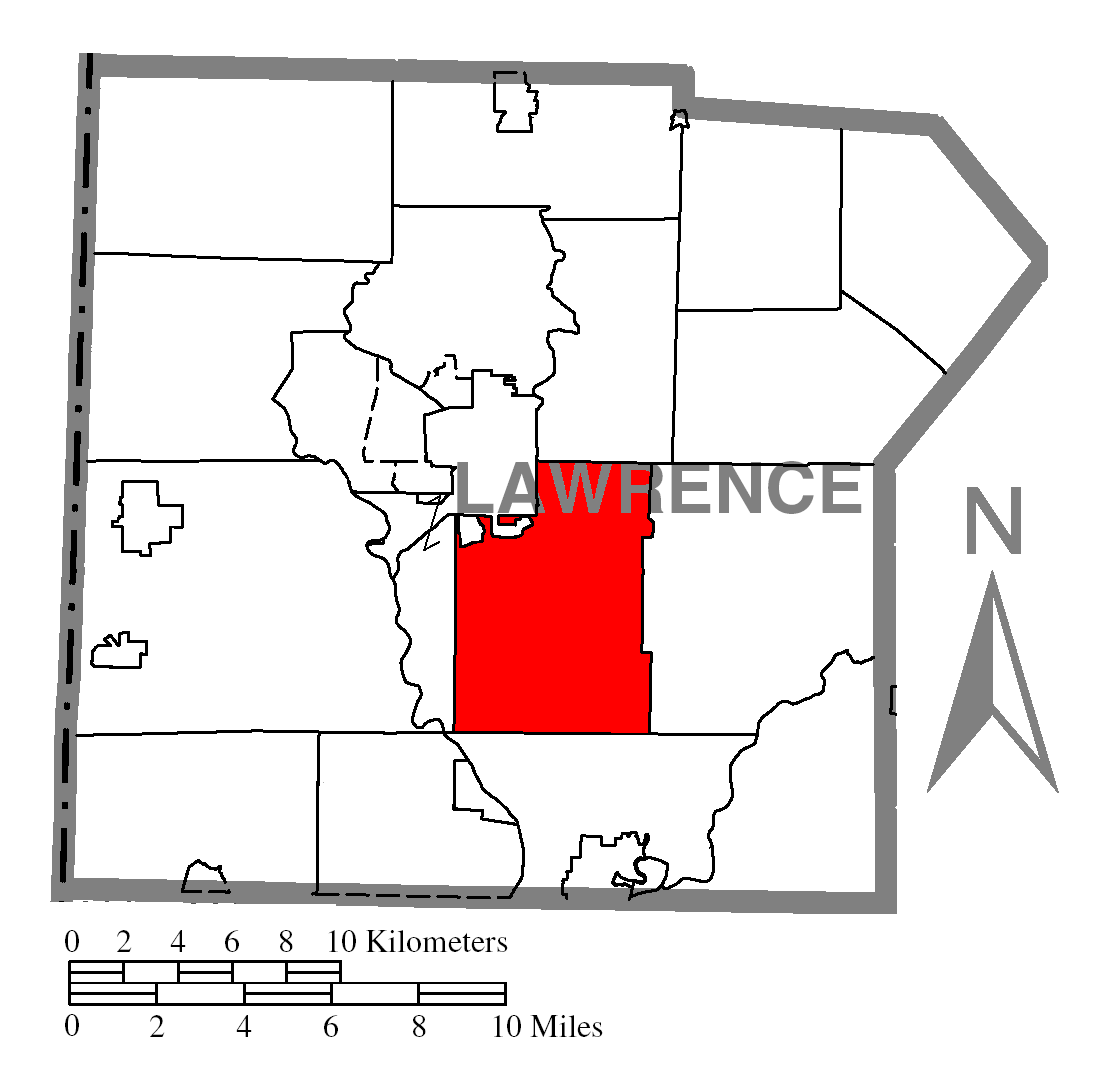
- Location of Shenango Township in Lawrence County

- Location of Lawrence County in Pennsylvania
- Country: United States
- State: Pennsylvania
- County: Lawrence
- First Settled: 1769
- Established: 1804

Government
  - Type: Second Class Township
  - Chairman: Frank Augustine (D)

Area
  - Total: 24.51 sq mi (63.48 km^{2})
  - Land: 24.43 sq mi (63.28 km^{2})
  - Water: 0.077 sq mi (0.20 km^{2})
- Highest elevation (west of Castlewood): 1,400 ft (430 m)
- Lowest elevation (southwest corner of township): 840 ft (260 m)

Population (2020)
  - Total: 7,781
  - Estimate (2022): 7,691
  - Density: 298.2/sq mi (115.14/km^{2})
- Time zone: UTC-4 (EST)
  - Summer (DST): UTC-5 (EDT)
- Postal code: 16101, 16157
- Area code: 724
- FIPS code: 42-073-70080
- Website: www.shenangotownship.org

Shenango Township is a township in Lawrence County, Pennsylvania, United States. The population was 7,133 at the 2020 census, a decline from the figure of 7,479 tabulated in 2010. Shenango Township is situated between the city of New Castle to the north and the borough of Ellwood City to the south.

== Geography ==
According to the United States Census Bureau, the township has a total area of 24.4 square miles (63.3 km^{2}), of which 24.4 square miles (63.2 km^{2}) is land and 0.04% is water.

Unincorporated communities in the township include Weigletown, Altman, East New Castle, Union Valley, Castlewood, Duckrun, and part of Energy.

Adjacent townships and boroughs

- Taylor Township (west)
- Hickory Township (north)
- New Castle (north)
- South New Castle (northwest)
- Slippery Rock Township (east)
- Wayne Township (south)

== History ==
Named for the Shenango River, Shenango Township was incorporated in 1804 as a part of Beaver County, Pennsylvania; Lawrence County did not yet exist. Shenango Township was carved out of the neighboring North Beaver Township, Pennsylvania. At the time of its establishment, Shenango Township stretched from the Shenango River to the Slippery Rock Creek gorge. Over the next 100 years portions of the township would be annexed or reduced to create, South New Castle Borough, Pollock Township (which later became the City of New Castle), Taylor Township, and Slippery Rock Township.

Shenango became one of Lawrence County's original townships and quickly became one of the most populous areas, because the land was suitable for many different purposes. One of the first settlers to live in Shenango was William Carins. He came to this area in 1796 and was the man who gave Shenango its name. Carins was awarded the land after his service in the Revolutionary War; he was paid in 500 acres (200 ha) of land. Carins worked as a cloth weaver and ran a small store where he sold his goods. William Tindall was another one of Shenango's first settlers. Tindall was paid 400 acres (1.6 km^{2}) for his service in the Revolutionary War. He lived to the age of 93 and was buried in the Tindall family cemetery near the "Turkey Hill" section of the township. The Tindall family cemetery is most famously known as the resting place of Mary Black, a supposed, but never proven, witch of around the same time period. Her grave is separate from the others and is the only one dug up. Shenango's largest land owner was a Philadelphia lawyer named Benjamin Chew. Chew bought up large portions of the southern extent of the township under assumed names for pennies an acre. He later resold the land for a profit, and the village of Chewton in Wayne Township was later named after him.

The township was linked to New Castle, Ellwood and Pittsburgh in 1908 by the Pittsburgh, Harmony, Butler and New Castle Railway, an interurban trolley line. The line closed on August 15, 1931, and the trolleys were replaced by buses.

The New Castle Armory was listed on the National Register of Historic Places in 1991.

In November 2024, the electorate of Shenango Township and South New Castle voted in resounding favor of the dissolution of the borough into Shenango Township. The official merger took place on January 1, 2026.

== Demographics ==
Historical population
Census	Pop.	Note	%±
1970	7,798		—
1980	7,937		1.8%
1990	7,187		−9.4%
2000	7,633		6.2%
2010	7,479		−2.0%
2020	7,133		−4.6%
2022 (est.)	7,047		−1.2%
U.S. Decennial Census

As of the census of 2000, there were 7,633 people, 2,854 households, and 2,171 families residing in the township. The population density was 312.6 inhabitants per square mile (120.7/km^{2}). There were 2,996 housing units at an average density of 122.7 per square mile (47.4/km^{2}). The racial makeup of the township was 97.29% White, 1.72% African American, 0.04% Native American, 0.10% Asian, 0.01% Pacific Islander, 0.41% from other races, and 0.43% from two or more races. Hispanic or Latino of any race were 0.76% of the population.

There were 2,854 households, out of which 31.1% had children under the age of 18 living with them, 63.2% were married couples living together, 9.2% had a female householder with no husband present, and 23.9% were non-families. 21.7% of all households were made up of individuals, and 12.6% had someone living alone who was 65 years of age or older. The average household size was 2.56 and the average family size was 2.99.

In the township the population was spread out, with 24.1% under the age of 18, 7.1% from 18 to 24, 25.8% from 25 to 44, 24.3% from 45 to 64, and 18.7% who were 65 years of age or older. The median age was 41 years. For every 100 females there were 102.8 males. For every 100 females age 18 and over, there were 95.1 males.

The median income for a household in the township was $39,949, and the median income for a family was $46,933. Males had a median income of $36,387 versus $21,783 for females. The per capita income for the township was $19,068. About 4.3% of families and 5.2% of the population were below the poverty line, including 7.2% of those under age 18 and 3.2% of those age 65 or over.

== Education ==
The Shenango Area School District serves the township. It was selected by Business Week as one of the top five schools in the state in 2009. Shenango Area Schools also serves the adjacent municipality of South New Castle, Pennsylvania residents as well.

A significant percentage of graduates attend college, with Slippery Rock University of Pennsylvania, Penn State University, Youngstown State University, and Butler County Community College being popular choices.

== Transportation ==
=== Public transportation ===
Shenango Township's public transportation is served by the New Castle Area Transit Authority. They make many stops in Shenango and go as far away as Pittsburgh. In 2013 the Transit Authority opened a brand new Park & Ride on Route 422 for commuters who use one of the bus routes to Pittsburgh.

=== Major roads and highways ===
- US 422
- US 422 Bus.
- PA 65
- PA 168
- PA 388

== Residential ==
Shenango Township is made up of several smaller residential neighborhoods which were built by local developers over the last 50 years. These neighborhoods are connected by the current state local road system in the township. Shenango saw its first residential developments in the late 1950s and 1960s with the construction of most of the homes that can be found today in Ridgewood Court and Willowhurst Circle. These two developments were built at the same time that a new high school was being constructed to serve the community. The 1970s and 1980s saw limited residential development throughout the township, possibly due to the struggling local economy at the time. The 1990s through the present have shown a great turnaround for the township, with the construction of several residential developments. Single family developments such as Woodland Hills, Deer Run, Orchardale Estates Phase I, Jason's Woods Phase I & II, and Cambridge at Hidden Lakes Phase I have led to a significant population growth in Shenango Township over the last 25 years. The construction of townhomes and condos in The Fields and Shenango Greens has added to the diversity of residences in Shenango Township.

== Government and infrastructure ==
The New Castle Youth Development Center (NCYDC), a juvenile detention center of the Pennsylvania Department of Human Services, was located in the township. The facility, which opened in 1969, had 236,444-square-foot (21,966.4 m^{2}) of space in 13 buildings, and almost 150-acre (61 ha) of land. It closed in February 2013. This location came under scrutiny when the property was hastily processed for sale to a non-profit organization from New Jersey in the summer of 2017. In the spring of 2018 the property was transferred to a local social services company, and is proposed to become their new community outreach and commercial center.

=== Board of Supervisors ===
- Frank R. Augustine, Chairman
- Brandon M. Rishel, Vice-chairman
- Joseph M. Pascoe

== Business ==
Shenango Township is served by three separate commercial centers: the U.S. Route 422 corridor, the Pennsylvania Route 65 corridor, and the Shenango Industrial Park. The Route 65 corridor is home to much of the township's shopping district. This area is served by the Lawrence Village Plaza and also many national chain fast food restaurants.

The Route 422 corridor is more of a light industrial-focused area which is anchored by the McKesson Corporation, Con Yeager Spice Company, Portersville Valve, and a recently renovated motel. This area is also home to the township's lone remaining grocery store.

== Parks and recreation ==
Shenango Township's main recreation center is the Shenango Township Community Park, which includes a children's playground area, four covered pavilions, restroom facilities, a quarter-mile walking trail, pickleball, and bocce courts. Shenango Township also owns another recreation area on the corner of Shenango Park Drive and Nearwood Drive.

Shenango Township is home to a portion of the North Country Trail, which runs through the southern section of the county, with on and off-road portions. In 2018, the township was a recipient of $980,000 grant to begin improvements to a portion of the on road trail segment.

Although owned by the city of New Castle, Sylvan Heights Public Golf Course is located within Shenango Township. The 18 hole course lies between PA 65 and Old Princeton Roads.
