= North Hill Historic District (New Castle, Pennsylvania) =

Historic district in Pennsylvania, United States

- U.S. National Register of Historic Places
- U.S. Historic district
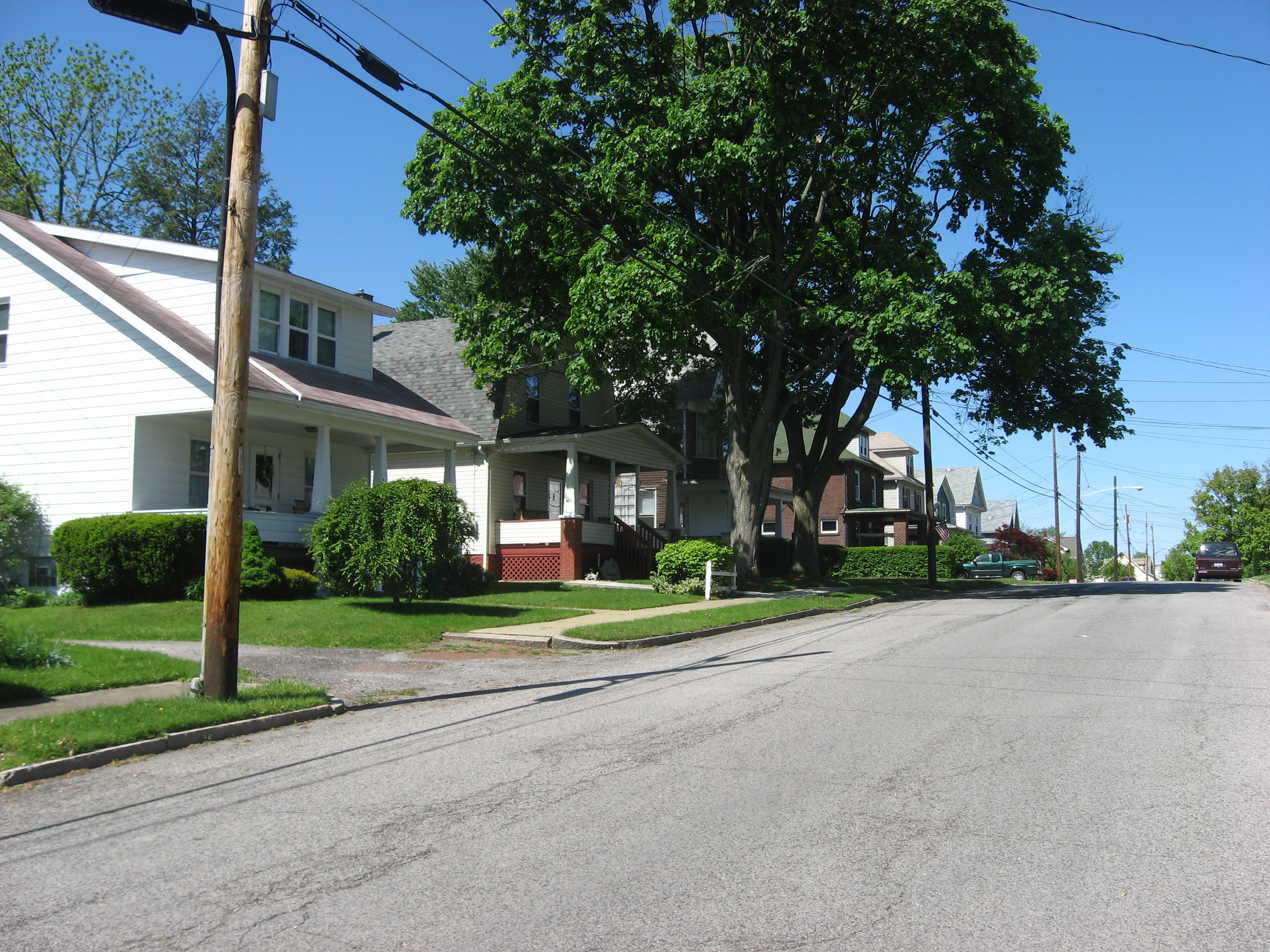
- Fairmont Avenue, North Hill Historic District

- Location within Pennsylvania
- Location: New Castle, Pennsylvania
- Coordinates: 41°0′48″N 80°20′37″W
- Area: 449.7 acres (182 ha)
- Architectural style: 19th and 20th Century, Late Victorian, 19th Century Revival
- NRHP reference No.: 00000056
- Added to NRHP: February 18, 2000

The North Hill Historic District is a residential neighborhood in the city of New Castle, Pennsylvania, that was entered into the National Register of Historic Places in 1999. The 91-block district consists of roughly 450 acres (1.8 km^{2}) of land that sit slightly north of New Castle's business district. The area is historic due to the many ornate homes and mansions—many dating back to the 19th century—that lie within its boundaries.

== Architecture ==
The district includes a variety of architectural styles. Its 1,888 buildings include Late 19th and Early 20th Century, Late Victorian, and Late 19th and 20th Century Revivals. One such residence was built in 1895 for Mathias Holstein Henderson, a prominent New Castle resident who at the time was vice-president of Lawrence Saving and Trust (now National City Bank). The home is now maintained by the Meehan family. The Reis Home, formerly located at 318 East Street, was built for steel manufacturer William Reis. The two-story Colonial Revival home remained in the Reis family until 1993 and was eventually demolished to make room for the new New Castle High School. In addition to these and other historic buildings, a concrete girder bridge on Boyles avenue was reportedly built by the Works Progress Administration (WPA). Also located in the district is the Scottish Rite Cathedral.

Most of the homes in the district are built of either masonry or wood and contain multiple floors. Though the district consists primarily of single and multiple dwellings, there exists a very small percentage of commercial and health care properties. Four schools and four religious buildings also reside within the district. The sidewalk patterns have remained unchanged since at least 1904. Queen Anne, Folk Victorian, Neoclassical, and Colonial Revival are the most common design styles of homes overlooking the downtown area.

== Notable Contributing Structures ==
- Greer Residence (1904–05), 408 North Jefferson Street (now Lawrence County Historical Society )
- Hoyt Residences (now Arts + Education at the Hoyt )
- Henderson Residence (1895) (now Meehan Funeral Home)
- Ohl Residence
- Scottish Rite Cathedral
- Trinity Episcopal Church
- Clen-Moore Presbyterian Church (1929), 220 Clen-Moore Boulevard
- George Washington Intermediate School (1928), 101 East Euclid Avenue
- Garfield Terrace (1897), 417-421 East Garfield Avenue
- Bower Residence (1886-1889), 328 Highland Avenue
- Johnson Residence (1901), 318 Highland Avenue (now Signature Hill )
- Reis/Brown Residence (c. 1885), 312 Highland Avenue (now Highland House, Inc. )

== Significance ==
With urban residential growth in the historic district beginning in 1870 and ending in 1949, the National Register's 50-year guideline for significance is met. The district is significant under National Register Criterion C for architecture, and Criterion A for industry; the neighborhood is where executives of local industries (steel, tin, and iron) lived.

== News Coverage ==
1. Lugene Pezzuto, "Review board against razing Speedway properties", December 7, 2016, https://www.ncnewsonline.com/news/review-board-against-razing-speedway-properties/article_03b32f9e-bc22-11e6-83f1-3bd375185747.html.
2. Susan Linville, PhD, "1950s saw tide of downtown demolition start to roll", May 27, 2017, https://www.ncnewsonline.com/news/susan-linville-s-saw-tide-of-downtown-demolition-start-to/article_f5a26090-4269-11e7-81d4-3f4d73ddf854.html.
3. Susan Linville, PhD, "Urban renewal fervor strikes in 1960s", May 29, 2017, https://www.ncnewsonline.com/news/susan-linville-urban-renewal-fervor-strikes-in-s/article_b858067a-43dd-11e7-b9f5-b35784f3e918.html.
4. Susan Linville, PhD, "In the 1970s, the bubble burst", May 30, 2017, https://www.ncnewsonline.com/news/susan-linville-in-the-s-the-bubble-bursts/article_8701ada0-44bf-11e7-b539-b79b886b6a1e.html.
5. Susan Linville, PhD, "In the 1990s, preservation interest flares, then falters", May 31, 2017, https://www.ncnewsonline.com/news/susan-linville-in-the-preservation-interest-flares-then-falters/article_a221e95a-4579-11e7-88dd-db47cafcb36a.html.
6. Nancy Lowery, "HARB seeking new role in city", June 6, 2017, https://www.ncnewsonline.com/news/local_news/harb-seeking-new-role-in-city/article_68ca7151-112c-577a-9ab1-7d552d200959.html.
7. Nancy Lowery, "Planners favor historic district", June 9, 2017, https://www.ncnewsonline.com/news/local_news/planners-favor-city-historic-district/article_213fcbd0-79fc-5288-a4e0-36966d74e6f1.html.
