= List of Pennsylvania state historical markers in Lawrence County =

Location of Lawrence County in Pennsylvania

This is a list of the Pennsylvania state historical markers in Lawrence County.

This is intended to be a complete list of the official state historical markers placed in Lawrence County, Pennsylvania by the Pennsylvania Historical and Museum Commission (PHMC). The locations of the historical markers, as well as the latitude and longitude coordinates as provided by the PHMC's database, are included below when available. There are 15 historical markers located in Lawrence County.

== Historical markers ==
| Marker title | Image | Date dedicated | Location | Marker type | Topics |
| C. Frederick Post | | August 1, 1968 | Junction of PA 18 & PA 108, south of New Castle; 40.96984°N 80.38345°W | Roadside | Native American |
| Cross-Cut Canal | | March 19, 1948 | US 224 just north of Edinburg (MISSING) | Roadside | Canals, Navigation, Transportation |
| Friedennsstadt - PLAQUE | | June 1, 1922 | PA 18 north of Moravia, on a rock near 2 Friedenstadt markers 40.924069°N 80.379797°W | Plaque | Early Settlement, Native American, Religion |
| Friedensstadt | | March 12, 1948 | PA 18 (4353 Highway 18), near PA 168 junction, N of Moravia [a few meters from marker w/ same title] 40.92443°N 80.37989°W | Roadside | Early Settlement, Native American, Religion |
| Friedensstadt | | March 12, 1948 | PA 18 (4353 Highway 18), near PA 168 junction, N of Moravia [a few meters from marker w/ same title] 40.92429°N 80.37972°W | Roadside | Cities & Towns |
| Harbor Creek | | March 19, 1948 | US 422 at SR 4007, just northwest of New Castle; 41.0358°N 80.40658°W | Roadside | Canals, Navigation, Transportation |
| Ira D. Sankey | | March 19, 1948 | PA 551 at post office, Edinburg; 41.01425°N 80.43675°W | Roadside | Performers, Religion |
| Kuskuskies Towns | | March 19, 1948 | Junction West State Street (US 224) & Jackson Street (PA 551), Edinburg; 41.01529°N 80.44309°W | Roadside | American Revolution, Cities & Towns, Military, Native American |
| Kuskuskies Towns | | March 19, 1948 | Junction PA 18 & 108, south of New Castle; 40.9698°N 80.38347°W | Roadside | Early Settlement, Native American |
| Lawrence County | | October 2, 1982 | Clavelli History Center (Lawrence County Historical Society), 408 North Jefferson Street (PA 18) (access from Lincoln Avenue), New Castle; 41.00584°N 80.34687°W | City | Government & Politics, Government & Politics 19th Century |
| Neshannock Potato | | March 19, 1948 | Perry Highway (US 19) at Shaw Road (SR 1004), just south of Mercer County line, New Wilmington; 41.11168°N 80.2172°W | Roadside | Agriculture |
| Seamless Tube Industry | | September 14, 1994 | Southeast corner of Lawrence Avenue (PA 351) at 7th Street, Ellwood City; 40.85839°N 80.2904°W | City | Business & Industry, Ethnic & Immigration, Professions & Vocations, Steel |
| Squaw Campaign | | March 19, 1948 | Atlantic Avenue, southwest of New Castle; 40.993900°N 80.355683°W | Roadside | American Revolution, Military, Native American |
| Warner Brothers' First Theater | | November 16, 1994 | South Mill Street at Market Street, New Castle; 40.999350°N 80.344217°W | City | Business & Industry, Music & Theater |
| Westminster College | | January 25, 1949 | Northeast corner of Market Street (PA 208) & Neshannock Street (PA 158), New Wilmington; 41.12259°N 80.33294°W | Roadside | Education |

== See also ==
- List of Pennsylvania state historical markers
- National Register of Historic Places listings in Lawrence County, Pennsylvania
