= Cascade Center =

Shopping complex in Pennsylvania, United States

Coordinates: 40.9997°N 80.3439°W

The Cascade Center at the Riverplex is a shopping, dining, and entertainment complex located in downtown New Castle, Pennsylvania. Opened in 2006, the complex offers both indoor and outdoor facilities. It occupies much of the site of the Cascade, which was the first movie theater owned by Warner Bros. The complex is situated at the intersection of East Washington Street and Mill Street. As of 2013, Riverplex Partners, Inc. owns the complex. The top three stories are rented by Refresh Dental Management as their corporate headquarters.

== History ==
The Warners, residents of nearby Youngstown, Ohio, were sons of Polish Jews wanting to break into the newly-established and burgeoning film business. After successfully presenting a used copy of The Great Train Robbery at Idora Park in Youngstown, the brothers traveled to New Castle to screen the movie in a vacant store on a site that would later become the Cascade Center. This makeshift theater, called the Bijou, was furnished with chairs borrowed from a local undertaker. In 1906, the brothers purchased a small theater in New Castle near the Bijou, which they called the Cascade Movie Palace, taking its name from the nearby Cascade Park. They maintained the Cascade Movie Palace until 1907, when they went into film distribution.

In the next couple of years, the building that housed the Bijou would host various other businesses while the Cascade itself would eventually be demolished and replaced by a parking lot. The buildings themselves were abandoned by the 1980s when New Castle, like most other Rust Belt cities, saw the collapse of the steel industry.

By the mid-1990s, only two businesses were operating on the site that would later become the Cascade Center: Main Street Clothiers & Custom Tailors, a men's suit shop, and the B&O Railroad Federal Credit Union. The credit union was located in a separate building on a site bordering Mill Street and the Neshannock Creek; built on the site of the Cascade after it had been used as a parking lot.

In 1996, parts of the Bijou building collapsed onto East Washington Street, one of the city's main thoroughfares. The portion that collapsed was next door to Main Street Clothiers, which had just opened three years before. The city of New Castle was very close to issuing a condemnation notice, however due to the building's historical significance, it has remained intact for decades. New Castle then announced development plans to refurbish it into what would eventually become the Cascade Center.

== Development ==
The city took most of the property by eminent domain and stabilized parts of the wall that had collapsed, closing off the sidewalk in front of the building to prevent accidents until the wall was completely rebuilt. The city persuaded the B&O Credit Union, now the First Choice Federal Credit Union, to temporarily move into the nearby mall, the Cascade Galleria, so that the property could be bought and transformed into the Cascade Center. The credit union eventually moved out of the mall back into their own building out in neighboring Union Township. Main Street Clothiers was allowed to stay in the building where they remain today, and although not officially part of the Cascade Center, they do advertise in the complex, and have even expanded their business by screen-printing T-shirts. Additionally, the store serves as the area's J. C. Penney Catalog Center after Rite Aid acquired Eckerd Pharmacy in 2007 and ended the J. C. Penney Catalog Centers in the former Eckerd locations. Coincidentally, Main Street sits next door to a former J. C. Penney that is now a coffee shop.

Although the downtown streets & sidewalks were rebuilt in the early 2000s to resemble the turn of the 19th century, the complex itself wouldn't begin reconstruction until 2003 and was completed in 2006. The interiors of the existing buildings were demolished while the site of the Cascade was completely rebuilt into a close replication of the Cascade. The city also acquired the former Mellon Bank parking lot, which became the general parking lot for downtown and the main parking lot for the Cascade Center. The alley that ran along Neshannock Creek behind the buildings was permanently closed and added to the property of the complex, becoming a promenade that leads to an outdoor amphitheater between the former J. C. Penney building and the creek along East Washington Street. The northern terminus of Pennsylvania Route 65 (situated along East Washington Street) was extended over a mile near the complex on the other side of the creek.

Much like Station Square in Pittsburgh, the complex is an example of adaptive reuse, and focuses on the early years of motion pictures much like Station Square focuses on trains. The complex largely remains vacant, although businesses have started to open up with events being held both inside the complex and at the amphitheater.

Despite the historical connection to the Warner Bros. studio, the complex has no association with Warner Bros. Discovery, the current parent company of Warner Bros. Entertainment. Cass Warner, the granddaughter of Harry Warner, did visit the complex just before it officially opened in 2006.

== Tenants ==
Although at one point the complex had three tenants, in 2010 all three closed for unknown reasons and the complex was put up for sale. The outdoor promenade and amphitheater, which are publicly owned, are still used by the city for downtown events.

Main Street Clothiers and Custom Tailors is not an official part of the complex as the store has outdoor access, unlike its neighboring businesses, and predates the creation of the complex.

Reinvestment in the center has picked up in recent years, with Two Rivers Coffee Shop and The Commonwealth restaurant both opening in 2014. However, by 2024 these had both closed.
