= South New Castle, Pennsylvania =

Unincorporated community in Pennsylvania, US

- Unincorporated community
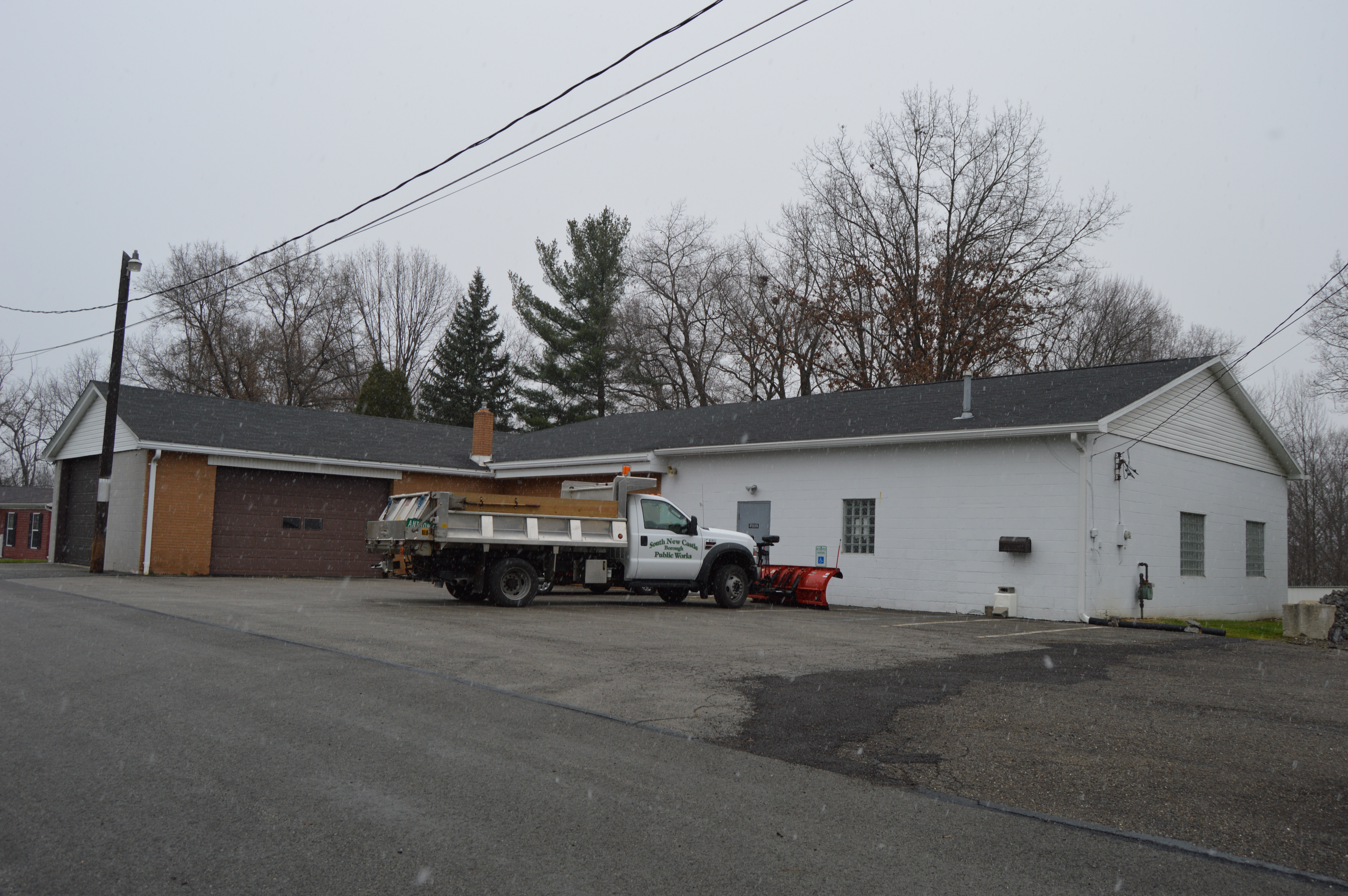
- Municipal building

- Location in Lawrence County, Pennsylvania
- Coordinates: 40°58′32″N 80°20′41″W
- Country: United States
- State: Pennsylvania
- County: Lawrence
- Township: Shenango
- Established: 1901

Area
  - Total: 0.32 sq mi (0.84 km^{2})
  - Land: 0.32 sq mi (0.84 km^{2})
  - Water: 0 sq mi (0.00 km^{2})
- Elevation (middle of borough): 1,000 ft (300 m)
- Highest elevation (southwest corner of borough): 1,100 ft (340 m)
- Lowest elevation (Big Run): 840 ft (260 m)

Population (2020)
  - Total: 647
  - Density: 1,995.7/sq mi (770.53/km^{2})
- Time zone: UTC-4 (EST)
  - Summer (DST): UTC-5 (EDT)
- Area code: 724
- FIPS code: 42-72376

South New Castle is an unincorporated community and former borough in Shenango Township, Lawrence County, Pennsylvania, United States. The population was 649 at the 2020 census. It is a residential community south of the city of New Castle.

South New Castle borough was founded in 1901. In 2023, the electorate of Shenango Township and South New Castle voted in resounding favor of the dissolution of the borough into Shenango Township. The official merger took place on January 1, 2026.

== Geography ==
South New Castle is located at 40°58′32″N 80°20′41″W (40.975430, -80.344624).

According to the United States Census Bureau, the borough had a total area of 0.3 square mile (0.9 km^{2}), all land.

== Demographics ==
Historical population
Census	Pop.	Note	%±
1910	551		—
1920	920		67.0%
1930	1,038		12.8%
1940	998		−3.9%
1950	993		−0.5%
1960	955		−3.8%
1970	940		−1.6%
1980	879		−6.5%
1990	805		−8.4%
2000	808		0.4%
2010	709		−12.3%
2020	647		−8.7%
2021 (est.)	644	▼	−0.5%
U.S. Decennial Census

As of the census of 2000, there were 808 people, 309 households, and 232 families residing in the borough. The population density was 2,380.0 inhabitants per square mile (918.9/km^{2}). There were 326 housing units at an average density of 960.2 per square mile (370.7/km^{2}). The racial makeup of the borough was 99.38% White, 0.37% Native American, 0.12% Asian, and 0.12% from two or more races.

There were 309 households, out of which 31.1% had children under the age of 18 living with them, 61.2% were married couples living together, 10.4% had a female householder with no husband present, and 24.6% were non-families. 22.0% of all households were made up of individuals, and 15.5% had someone living alone who was 65 years of age or older. The average household size was 2.61 and the average family size was 3.04.

In the borough the population was spread out, with 22.9% under the age of 18, 9.7% from 18 to 24, 24.1% from 25 to 44, 24.8% from 45 to 64, and 18.6% who were 65 years of age or older. The median age was 41 years. For every 100 females there were 94.2 males. For every 100 females age 18 and over, there were 89.9 males.

The median income for a household in the borough was $30,568, and the median income for a family was $38,472. Males had a median income of $29,926 versus $20,781 for females. The per capita income for the borough was $15,095. About 5.8% of families and 8.2% of the population were below the poverty line, including 9.8% of those under age 18 and 4.8% of those age 65 or over.
