= Scottish Rite Cathedral (New Castle, Pennsylvania) =

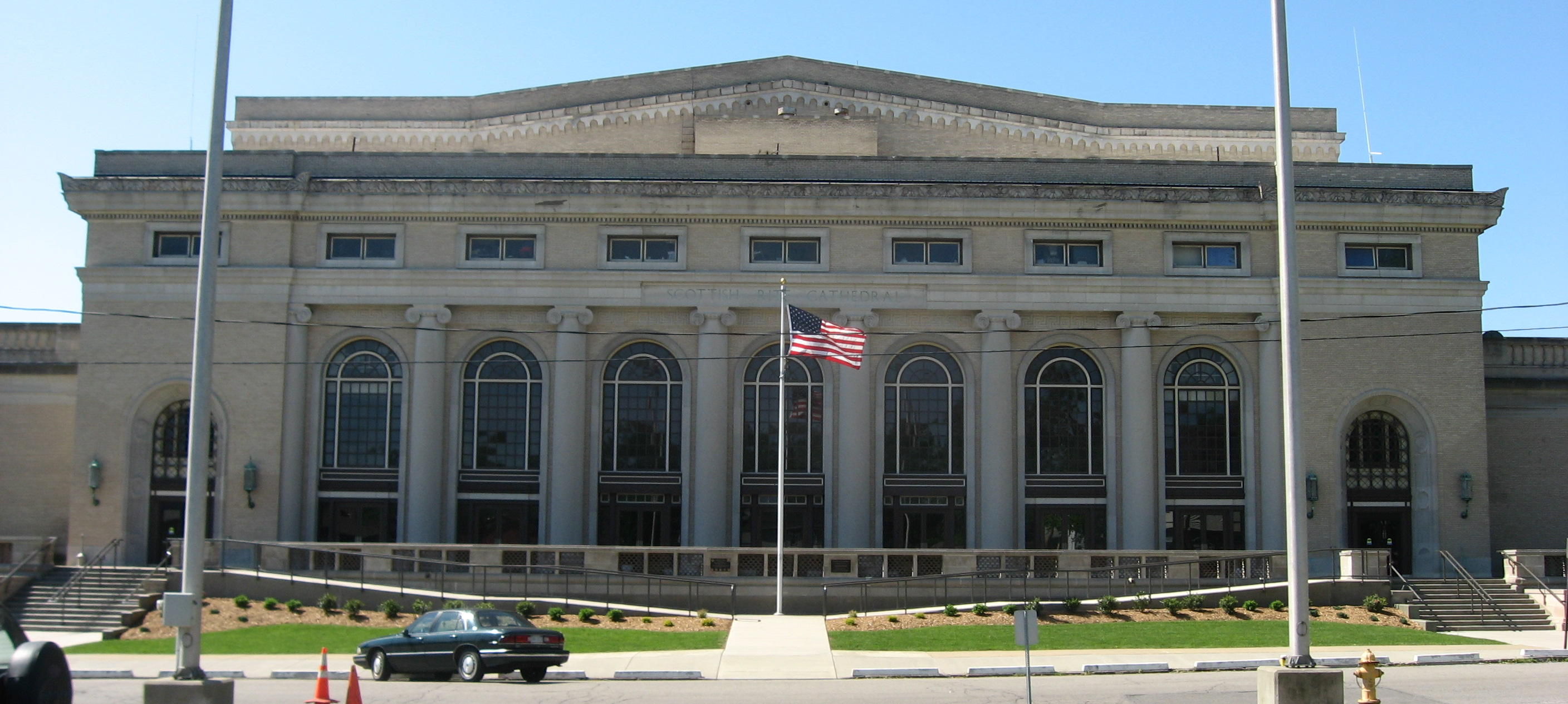
- Front view of Cathedral
- Interactive map of the Scottish Rite Cathedral area

General information
- Type: Cathedral
- Architectural style: Neo-classic
- Location: 41°0′19″N 80°20′41″W, 110 E. Lincoln Ave, New Castle, PA, USA
- Construction started: 1925
- Completed: 1926
- Inaugurated: November 8, 1926
- Cost: 1.7 million
- Owner: Cathedral Foundation

Height
- Height: 180 ft (55 m)

Design and construction
- Architect: R. G. Schmidt

Other information
- Seating capacity: 2,834

Website
- cathedralnewcastle.com
- Scottish Rite Cathedral
- U.S. National Register of Historic Places
- Location within Pennsylvania
- Interactive map showing the location of Scottish Rite Cathedral
- Location: 110 E. Lincoln Ave., New Castle, Pennsylvania
- Coordinates: 41°00′17″N 80°20′41″W
- Area: 6.8 acres (2.8 ha)
- Built: 1926
- Built by: Schmid, Richard Gustav; Seisel, S.M.
- Architectural style: Classical Revival
- NRHP reference No.: 08001266
- Added to NRHP: December 30, 2008

The Scottish Rite Cathedral in New Castle, Pennsylvania, United States, was designed by Milwaukee architect R. G. Schmidt and built in 1925. First used in November 1926 as a meeting place for Masonic groups, it is listed in the National Register of Historic Places in Lawrence County, Pennsylvania. Unable to pay taxes during the Great Depression, the Masons lost the building to the county, but reacquired it in 1940 with the creation of the Cathedral Foundation. This non-profit foundation continues to operate the Cathedral today.

== History ==
John S. Wallace, a Masonic official and first Commander-In-Chief of the New Castle area, desired a building large enough to accommodate all Masonic groups. Though the land on which the Cathedral sits was purchased in 1918, additional land was bought in 1921, 1923, and 1924. Because the builders ran into quicksand, piling had to be added to the back of the building to ensure the structure was sound. At the time it was built, the Cathedral was the largest facility between New York and Chicago.

== Today ==
The Cathedral continues to be used today for wedding receptions, banquets, and most notably for performances by the Pittsburgh Symphony Orchestra. The auditorium in which the symphony performs has a seating capacity of 2,834, and a stage that is 82 feet wide, 46 feet deep, and 65 feet high.
