= S. R. Thompson House =

Historic house in Pennsylvania, United States

- U.S. National Register of Historic Places
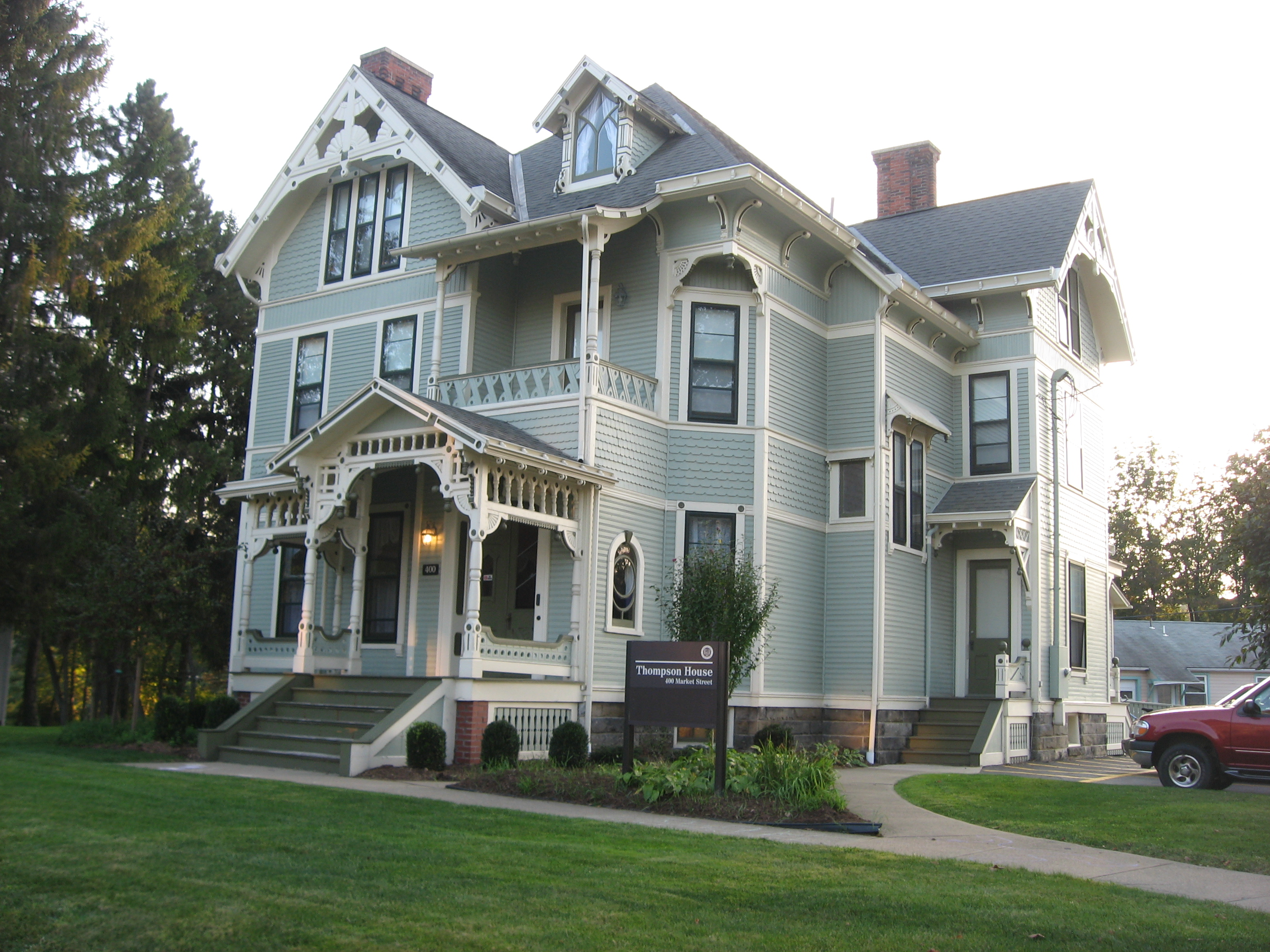
- S.R. Thompson House, April 2009

- Location within Pennsylvania Location within the United States
- Interactive map showing the location of S.R. Thompson House
- Location: 400 Market St., New Wilmington, Pennsylvania
- Coordinates: 41°7′7″N 80°20′1″W
- Area: 0.4 acres (0.16 ha)
- Built: 1884
- Architectural style: Queen Anne
- NRHP reference No.: 85000467
- Added to NRHP: March 7, 1985

S. R. Thompson House is a historic home at New Wilmington, Lawrence County, Pennsylvania. It was built in 1884, and is a three-story, Queen Anne style dwelling with a steep hipped roof and projecting gables. It has irregular massing, multiple porches, five types of wood siding, and stick style decoration. The house has been owned by Westminster College since 1945, and used for administrative offices and a women's residence.

It was added to the National Register of Historic Places in 1985.
