= New Castle Area Transit Authority =

- Founded: 1959
- Headquarters: 315 E. Washington St; New Castle, Pennsylvania
- Service area: Lawrence County, Pennsylvania
- Service type: Bus
- Routes: 17
- Fuel type: Diesel
- Website: newcastletransit.org

New Castle Area Transit Authority is a public transportation service located in Lawrence County, Pennsylvania. It provides inter-city bus and paratransit service to select communities within the county. Because the region is located within the metropolitan (but not the urban) area of Pittsburgh, service is provided to the downtown area.

Connections can no longer be made to Youngstown's Western Reserve Transit Authority. The western end point of the New Castle system is on Route 91, on U.S. 422 at the Country Manor Social Hall at the Ohio/Pennsylvania border , about 3 miles from the easternmost point in the WRTA system (Route 32 Wilson-Struthers, U.S. 422 at Struthers-Liberty Road). The New Castle system formerly served the nearby Lincoln Knolls Plaza and made a direct connection with the WRTA route, but New Castle buses no longer enter Ohio.

== Route list ==
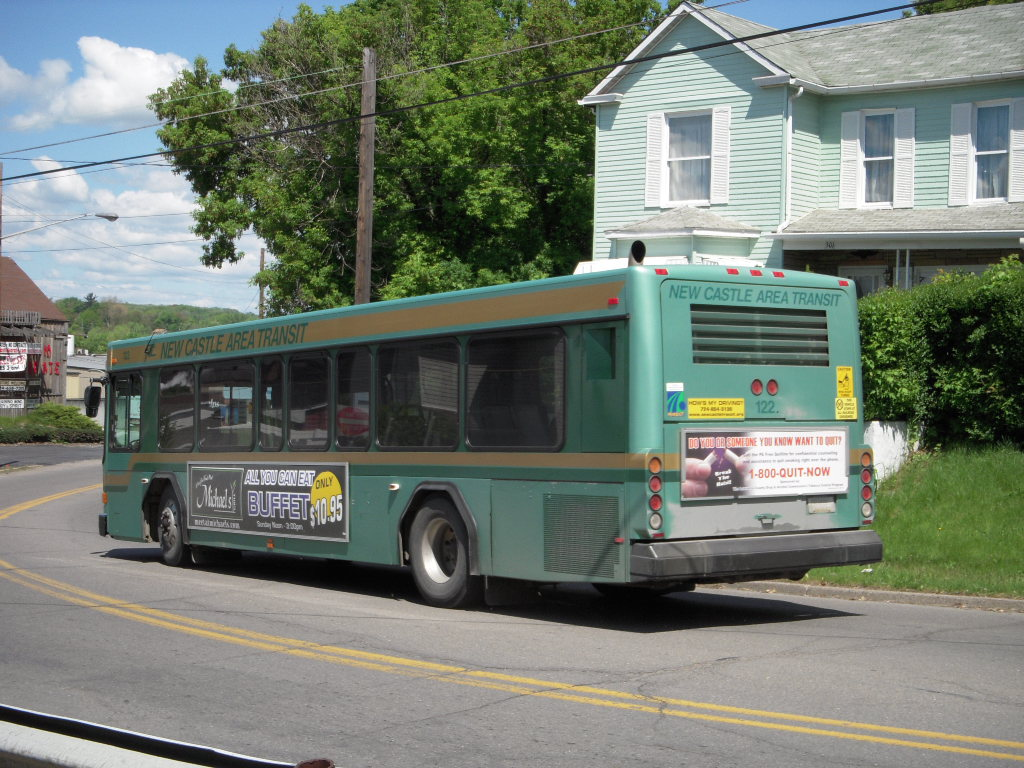
New Castle Area Transit Authority bus

All routes run Monday though Saturday and terminate at the Downtown New Castle transfer center, unless otherwise noted.

- 1- Highland Avenue/Shenley Square- serves New Castle city
- 2- North City/Neshannock- serves New Castle city, Neshannock Township (Northwest New Castle)
- 3- Westgate Plaza/Union- serves New Castle city, Union Township (Oakwood), Westgate & Union Shopping Centers
- 4- Westside/Mahoningtown- serves New Castle city, Bessemer, Union Township (Mahoningtown)
- 5- Southside/Moravia Street- serves New Castle city
- 6- Cascade Park/Lawrence Village- serves New Castle City, Shenango Township, Lawrence Village Shopping Plaza
- 7- Croton Avenue/Lower Eastside- serves New Castle city, Hickory Township
- 8- Gaston Park/Upper Eastside- serves New Castle City, Shenango Township
- 11- Jefferson Street- serves New Castle city
- 71- Pittsburgh- New Castle city, Shenango Township, Portersville Park & Ride, Evans City Park & Ride to Downtown Pittsburgh (weekdays)
- 75- New Wilmington/Volant- Volant, New Wilmington, Wilmington Township to New Castle city (Wednesday & Thursday only)
- 76- New Castle/Ellwood City- Ellwood City, Ellport, Franklin Township to Lawrence Village Plaza, New Castle city, Union Plaza (Monday, Tuesday, & Friday only)
- 81- Iron Mountain- New Castle city, Hickory Township, Scott Township, Slippery Rock, Slippery Rock Township to Iron Mountain Facility (weekday rush hour)
- 91- School of Trades/Villa Maria- Pulaski Township (New Bedford), Villa Maria spiritual center, New Castle School of Trades to Union Plaza, New Castle city

== Park & Ride Lots (for Pittsburgh Service) ==
- I-79 Exit 83 (Jackson Township)- 75 spaces
- I-79 Exit 96 (Portersville)- 79 spaces
- Route 422 (Slippery Rock Township)- 40 spaces
- New Castle Transit Center- 173 spaces
- Transit Authority Offices (New Castle)- 25 spaces
