= New Castle, Pennsylvania =

City in Pennsylvania, US

- City
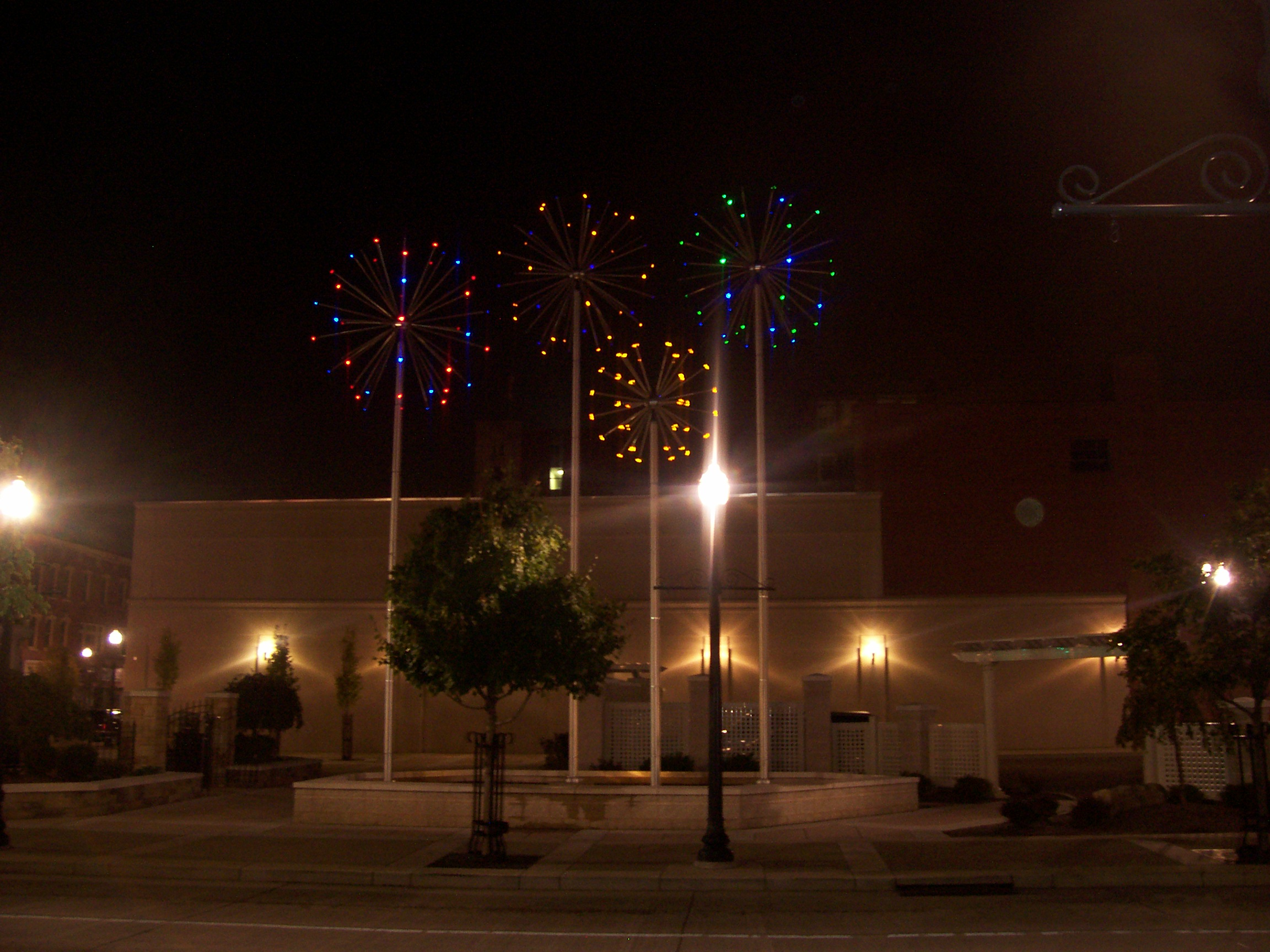
- Zambelli Plaza in New Castle

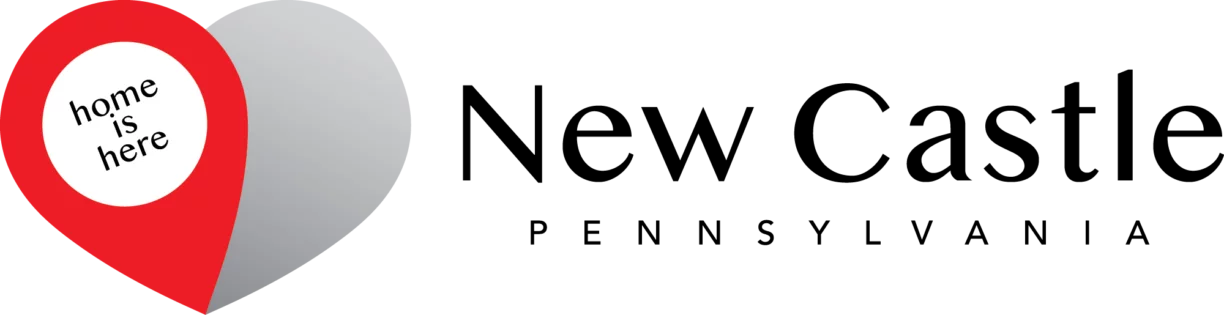
- Logo
- Nicknames: Fireworks Capital of America, Hot Dog Capital of the World, Little New York City
- Interactive map of New Castle, Pennsylvania
- Location within Pennsylvania Location within the United States
- Coordinates: 40°59′50″N 80°20′40″W
- Country: United States
- State: Pennsylvania
- County: Lawrence
- Established: 1798
- Incorporated: 1825 (borough); 1869 (city)

Government
  - Type: Home Rule Charter
  - Mayor: Mark Elisco

Area
  - Total: 8.54 sq mi (22.13 km^{2})
  - Land: 8.31 sq mi (21.52 km^{2})
  - Water: 0.24 sq mi (0.62 km^{2}) 2.81%
- Highest elevation (Note: near Mahoningtown): 1,204 ft (367 m)
- Lowest elevation (Note: Beaver River): 758 ft (231 m)

Population (2020)
  - Total: 21,926
  - Density: 2,639.4/sq mi (1,019.09/km^{2})
- Time zone: UTC−5 (EST)
  - Summer (DST): UTC−4 (EDT)
- ZIP Code: 6 total ZIP codes: 16101, 16102, 16103, 16105, 16107, 16108
- Area codes: 724, 878
- FIPS code: 42-53368
- Website: www.newcastlepa.org

New Castle is a city in Lawrence County, Pennsylvania, United States, and its county seat. Located along the Shenango River at the mouth of Neshannock Creek, it is 43 miles (69 km) northwest of Pittsburgh near the Pennsylvania–Ohio border, approximately 17 miles (27 km) southeast of Youngstown, Ohio. The city had a population of 21,926 as of the 2020 census. The commercial center of a fertile agricultural region, New Castle is included in the northwestern fringes of the Pittsburgh metropolitan area.

== History ==
=== 18th century ===
In 1798, John Carlysle Stewart, a civil engineer, traveled to western Pennsylvania to resurvey the "donation lands", which had been reserved for veterans of the Revolutionary War. He discovered that the original survey had neglected to stake out approximately 50 acres (20 ha) at the confluence of the Shenango River and Neshannock Creek, at that time a part of Allegheny County. The Indian town of Kuskusky was listed on early maps in this location. Claiming the land for himself, he laid out in April 1798 what was to become the town of New Castle. It comprised approximately that same 50 acres (20 ha), in what was then part of Allegheny County.

=== 19th century ===
In 1825, New Castle became a borough, having a population of about 300. The borough originally was a part of Mercer County. On April 5, 1849, the governor of Pennsylvania signed an act creating Lawrence County (named in honor of U.S. Navy Captain James Lawrence) with New Castle as its seat. New Castle became a city in 1869 and was headed by its first mayor, Thomas B. Morgan. At that time, the population had increased to about 6,000.

In 1849, a group of Old Order Amish families from Mifflin County, Pennsylvania settled just north of New Castle in New Wilmington. Later migrations from Holmes County, Ohio would make this Amish community one of the largest in Pennsylvania. Approximately 2,000 Amish live and work presently in the townships north of New Castle.

Business in New Castle began to flourish in the early 19th century with the construction of the Beaver and Erie Canal system, which made its way through the city. Numerous manufacturing plants became located in New Castle because of the availability of transportation facilities and ready access to raw material markets. The canal system was later supplemented and then replaced by railroads which offered greater speed and capacity for freight, as well as year-round service.

In the 1870s, the city became a major hub of the Pittsburgh and Lake Erie Railroad. New Castle's population swelled from 11,600 in 1890 to 28,339 in 1900, and to 38,280 in 1910, as immigrants, particularly from Italy, flocked to the city to work in the mills and nearby limestone quarries. Italian laborers of the era were frequent victims of the Black Hand society, which employed blackmail and extortion to rob the workers of their pay. In 1907 the headquarters of the Black Hand for the entire region was discovered in the village of Hillsville a few miles west of New Castle. By this time New Castle was one of the fastest-growing cities in the country, and with the construction of the largest tin plate mill in America, the city became the tin plate capital of the world. The tin plate industry marked a new increase in the city's prosperity.

External videos
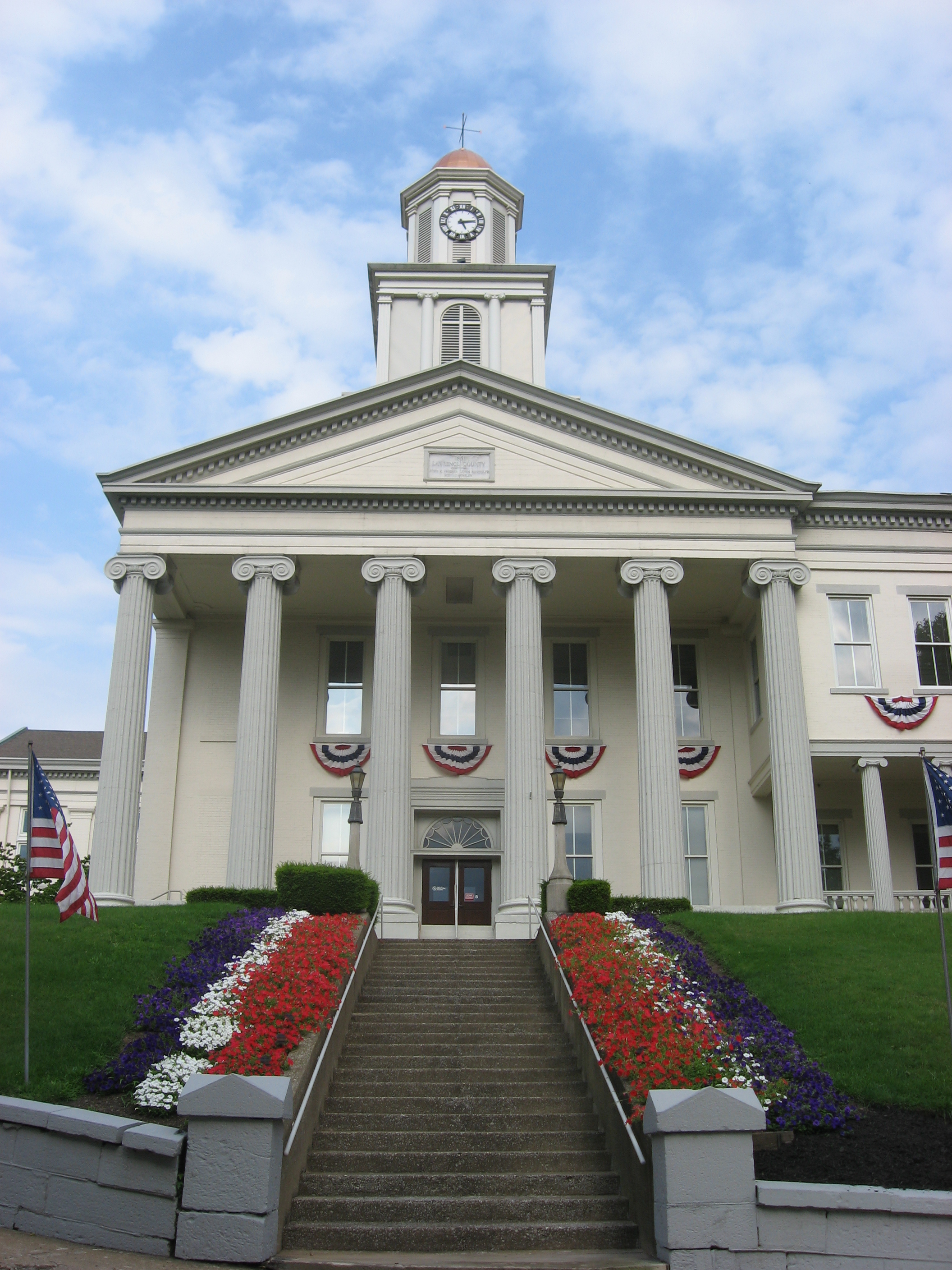
- Portrait of an American City: 200 Years of New Castle History, Lawrence County Historical Society (2:56)

=== 20th century ===
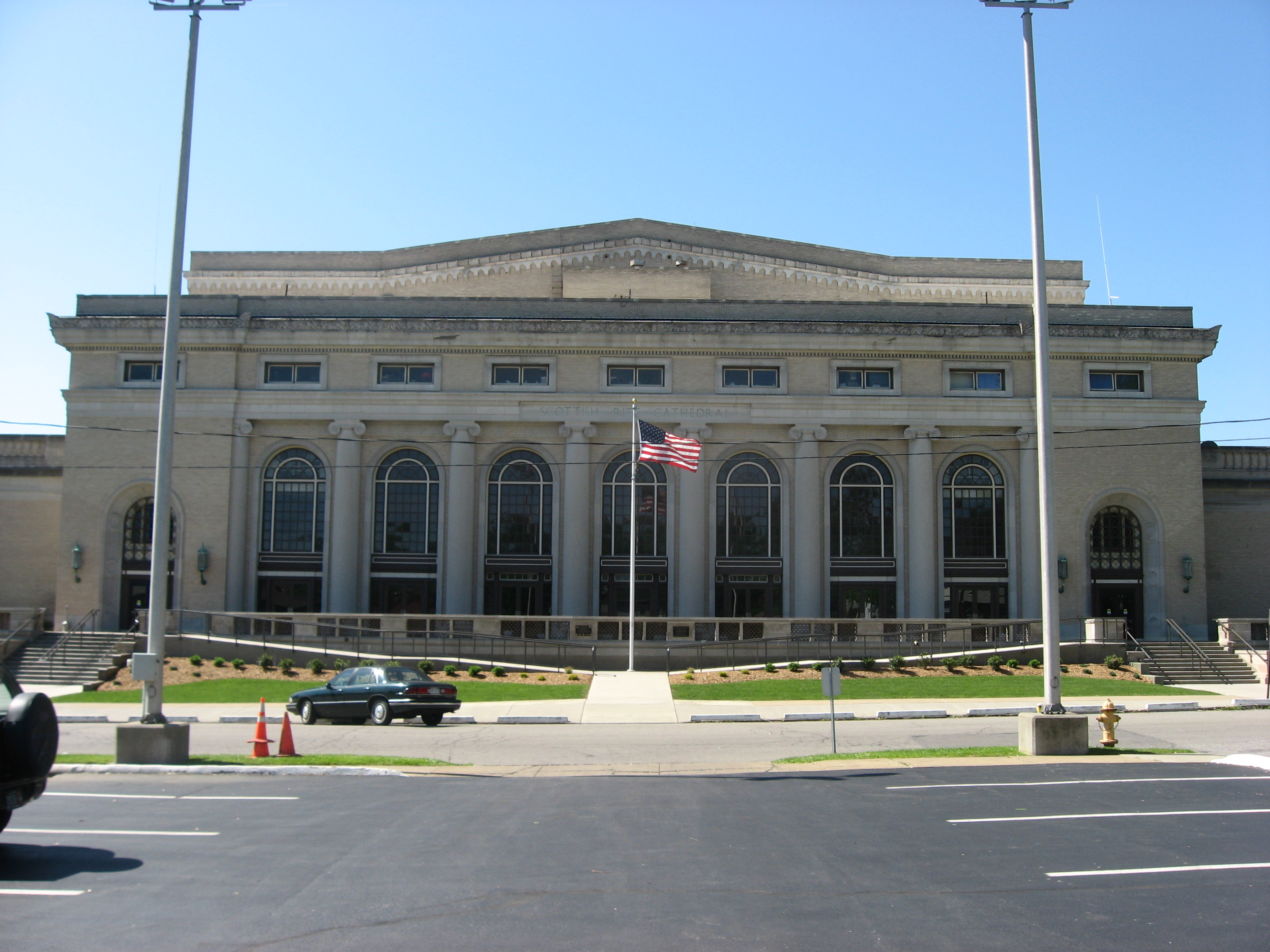
The Scottish Rite Cathedral was built in 1925

In 1908, New Castle was linked to Pittsburgh by the Pittsburgh, Harmony, Butler and New Castle Railway, an interurban trolley line. Steel, paper mills, foundries, a bronze bushing factory, and car construction plants contributed to the region's economy. Shenango China produced commercial china and created the fine Castleton China line for the White House, including dinnerware for Presidents Dwight D. Eisenhower and Lyndon B. Johnson. Other ceramic factories produced bathroom fixtures and industrial refractory materials.

In the 1920s, New Castle enjoyed its greatest prosperity. The landscape of the city was transformed with the building of many beautiful structures, some of which still stand, such as the Scottish Rite Cathedral, St. Mary's Church, and the Castleton Hotel. The city also established its identity. New Castle is known both as the "hot dog capital of the world" and the "fireworks capital of America". Its chili dogs are the product of Greek immigrants who came to New Castle in the early 20th century and established restaurants along with their homes. The renown for fireworks is credited to two local fireworks companies of international stature, S.Vitale Pyrotechnic Industries, Inc. (Pyrotecnico) and Zambelli Internationale. The first fireworks manufacturer in New Castle was Leopold Fazzoni, who owned and operated the Fazzoni Brothers Fireworks Company. Fazzoni came to New Castle from Italy in 1886 and worked in the tin mills to earn enough money to start his own business. He was issued the first certificate for fireworks manufacturing in the state. Of the people who worked with the Fazzoni family, many founded their own businesses, such as Paul Rozzi, Jacob Conti, Constantino Vitale, and Joseph Zambelli.

Despite recent economic challenges, the city continues to serve as the headquarters of Pyrotecnico Fireworks, the winner of the 2008 Gold Jupiter, awarded at the world's most prestigious fireworks venue: LaRonde in Montreal, Canada. The company was started by Constantino Vitale in Italy in 1889, who immigrated to New Castle in the 1920s, continuing his business there. Five generations of the Vitale family have transformed the company. In the 1990s the company's name was changed to Pyrotecnico. Also located in New Castle is Zambelli Fireworks, which was founded in New Castle. Zambelli Fireworks is one of the world's leading fireworks and pyrotechnics companies. These fireworks companies have been featured in venues such as presidential celebrations and Super Bowls.

In the 1930s, the city, along with most cities of America, suffered during the Great Depression. During this time, the federal government established the Works Progress Administration (WPA) and the Civilian Conservation Corps (CCC). These programs offered jobs to many displaced workers. Many of the stone walls built by the WPA and the CCC still stand as a reminder of the historic demise of the economy. In the 1940s, industry temporarily surged during wartime.

In 1950, the population peaked at 48,834, but became part of the Rust Belt, with population dwindling to 28,334 by 1990. New Castle is the county seat of Lawrence County which has a population of approximately 91,000.

In 1998, New Castle was a host city for the History Channel Great Race. Over 15,000 spectators gathered downtown for the festivities. The city celebrated its 200th birthday in 1998 with a downtown fireworks festival that attracted over 30,000 people.

The Lawrence County Courthouse, North Hill Historic District, and Scottish Rite Cathedral are listed on the National Register of Historic Places.

==== 21st century ====
On February 21, 2026, Pyrotecnico set a Guinness World Record for the largest daytime pyrotechnic display, using over 1000 drones and custom smoke effects to create an American flag 600 feet wide over a public event. This has gained the city the nickname of "Fireworks Capital of America". New Castle has opened Zambelli Plaza near the Cascade Center in 2007 in honor of the Zambelli family's accomplishments.

== Geography ==
New Castle is located in the center of Lawrence County at 40°58′50″N 80°20′40″W (40.997325, −80.344556), along the Shenango River at the mouth of Neshannock Creek.

According to the U.S. Census Bureau, the city has a total area of 8.5 square miles (22.1 km^{2}), of which 8.3 square miles (21.5 km^{2}) are land and 0.2 square miles (0.6 km^{2}), or 2.78%, are water. Via the Shenango River, the city is part of the Beaver River watershed, flowing south to the Ohio River.

=== Climate ===
According to the Köppen Climate Classification system, New Castle has a humid subtropical climate, abbreviated "Cfa" on climate maps. The hottest temperature recorded in New Castle was 105 °F (40.6 °C) on July 23, 2011, while the coldest temperature recorded was −27 °F (−32.8 °C) on January 19, 1994.

Climate data for New Castle, Pennsylvania, 1991–2020 normals, extremes 1894–2020
Month	Jan	Feb	Mar	Apr	May	Jun	Jul	Aug	Sep	Oct	Nov	Dec	Year
Record high °F (°C)	75 (24)	75 (24)	85 (29)	95 (35)	95 (35)	99 (37)	105 (41)	104 (40)	100 (38)	91 (33)	83 (28)	76 (24)	105 (41)
Mean maximum °F (°C)	60.9 (16.1)	62.7 (17.1)	73.8 (23.2)	82.5 (28.1)	87.7 (30.9)	92.4 (33.6)	94.2 (34.6)	93.1 (33.9)	90.6 (32.6)	83.0 (28.3)	73.1 (22.8)	61.4 (16.3)	95.5 (35.3)
Mean daily maximum °F (°C)	36.9 (2.7)	39.7 (4.3)	49.2 (9.6)	62.9 (17.2)	73.3 (22.9)	81.5 (27.5)	85.9 (29.9)	84.8 (29.3)	78.6 (25.9)	66.3 (19.1)	53.1 (11.7)	41.8 (5.4)	62.8 (17.1)
Daily mean °F (°C)	27.9 (−2.3)	29.6 (−1.3)	37.8 (3.2)	49.4 (9.7)	60.1 (15.6)	68.8 (20.4)	73.1 (22.8)	71.9 (22.2)	65.4 (18.6)	53.8 (12.1)	42.4 (5.8)	33.3 (0.7)	51.1 (10.6)
Mean daily minimum °F (°C)	19.0 (−7.2)	19.5 (−6.9)	26.5 (−3.1)	35.9 (2.2)	46.8 (8.2)	56.1 (13.4)	60.4 (15.8)	58.9 (14.9)	52.2 (11.2)	41.2 (5.1)	37.9 (3.3)	24.9 (−3.9)	39.9 (4.4)
Mean minimum °F (°C)	−1.2 (−18.4)	2.7 (−16.3)	8.7 (−12.9)	23.0 (−5.0)	33.0 (0.6)	42.7 (5.9)	49.1 (9.5)	48.1 (8.9)	39.9 (4.4)	28.8 (−1.8)	19.6 (−6.9)	9.7 (−12.4)	−4.1 (−20.1)
Record low °F (°C)	−27 (−33)	−23 (−31)	−19 (−28)	3 (−16)	21 (−6)	30 (−1)	38 (3)	32 (0)	26 (−3)	17 (−8)	−1 (−18)	−17 (−27)	−27 (−33)
Average precipitation inches (mm)	2.86 (73)	2.20 (56)	3.08 (78)	3.65 (93)	3.89 (99)	4.47 (114)	4.55 (116)	3.91 (99)	3.86 (98)	3.22 (82)	2.96 (75)	3.13 (80)	41.78 (1,063)
Average snowfall inches (cm)	10.1 (26)	7.7 (20)	3.7 (9.4)	0.3 (0.76)	0.0 (0.0)	0.0 (0.0)	0.0 (0.0)	0.0 (0.0)	0.0 (0.0)	0.0 (0.0)	0.8 (2.0)	4.9 (12)	27.5 (70.16)
Average precipitation days (≥ 0.01 in)	15.9	12.3	12.3	14.7	14.4	13.0	11.9	11.3	10.6	12.4	12.9	14.0	155.7
Average snowy days (≥ 0.1 in)	7.9	5.6	2.8	0.3	0.0	0.0	0.0	0.0	0.0	0.0	1.0	4.3	21.9
Source 1: NOAA
Source 2: National Weather Service

=== Surrounding and adjacent neighborhoods ===
New Castle has six land borders with townships: Neshannock Township to the north, Hickory Township to the northeast, Shenango Township to the southeast, Taylor Township to the south-southwest, North Beaver Township to the southwest, and Union Township to the west. Also to the south is the border with South New Castle.

== Demographics ==
Historical population
Census	Pop.	Note	%±
1840	611		—
1850	1,614		164.2%
1860	1,882		16.6%
1870	6,164		227.5%
1880	8,418		36.6%
1890	11,600		37.8%
1900	28,339		144.3%
1910	36,280		28.0%
1920	44,938		23.9%
1930	48,674		8.3%
1940	47,638		−2.1%
1950	48,834		2.5%
1960	44,790		−8.3%
1970	38,559		−13.9%
1980	33,621		−12.8%
1990	28,334		−15.7%
2000	26,309		−7.1%
2010	23,273		−11.5%
2020	21,926		−5.8%

=== 2020 census ===
As of the 2020 census, New Castle had a population of 21,926. The median age was 41.2 years. 21.9% of residents were under the age of 18 and 19.7% of residents were 65 years of age or older. For every 100 females there were 92.6 males, and for every 100 females age 18 and over there were 90.1 males age 18 and over.

99.7% of residents lived in urban areas, while 0.3% lived in rural areas.

There were 9,338 households in New Castle, of which 26.0% had children under the age of 18 living in them. Of all households, 30.3% were married-couple households, 23.2% were households with a male householder and no spouse or partner present, and 37.1% were households with a female householder and no spouse or partner present. About 36.8% of all households were made up of individuals and 15.6% had someone living alone who was 65 years of age or older.

There were 10,650 housing units, of which 12.3% were vacant. The homeowner vacancy rate was 3.3% and the rental vacancy rate was 9.2%.

Racial composition as of the 2020 census
Race	Number	Percent
White	16,515	75.3%
Black or African American	2,954	13.5%
American Indian and Alaska Native	51	0.2%
Asian	67	0.3%
Native Hawaiian and Other Pacific Islander	0	0.0%
Some other race	379	1.7%
Two or more races	1,960	8.9%
Hispanic or Latino (of any race)	847	3.9%

=== 2010 census ===
As of the 2010 census, there were 23,273 people, 9,765 households, and 5,793 families residing in the city. The population density was 2,725.2 people per square mile. There were 11,304 housing units at an average density of 1,323.7 per square mile. 1,539 housing units were vacant. The racial makeup of the city was 83.2% White, 12.2% African American, 0.1% Native American, 0.4% Asian, 0.1% Pacific Islander, 0.4% from other races, and 3.7% from two or more races. Hispanic or Latino of any race were 1.6% of the population.

There were 9,765 households, out of which 24.5% had children under the age of 18 living with them, 34.8% were married couples living together, 18.6% had a female householder with no husband present, and 40.7% were non-families. 28.4% of all households contained individuals under 18, and 15.9% had someone living alone who was 65 years of age or older. The average household size was 2.3 and the average family size was 2.98.

In the city, the population was spread out, with 25.1% under the age of 20, 5.9% from 20 to 24, 24.0% from 25 to 44, 26.7% from 45 to 64, and 18.3% who were 65 years of age or older. The median age was 40.8 years old. For every 100 females, there were 85.3 males.

=== 2017 American Community Survey ===
As of 2017 American Community Survey estimates, the median income for a household in the city was $31,044, and the median income for a family was $42,807. The per capita income for the city was $13,730. About 23.3% of families and 27.2% of the population were below the poverty line, including 40.8% of those under age 18 and 15.4% of those age 65 or over.

== Economy ==
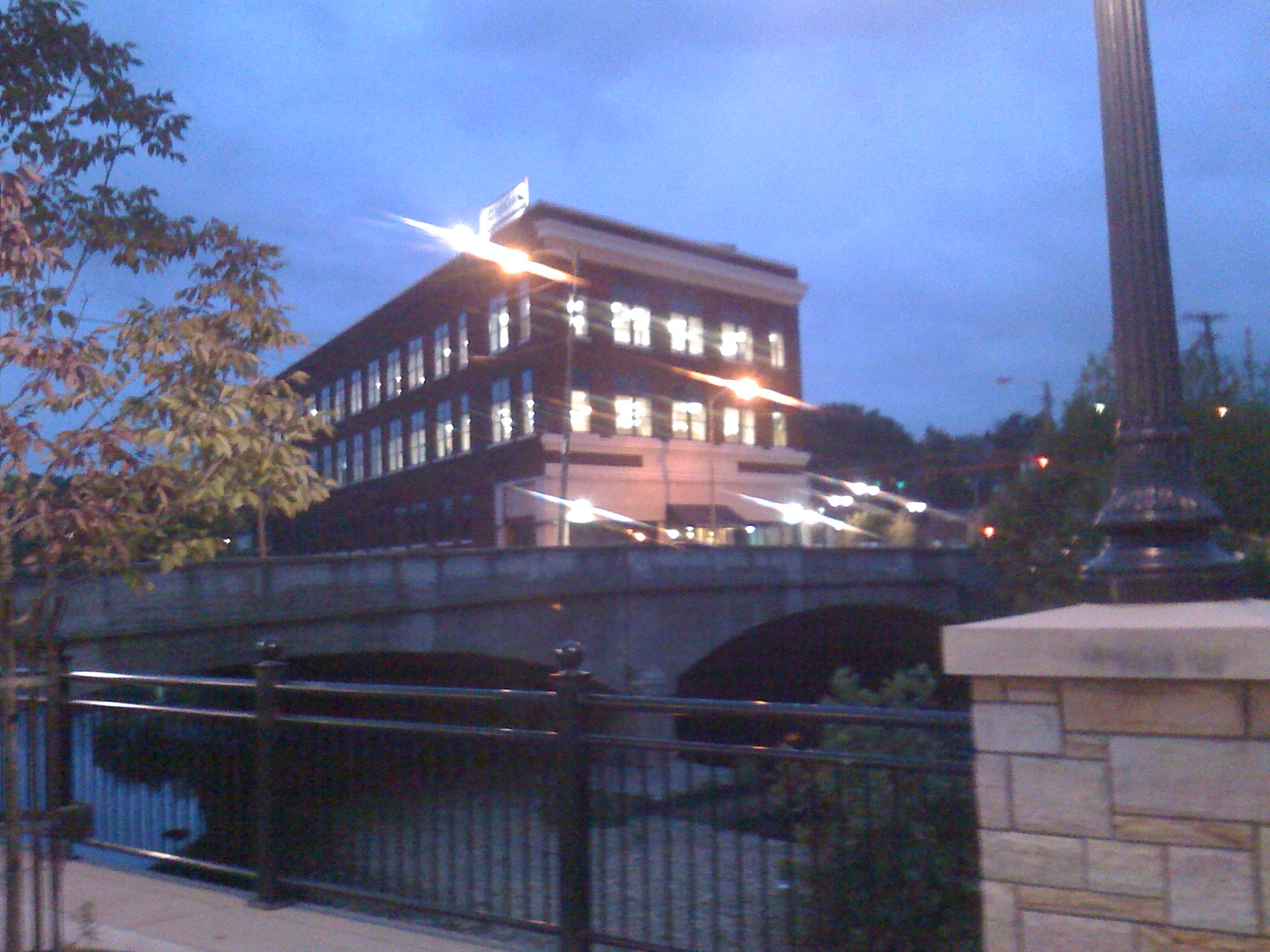
The Pier I Complex Building in downtown New Castle

Downtown New Castle underwent a redevelopment centered around the Cascade Center. The downtown streets and sidewalks were rebuilt in the early 21st century in earlier styles. The revitalization of downtown also saw two major routes into the city, Pennsylvania Route 65 and U.S. Route 224, which had both had their termini extended into downtown in 2007.

InfoCision, a telemarketing services company, restored the former New Castle Dry Goods Co. building, into which it relocated its offices from their former location inside Cascade Galleria. The building had been vacant since the late 1980s when the Troutman's department store closed. The building is now known as the Pier I Complex Building.

The downtown area has also become the home of several bank offices, hosting the regional headquarters of Huntington and First Commonwealth (all descended from banks formerly based in the city but later acquired) as well as branches for PNC Bank and First National Bank. FirstMerit also had its regional headquarters in New Castle prior to their acquisition by Huntington, and that building is expected to be torn down in 2020. Mellon Bank also had offices across the street from the current Zambelli Plaza before selling off its New Castle-area branches to First National Bank, which closed the office building since it already had the aforementioned branch in downtown.

As of 2018, New Castle employed 8,677 people. Industries employing the most were healthcare, social assistance, utilities, transportation and warehouses. Healthcare and social assistance employed 1,724 people, followed by retail trade with 1,172 employees and then manufacturing employing 1,012 employees. The highest paying occupations in this area are utility positions, having a median income of $72,917; professional scientific and technical services, with a median income of $45,125; and educational services, with a median income of $40,469. The current poverty rate in this city is 27.4%, with a median household income of $31,557. The 2017 unemployment rate was 8.1%, greater than the U.S. average of 5.2%. Over the past 40 years, New Castle has been transformed from an industrial economy to a more balanced economy based on manufacturing, retail, and service-related businesses. Many buildings and old homes were being renovated by incoming residents.

=== Taxes ===
The current U.S. average sales tax rate was 6.0%, the same as New Castle's sales tax rate at 6.0%. The U.S. average income tax rate was 4.6%, slightly less than New Castle's 5.2%.

=== Income ===
Per year, the average income of a New Castle resident was $18,463 and the U.S. average income per resident was $28,555 per year. The median household income for a New Castle resident was $29,762. This came up short of the U.S. average at $53,482 a year. The current poverty rate in New Castle was 27.4%, much higher than the average for Pennsylvania at 13.3%.

White workers made 1.66 times the amount of salary that African American workers made. African Americans make the second highest salary of any race or ethnicity in New Castle.

== Arts and culture ==
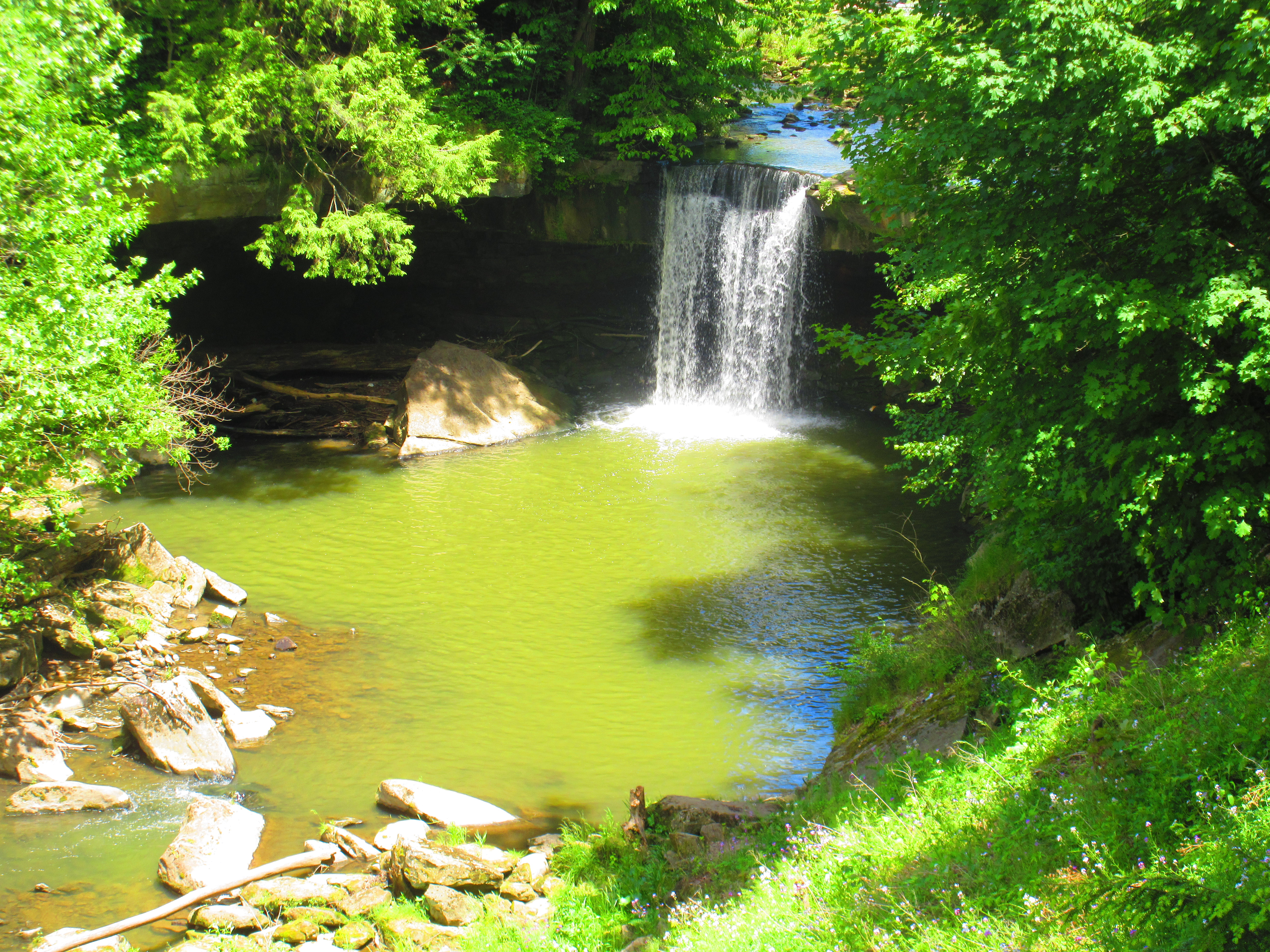
Waterfall at Cascade Park. A roller coaster once crossed the waterway just downstream from the falls.

The city was the site of an important development in the history of the Warner Bros. empire, given that the first Warner Brothers' theater, the Cascade, opened here in 1907. The building was nearly condemned in 1996 after a wall fell on the sidewalk. Warner Bros. donated $150,000, which the Pennsylvania government matched, to restore the facade. Municipal officials have planned recent revitalization efforts around the historic site. The Cascade Center currently features two restaurants and a local stage theater, and plans are in progress to turn the complex into New Castle's version of Station Square in Pittsburgh.

The Cascade Center is named after Cascade Park, located on the outskirts of the city's East Side in Shenango Township along Pennsylvania Route 65. A former trolley park, it was restored and converted into a regular outdoor park in the 1980s with a few historical buildings as well as the park's entrance sign restored, avoiding the fate of nearby Idora Park in Youngstown. The park hosts the annual "Back to the 50s Weekend" classic car show, and previously hosted the similarly themed "Thunder in the Cascades" motorcycle show.

The New Castle Playhouse, a community theater, is located along Long Avenue and puts on several shows a year. It is one of only a few such theaters between Youngstown and Pittsburgh. The Old Princeton School, located nearby, has been the venue for rock concerts.

In the 2011 movie Super 8, New Castle is referenced as the "fireworks capital of the world".

New Castle is the subject of the true crime blog "Small Town Noir", which uses mug shots taken in New Castle between 1930 and 1960, and which were rescued when the town's police department threw them out. The information on the images comes from the New Castle News.

New Castle has a large Arab-American population whose culture is visible throughout the community. Large numbers of Lebanese and Syrian immigrants were attracted by the city's prosperity in the late 19th and early 20th centuries. Their culture is especially visible in the local cuisine, which makes popular use of items such as stuffed grape leaves, lamb on the rod, kibbe, and garlic sauce. Although many other Rust Belt cities contain large Arab-American populations, New Castle is unique for its large population of Alawite Muslims from Syria. The Muslim community of the city has a mosque on the East Side of town.

=== North Hill Historic District ===
In 2000, nearly 450 acres (180 ha) of northern New Castle were listed on the National Register of Historic Places as a historic district. The district consists of 91 blocks between Falls Street near downtown New Castle to Fairmont Avenue near Neshannock Township. Its buildings include late 19th century, early 20th century, late Victorian, and late 19th and 20th century revival styles. Some of these buildings have been torn down since its addition to the register, with the most notable examples being torn down for the construction of the New Castle High School and the construction of a Speedway gas station.

=== International relations ===
The town is part of a worldwide network of towns and cities with the name Newcastle. These include cities in Australia, Canada, Czech Republic, Denmark, Georgia (country), Germany, Indiana, Japan, Latvia, Malaysia, Montenegro, Slovakia, South Africa, Switzerland, and the United Kingdom. Representatives from New Castle have attended the bi-annual Newcastles of the World summit since 1998.

== Education ==
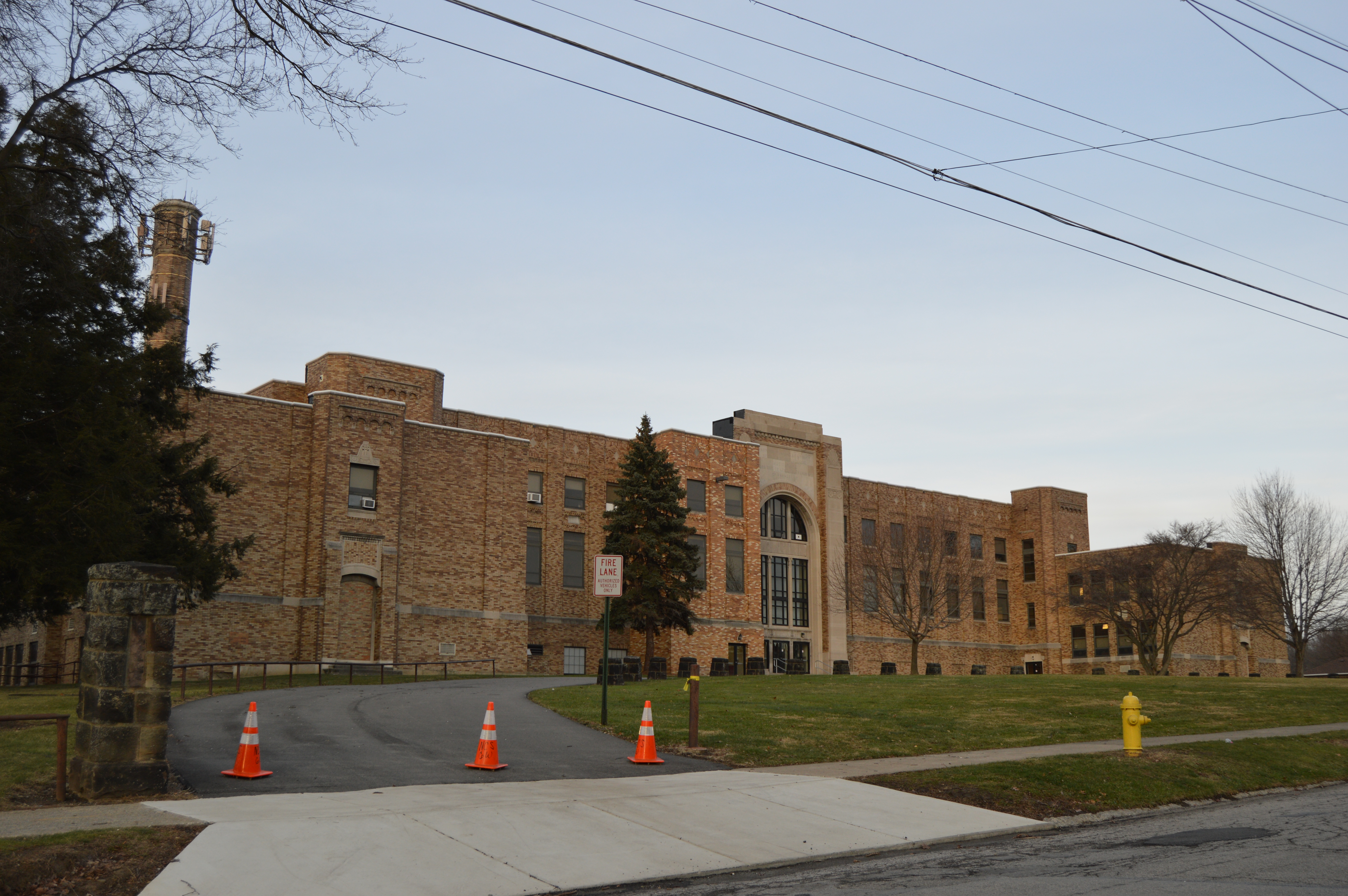
George Washington Intermediate School

=== Primary and secondary ===
The city is served by the New Castle Area School District, which also serves nearby Taylor Township, including West Pittsburg . The Lawrence County Career and Technical Center is located in the city. As of 2017 the school district consisted of Croton Pre-Kindergarten Center, Harry W. Lockley Early Learning Center (K-2), George Washington Intermediate School (3-5), and New Castle Junior/Senior High School (6-12).

New Castle Christian Academy on Albert Street between Sumner Avenue and Clen-Moore Boulevard serves students from Pre-K to 9th grade. St. Vitus Catholic School on South Jefferson Street and Home Street serves students from Pre-K to 8th grade.

=== Post-secondary ===
New Castle is primarily served by five post-secondary education facilities: the New Castle Beauty School for cosmetology students in downtown, the New Castle School of Trades for technical trades in Pulaski Township, the Jameson School of Nursing (owned and operated by UPMC Jameson) within the city, and the Lawrence County branch of Butler County Community College, which opened in 2008 in Union Township and serves as a primary community college to Lawrence County.

== Media ==
=== Newspaper ===
The city is served by the New Castle News, a newspaper published daily except for Tuesdays and Sundays.

=== Television ===
The New Castle area is served by both the Pittsburgh and Youngstown television markets, with regular news coverage in the area from both. Despite being considerably closer to Youngstown, New Castle is part of the Pittsburgh designated market area by Nielsen Media Research. New Castle was home to the first ABC television affiliate in Western Pennsylvania when FCC channel 45 WKST-TV signed on in 1953, as WTAE-TV in Pittsburgh did not sign on until 1958 and WJET-TV did not sign on in Erie until 1966. The station moved its license to Youngstown in 1964, moved to channel 33, and changed its call sign to WYTV.

The WNWW radio and cable television channel at Westminster College in New Wilmington operates channel 183 on Comcast cable, currently the only television broadcast outlet in Lawrence County.

In the 1990s, WBGN-TV low-power TV stations were established between Youngstown and Pittsburgh. Later, Michael Dell bought the station and moved it to Cranberry Township, Pennsylvania. WEPA-CD, a low-power television station (channel 16, virtual 59) licensed to serve, which held the call sign WBGN-LP, WBGN-LD, or WBGN-CD from 1998 to 2014.

=== Radio ===
Radio stations, however, are part of the Youngstown radio market according to Arbitron ratings, even though some Pittsburgh-area radio stations can easily be heard within the area. New Castle is home to two commercial AM radio stations: talk radio station WKST 1200 and sports talk station WUZZ AM 1280, the latter being a Fox Sports Radio affiliate. For FM radio, WKPL FM 92.1 The Pickle, first a full-time country music station called WFEM or C92 then rebranded as Classic Gold an oldies station, was licensed in New Castle before its license was moved back to Ellwood City in 2004, though it still includes New Castle as one of its local communities as part of its FCC-mandated station identification. The AM stations are owned by Altoona-based Forever Broadcasting, LLC while classic rock station WKPL 92.1 FM is owned by Froggy parent Keymarket Communications of Pittsburgh.

WLDJ, a not-for-profit community radio station, also broadcasts out of New Castle. NCRadio450 operates as an internet radio station from NCTV45.com, focused on playing music highlighting the original songs of local/regional bands.

== Infrastructure ==
=== Transportation ===
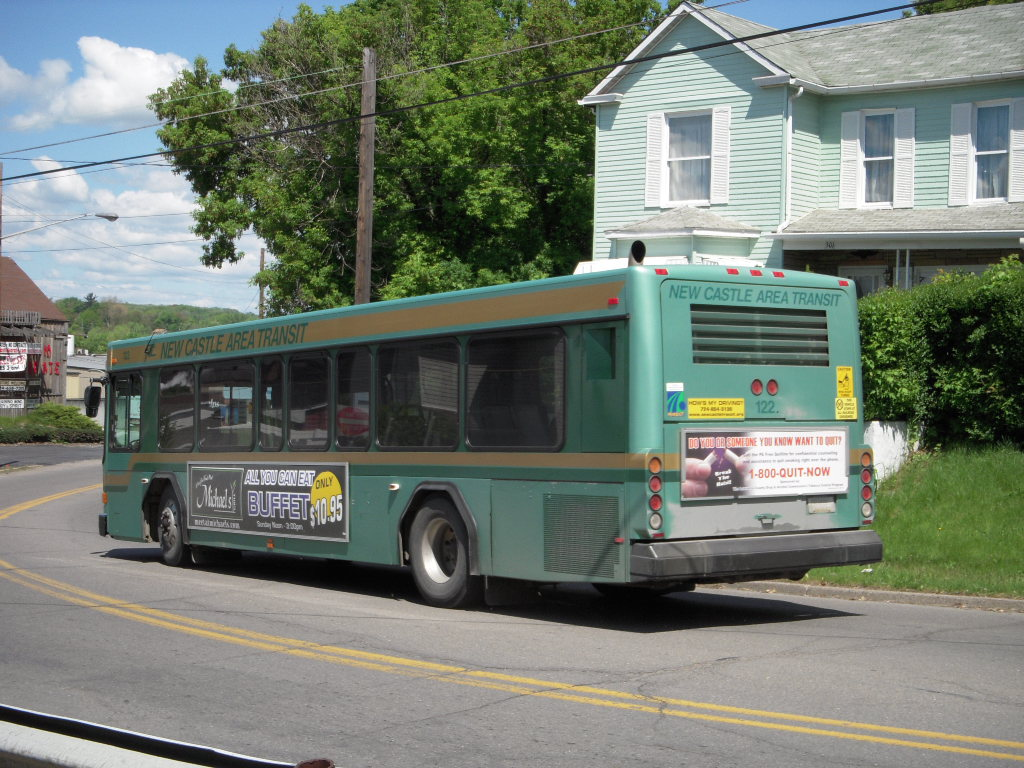
New Castle Transit Authority bus

New Castle has public transportation in the form of the New Castle Transit Authority, which provides bus service to patrons around the city and makes three daily trips to Pittsburgh.

The city is served by numerous highways, with Pennsylvania Route 18 and U.S. Route 422 being the major routes running through the city, while Interstate 376 passes to the west of the city. Two more major routes — Pennsylvania Route 65 and U.S. Route 224 — terminate in the city. Pennsylvania Route 108 and Pennsylvania Route 168 also run through the city. U.S. 422 Business, a former alignment of U.S. 422, runs through the city, ending on each side of the city when the main 422 leaves the New Castle Bypass. I-376 and U.S. 422 are briefly concurrent with each other on the New Castle Bypass, though south of New Castle until Chippewa Township near Beaver Falls, I-376 is tolled by the Pennsylvania Turnpike Commission. The city is located 12 miles (19 km) west of Interstate 79, 14 miles (23 km) south of Interstate 80, and 13 miles (21 km) north of Interstate 76, the Pennsylvania Turnpike.

The closest airport is the New Castle Municipal Airport, with no commercial service. Most residents of New Castle use Pittsburgh International Airport which is about 42 miles (68 km) south of downtown. Also, Youngstown-Warren Regional Airport, Akron-Canton Airport, and Cleveland Hopkins International Airport, are all within 100 miles (160 km) of the city center.

=== Healthcare ===
New Castle's only hospital is UPMC Jameson, located at the intersection of Wilmington Avenue and Garfield Avenue.

Medicare reimbursements per enrollee were $11,153 in 2014, but $11,196 in 2013. Medicare reimbursements per enrollee in Lawrence County are $1,565 more than national average.
