= New Castle Armory =

- U.S. National Register of Historic Places
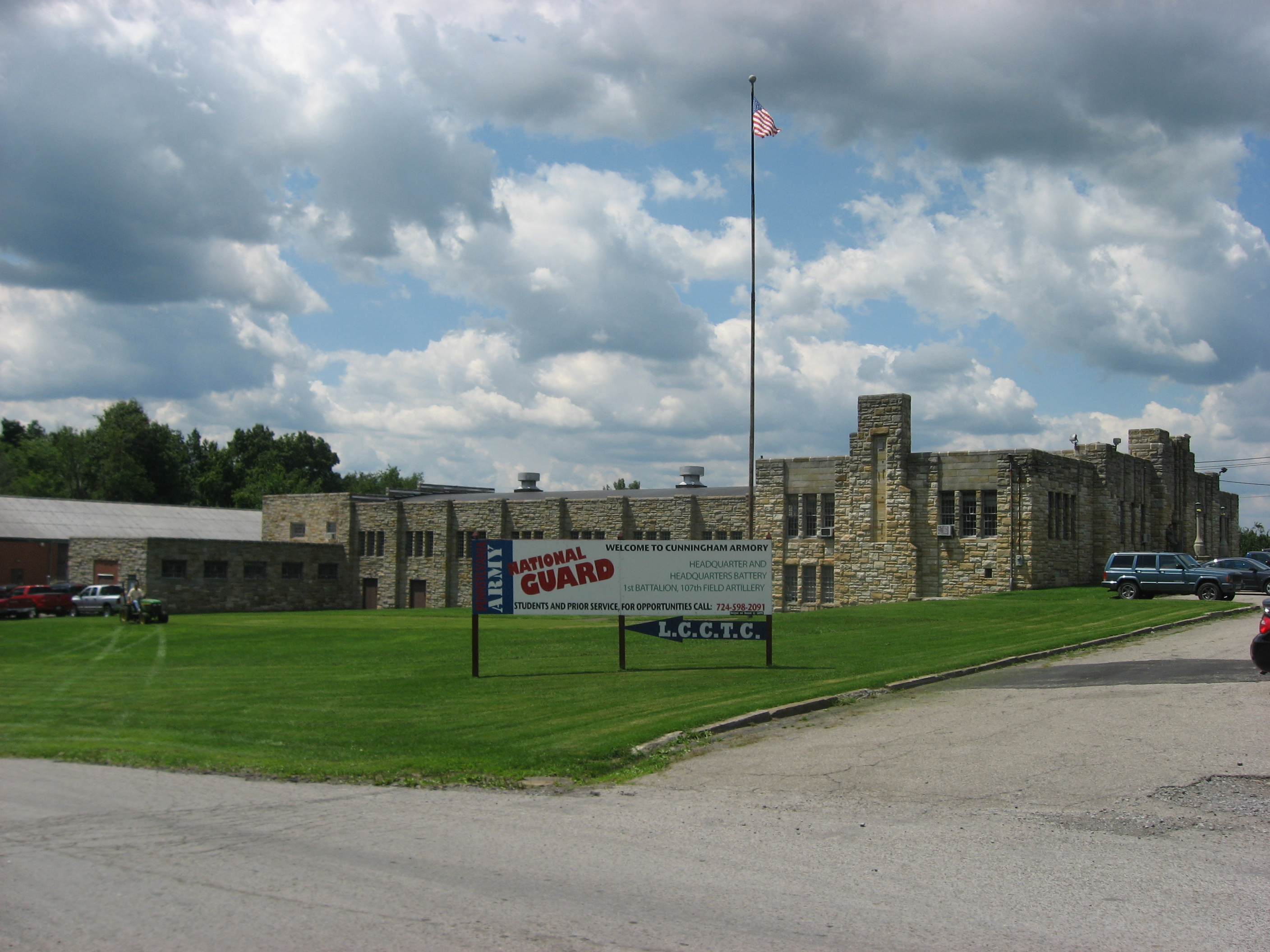
- New Castle Armory, August 2009

- Location within Pennsylvania Location within the United States
- Location: 820 Frank Avenue, Shenango Township, Pennsylvania
- Coordinates: 40°58′45″N 80°19′30″W
- Area: 6 acres (2.4 ha)
- Built: 1938
- Architect: Thayer Co.
- Architectural style: Art Deco
- MPS: Pennsylvania National Guard Armories MPS
- NRHP reference No.: 91000516
- Added to NRHP: May 9, 1991

New Castle Armory is a historic National Guard armory located at Shenango Township, Lawrence County, Pennsylvania. It was built in 1938, and is an "I"-plan stone building consisting of a one- to two-story administration building, with a connected riding hall and former stable building. It was built as a Federal public works project and is in the Art Deco style.

It was added to the National Register of Historic Places in 1991.
