= Pennsylvania's 37th Senate district =

American legislative district

Pennsylvania's 37th State Senate district
Senator
Devlin Robinson; R–Bridgeville
- Population (2021): 248,858

Pennsylvania State Senate District 37 includes part of Allegheny County. It is currently represented by Republican Devlin Robinson.

== District profile ==
The district includes the following areas:

- Aleppo Township
- Bell Acres
- Ben Avon Heights
- Bethel Park
- Bradford Woods
- Bridgeville
- Collier Township
- Coraopolis
- Crescent Township
- Edgeworth
- Findlay Township
- Franklin Park
- Glen Osborne
- Glenfield
- Haysville
- Heidelberg
- Jefferson Hills
- Kilbuck Township
- Leet Township
- Leetsdale
- Marshall Township
- McDonald (Allegheny County portion)
- Moon Township
- North Fayette Township
- Oakdale
- Ohio Township
- Pennsbury Village
- Pleasant Hills
- Robinson Township
- Rosslyn Farms
- Sewickley
- Sewickley Heights
- Sewickley Hills
- South Fayette Township
- South Park Township
- Thornburg
- Upper St. Clair Township

== Senators ==
Representative	Party	Years	District home	Note	Counties
Wayne S. Ewing	Republican	1969–1976			Allegheny (part)
Michael P. Schaefer	Democratic	1977–1980			Allegheny (part)
D. Michael Fisher	Republican	1981–1982			Allegheny (part)
D. Michael Fisher	Republican	1983–1996			Allegheny (part), Washington (part)
Timothy F. Murphy	Republican	1997–2003		Resigned January 3, 2003.	Allegheny (part), Washington (part)
John R. Pippy	Republican	2003–2012		Elected March 11, 2003 to fill vacancy. Resigned June 30, 2012.	Allegheny (part), Washington (part)
Matthew H. Smith	Democratic	2013–2015	Mt. Lebanon	Resigned June 2015	Allegheny (part), Washington (part)
Guy Reschenthaler	Republican	2015–2019	Jefferson Hills	Elected November 3, 2015 to fill vacancy. Elected to the US House of Representatives.	Allegheny (part), Washington (part)
Pam Iovino	Democratic	2019–2020	Mt. Lebanon	Elected April 2, 2019 to fill vacancy. Lost re-election	Allegheny (part), Washington (part)
Devlin Robinson	Republican	2021–Present		Incumbent	Allegheny (part), Washington (part)

== Recent election results ==
2020 election
Party	Candidate	Votes	%
Republican	Devlin Robinson	92,027	52.1
Democratic	Pam Iovino (incumbent)	84,582	47.9
Total votes		176,609	100.0
Republican gain from Democratic			

2019 special election
Party	Candidate	Votes	%
Democratic	Pam Iovino	33,401	52.0
Republican	D. Raja	30,854	48.0
Total votes		64,255	100.0
Democratic gain from Republican			

2016 election
Party	Candidate	Votes	%
Republican	Guy Reschenthaler (incumbent)	90,987	60.6
Democratic	Edward Eichenlaub	59,044	39.4
Total votes		150,031	100.0
Republican hold			

2015 special election
Party	Candidate	Votes	%
Republican	Guy Reschenthaler	30,565	55.1
Democratic	Heather Arnet	24,888	44.9
Total votes		55,453	100.0
Republican gain from Democratic			

2012 election
Party	Candidate	Votes	%
Democratic	Matthew H. Smith	70,883	52.6
Republican	D. Raja	63,854	47.4
Total votes		134,737	100.0
Democratic gain from Republican			
