= Sewickley Public Library =

Public Library in Sewickley, Pennsylvania

Sewickley Public Library of the Quaker Valley School District
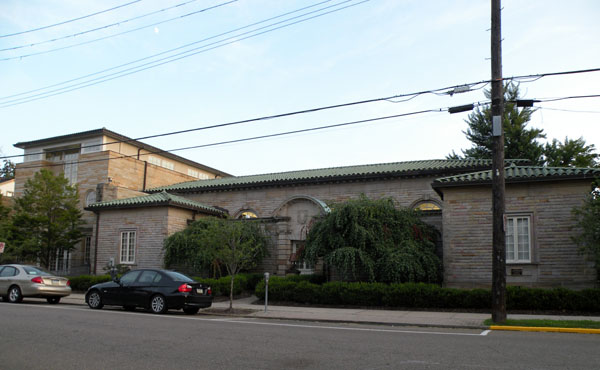
- Sewickley Public Library, located at 500 Thorn Street in Sewickley, Pennsylvania
- 40°32′19.32″N 80°10′53.4″W
- Location: Sewickley, Pennsylvania, United States
- Established: 1873

Collection
- Size: 94,766

Access and use
- Circulation: 374,711
- Population served: 13,934
- Members: 8,003

Other information
- Budget: $987,000
- Director: Ruth M. Neely
- Employees: 35
- Website: http://www.sewickleylibrary.org

Pittsburgh Landmark – PHLF
- Designated: 2003

The Sewickley Public Library is the public library serving the Quaker Valley School District and is the oldest public library in Allegheny County. The library can be found in Sewickley, Pennsylvania, a borough that is located 12 miles (19 km) west northwest of Pittsburgh along the Ohio River. A community and cultural resource since 1873, the Sewickley Public Library was established to provide free service to residents of the Quaker Valley School District, Allegheny County residents, and qualified non-residents. The Library offers a variety of materials and services. Owning over 90,000 titles – housing an ever-growing collection of fiction and non-fiction books, DVDs, music CDs, audio books, and magazines – the library also has access to the materials of all other participating Allegheny County Library Association libraries.

Major funding for the library is provided by the Quaker Valley School District. Partial funding is provided by the Allegheny Regional Asset District and the Commonwealth of Pennsylvania.

== Special services ==
- The library is open 7 days a week and offers free parking.
- A book drop is located in the back of the building and is accessible 24 hours a day.
- Free use of all PC computers, which include word processing and other software for public use
- Free WI-FI, Internet access, and access to extensive online databases
- Access to most public library collections in Allegheny County
- Children's, young adult, and adult educational and recreational programming
- Homebound delivery
- Meeting and study rooms
- Sewickley Public Library is a fine-free library. The library does not charge late/overdue fines on loaned items.

== History ==
According to Bayard H. Christy in a report prepared for the Home and School Association of Sewickley on November 8, 1912, the Sewickley Public Library owes its origins to the arrival of a whiskey boat at the Saw Mill landing one Saturday evening in the winter of 1872–73. "The consequent riot and disorder...led some, interested in the welfare of the young men, to think that such things would not be, had we a place for proper and rational amusement and self-improvement."

The Young Men's Library Association was formed in 1873 and rented a room for library services at the Mozart Hall (corner of Beaver and Broad Streets). It was later moved to a building next door called Choral Hall. In 1880 the property of the library was transferred to the Sewickley School Board under the general school laws of the state.

In 1923 the library formally moved to its present location, a building given by William L. Clause in memory of his wife, Elizabeth Ann Clause.

In the dedication address by Clause, he stated, "In presenting this library, it is my desire that it should be the property of the entire valley, yet under the existing conditions, there is no way this can be done, as there is no way the matter can be handled except to deed it to the School District of the borough of Sewickley. Of course if the boroughs ever become consolidated, or if the school districts are ever consolidated, that would solve this problem."

In the ensuing years, Osborne and Edgeworth School Districts also supported the library until 1956 at which time a jointure of eleven municipalities comprising Aleppo, Bell Acres, Edgeworth, Glenfield, Haysville, Leet, Leetsdale, Glen Osborne, Sewickley, Sewickley Heights and Sewickley Hills, formed the Quaker Valley School District. In 1967, the Quaker Valley School District Board of Directors designated the Sewickley Public Library as its agency to provide public library service to Quaker Valley School District residents and taxpayers and resolved to maintain or assist in the maintenance of the library.

The building was awarded Historic Landmark status by the Pittsburgh History and Landmarks Foundation in 2003.

== Awards and recognition ==
- Sewickley Public Library is ranked as one of the country's finest public libraries. Library Journal (LJ) rates and recognizes America's Star Libraries, and SPL has earned rankings seven times (2021, 2020, 2013, 2011, 2010, 2009, and 2008). LJ evaluates over 7,000 public libraries across the nation and selects under 300 libraries as providing quality service and excellent value. They chose an index of public library output based upon four related per capita output indicators: visits, circulation, program attendance, and public Internet computer use for libraries at various budget levels.
- Sewickley Public Library is continuously one of the top 25 largest libraries in the Pittsburgh Business Times' Book of Lists.
- The Sewickley Public Library was awarded Gold Star status through the PA Forward Star Program.
