= Pittsburgh–New Castle–Weirton combined statistical area =

Metropolitan area in the United States

Greater Pittsburgh Pittsburgh, PA Combined Statistical Area
- Combined Statistical Area
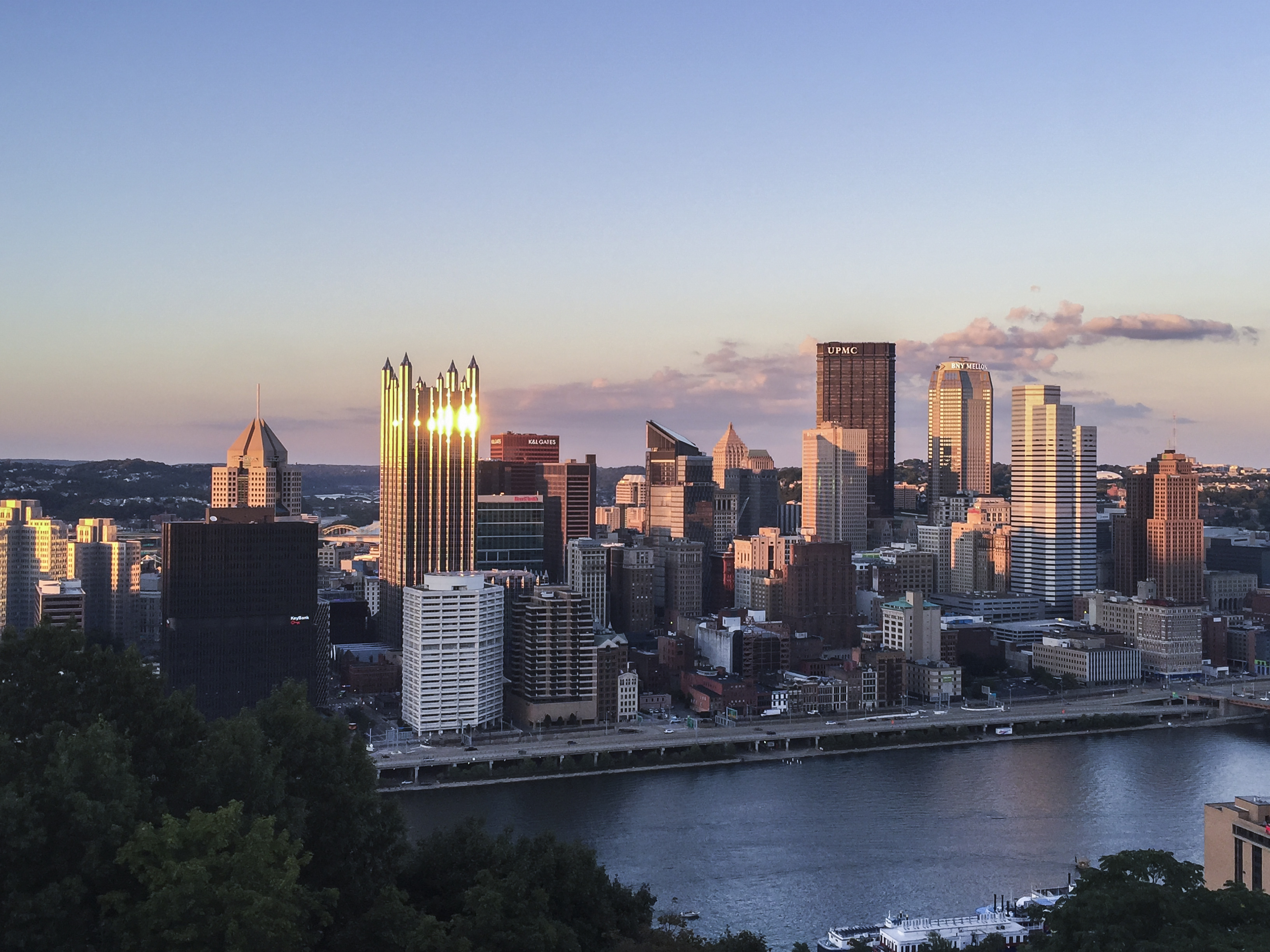
- Downtown Pittsburgh seen from Mount Washington in September 2018
Pittsburgh–Weirton–Steubenville, PA–WV-OH CSA
City of Pittsburgh
Pittsburgh, PA MSA
Weirton–Steubenville, WV-OH MSA
Hermitage, PA µSA
Indiana, PA µSA
- Coordinates: 40°27′N 79°59′W
- Country: United States
- State: Pennsylvania; Ohio; West Virginia
- Largest city: Pittsburgh

Population
  - Total: 2,370,930
  - Rank: 27th in the U.S.
- Time zone: UTC−05:00 (Eastern Standard Time)
  - Summer (DST): UTC−04:00 (Eastern Daylight Time)

The Pittsburgh–Weirton–Steubenville, PA–WV–OH Combined Statistical Area is a 13-county combined statistical area (CSA) in the United States. The largest and principal city in the area is Pittsburgh, Pennsylvania, but the CSA includes population centers from three states: Pennsylvania, West Virginia, and Ohio.

The statistical area was officially defined by the U.S. Census Bureau in 2013 and revised in 2023. The estimated population of the area was 2,635,228 in mid-2016.

== Boundaries ==
Pittsburgh, Pennsylvania, seen here at night in November 2015, is the largest city in the Pittsburgh–Weirton–Steubenville combined statistical area

The following metropolitan and micropolitan statistical areas form the Pittsburgh–Weirton–Steubenville, PA–OH–WV combined statistical area.

=== Pittsburgh, PA Metropolitan Statistical Area ===
- Allegheny County, PA
- Armstrong County, PA
- Beaver County, PA
- Butler County, PA
- Lawrence County, PA
- Fayette County, PA
- Washington County, PA
- Westmoreland County, PA

=== Weirton–Steubenville, WV–OH Metropolitan Statistical Area ===
- Brooke County, WV
- Hancock County, WV
- Jefferson County, OH

=== Hermitage, PA Micropolitan Statistical Area ===
- Mercer County, PA

=== Indiana, PA Micropolitan Statistical Area ===
- Indiana County, PA

== Principal cities and towns ==
Largest municipalities by population (Pittsburgh–Weirton–Steubenville, PA–OH–WV CSA)
Rank	Name	Type	County	State	Population (2018–24)
1	Pittsburgh	City	Allegheny	PA	302,971
2	Hempfield	Township	Westmoreland	PA	41,664
3	Penn Hills	Township	Allegheny	PA	40,974
4	Mount Lebanon	Township	Allegheny	PA	34,075
5	Cranberry	Township	Butler	PA	33,955
6	Bethel Park	Borough	Allegheny	PA	33,577
7	Ross	Township	Allegheny	PA	33,176
8	North Huntingdon	Township	Westmoreland	PA	31,757
9	McCandless	Township	Allegheny	PA	29,038
10	Monroeville	Municipality	Allegheny	PA	28,640
11	Shaler	Township	Allegheny	PA	28,132
12	Plum	Borough	Allegheny	PA	27,144
13	Moon	Township	Allegheny	PA	26,782
14	Peters	Township	Washington	PA	23,248
15	New Castle	City	Lawrence	PA	21,926
16	Unity	Township	Westmoreland	PA	21,599
17	Baldwin	Borough	Allegheny	PA	21,510
18	Upper St. Clair	Township	Allegheny	PA	21,160
19	Murrysville	Municipality	Westmoreland	PA	21,006
20	Penn	Township	Westmoreland	PA	20,346
21	West Mifflin	Borough	Allegheny	PA	19,699
22	Weirton	City	Hancock & Brooke	WV	18,813
23	Steubenville	City	Jefferson	OH	18,161
24	Hampton	Township	Allegheny	PA	18,125
25	McKeesport	City	Allegheny	PA	17,727

== Demographics ==
=== Ethnic diversity ===
A comparison of the White, non-Hispanic vs. non-white population in the Pittsburgh CSA vs. the entire U.S., based on 2020 and 2016 U.S. Census reports

Source: US Census Bureau, County Population by Characteristics: 2010–2016

Median household income by county subdivision in 2012-16

Median age by county in the area as of 2010-2016

Population by generation in the area in 2010–2016

Median household income by county in 2012-16

Median age by county in the area as of 2010-2016

According to the 2016 population estimates, Greater Pittsburgh is less diverse than the U.S. as a whole. Persons of color, or non-white Americans, represent only 13.5 percent of the region's population, compared to 38.7 percent in the United States overall.

The combined statistical area has, however, seen a significant increase in Asian Americans, Hispanic or Latino Americans, and Multiracial Americans since 2010. During the same period, the African-American population has remained essentially unchanged whereas the White population continues to steadily decrease.

Allegheny County, Pennsylvania is the most diverse of the twelve Pittsburgh CSA counties with persons of color representing 21 percent of the population, or 257,832 people. Armstrong County is the least diverse, with a population that is only 2.8 percent non-white.

Pittsburgh CSA population by ethnic group (2010–2016)
Ethnic group	2010 Census		2016 Estimate		2010–2016 Change	
Ethnic group	Total	%	Total	%	Total	%
White or European American	2,338,582	87.89	2,280,228	86.53	−58,354	−2.50
Black or African American	206,106	7.75	206,035	7.82	−71	−0.03
Asian American	43,236	1.62	56,801	2.15	+13,565	+31.37
Multiracial	36,403	1.37	44,613	1.69	+8,210	+22.55
Hispanic or Latino	33,097	1.24	43,518	1.65	+10,421	+31.49
American Indian and Alaska Native	2,803	0.11	3,074	0.12	+271	+9.67
Native Hawaiian and other Pacific Islander	500	0.02	959	0.04	+459	+91.80
Total	2,660,727	100.0	2,635,228	100.0	−25,499	−0.96

Results from the past four U.S. presidential elections in Pittsburgh metropolitan area

The 2012–2016 American Community Survey estimated the region's foreign-born population at 3.4 percent. The largest plurality of this group, or 48.3 percent, were born in Asia, 27.8 percent in Europe, and 13.3 percent in Latin America. A supermajority (67.3 percent) of the region's most recent international arrivals, or those entering the country since 2010, were born in Asia.

=== Age ===
Pittsburgh CSA population by age group (2010–2016)
Age group	2010 census		2016 estimate		2010–2016 change	
Age group	Total	%	Total	%	Total	%
Under 18 years	535,961	20.14	504,285	19.14	−31,676	−5.91
18–64 years	1,663,500	62.52	1,624,450	61.64	−39,050	−2.35
65 years and over	461,266	17.34	506,493	19.22	+45,227	+9.80
Total	2,660,727	100.0	2,635,228	100.0	−25,499	−0.96

Greater Pittsburgh's population has traditionally been significantly older than the United States as a whole. This is largely due to the large domestic out-migration which occurred during the steel industry's collapse in the 1970s and 1980s. Most out-migrants were working age at the time and this led to the area having a much greater than average elderly population than most areas of the country at the end of the 20th century. As of the 2012–2016 American Community Survey, Pittsburgh-New Castle-Weirton was the 11th oldest combined statistical area in the United States with a median age of 43 years. Greater Pittsburgh's population age structure is most similar to slower growing European countries such as Belgium, Finland, Greece, and Slovenia which all have similar median ages.

In recent decades, however, the growth of the oldest segments of the population has become more pronounced in the country overall and less so in Greater Pittsburgh. Between 2010 and 2016, the age 65 and over population of the region increased 9.8 percent whereas that age group grew by 22.3 percent in the United States over the same time period. Indiana and Allegheny counties, which both have significant college student populations, are the youngest counties in the region by median age and Allegheny County's median age has actually been declining in recent years. All of the remaining ten counties in the region have median ages well above the US and their respective states. Baby Boomers continue to represent the largest generational cohort in Greater Pittsburgh with 28.6 percent of the population in 2016. Millennials, along with the youngest generation, Generation Z, now represent 40.9 percent of the region's population which is roughly equal to the oldest generations (Baby Boomers, Silents, and World War II) with 41.7 percent of the population. As is the case in the United States as a whole, Millennials are now the largest generation in Allegheny and Indiana counties.

=== Income and earnings ===
Pittsburgh CSA Median household income by county American Community Survey (5-year)
CSA Rank	County	2007–2011	2012–2016	Change	
CSA Rank	County	2007–2011	2012–2016	$	%
1	Butler	$61,317	$63,345	+$2,028	+3.31
2	Washington	$55,440	$57,534	+$2,094	+3.78
	United States	$56,290	$55,322	−$968	−1.72
	Pennsylvania	$55,105	$54,895	−$210	−0.38
3	Allegheny	$53,135	$54,357	+$1,222	+2.30
4	Westmoreland	$52,254	$54,142	+$1,888	+3.61
	Pittsburgh CSA	‡	$52,764		
5	Beaver	$51,133	$51,887	+$754	+1.47
	Ohio	$51,285	$50,674	−$611	−1.19
6	Brooke	$44,212	$46,265	+$2,053	+4.64
7	Armstrong	$47,650	$45,879	−$1,771	−3.72
8	Lawrence	$46,751	$45,764	−$987	−2.11
9	Indiana	$44,194	$45,118	+$924	+2.09
	West Virginia	$42,195	$42,644	+$449	+1.06
	City of Pittsburgh	$39,646	$42,450	+$2,804	+7.07
10	Jefferson	$42,091	$42,327	+$236	+0.56
11	Fayette	$39,053	$40,511	+$1,458	+3.73
12	Hancock	$40,935	$40,316	−$619	−1.51
‡ CSA defined in 2013. Median income data is not available for the 2007–2011 ACS. † 2007–2011 figures are adjusted for inflation to compare to 2012–2016 ACS values in real terms.

The wealthiest counties by median household income in Greater Pittsburgh are Butler and Washington counties. Both counties have median incomes above those of the United States and Pennsylvania and have continued to experience strong income growth since the Great Recession and have benefited from being adjacent to many of the wealthiest suburbs in Allegheny County's in North and South Hills. Most counties in the region and the City of Pittsburgh showed reasonably strong gains in household income since the 2007–2011 American Community Survey (ACS) whereas Pennsylvania, Ohio, and the nation as a whole saw income declines over the same time period. This includes some of the less wealthy counties in the region, such as Fayette and Brooke counties. Despite this recent growth, however, the region's overall median household income remains slightly less than the United States overall.

According to the 2012–2016 ACS, there are 231 county subdivisions whose median incomes are greater or equal to the region's median ($52,274). The ten wealthiest districts are Sewickley Heights, Edgeworth, Ben Avon Heights, Fox Chapel, Sewickley Hills, Glen Osborne, Thornburg, Pine Township, Rosslyn Farms, and Franklin Park. Seven of these municipalities are in the wealthy Sewickley Valley and North Hills areas to the north and northwest of Pittsburgh and all of them are in Allegheny County. Other high income areas in the region include southern Butler County where the townships of Cranberry and Adams have become extensions of the North Hills, and the fast-growing South Hills, including the streetcar suburb of Mount Lebanon, the post-war suburb of Upper St. Clair in Allegheny County, and the more recently developed areas surrounding the Southpointe office complex such as Peters and Cecil townships in northern Washington County.

There are a greater number of districts (294) in the region, however, which have median household incomes below the Greater Pittsburgh median. The ten districts with the lowest median household incomes are Duquesne, Braddock, Homestead, Rankin, Wilmerding, Arnold, East Pittsburgh, McKeesport, Uniontown, and Karns City. Seven of these districts are also in Allegheny County clustered in the largely deindustrialized Mon Valley and Turtle Creek Valley areas. Other areas with significantly low household incomes are several rural municipalities in far northern Butler, Armstrong, and Indiana counties as well as most of eastern and northern Fayette County which all have less accessibility to the regions main employment centers. The former mill towns of the Beaver Valley as well as the cities of New Castle, Steubenville, and Weirton, and their environs also have noticeably low median household income compared to the rest of the region.

== Airports ==
Pittsburgh International Airport is the primary airport providing commercial passenger service to the Pittsburgh metropolitan area. Arnold Palmer Regional Airport also provides limited commercial passenger service and is 44 miles (71 km) east of Pittsburgh.

Other airports with scheduled commercial service that are convenient to certain parts of the Pittsburgh metropolitan area include Morgantown Municipal Airport (79 miles (127 km) south of Pittsburgh), Youngstown–Warren Regional Airport (81 miles (130 km) northwest of Pittsburgh), Akron–Canton Airport (120 miles (190 km) northwest of Pittsburgh), and Erie International Airport (123 miles (198 km) north of Pittsburgh).

== See also ==
- Great Lakes Megalopolis
- Pittsburgh Media Market
- Western Pennsylvania
