= Sewickley =

Sewickley can refer to a location in the United States:

- Sewickley, Pennsylvania, a borough
  - Sewickley Academy, a private secondary school
  - Sewickley Bridge, a bridge over the Ohio River
- Sewickley Heights, Pennsylvania
- Sewickley Hills, Pennsylvania
- Sewickley Township, Pennsylvania
- New Sewickley Township, Pennsylvania
- North Sewickley Township, Pennsylvania
