= Quaker Valley School District =

School district in Pennsylvania

Address
- 100 Leetsdale Industrial Drive - Suite B, Leetsdale, PA 15056 Leetsdale, PA

District information
- Type: Public School District
- Motto: Educating and empowering all learners to design their best future.
- Grades: K-12
- Established: 1956

Students and staff
- Colors: Black, White, and Gold

Other information
- Website: www.qvsd.org

The Quaker Valley School District is an Allegheny County, Pennsylvania school district covering the Boroughs of Sewickley, Leetsdale, Edgeworth, Glen Osborne, Sewickley Hills, Sewickley Heights, Bell Acres, Haysville and Glenfield, as well as the townships of Leet and Aleppo. The district operates Quaker Valley High School (9th-12th), Quaker Valley Middle School (6th-8th), Edgeworth Elementary School (K-5th), and Osborne Elementary School (K-5th). The district is also responsible for the maintenance of the building that houses Sewickley Public Library.

The district was formed in 1956 by the voluntary merger of the various schools serving the eleven municipalities constituting the present district, as well as the two high schools then serving the present area, Leetsdale High School (which houses the present high school) and Sewickley High School (which houses the present middle school). In 2001, the district was one of three school districts in Pennsylvania to which the Pennsylvania Department of Education awarded a two-year, $4 million technology grant to become a "digital school district", one of the first in the commonwealth. As part of the initiative, the district provided laptop computers and home internet connectivity to each of its students in the third through twelfth grades. The implementation and early effects of the program were studied by RAND Corporation and Carnegie Mellon University. The modern effects of these programs can be seen by the school district’s commitment to providing all students in grades 3-12 with i-pad computers.
