= Mid-Atlantic (United States) =

Region of the United States

- Region
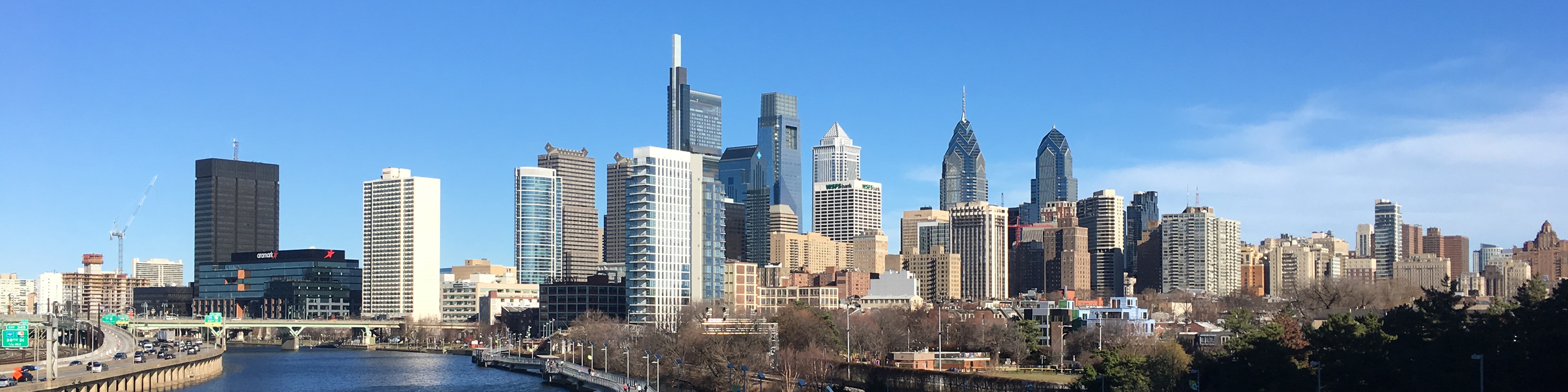
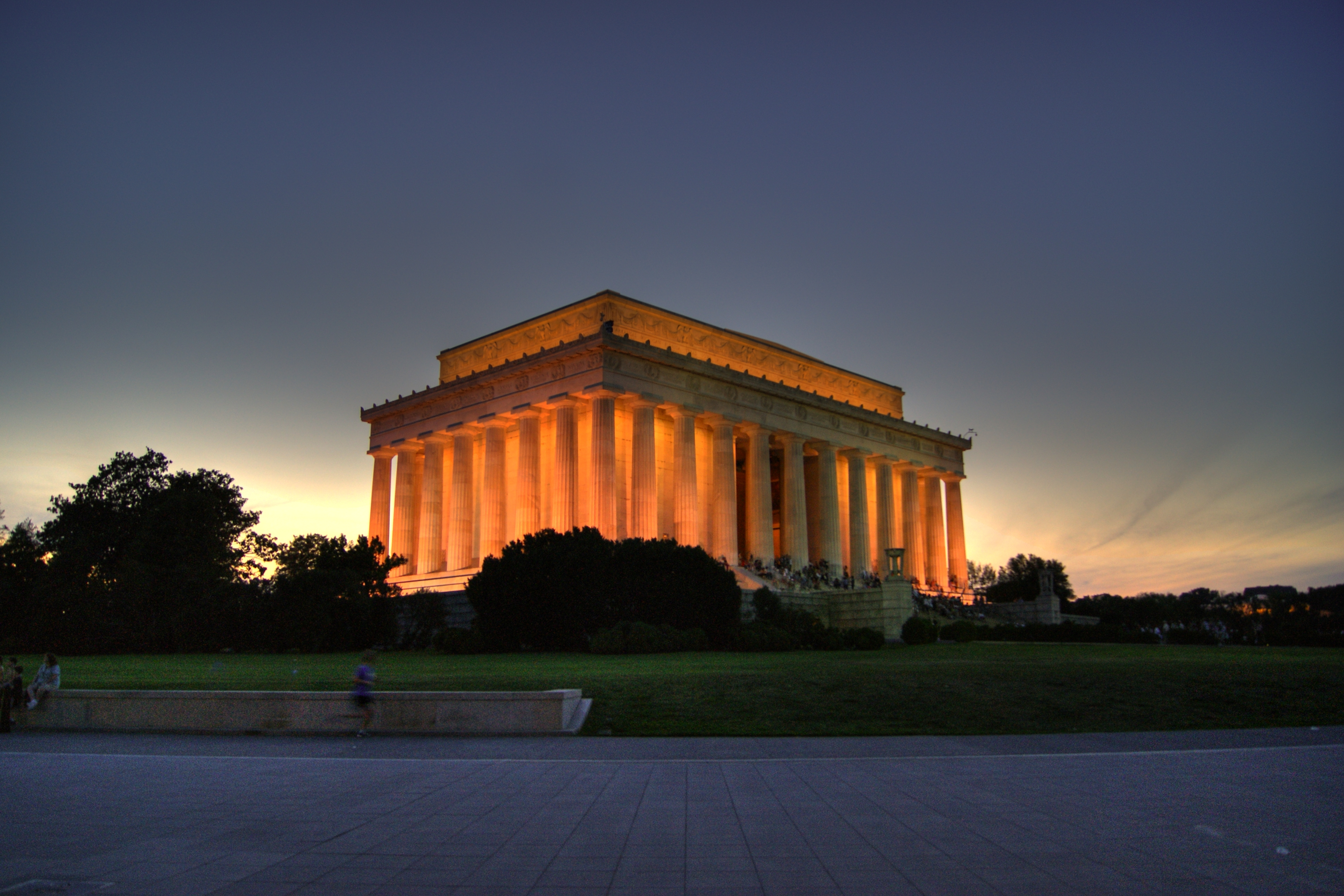
- Lower Manhattan (right) and the Brooklyn Bridge (left) John Brown's Fort Assateague Island Philadelphia Thomas Edison National Historical Park Cape Henlopen Lincoln Memorial

- Coordinates: 41°N 77°W
- Composition: New York; New Jersey; Maryland; Pennsylvania; Delaware; Virginia; West Virginia; Washington, D.C.
- Metropolitan areas: Buffalo–Niagara Falls; Albany–Schenectady–Troy; Philadelphia–Camden–Wilmington; New York–Newark–Jersey City; Allentown–Bethlehem–Easton; Pittsburgh; Rochester; Richmond; Syracuse; Utica-Rome; Washington; Scranton–Wilkes-Barre; Harrisburg–York–Lebanon; Virginia Beach–Norfolk–Newport News; Baltimore–Columbia–Towson
- Largest city: New York City

Area
  - Total: 191,299.86 sq mi (495,464.4 km^{2})
  - Land: 174,468.45 sq mi (451,871.2 km^{2})
  - Water: 16,831.41 sq mi (43,593.2 km^{2}) 8.80%

Population (2020)
  - Total: 60,783,913
  - Density: 348.39487/sq mi (134.51601/km^{2})

GDP (nominal)
  - Q3 2022: $5.233 trillion

The Mid-Atlantic is a region of the United States located in the eastern part of the country. Traditional definitions include seven US states: New York, New Jersey, Pennsylvania, Delaware, Maryland, Virginia, and West Virginia, as well as the national capital of Washington, D.C. Depending on various criteria used for inclusion in the Mid-Atlantic, however, other different regional divisions exist.

The Mid-Atlantic region played an instrumental and historic role in the nation's founding and development.

As of the 2020 census, the region had a population of 60,783,913, representing close to 20 percent of the nation's population. The Mid-Atlantic is a relatively affluent region of the nation, with nearly half of the nation's 100 highest-income counties based on median household income and one-third of the nation's top 100 counties based on per capita income. Most of the Mid-Atlantic states rank among the nation's 15 highest-income states.

The Northeast Corridor and Interstate 95 connect the region's major cities and suburbs, forming the Northeast megalopolis.

== Geographic composition ==
Definitions of the geographic components of the Mid-Atlantic region differ slightly among sources. Generally speaking, the region is inclusive of the states of Delaware, Maryland, New Jersey, New York, Pennsylvania, Virginia, and West Virginia, and the federal district of the District of Columbia.

Some additional sources include or exclude other areas in parts of the Northeast region and the South Atlantic states for various reasons.:

- The United States Census Bureau defines the Mid-Atlantic as a sub-region of the Northeast and includes only New Jersey, New York, and Pennsylvania.
- The Bureau of Labor Statistics excludes New York.
- The Environmental Protection Agency excludes New York and New Jersey.
- The U.S. Department of Transportation - United States Maritime Administration includes North Carolina.
- The United States Geological Survey, within the context of Ground-Water Vulnerability to Nitrate Contamination, defined the region as including Delaware, Maryland, Pennsylvania, Virginia, and Washington, DC, along with parts of New Jersey, New York, and North Carolina.

Virginia and particularly West Virginia are atypical of this region in a few ways. These states both lie primarily within the Southern American dialect region, and the major religious tradition is largely Evangelical Christian, with 30 percent of the population in Virginia and 39 percent in West Virginia identifying as evangelical. As for West Virginia, although a few of its eastern panhandle counties may be considered part of the Washington, DC metropolitan area, the state is largely rural and there are no major or even large cities.

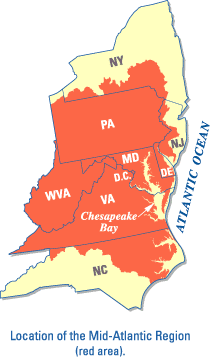
A USGS fact sheet on the Mid-Atlantic region's groundwater

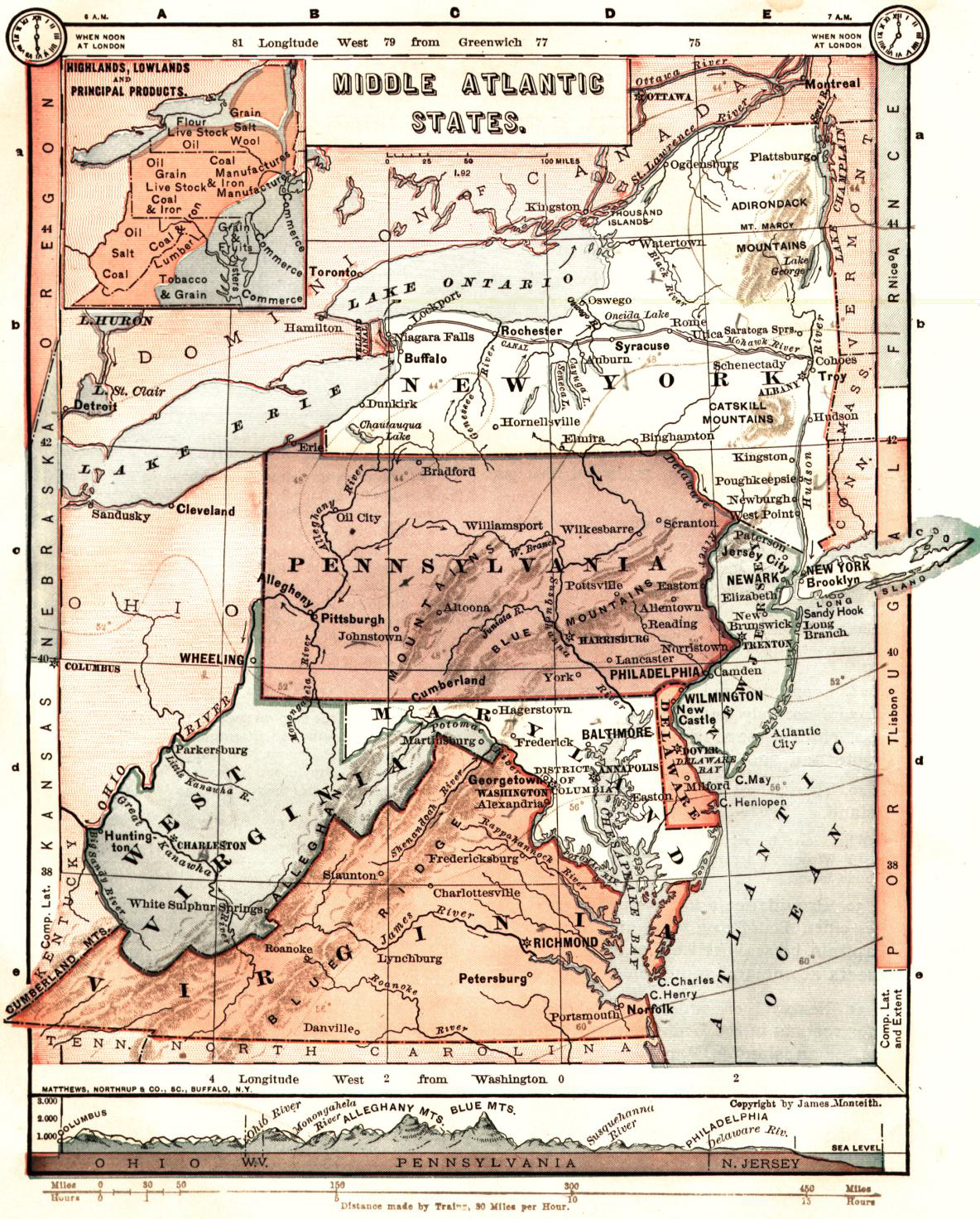
An 1897 map displaying a broad definition of the Mid-Atlantic region

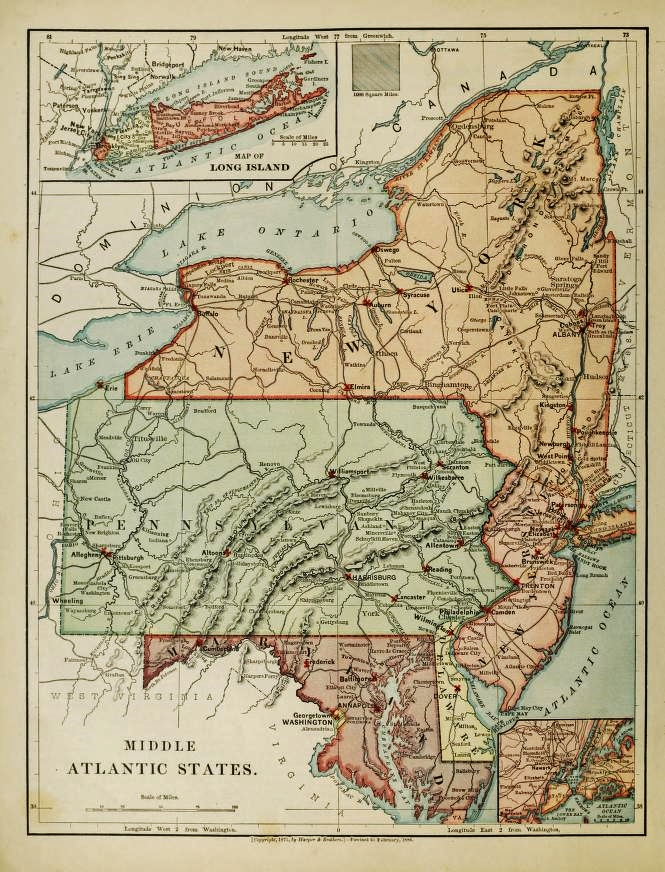
An 1886 Harper's School Geography map showing the region, which excludes Virginia and West Virginia

The US Census Bureau's geographic definition of the Mid-Atlantic includes three states, New Jersey, New York, and Pennsylvania

== History ==
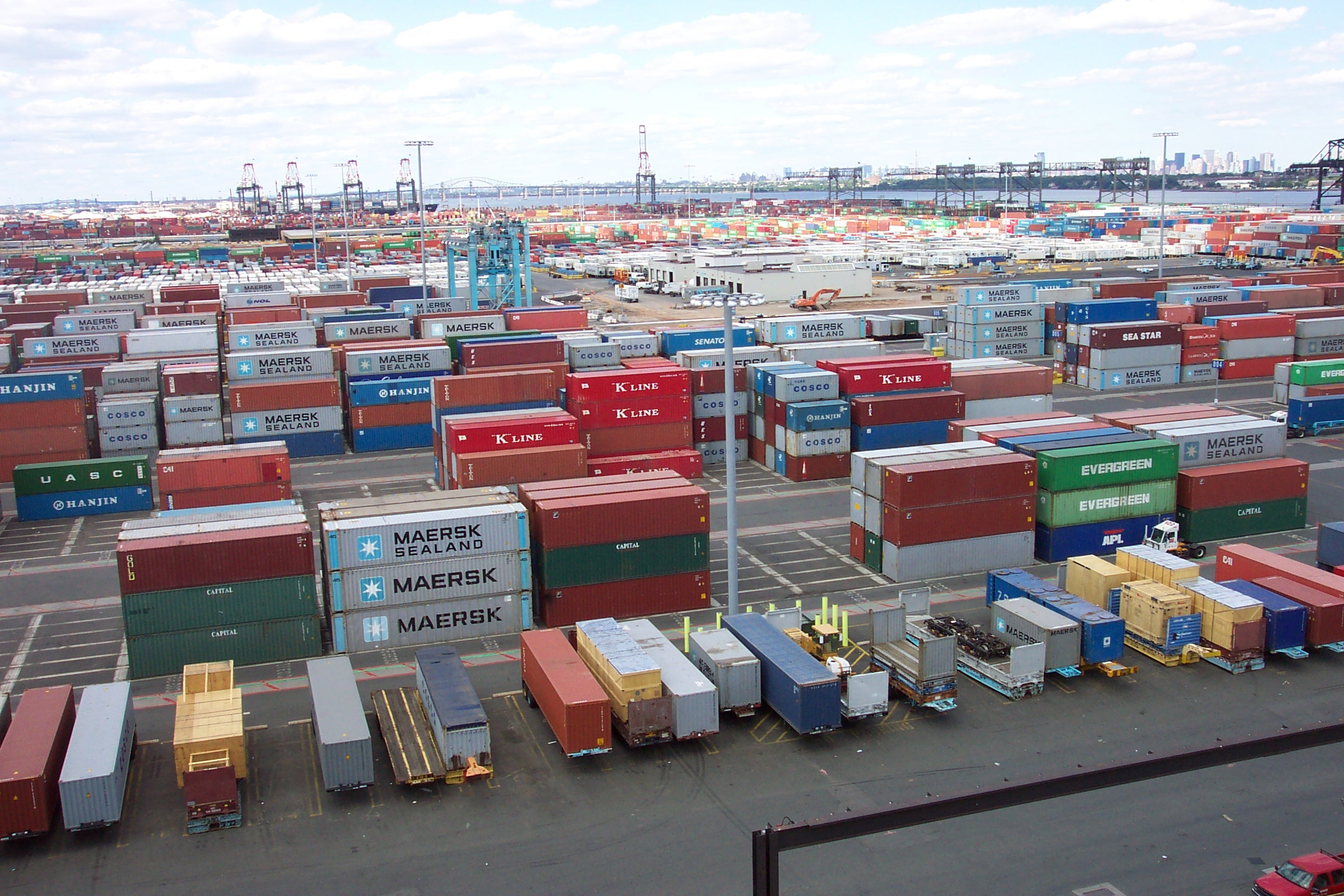
Shipping containers at Port Newark–Elizabeth Marine Terminal in the Port of New York and New Jersey

The first European to see the region was the explorer Giovanni da Verrazzano in 1524. Henry Hudson later extensively explored the region in 1611 and claimed it for the Dutch, who then created a fur-trading post in Albany, New York in 1614. The first permanent English colony in North America was Jamestown, Virginia, established in 1607.

The Mid-Atlantic region was settled during the colonial era between the early 17th century and the conclusion of the American Revolutionary War in 1783 by European Americans of primarily Dutch, German, Swedish, English, and other Western European ethnicities. From early colonial times, the Mid-Atlantic region was settled by a wider range of Europeans than New England or the South. The two great bulwarks of English settlement were divided from each other by the Dutch New Netherland settlement along the Hudson River in New York City and New Jersey, and—for a time—by the Swedish New Sweden settlement along the Delaware River in Delaware.

The region's original English settlements notably provided refuge to religious minorities: Maryland to Roman Catholics, and Pennsylvania to Quakers and Anabaptist Pennsylvania Dutch.

In the original Thirteen Colonies—which comprised six of the seven Mid-Atlantic states—religious pluralism and freedoms existed, particularly prevalent in the Province of Pennsylvania and in the geographic region that ultimately broke away from Pennsylvania to form the Delaware Colony. The Province of Maryland was the only one of the Thirteen Colonies with a substantial Catholic population.

In the 17th century, the region was known as the "Middle Colonies." It initially included four colonial provinces: the Delaware Colony and the provinces of New Jersey, New York, and Pennsylvania, each of which were among the Thirteen Colonies in pre-revolutionary British America. Afterward, the area was recognized geographically as the "Middle States," with Maryland, Virginia, and, in some instances, North Carolina as well as the Ohio Territory.

The area that came to be known as the Middle Colonies served as a strategic bridge between the North and South, as well as the location of the early governing documents of the young nation. More battles than in any other theater of the American Revolutionary War took place in the New York and New Jersey campaign. Philadelphia, midway between the northern and southern colonies, was home to the Continental Congress, the convention of delegates who organized the American Revolution. Philadelphia was also the birthplace of the Declaration of Independence in 1776 and the United States Constitution in 1787, and it was there that the United States Bill of Rights was drafted and ratified. The first Supreme Court of the United States sat for the first time, in the first capital under the Constitution of New York.

Shipping and trade have been important to the region's economy since the beginning of the colonial era.

Although the early settlers were mostly farmers, traders, and fishermen, the Mid-Atlantic states provided the young United States with heavy industry. They served as the "melting pot" of new immigrants from Europe. Cities grew along major ports, shipping routes, and waterways, including New York City and Newark on opposite sides of the Hudson River, Philadelphia on the Delaware River, Allentown on the Lehigh River, and Baltimore on the Chesapeake Bay.

Following the American Revolutionary War, the Mid-Atlantic region hosted each of the United States' historic capitals. The nation's capital was constructed in Washington, DC in the late 18th century and was relocated there from Philadelphia in 1800.

In the early part of the 19th century, New York and Pennsylvania overtook Virginia as the nation's two most populous states, and the Mid-Atlantic region overtook New England as the nation's most important trading and industrial center. During this period, large numbers of German, Irish, Italian, Jewish, Polish, and other immigrants arrived in the region's coastal cities, including Baltimore, Newark, New York City, Philadelphia, and interior cities such as Pittsburgh, and Rochester, Albany, and Buffalo (the latter also being included in the Great Lakes region) with their skyscrapers and subways, which would emerge in the 20th century as icons of modernity and American economic and cultural power.

In the late 19th century, the region played a vital and historic role in the development of American culture, commerce, trade, and industry sectors.

== Major states, cities, and urban areas ==
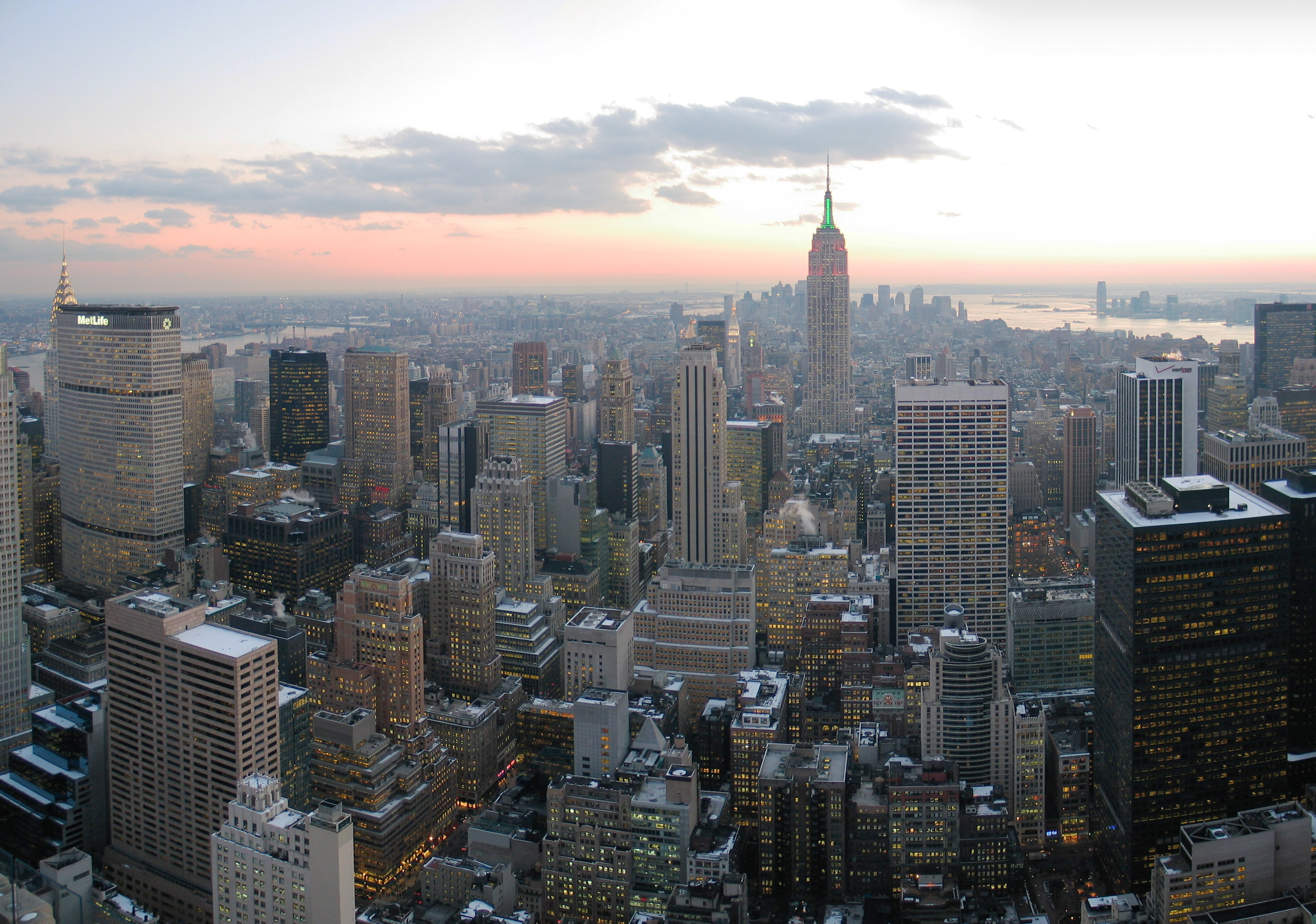
New York City

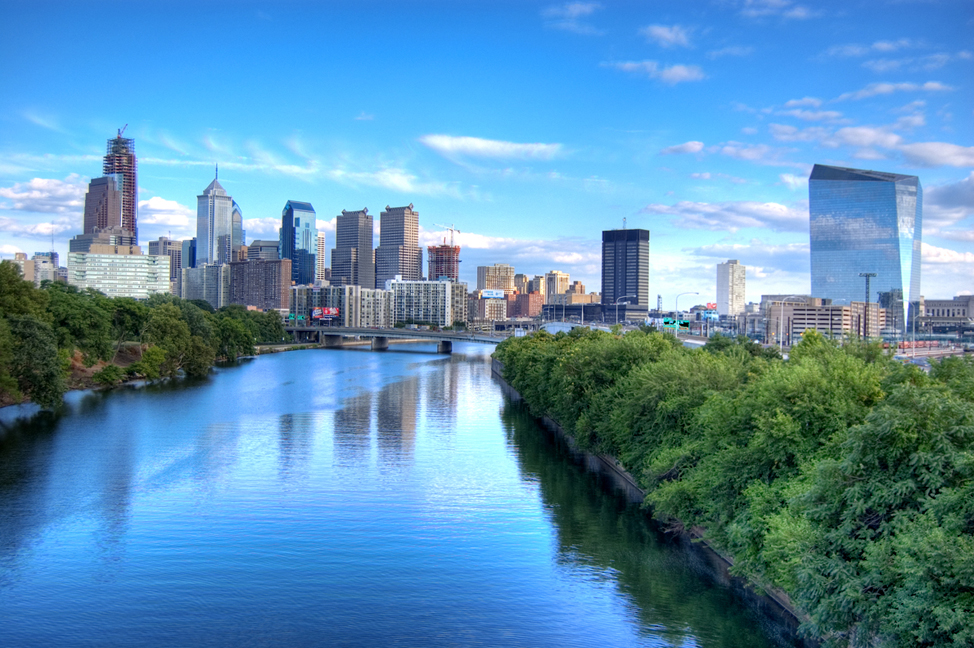
Philadelphia

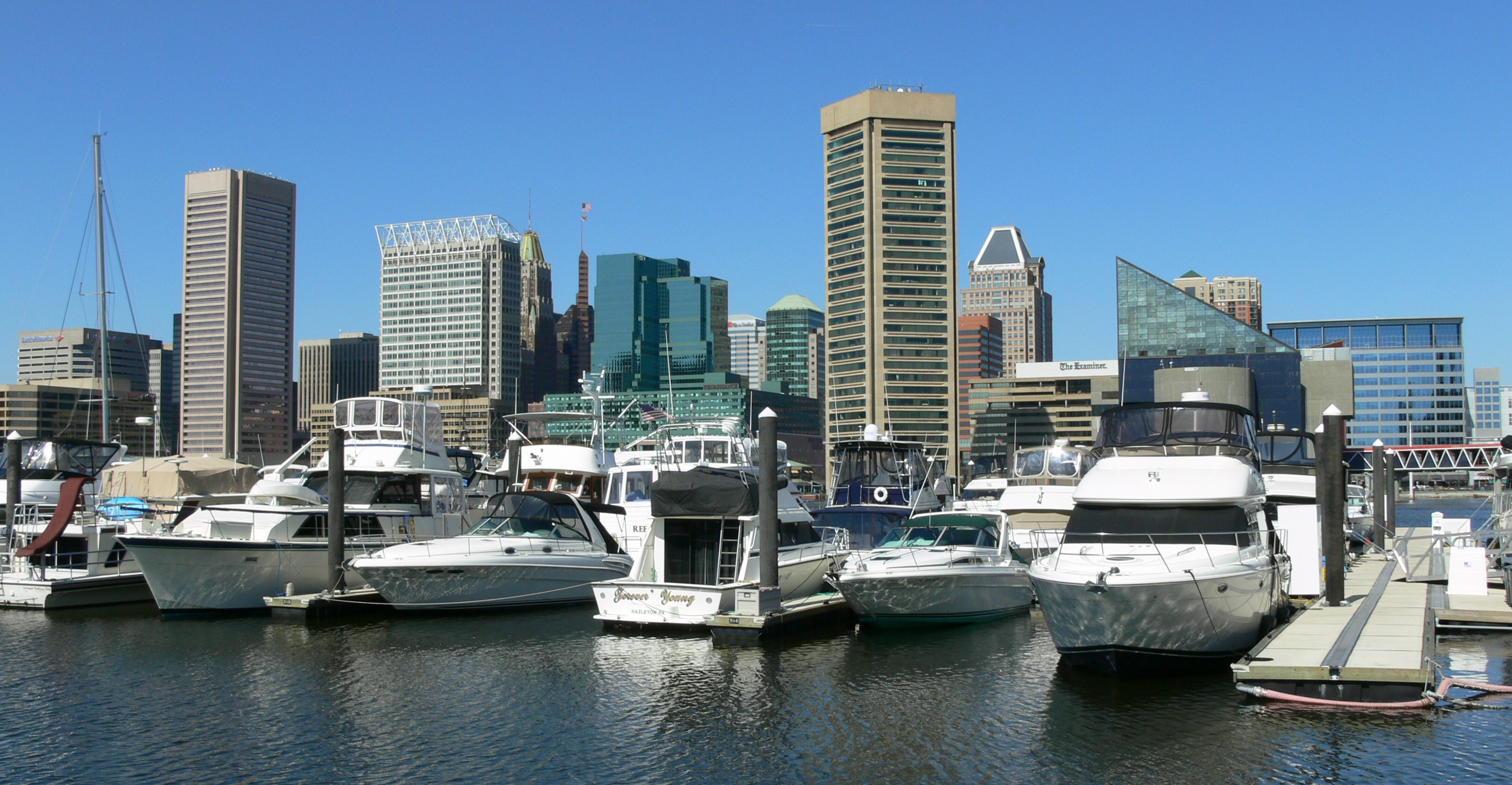
Baltimore

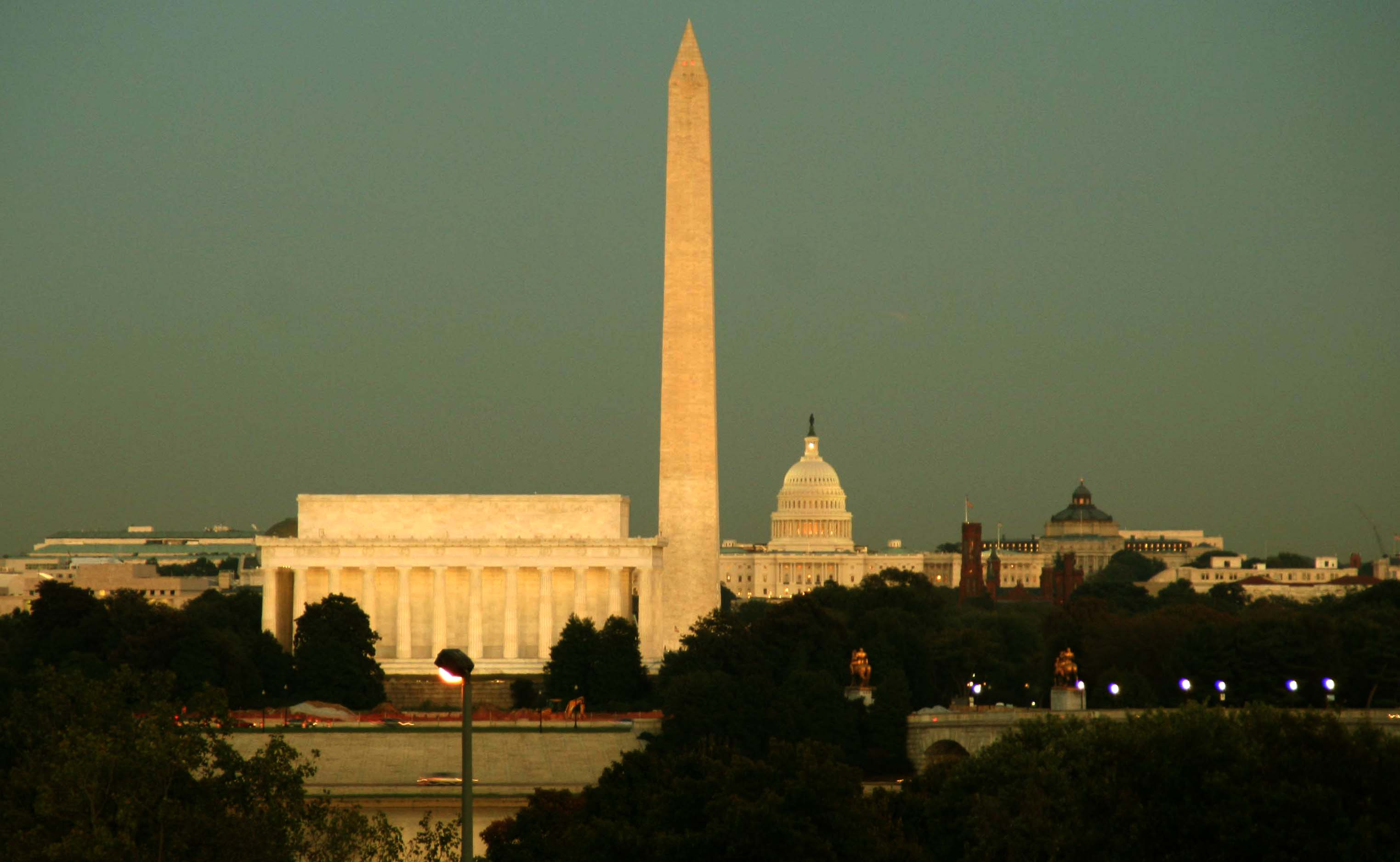
Washington, DC

=== Metropolitan areas ===
Largest metropolitan statistical areas by population in the Mid-Atlantic Region
	MSA	2020 census	2010 census
1	New York-Newark-Jersey City, NY-NJ	20,140,470	18,897,109
2	Washington-Arlington-Alexandria, DC-VA	6,385,162	5,649,540
3	Philadelphia-Camden-Wilmington, PA-NJ-DE	6,245,051	5,965,343
4	Baltimore-Columbia-Towson, MD	2,844,510	2,710,489
5	Pittsburgh, PA	2,370,930	2,356,285
6	Virginia Beach-Norfolk-Newport News, VA	1,799,674	1,713,954
7	Richmond, VA	1,314,434	1,186,501
8	Buffalo-Cheektowaga, NY	1,166,902	1,135,509
9	Rochester, NY	1,090,135	1,079,671
10	Albany-Schenectady-Troy, NY	899,262	870,716

Top ten largest cities by population in the Mid-Atlantic Region
	City	2020 census	Total area
1	New York, NY	8,804,190	472.43 sq mi
2	Philadelphia, PA	1,603,797	142.70 sq mi
3	Washington, DC	689,545	68.35 sq mi
4	Baltimore, MD	585,708	92.05 sq mi
5	Virginia Beach, VA	459,470	497.50 sq mi
6	Newark, NJ	311,549	25.88 sq mi
7	Pittsburgh, PA	302,971	58.35 sq mi
8	Jersey City, NJ	292,449	21.03 sq mi
9	Buffalo, NY	278,349	52.48 sq mi
10	Chesapeake, VA	249,422	350.95 sq mi

Top ten largest towns/townships by population in the Mid-Atlantic region
	Township	2020 census
1.	Hempstead, NY	793,409
2.	Brookhaven, NY	485,773
3.	Islip, NY	339,938
4.	Oyster Bay, NY	301,332
5.	North Hempstead, NY	237,639
6.	Babylon, NY	218,223
7	Huntington, NY	204,127
8	Ramapo, NY	148,919
9	Lakewood, NJ	135,158
10.	Amherst, NY	129,595

=== States and federal district ===
	State or federal district	2020 census	Total area
1	New York	20,201,249	54,555 sq mi
2	Pennsylvania	13,002,700	46,055 sq mi
3	New Jersey	9,288,994	8,722.58 sq mi
4	Virginia	8,631,393	42,774.2 sq mi
5	Maryland	6,177,224	12,407 sq mi
6	West Virginia	1,793,716	24,230 sq mi
7	Delaware	989,948	2,489 sq mi
8	Washington, DC	689,545	68.35 sq mi

Historical population
Census	Pop.	Note	%±
1790	2,085,066		—
1800	2,702,679		29.6%
1810	3,466,545		28.3%
1820	4,278,349		23.4%
1830	5,362,691		25.3%
1840	6,357,873		18.6%
1850	8,046,649		26.6%
1860	9,929,648		23.4%
1870	11,515,592		16.0%
1880	13,887,075		20.6%
1890	16,566,269		19.3%
1900	19,919,159		20.2%
1910	24,427,360		22.6%
1920	28,144,267		15.2%
1930	32,768,581		16.4%
1940	34,870,074		6.4%
1950	38,951,029		11.7%
1960	44,306,759		13.7%
1970	48,818,784		10.2%
1980	49,532,898		1.5%
1990	51,637,657		4.2%
2000	55,210,865		6.9%
2010	57,999,602		5.1%
2020	60,783,913		4.8%
Source:1790–2020

=== State capitals and federal district ===
	Capital	2020 census	Total area
1	Washington, DC	689,545	68.35 sq mi
2	Richmond, VA	226,610	62.57 sq mi
3	Albany, NY	99,224	21.94 sq mi
4	Trenton, NJ	90,871	8.20 sq mi
5	Harrisburg, PA	50,099	11.86 sq mi
6	Charleston, WV	48,864	32.64 sq mi
7	Annapolis, MD	40,812	8.11 sq mi
8	Dover, DE	39,403	23.97 sq mi

Note: The Mid-Atlantic region is also home to the nation's capital, Washington, DC.

== Presidential elections ==
Parties
Nonpartisan	Federalist	Democratic-Republican	National Republican	Democratic	Whig	Know Nothing	Republican	Constitutional Union	Progressive

- **Bold** denotes election winner.

Presidential electoral votes in the Mid-Atlantic states since 1789
Year	Delaware	Washington, DC	Maryland	New Jersey	New York	Pennsylvania	Virginia	West Virginia
1789	**Washington**	No election	**Washington**	**Washington**	Gridlocked	**Washington**	**Washington**	No election
1792	**Washington**	No election	**Washington**	**Washington**	**Washington**	**Washington**	**Washington**	No election
1796	**Adams**	No election	**Adams**	**Adams**	**Adams**	Jefferson	Jefferson	No election
1800	Adams	No election	**Jefferson**	Adams	**Jefferson**	**Jefferson**	**Jefferson**	No election
1804	Pinckney	No election	**Jefferson**	**Jefferson**	**Jefferson**	**Jefferson**	**Jefferson**	No election
1808	Pinckney	No election	**Madison**	**Madison**	**Madison**	**Madison**	**Madison**	No election
1812	Clinton	No election	**Madison**	Clinton	Clinton	**Madison**	**Madison**	No election
1816	King	No election	**Monroe**	**Monroe**	**Monroe**	**Monroe**	**Monroe**	No election
1820	**Monroe**	No election	**Monroe**	**Monroe**	**Monroe**	**Monroe**	**Monroe**	No election
1824	Crawford	No election	Jackson	Jackson	**Adams**	Jackson	Crawford	No election
1828	Adams	No election	Adams	Adams	**Jackson**	**Jackson**	**Jackson**	No election
1832	Clay	No election	Clay	**Jackson**	**Jackson**	**Jackson**	**Jackson**	No election
1836	Harrison	No election	Harrison	Harrison	**Van Buren**	**Van Buren**	**Van Buren**	No election
1840	**Harrison**	No election	**Harrison**	**Harrison**	**Harrison**	**Harrison**	Van Buren	No election
1844	Clay	No election	Clay	Clay	**Polk**	**Polk**	**Polk**	No election
1848	**Taylor**	No election	**Taylor**	**Taylor**	**Taylor**	**Taylor**	Cass	No election
1852	**Pierce**	No election	**Pierce**	**Pierce**	**Pierce**	**Pierce**	**Pierce**	No election
1856	**Buchanan**	No election	Fillmore	**Buchanan**	Frémont	**Buchanan**	**Buchanan**	No election
1860	Breckinridge	No election	Breckinridge	**Lincoln**	**Lincoln**	**Lincoln**	Bell	No election
1864	McClellan	No election	**Lincoln**	McClellan	**Lincoln**	**Lincoln**	No election	**Lincoln**
1868	Seymour	No election	Seymour	Seymour	Seymour	**Grant**	No election	**Grant**
1872	**Grant**	No election	Hendricks	**Grant**	**Grant**	**Grant**	**Grant**	**Grant**
1876	Tilden	No election	Tilden	Tilden	Tilden	**Hayes**	Tilden	Tilden
1880	Hancock	No election	Hancock	Hancock	**Garfield**	**Garfield**	Hancock	Hancock
1884	**Cleveland**	No election	**Cleveland**	**Cleveland**	**Cleveland**	Blaine	**Cleveland**	**Cleveland**
1888	Cleveland	No election	Cleveland	Cleveland	**Harrison**	**Harrison**	Cleveland	Cleveland
1892	**Cleveland**	No election	**Cleveland**	**Cleveland**	**Cleveland**	Harrison	**Cleveland**	**Cleveland**
1896	**McKinley**	No election	**McKinley**	**McKinley**	**McKinley**	**McKinley**	Bryan	**McKinley**
1900	**McKinley**	No election	**McKinley**	**McKinley**	**McKinley**	**McKinley**	Bryan	**McKinley**
1904	**Roosevelt**	No election	Parker	**Roosevelt**	**Roosevelt**	**Roosevelt**	Parker	**Roosevelt**
1908	**Taft**	No election	Bryan	**Taft**	**Taft**	**Taft**	Bryan	**Taft**
1912	**Wilson**	No election	**Wilson**	**Wilson**	**Wilson**	Roosevelt	**Wilson**	**Wilson**
1916	Hughes	No election	**Wilson**	Hughes	Hughes	Hughes	**Wilson**	Hughes
1920	**Harding**	No election	**Harding**	**Harding**	**Harding**	**Harding**	Cox	**Harding**
1924	**Coolidge**	No election	**Coolidge**	**Coolidge**	**Coolidge**	**Coolidge**	Davis	**Coolidge**
1928	**Hoover**	No election	**Hoover**	**Hoover**	**Hoover**	**Hoover**	**Hoover**	**Hoover**
1932	Hoover	No election	**Roosevelt**	**Roosevelt**	**Roosevelt**	Hoover	**Roosevelt**	**Roosevelt**
1936	**Roosevelt**	No election	**Roosevelt**	**Roosevelt**	**Roosevelt**	**Roosevelt**	**Roosevelt**	**Roosevelt**
1940	**Roosevelt**	No election	**Roosevelt**	**Roosevelt**	**Roosevelt**	**Roosevelt**	**Roosevelt**	**Roosevelt**
1944	**Roosevelt**	No election	**Roosevelt**	**Roosevelt**	**Roosevelt**	**Roosevelt**	**Roosevelt**	**Roosevelt**
1948	Dewey	No election	Dewey	Dewey	Dewey	Dewey	**Truman**	**Truman**
1952	**Eisenhower**	No election	**Eisenhower**	**Eisenhower**	**Eisenhower**	**Eisenhower**	**Eisenhower**	Stevenson
1956	**Eisenhower**	No election	**Eisenhower**	**Eisenhower**	**Eisenhower**	**Eisenhower**	**Eisenhower**	**Eisenhower**
1960	**Kennedy**	No election	**Kennedy**	**Kennedy**	**Kennedy**	**Kennedy**	Nixon	**Kennedy**
1964	**Johnson**	**Johnson**	**Johnson**	**Johnson**	**Johnson**	**Johnson**	**Johnson**	**Johnson**
1968	**Nixon**	Humphrey	Humphrey	**Nixon**	Humphrey	Humphrey	**Nixon**	Humphrey
1972	**Nixon**	McGovern	**Nixon**	**Nixon**	**Nixon**	**Nixon**	**Nixon**	**Nixon**
1976	**Carter**	**Carter**	**Carter**	Ford	**Carter**	**Carter**	Ford	**Carter**
1980	**Reagan**	Carter	Carter	**Reagan**	**Reagan**	**Reagan**	**Reagan**	Carter
1984	**Reagan**	Mondale	**Reagan**	**Reagan**	**Reagan**	**Reagan**	**Reagan**	**Reagan**
1988	**Bush**	Dukakis	**Bush**	**Bush**	Dukakis	**Bush**	**Bush**	Dukakis
1992	**Clinton**	**Clinton**	**Clinton**	**Clinton**	**Clinton**	**Clinton**	Bush	**Clinton**
1996	**Clinton**	**Clinton**	**Clinton**	**Clinton**	**Clinton**	**Clinton**	Dole	**Clinton**
2000	Gore	Gore	Gore	Gore	Gore	Gore	**Bush**	**Bush**
2004	Kerry	Kerry	Kerry	Kerry	Kerry	Kerry	**Bush**	**Bush**
2008	**Obama**	**Obama**	**Obama**	**Obama**	**Obama**	**Obama**	**Obama**	McCain
2012	**Obama**	**Obama**	**Obama**	**Obama**	**Obama**	**Obama**	**Obama**	Romney
2016	Clinton	Clinton	Clinton	Clinton	Clinton	**Trump**	Clinton	**Trump**
2020	**Biden**	**Biden**	**Biden**	**Biden**	**Biden**	**Biden**	**Biden**	Trump
2024	Harris	Harris	Harris	Harris	Harris	**Trump**	Harris	**Trump**
Year	Delaware	Washington, DC	Maryland	New Jersey	New York	Pennsylvania	Virginia	West Virginia

== Culture ==
=== Cuisine ===
Indigenous and immigrant cultures from around the world deeply shape the cuisine of this region.

=== Cinema and television ===
New York City is a major center for both American cinema and American television.

=== Literature ===
New York City and Philadelphia are major centers for American literature. Notably, the Harlem Renaissance took place in Harlem, a neighborhood in New York City.

Notable authors from the region include James Baldwin, James Fenimore Cooper, Junot Díaz, Michael Chabon, Allen Ginsberg, Louise Glück, Washington Irving, Herman Melville, Ezra Pound, Philip Roth, Susan Sontag, John Updike, Edith Wharton, Colson Whitehead, Walt Whitman, and William Carlos Williams.

=== Music ===
Baltimore, New York City, and Philadelphia are major centers for American music.

=== Sports ===
The Mid-Atlantic is home to 33 professional sports franchises in the five major leagues and the two most prominent women's professional leagues.

	NFL	NHL	MLB	NBA	MLS	WNBA	NWSL
New York/New Jersey	Giants; Jets	Devils; Islanders; Rangers	Mets; Yankees	Knicks; Nets	NYC FC; Red Bulls	Liberty	Gotham FC
Washington, DC	Commanders	Capitals	Nationals	Wizards	United	Mystics	Spirit
Philadelphia	Eagles	Flyers	Phillies	76ers	Union		
Pittsburgh	Steelers	Penguins	Pirates				
Baltimore	Ravens		Orioles				
Buffalo	Bills	Sabres					

Notable golf tournaments in the Mid-Atlantic include the Atlantic City LPGA Classic,Barclays, and Quicken Loans National..

Two high-level professional tennis tournaments are held in the region. The US Open, held in New York, is one of the four Grand Slam tennis tournaments, whereas the Washington Open is part of the ATP Tour 500 series and WTA 250 series.

Notable motorsports tracks include Dover Motor Speedway, Pocono Raceway, and Watkins Glen International, which have hosted Formula One; International Motor Sports Association (IMSA); IndyCar; National Association for Stock Car Auto Racing, LLC (NASCAR); and World Sportscar Championship races. The Englishtown and Reading drag strips have also hosted National Hot Rod Association (NHRA) national events.

Pimlico Race Course in Baltimore and Belmont Park in New York host the Preakness Stakes and Belmont Stakes horse races, which are part of the Triple Crown of Thoroughbred Racing.

== Economy ==
With a nominal GDP of over $5.2 trillion, the Mid-Atlantic economy would be the third-largest in the world if calculated separately, behind only the United States and China, and nearly $1 trillion larger than Japan. The region is economically supported by many industries, including finance, banking, healthcare, chemicals, telecommunications, and entertainment.

According to the Global Financial Centres Index, the Mid-Atlantic region is home to the leading financial center in the world (New York) at #1 and Washington, DC at #15.

Notable companies (over $100 billion market cap) headquartered in the region include:

Company	Headquarters	Market cap ($ billions)	Global rank
Chase	New York City	$447.91	13
Johnson and Johnson	New Brunswick, NJ	$430.06	15
Mastercard	Harrison, NJ	$364.48	22
Pfizer	New York City	$272.39	29
PepsiCo	Harrison, NY	$232.01	40
Verizon Communications	New York, NY	$225.96	45
Comcast-NBC	Philadelphia, PA	$211.42	50
Merck	Kenilworth, NJ	$192.90	60
Danaher	Washington, DC	$190.74	61
Morgan Stanley	New York City	$169.08	73
American Express	New York City	$147.98	89
Bristol Myers Squibb	New York City	$147.23	91
Citigroup	New York City	$127.27	105
Goldman Sachs	New York City	$115.43	118
BlackRock	New York, NY	$114.67	120
International Business Machines	North Castle, NY	$111.45	124
Estée Lauder	New York City	$108.67	130
Lockheed Martin	Bethesda, MD	$105.24	137

== Education ==
The region is home to many of the top ranked universities in the nation: Carnegie Mellon University in Pittsburgh; Columbia University in New York City; Cornell University in Ithaca, NY; Georgetown University in Washington, DC; Johns Hopkins University in Baltimore, MD; Princeton University in Princeton, NJ,Yale university in Connecticut, University of Pennsylvania in Philadelphia; and the University of Virginia in Charlottesville, VA, according to U.S. News & World Report Best Colleges Ranking.

== See also ==
- List of regions of the United States

== Bibliography ==
- Bodle, Wayne, "The Mid-Atlantic and the American Revolution", Pennsylvania History 82 (Summer 2015), 282–99.
- Heineman, Kenneth J., "The Only Things You Will Find in the Middle of the Road are Double Yellow Lines, Dead Frogs, and Electoral Leverage: Mid-Atlantic Political Culture and Influence across the Centuries", Pennsylvania History, 82 (Summer 2015), 300–13.
- Landsman, Ned C. Crossroads of Empire: The Middle Colonies in British North America (2010)
- Longhurst, James. "'Typically American': Trends in the History of Environmental Politics and Policy in the Mid-Atlantic Region". Pennsylvania History: A Journal of Mid-Atlantic Studies 79.4 (2012): 409–427.
- Magoc, Chris J., "In Search of a Useable—and Hopeful—Environmental Narrative in the Mid-Atlantic", Pennsylvania History, 82 (Summer 2015), 314–28.
- Mancall, Peter C., Joshua L. Rosenbloom, and Thomas Weiss. "Exports from the Colonies and States of the Middle Atlantic Region 1720–1800". Research in Economic History 29 (2013): 257–305.
- Marzec, Robert. The Mid-Atlantic Region: The Greenwood Encyclopedia of American Regional Cultures (2004)
- Richter, Daniel K, "Mid-Atlantic Colonies, R.I.P.", Pennsylvania History, 82 (Summer 2015), 257–81.
- Rosenbloom, Joshua L., and Thomas Weiss. "Economic growth in the Mid-Atlantic region: Conjectural estimates for 1720 to 1800". Explorations in Economic History 51 (2014): 41–59.
