= David Shields (disambiguation) =

David Shields (born 1956) is an American author.

David Shields may also refer to:

- David Shields (ice hockey) (born 1991), American former professional ice hockey player
- David Shields (baseball) (born 2006), American professional baseball pitcher
- David Shields (actor), British actor

== See also ==
- David Shields House, a historic house in Edgeworth, Pennsylvania, United States
