= Devlin Robinson =

American businessman and politician

Devlin J. Robinson

Member of the Pennsylvania Senate from the 37th district
- Incumbent
- Assumed office December 1, 2020
- Preceded by: Pam Iovino

Personal details
- Party: Republican
- Education: Central Catholic High School (Pittsburgh); Robert Morris University; University of Pittsburgh (M.B.A.)

Devlin J. Robinson is an American businessman and politician who is the Pennsylvania State Senator for the 37th district. A Republican, he was elected in the 2020 election, defeating Democratic incumbent Pam Iovino. Robinson assumed office on December 1, 2020. On June 13, 2024, while trying to deliver a package, a delivery driver collapsed in Senator Robinson's neighborhood. Senator Robinson and the owner of the package performed CPR, saving the driver's life.

For the 2025-2026 Session, Robinson sits on the following committees in the State Senate:

- Labor & Industry (Chair)
- Transportation (Vice Chair)
- Appropriations
- Banking & Insurance
- Community, Economic & Recreational Development
- Institutional Sustainability & Innovation
- Law & Justice
