= David Shields House =

Historic house in Pennsylvania, United States

- U.S. National Register of Historic Places
- Pittsburgh Landmark – PHLF
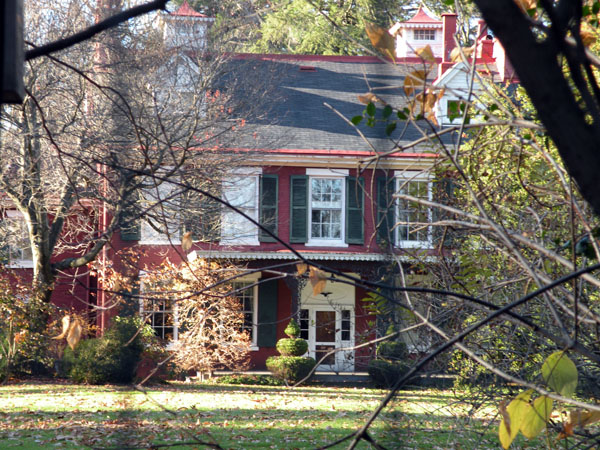

- Location within Pennsylvania Location within the United States
- Location: corner of Shields Lane and Beaver Road, Edgeworth, Pennsylvania, USA
- Coordinates: 40°33′25.34″N 80°11′59.14″W
- Built: 1823
- Architect: David Shields
- Architectural style: Federal
- NRHP reference No.: 75001607

Significant dates
- Added to NRHP: October 29, 1975
- Designated PHLF: 1976

The David Shields House (also known as Newington) at the corner of Shields Lane and Beaver Road in Edgeworth, Pennsylvania, was built in 1823. This Federal style house was added to the National Register of Historic Places on October 29, 1975, and the List of Pittsburgh History and Landmarks Foundation Historic Landmarks in 1976.
