= Haysville, Pennsylvania =

Borough in Pennsylvania, US

- Borough
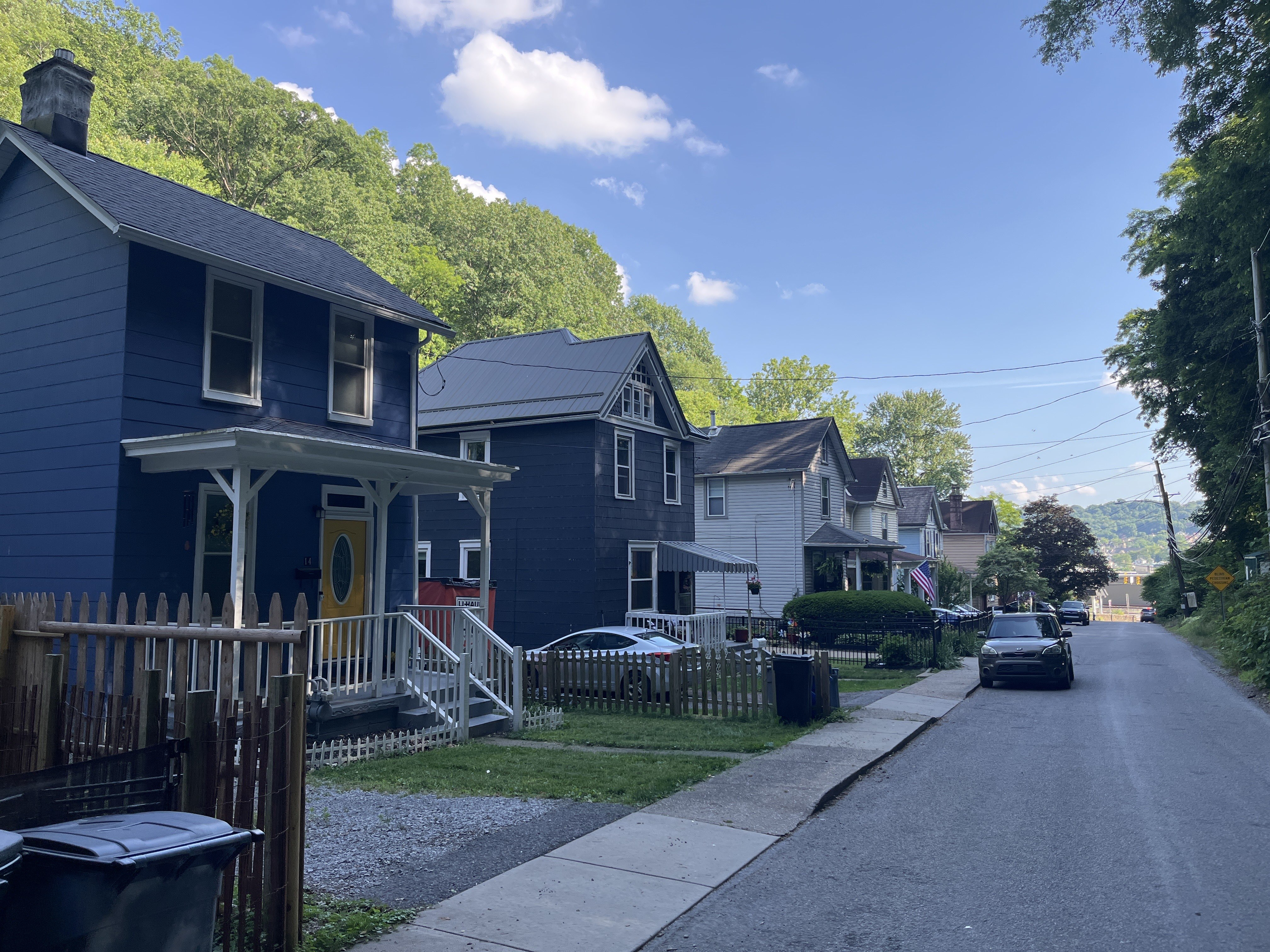
- Houses on River Road

- Location in Allegheny County and the U.S. state of Pennsylvania.
- Coordinates: 40°31′32″N 80°9′32″W
- Country: United States
- State: Pennsylvania
- County: Allegheny

Government
  - Mayor: Michael Kerr (R)
  - Council President: Catherine Paff (R)

Area
  - Total: 0.24 sq mi (0.61 km^{2})
  - Land: 0.17 sq mi (0.45 km^{2})
  - Water: 0.066 sq mi (0.17 km^{2})

Population (2020)
  - Total: 81
  - Density: 469/sq mi (181.1/km^{2})
- Time zone: UTC-5 (Eastern (EST))
  - Summer (DST): UTC-4 (EDT)
- FIPS code: 42-33312
- Website: haysvilleborough.org

Haysville is a borough in Allegheny County, Pennsylvania, United States, along the Ohio River. The population was 81 according to the 2020 census, making it the least-populous municipality (out of 130) in Allegheny County.

== Geography ==
Haysville is located at 40°31′32″N 80°9′32″W (40.525534, −80.158945).

According to the United States Census Bureau, the borough has a total area of 0.3 square miles (0.78 km^{2}), of which 0.2 square miles (0.52 km^{2}) is land and 0.1 square miles (0.26 km^{2}), or 23.08%, is water.

== Surrounding and adjacent neighborhoods ==
Haysville has three land borders with Aleppo Township to the north, Glenfield to the east and Glen Osborne to the west. Across the Ohio River to the south, Haysville runs adjacent with Coraopolis and Neville Township.

== Education ==
Haysville is within the Quaker Valley School District.

== Government and politics ==
Presidential election results
Year	Republican	Democratic	Third parties
2020	44% 25	51% 29	3% 2
2016	58% 23	38% 15	4% 2
2012	62% 24	38% 15	0% 0

== Demographics ==
Historical population
Census	Pop.	Note	%±
1910	166		—
1920	173		4.2%
1930	192		11.0%
1940	169		−12.0%
1950	177		4.7%
1960	143		−19.2%
1970	154		7.7%
1980	117		−24.0%
1990	100		−14.5%
2000	78		−22.0%
2010	70		−10.3%
2020	81		15.7%

As of the 2000 census, there were 78 people, 36 households, and 21 families residing in the borough. The population density was 389.0 inhabitants per square mile (150.2/km^{2}). There were 38 housing units at an average density of 189.5 per square mile (73.2/km^{2}). The racial makeup of the borough was 97.44% White, and 2.56% from two or more races.

There were 36 households, out of which 22.2% had children under the age of 18 living with them, 41.7% were married couples living together, 13.9% had a female householder with no husband present, and 38.9% were non-families. 27.8% of all households were made up of individuals, and 13.9% had someone living alone who was 65 years of age or older. The average household size was 2.17 and the average family size was 2.68.

In the borough the population was spread out, with 15.4% under the age of 18, 9.0% from 18 to 24, 30.8% from 25 to 44, 23.1% from 45 to 64, and 21.8% who were 65 years of age or older. The median age was 42 years. For every 100 females, there were 95.0 males. For every 100 females age 18 and over, there were 78.4 males.

The median income for a household in the borough was $33,750, and the median income for a family was $49,375. Males had a median income of $29,167 versus $21,250 for females. The per capita income for the borough was $53,151. There were 9.5% of families and 17.3% of the population living below the poverty line, including 23.1% of under eighteens and 12.5% of those over 64.

== See also ==
- List of cities and towns along the Ohio River
