= Bell Acres, Pennsylvania =

Borough in Pennsylvania, US

- Borough
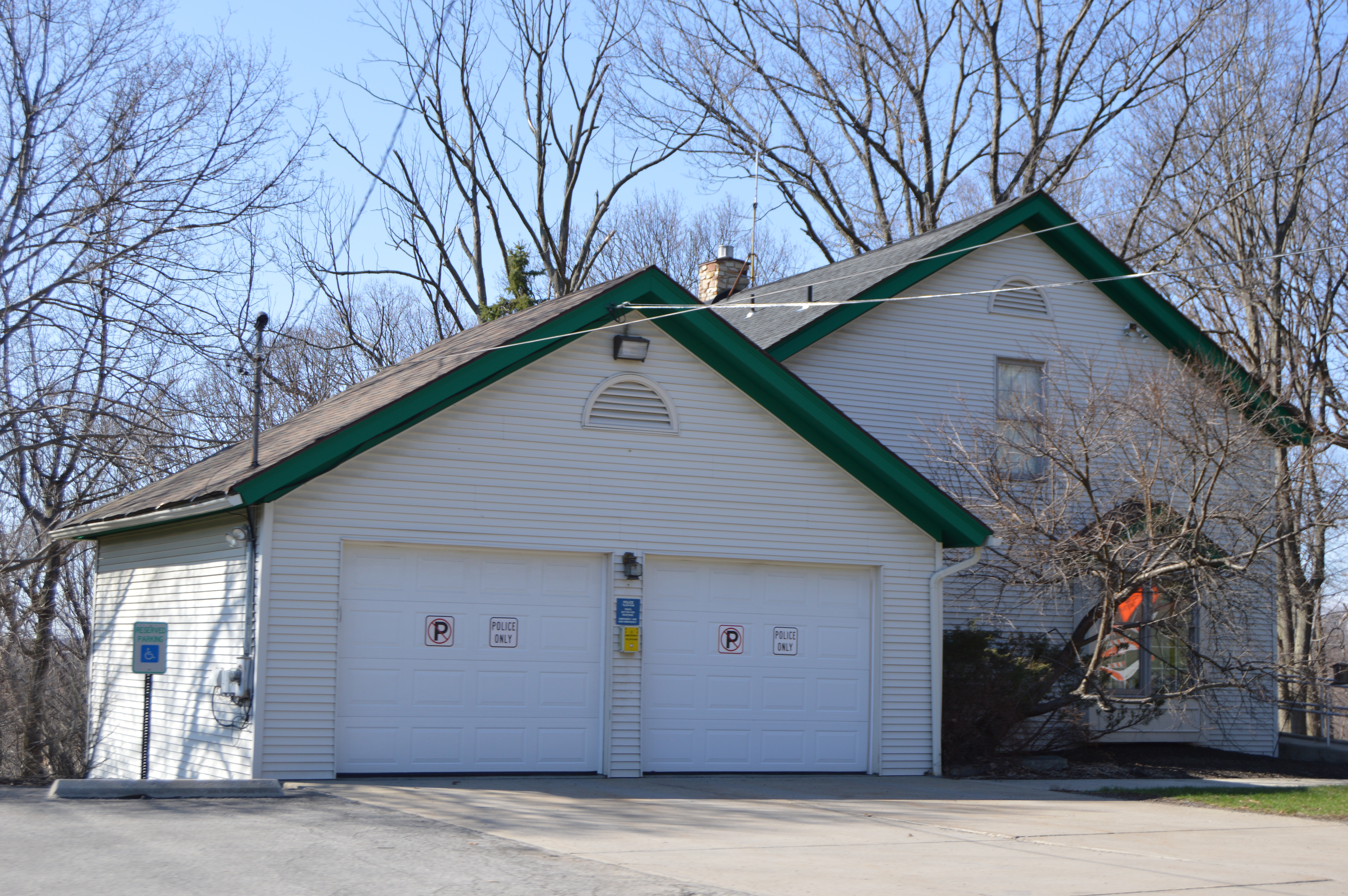
- Municipal building and police offices

- Location in Allegheny County and the U.S. state of Pennsylvania.

- Location of Pennsylvania in the United States
- Coordinates: 40°35′32″N 80°10′34″W
- Country: United States
- State: Pennsylvania
- County: Allegheny
- Settled: c. 1808
- Incorporated: March 14, 1960

Government
  - Mayor: Kenneth Alvania

Area
  - Total: 5.35 sq mi (13.86 km^{2})
  - Land: 5.35 sq mi (13.86 km^{2})
  - Water: 0 sq mi (0.00 km^{2})
- Elevation: 965 ft (294 m)

Population (2020)
  - Total: 1,505
  - Density: 281.2/sq mi (108.58/km^{2})
- Time zone: UTC-5 (EST)
  - Summer (DST): UTC-4 (EDT)
- ZIP code: 15143
- Area code: 412
- FIPS code: 42-05216
- School District: Quaker Valley
- Website: Bell Acres Borough

Bell Acres is a borough in Allegheny County, Pennsylvania, United States, and is part of the Pittsburgh metropolitan area. The population was 1,505 according to the 2020 census.

== History ==
Bell Acres was settled circa 1808. The area was originally established as Sewickley Township on June 28, 1854. Bell Acres was incorporated as its own borough on March 14, 1960. The community was named after Bell Farms.

== Geography ==
Bell Acres is located at 40°35′32″N 80°10′34″W.

According to the United States Census Bureau, the borough has a total area of 5.2 square miles (13 km^{2}), all land. Its average elevation is 965 feet (294 m) above sea level.

== Surrounding neighborhoods ==
Bell Acres has six borders, including Economy in Beaver County to the north and northwest, Franklin Park to the east, Sewickley Hills to the southeast, Sewickley Heights to the south, and Edgeworth and Leet Township to the southwest.

== Education ==
Bell Acres is served by the Quaker Valley School District.

== Government and politics ==
Presidential Elections Results
Year	Republican	Democratic	Third Parties
2024	49% 489	49% 483	2% 17
2020	50% 511	47% 482	1% 16
2016	52% 439	44% 373	4% 32
2012	61% 491	38% 306	1% 9

The Borough Council is a seven-member body of lawmakers.

Name	Title
David Renfrew	Council President
Brock Meanor	Council Vice President
Christopher Abell	Councilor
Lane Grafton	Councilor
Charles Kulbacki	Councilor
Michelle Veeck	Councilor
Megan Wine	Councilor

The Mayor of Bell Acres is Kenneth Alvania (D).

== Demographics ==
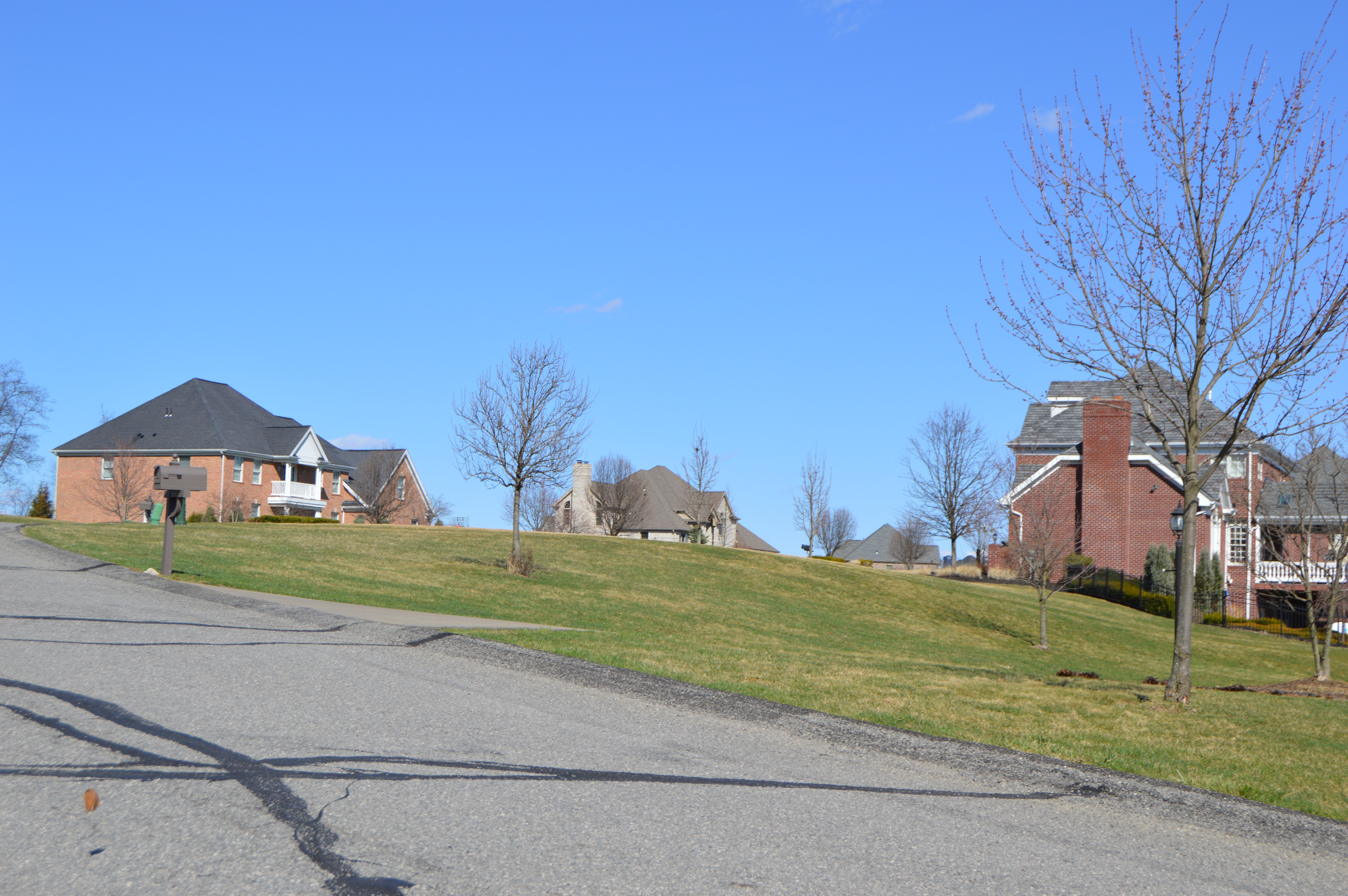
Single family homes off Camp Meeting Road

Historical population
Census	Pop.	Note	%±
1970	1,264		—
1980	1,307		3.4%
1990	1,436		9.9%
2000	1,382		−3.8%
2010	1,388		0.4%
2020	1,505		8.4%

As of the census of 2000, there were 1,382 people, 520 households, and 412 families residing in the borough. The population density was 265.3 people per square mile (102.4 people/km^{2}). There were 540 housing units at an average density of 103.6 per square mile (40.0/km^{2}). The racial makeup of the borough was 95.66% White, 1.09% African American, 0.65% Native American, 1.52% Asian, 0.29% from other races, and 0.80% from two or more races. Hispanic or Latino of any race were 0.22% of the population.

There were 520 households, out of which 32.1% had children under the age of 18 living with them, 70.8% were married couples living together, 6.0% had a female householder with no husband present, and 20.6% were non-families. 18.8% of all households were made up of individuals, and 10.2% had someone living alone who was 65 years of age or older. The average household size was 2.66 and the average family size was 3.04.

In the borough the population was spread out, with 24.1% under the age of 18, 4.8% from 18 to 24, 24.9% from 25 to 44, 28.1% from 45 to 64, and 18.0% who were 65 years of age or older. The median age was 43 years. For every 100 females there were 97.7 males. For every 100 females age 18 and over, there were 101.3 males.

The median income for a household in the borough was $61,094, and the median income for a family was $70,288. Males had a median income of $55,625 versus $29,375 for females. The per capita income for the borough was $41,202. About 1.9% of families and 3.1% of the population were below the poverty line, including 4.3% of those under age 18 and 2.8% of those age 65 or over.
