= Aleppo Township, Allegheny County, Pennsylvania =

Township in Pennsylvania, US

Aleppo Township
- Township
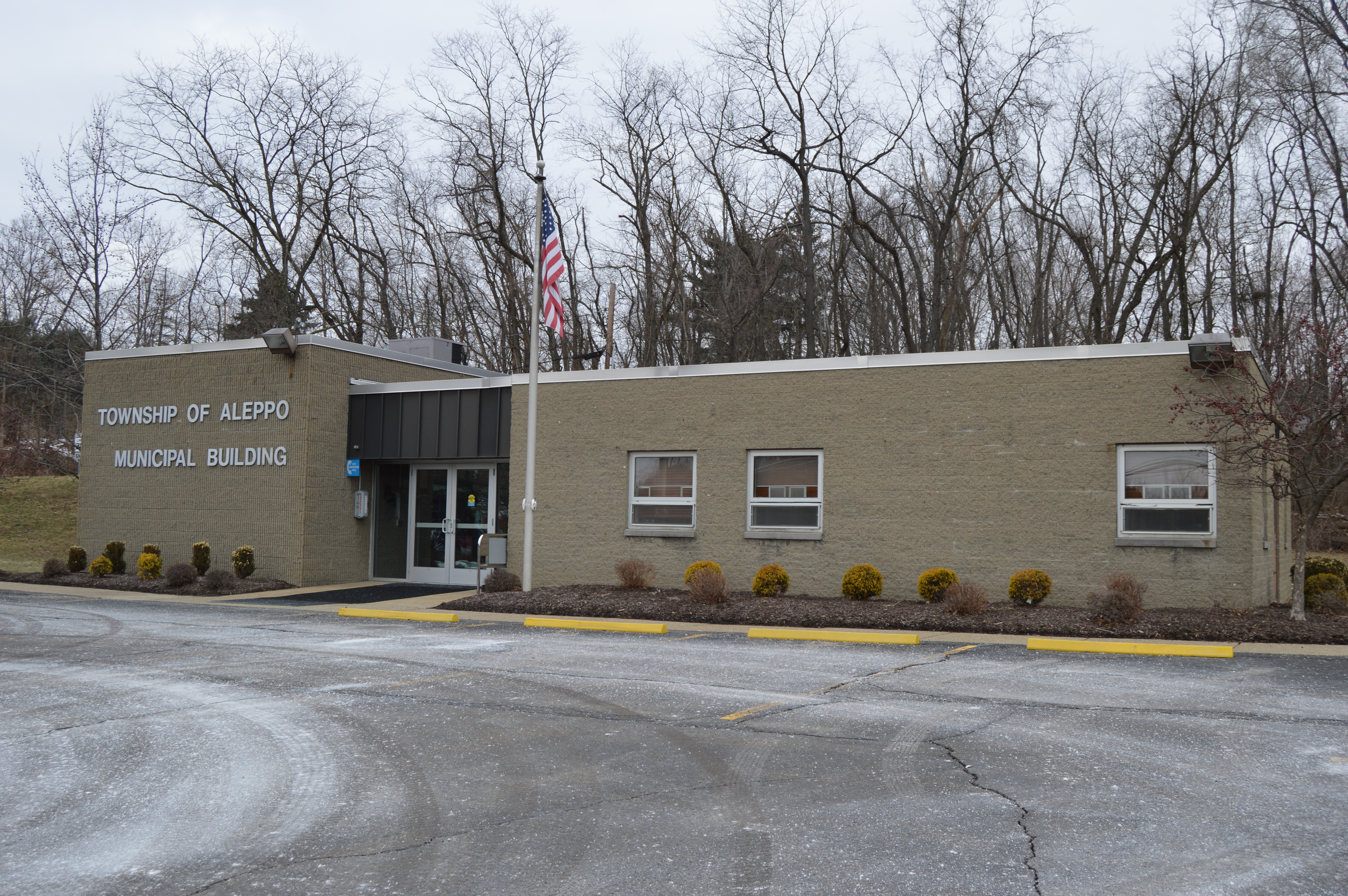
- Township hall

- Logo

- Location in Allegheny County and state of Pennsylvania
- Coordinates: 40°31′35″N 80°7′26″W
- Country: United States
- State: Pennsylvania
- County: Allegheny
- Incorporated: June 7, 1876

Government
  - President: Matthew Doebler (D)

Area
  - Total: 1.77 sq mi (4.59 km^{2})
  - Land: 1.77 sq mi (4.59 km^{2})
  - Water: 0 sq mi (0.00 km^{2})
- Elevation: 1,112 ft (339 m)

Population (2020)
  - Total: 1,828
  - Estimate (2022): 1,787
  - Density: 1,067.4/sq mi (412.11/km^{2})
- Time zone: UTC-5 (EST)
  - Summer (DST): UTC-4 (EDT)
- ZIP code: 15143
- Area code: 412
- School District: Quaker Valley
- Website: aleppotownship.com

Aleppo Township is a township in Allegheny County, Pennsylvania, United States. The population was 1,828 at the 2020 census, a decrease from the figure of 1,916 tabulated in 2010.

== Geography ==
According to the United States Census Bureau, the township has a total area of 1.8 square miles (4.7 km^{2}), all land. Its average elevation is 1,112 feet (339 m) above sea level.

== Surrounding neighborhoods ==
Aleppo Township has six borders, including the borough of Sewickley Heights to the north, Kilbuck Township to the east, and the boroughs of Glenfield to the south, Haysville to the south-southwest, Glen Osborne to the southwest, and Sewickley to the west and northwest.

== Government and politics ==
Presidential Elections Results
Year	Republican	Democratic	Third Parties
2020	48% 540	50% 559	0.8% 9
2016	54% 540	43% 431	3% 31
2012	60% 581	38% 371	2% 13

=== Councilmembers ===
- [2017-2019] Republicans-2 (Doebler, Williams), Democrats-0, Unknown-3 (Jones, Darragh, Duplaga)

== Education ==
Aleppo Township is served by the Quaker Valley School District.

== History ==
Aleppo Township was incorporated as a township on June 7, 1876, from the western section of Kilbuck Township. It was part of the Depreciation Lands reserved for Revolutionary War veterans. Sparse settlement occurred in the 1800s, and Aleppo Township lost land that formed the boroughs of Sewickley Heights, Glenfield, and Haysville.

Aleppo became a first class township on November 8, 1960.

== Demographics ==
Historical population
Census	Pop.	Note	%±
1880	657		—
1890	510		−22.4%
1900	616		20.8%
1910	458		−25.6%
1920	397		−13.3%
1930	419		5.5%
1940	504		20.3%
1950	560		11.1%
1960	755		34.8%
1970	794		5.2%
1980	1,134		42.8%
1990	1,246		9.9%
2000	1,039		−16.6%
2010	1,916		84.4%
2020	1,828		−4.6%
2024 (est.)	1,777		−2.8%

As of the 2020 census, there were 1,039 people, 483 households, and 298 families residing in the township. The population density was 573.5 inhabitants per square mile (221.4/km^{2}). There were 509 housing units at an average density of 281.0 per square mile (108.5/km^{2}). Roughly 62% (316 housing units) of the township's housing units are contained within a single homeowner's association: the Sewickley Heights Manor Homes Association.

The racial makeup of the township was 95.48% White, 3.08% African American, 1.06% Asian, 0.10% from other races, and 0.29% from two or more races. Hispanic or Latino of any race were 0.96% of the population.

There were 483 households, out of which 22.6% had children under the age of 18 living with them, 50.1% were married couples living together, 9.3% had a female householder with no husband present, and 38.3% were non-families. 34.4% of all households were made up of individuals, and 12.2% had someone living alone who was 65 years of age or older. The average household size was 2.15 and the average family size was 2.78.

In the township the population was spread out, with 19.1% under the age of 18, 3.9% from 18 to 24, 26.3% from 25 to 44, 30.0% from 45 to 64, and 20.7% who were 65 years of age or older. The median age was 46 years. For every 100 females there were 90.6 males. For every 100 females age 18 and over, there were 85.7 males.

The median income for a household in the township was $59,167, and the median income for a family was $66,667. Males had a median income of $45,192 versus $40,000 for females. The per capita income for the township was $37,187. About 3.8% of families and 5.0% of the population were below the poverty line, including 11.5% of those under age 18 and 2.0% of those age 65 or over.
