= Glenfield, Pennsylvania =

Borough in Pennsylvania, US

- Borough
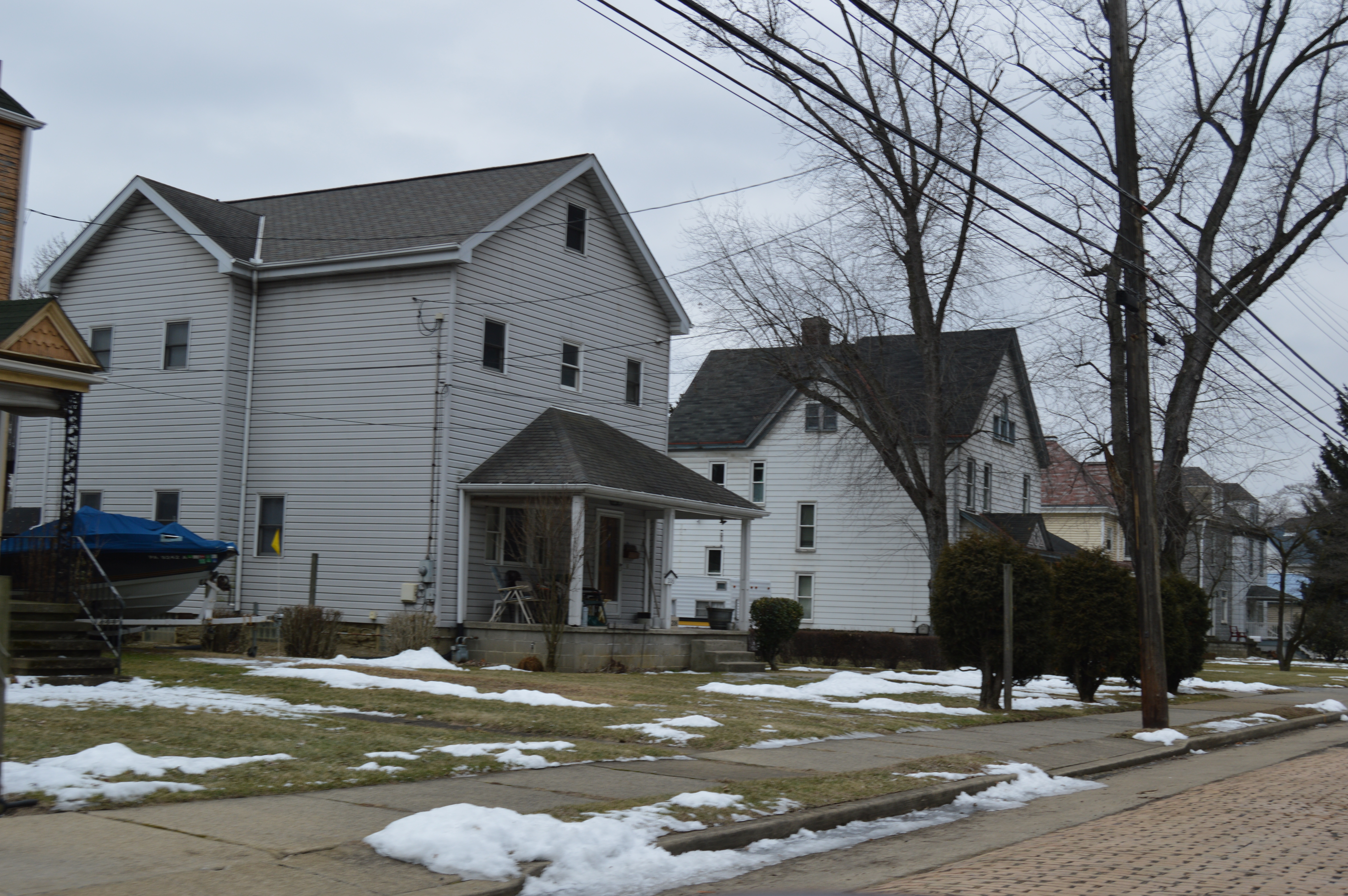
- Houses on East Beaver Street

- Location in Allegheny County and the state of Pennsylvania.
- Coordinates: 40°31′9″N 80°7′55″W
- Country: United States
- State: Pennsylvania
- County: Allegheny

Government
  - Type: Borough Council
  - Mayor: David Orbison (I)
  - President of Council: Paul Carmody (R)

Area
  - Total: 0.99 sq mi (2.56 km^{2})
  - Land: 0.82 sq mi (2.12 km^{2})
  - Water: 0.17 sq mi (0.44 km^{2})

Population (2020)
  - Total: 212
  - Density: 258.6/sq mi (99.84/km^{2})
- Time zone: UTC-5 (Eastern (EST))
  - Summer (DST): UTC-4 (EDT)
- FIPS code: 42-29592
- Website: www.glenfieldborough.org

Glenfield is a borough in Allegheny County, Pennsylvania, United States, situated along the Ohio River. The population was 212 at the time of the 2020 census.

== Geography ==
Glenfield is located at 40°31′9″N 80°7′55″W (40.519068, –80.131823).

According to the United States Census Bureau, the borough has a total area of 1.0 square mile (2.6 km^{2}), of which 0.9 square miles (2.3 km^{2}) is land and 0.2 square miles (0.52 km^{2}), or 16.00%, is water.

== Surrounding and adjacent neighborhoods ==
Glenfield has three land borders, including Aleppo Township to the north, Kilbuck Township to the east, and Haysville to the west. Across the Ohio River's main channel, Glenfield runs adjacent with the western end of Neville Island (Neville Township).

== Education ==
Glenfield is served by the Quaker Valley School District.

== Government and politics ==
Presidential election results
| Year | Republican | Democratic | Third parties |
|---|---|---|---|
| 2020 | 56% 69 | 40% 50 | 1% 2 |
| 2016 | 58% 62 | 38% 41 | 4% 4 |
| 2012 | 61% 60 | 38% 38 | 1% 1 |

== Demographics ==
Historical population
| Census | Pop. | Note | %± |
|---|---|---|---|
| 1880 | 538 | | — |
| 1890 | 718 | | 33.5% |
| 1900 | 905 | | 26.0% |
| 1910 | 984 | | 8.7% |
| 1920 | 976 | | −0.8% |
| 1930 | 950 | | −2.7% |
| 1940 | 911 | | −4.1% |
| 1950 | 870 | | −4.5% |
| 1960 | 741 | | −14.8% |
| 1970 | 406 | | −45.2% |
| 1980 | 246 | | −39.4% |
| 1990 | 241 | | −2.0% |
| 2000 | 236 | | −2.1% |
| 2010 | 205 | | −13.1% |
| 2020 | 212 | | 3.4% |

As of the 2000 census, there were two hundred and thirty-six people, ninety households, and sixty families in the borough.

The population density was 278.7 people per square mile (107.6 people/km^{2}). There were ninety-six housing units at an average density of 113.4 per square mile (43.8/km^{2}).

The racial makeup of the borough was 96.19% White, 2.54% African American, 0.85% Native American, and 0.42% from two or more races. Hispanic or Latino of any race were 0.42% of the population.

There were ninety households, out of which 33.3% had children under the age of eighteen living with them; 52.2% were married couples living together, 12.2% had a female householder with no husband present, and 33.3% were non-families. 30.0% of all households were made up of individuals, and 14.4% had someone living alone who was sixty-five years of age or older.

The average household size was 2.62 and the average family size was 3.30.

In the borough the population was spread out, with 30.5% under the age of eighteen, 4.7% from eighteen to twenty-four, 26.3% from twenty-five to forty-four, 21.6% from forty-five to sixty-four, and 16.9% who were sixty-five years of age or older. The median age was thirty-eight years.

For every one hundred females, there were 91.9 males. For every one hundred females who were aged eighteen or older, there were 92.9 males.

The median income for a household in the borough was $38,750, and the median income for a family was $43,250. Males had a median income of $37,500 compared with that of $23,333 for females.

The per capita income for the borough was $16,123.

Roughly 4.8% of families and 4.8% of the population were living below the poverty line, including 4.3% of those who were under the age of eighteen; none of those who were aged sixty-five or older were living in poverty.

== See also ==
- List of cities and towns along the Ohio River
