= Sewickley Hills, Pennsylvania =

Borough in Pennsylvania, US

- Borough
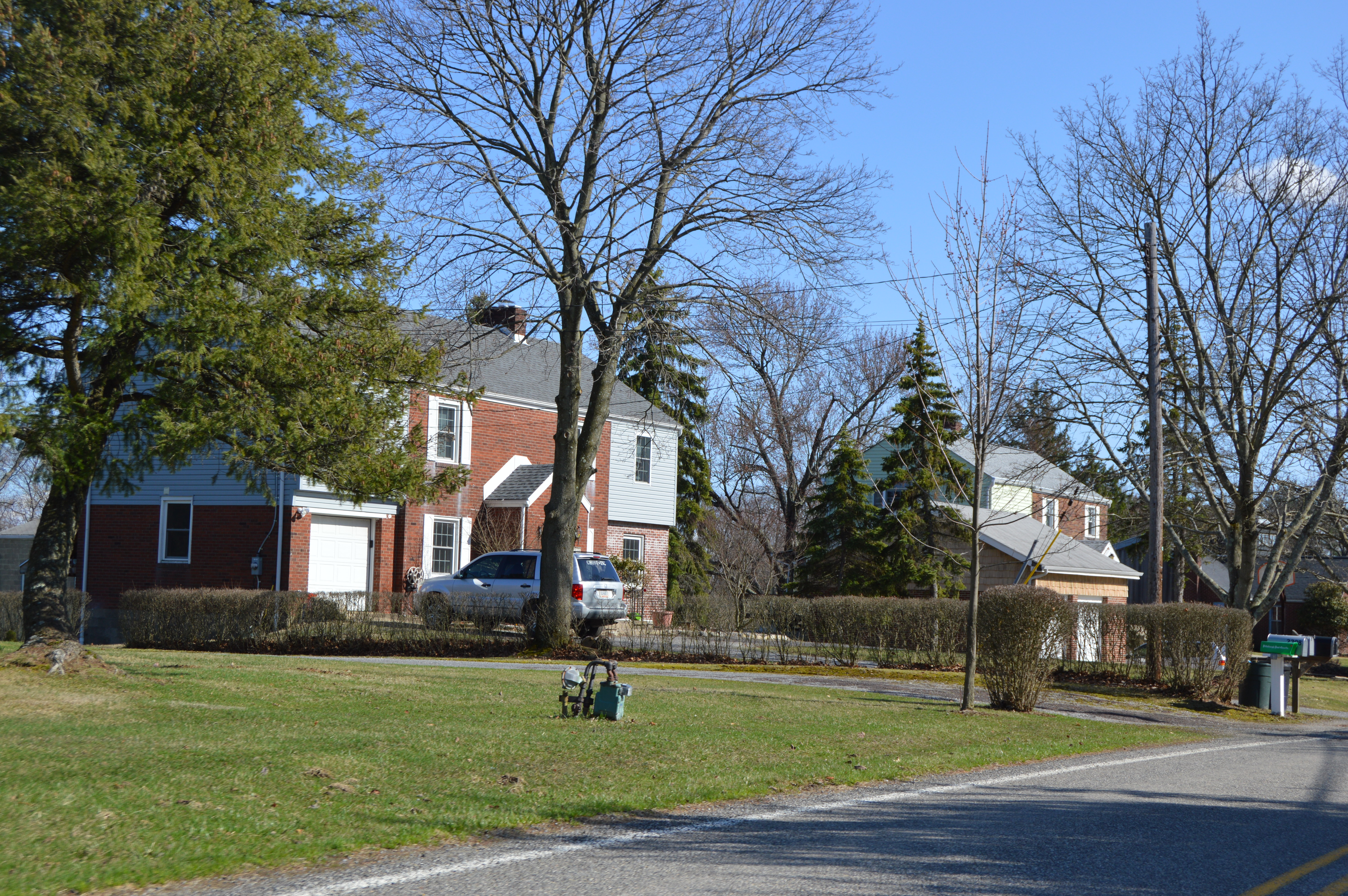
- Houses on Henry Road

- Location in Allegheny County and the U.S. state of Pennsylvania.
- Coordinates: 40°33′38″N 80°7′12″W
- Country: United States
- State: Pennsylvania
- County: Allegheny

Government
  - Mayor: David Malarik Sr. (R)

Area
  - Total: 2.47 sq mi (6.39 km^{2})
  - Land: 2.47 sq mi (6.39 km^{2})
  - Water: 0 sq mi (0.00 km^{2})

Population (2020)
  - Total: 689
  - Density: 279.5/sq mi (107.92/km^{2})
- Time zone: UTC-5 (Eastern (EST))
  - Summer (DST): UTC-4 (EDT)
- ZIP code: 15143
- Area code: 412
- FIPS code: 42-69416
- Website: www.sewickleyhills.com

Sewickley Hills is a borough in Allegheny County, Pennsylvania, United States. The population was 689 at the 2020 census. It is a residential suburb of the Pittsburgh metropolitan area.

== Geography ==
Sewickley Hills is located at 40°33′38″N 80°7′12″W (40.560548, −80.119960).

According to the United States Census Bureau, the borough has a total area of 2.5 square miles (6.5 km^{2}), all land.

=== Surrounding neighborhoods ===
Sewickley Hills has five borders, including Bell Acres to the north, Franklin Park to the northeast, Ohio Township to the east, Aleppo Township to the south, and Sewickley Heights to the west.

== Demographics ==
Historical population
Census	Pop.	Note	%±
1960	326		—
1970	270		−17.2%
1980	419		55.2%
1990	622		48.4%
2000	652		4.8%
2010	639		−2.0%
2020	689		7.8%

At the 2000 census, there were 652 people, 225 households, and 186 families living in the borough. The population density was 261.8 inhabitants per square mile (101.1/km^{2}). There were 231 housing units at an average density of 92.8 per square mile (35.8/km^{2}). The racial makeup of the borough was 94.33% White, 2.45% African American, 1.84% Asian, 0.77% from other races, and 0.61% from two or more races. Hispanic or Latino of any race were 1.69%.

There were 225 households, 40.0% had children under the age of 18 living with them, 77.3% were married couples living together, 3.6% had a female householder with no husband present, and 16.9% were non-families. 13.8% of households were made up of individuals, and 6.2% were one person aged 65 or older. The average household size was 2.90 and the average family size was 3.23.

The age distribution was 28.8% under the age of 18, 4.3% from 18 to 24, 25.2% from 25 to 44, 32.8% from 45 to 64, and 8.9% 65 or older. The median age was 40 years. For every 100 females there were 103.1 males. For every 100 females age 18 and over, there were 98.3 males.

The median household income was $79,466 and the median family income was $92,102. Males had a median income of $58,125 versus $31,875 for females. The per capita income for the borough was $38,681. About 3.6% of families and 3.5% of the population were below the poverty line, including 2.2% of those under age 18 and 2.9% of those age 65 or over.

== Government and politics ==
Presidential election results
Year	Republican	Democratic	Third parties
2024	Lost	WON	Lost
2020	51% 242	47% 224	1% 6
2016	55% 224	44% 180	1% 1
2012	58% 233	40% 161	2% 5

== Education ==
Sewickley Hills is served by the Quaker Valley School District.
