= Edgeworth, Pennsylvania =

Borough in Pennsylvania, US

- Borough
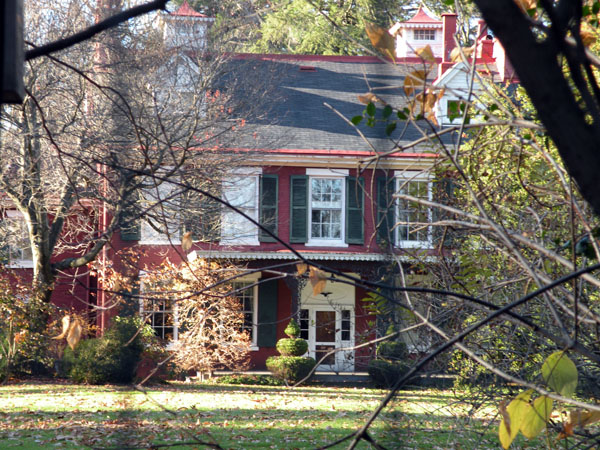
- Newington, a historic site in the borough

- Location in Allegheny County and the U.S. state of Pennsylvania.
- Coordinates: 40°33′3″N 80°11′33″W
- Country: United States
- State: Pennsylvania
- County: Allegheny
- Established: 1904

Government
  - Mayor: Gary L. Smith, MD
  - Borough Manager: John Schwend

Area
  - Total: 1.67 sq mi (4.33 km^{2})
  - Land: 1.50 sq mi (3.88 km^{2})
  - Water: 0.17 sq mi (0.45 km^{2})

Population (2020)
  - Total: 1,669
  - Density: 1,115.4/sq mi (430.66/km^{2})
- Time zone: UTC-5 (Eastern (EST))
  - Summer (DST): UTC-4 (EDT)
- FIPS code: 42-22576
- Website: Borough of Edgeworth

Edgeworth is a borough in Allegheny County, Pennsylvania, United States, along the Ohio River, approximately 14 miles (22.5 km) northwest of Pittsburgh. The population was 1,669 at the 2020 census. Edgeworth is the wealthiest town in Pennsylvania.

== History ==
Edgeworth was established in 1904 and took its name from the Edgeworth Seminary, a school for girls that had relocated there in 1836. The school was named in honor of Irish writer Maria Edgeworth. From early on, it became a bedroom community for managers and professionals escaping the industrial pollution of Pittsburgh.

== Geography ==
Edgeworth is located at 40°33′3″N 80°11′33″W (40.550767, -80.192590).

According to the United States Census Bureau, the borough has a total area of 1.7 square miles (4.4 km^{2}), of which 1.5 square miles (3.9 km^{2}) is land and 0.2 square miles (0.52 km^{2}), or 10.00%, is water.

== Surrounding and adjacent communities ==
Edgeworth has four land borders, including Leetsdale and Leet Township to the northwest, Bell Acres to the north, Sewickley Heights to the east, and Sewickley to the southeast. Adjacent across the Ohio River to the southwest are the townships of Moon and Crescent.

== Demographics ==
Historical population
Census	Pop.	Note	%±
1910	1,229		—
1920	1,373		11.7%
1930	1,679		22.3%
1940	1,696		1.0%
1950	1,466		−13.6%
1960	2,030		38.5%
1970	2,200		8.4%
1980	1,738		−21.0%
1990	1,670		−3.9%
2000	1,730		3.6%
2010	1,680		−2.9%
2020	1,669		−0.7%

As of the 2000 census, there were 1,730 people, 644 households, and 510 families residing in the borough. The population density was 1,133.6 inhabitants per square mile (437.7/km^{2}). There were 671 housing units at an average density of 439.7 per square mile (169.8/km^{2}). The racial makeup of the borough was 95.84% White, 1.97% African American, 0.35% Native American, 0.92% Asian, 0.06% Pacific Islander, 0.06% from other races, and 0.81% from two or more races. Hispanic or Latino of any race were 0.87% of the population.

There were 644 households, out of which 37.6% had children under the age of 18 living with them, 70.2% were married couples living together, 7.8% had a female householder with no husband present, and 20.8% were non-families. 19.7% of all households were made up of individuals, and 11.3% had someone living alone who was 65 years of age or older. The average household size was 2.69 and the average family size was 3.10.

In the borough the population was spread out, with 30.2% under the age of 18, 3.1% from 18 to 24, 21.6% from 25 to 44, 29.1% from 45 to 64, and 16.0% who were 65 years of age or older. The median age was 42 years. For every 100 females, there were 88.7 males. For every 100 females age 18 and over, there were 84.1 males.

As of 2015, the estimated median income for a household in the borough was $155,170, and the median income for a family was $183,750. Males had median earnings of $143,125 versus $70,625 for females. About 1.2% of families and 2.2% of the population were below the poverty line, including 2.2% of those under age 18 and 1.1% of those age 65 or over.

== Government and politics ==
Presidential elections results
Year	Republican	Democratic	Third parties
2020	39% 472	58% 702	1% 18
2016	43% 456	53% 560	4% 50
2012	59% 596	40% 408	1% 8

== Education ==
Sewickley Academy, a private coeducational day school, is located in Edgeworth. Edgeworth Elementary School of the Quaker Valley School District is also located in Edgeworth.

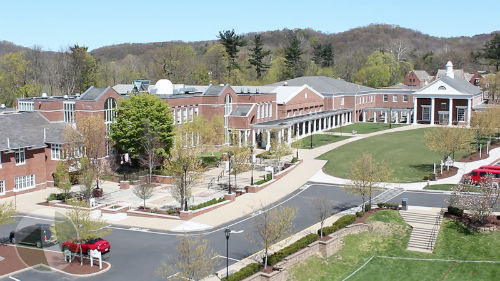
Sewickley Academy Campus

== Notable people ==
- Sidney Crosby, NHL center
- Glen Meakem, venture capitalist and radio host
- Arthur Nevin, American composer, conductor, teacher, and musicologist
- Ethelbert Nevin, American pianist and composer
- Thomas Tull, American billionaire businessman, entrepreneur, and film producer

== See also ==
- List of cities and towns along the Ohio River
- Ethelbert Nevin
