= Sewickley Heights, Pennsylvania =

Borough in Pennsylvania, US

- Borough
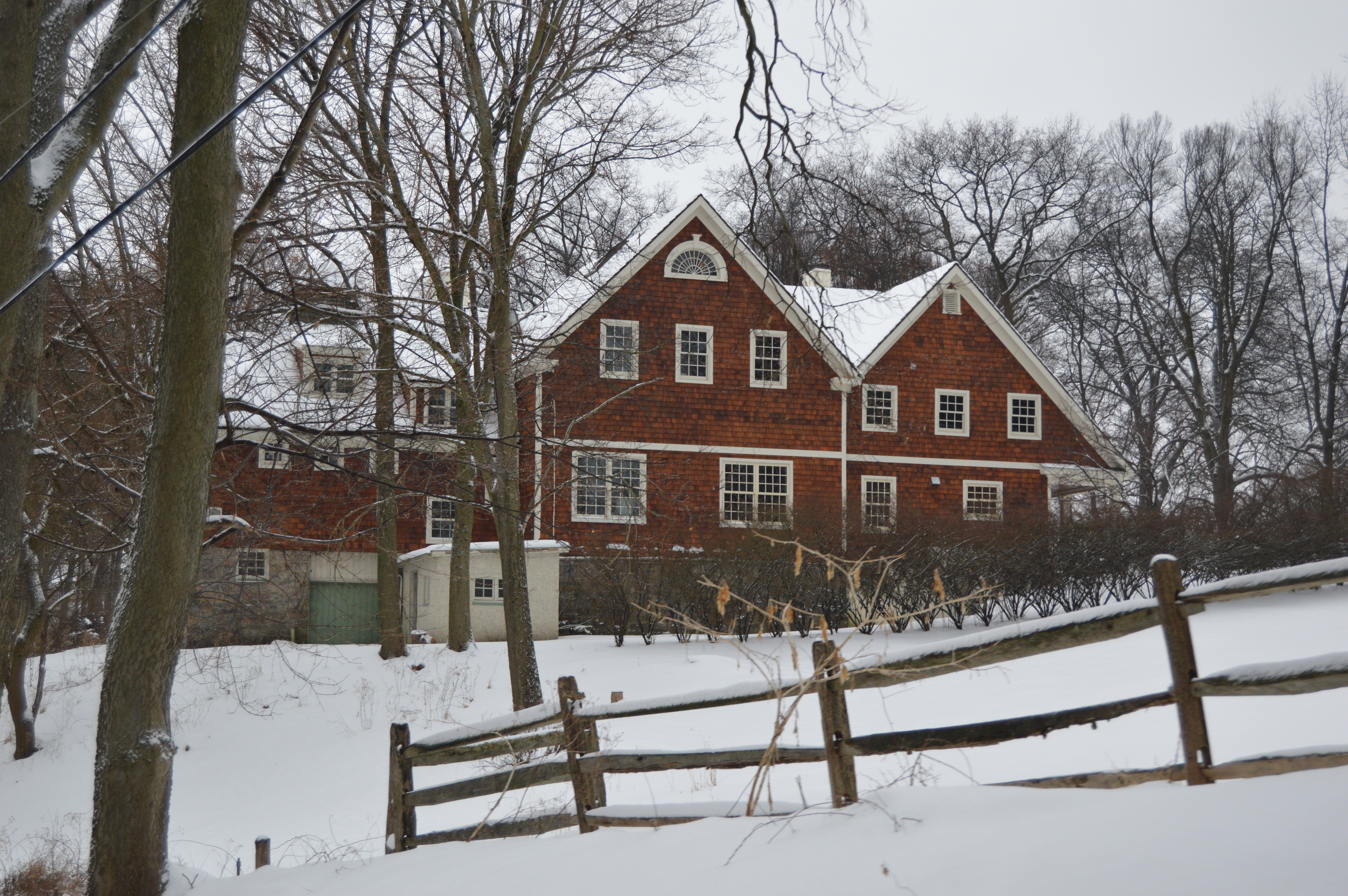
- House on Backbone Road

- Location in Allegheny County and the U.S. state of Pennsylvania.
- Coordinates: 40°33′40″N 80°9′20″W
- Country: United States
- State: Pennsylvania
- County: Allegheny

Government
  - Mayor: George J. Magovern, Jr., M.D.

Area
  - Total: 7.32 sq mi (18.97 km^{2})
  - Land: 7.32 sq mi (18.97 km^{2})
  - Water: 0 sq mi (0.00 km^{2})

Population (2020)
  - Total: 857
  - Estimate (2019): 807
  - Density: 110.2/sq mi (42.54/km^{2})
- Time zone: UTC-5 (Eastern (EST))
  - Summer (DST): UTC-4 (EDT)
- ZIP code: 15143
- Area code: 412
- FIPS code: 42-69400
- Website: www.sewickleyheightsboro.com

Sewickley Heights is a borough in Allegheny County, Pennsylvania, United States. The population was 857 at the 2020 census. It is a residential suburb of the Pittsburgh metropolitan area. Sewickley Heights is one of the wealthiest municipalities in Pennsylvania and in the United States.

== History ==
Sewickley Heights was established as a borough in 1935, but the area's character was largely established with the move of the Allegheny Country Club from Pittsburgh to its Sewickley Heights location in 1902. The establishment of the country club accelerated the settlement of the area as a haven for wealthy Pittsburgh residents. Many estates established in Sewickley Heights up through the 1930s occupied hundreds of acres with houses of immense proportions. Among the grandest estates was As You Like It, the estate of banker, shipper and investor William Thaw. As You Like It was featured in a 1903 print advertisement of the United States Battery Company that promoted electric lighting for country homes. Other notable estates included the Henry Robinson Rea mansion, Farmhill (which hosted Madame Curie in May 1921), and B. F. Jones' 100-room mansion, Fairacres.

Many of the grand estates in Sewickley Heights began to fall into disrepair in the 1950s and 1960s. Many of the original massive houses were demolished and the lots subdivided. Sewickley Heights preserved the country character of the borough by requiring minimum lot sizes of 5 acres (20,000 m^{2}), though many homes are on substantially larger parcels. Many "neighborhoods" of Sewickley Heights are named after the original estate and the clusters of homes on the estate parcel are marked by unique stone fences original to the old estate.

In the 1960s and 1970s, several parcels of land were donated or purchased to form the Sewickley Heights Borough Park. The park now occupies approximately 600 acres (2.4 km^{2}) and is renowned regionally for its hiking and horse-riding trails and other recreation areas. Sewickley Heights is also home to the Fern Hollow Nature Center and the Sewickley Heights History Center, which are co-located on a 33-acre (130,000 m^{2}) site.

== Geography ==
Sewickley Heights is located at 40°33′40″N 80°9′20″W (40.561091, −80.155541).

According to the United States Census Bureau, the borough has a total area of 7.3 square miles (19 km^{2}), all land.

=== Surrounding neighborhoods ===
Sewickley Heights borders five areas, including Bell Acres to the north and northwest, Sewickley Hills to the east and northeast, Aleppo Township to the south, Sewickley to the southwest, and Edgeworth to the west.

== Demographics ==
Historical population
Census	Pop.	Note	%±
1910	773		—
1920	654		−15.4%
1930	982		50.2%
1940	748		−23.8%
1950	679		−9.2%
1960	931		37.1%
1970	797		−14.4%
1980	899		12.8%
1990	984		9.5%
2000	981		−0.3%
2010	810		−17.4%
2020	857		5.8%

As of the 2000 census, 981 people, 336 households, and 273 families resided in the borough. The population density was 133.9 inhabitants per square mile (51.7/km^{2}). The 355 housing units averaged 48.5 per square mile (18.7/km^{2}). The racial makeup of the borough was 97.35% White, 0.92% African American, 0.61% Asian, 0.20% from other races, and 0.92% from two or more races. Hispanics or Latinos of any race were 0.31% of the population.

Of the 336 households, 29.5% had children under the age of 18 living with them, 75.0% were married couples living together, 4.8% had a female householder with no husband present, and 18.5% were not families. About 16.1% of all households were made up of individuals, and 6.8% had someone living alone who was 65 years of age or older. The average household size was 2.56, and the average family size was 2.87.

In the borough, the population was distributed as 20.6% under the age of 18, 3.5% from 18 to 24, 17.8% from 25 to 44, 30.1% from 45 to 64, and 28.0% who were 65 years of age or older. The median age was 50 years. For every 100 females, there were 74.6 males. For every 100 females age 18 and over, there were 74.3 males.

The median income for a household in the borough was $115,672, and for a family was $158,756. Males had a median income of $89,473 versus $40,417 for females. The per capita income for the borough was $79,541 placing it at number 99 on the list of highest-income places in the United States. About 5.2% of families and 7.0% of the population were below the poverty line, including 10.0% of those under age 18 and 3.7% of those age 65 or over.

== Government and politics ==
Sewickley Heights is a reliably Republican jurisdiction in presidential elections. In every presidential election since 1932, the GOP has carried the borough. From 1944 to 1988, every Republican nominee for president exceeded 70% of the vote in the borough, with nine of their 12 campaigns breaking 80% of the vote, in spite of only Dwight D. Eisenhower in 1956 and Richard M. Nixon in 1972 actually winning Allegheny County, and multiple candidates in that span losing Pennsylvania.

The best showing for a Republican is the 89.72% of the vote won by Thomas E. Dewey in 1948.

The borough has been somewhat less Republican in the 21st century, however. Donald Trump carried the borough thrice, but by less than 20 points each time, with the best showing by a Democrat for president being the 45.47% of the vote won by Joe Biden in 2020.

In the 1912 presidential election, in addition to the totals listed for the Bull Moose Party, Republican and Democratic nominees, Socialist nominee Eugene V. Debs received eight votes and Prohibition nominee Eugene Chafin got five.

Sewickley Heights also supported the Republican in at least 15 of the last 18 gubernatorial elections, including Raymond Broderick in 1970, Scott Wagner in 2018, and Barbara Hafer in 1990, in spite of Broderick losing Allegheny County by 24 points, Wagner by 36, and Hafer by a margin of nearly 44 points. Hafer also lost the election statewide by a margin of nearly 34 points.

However Sewickley Heights voted for Democrat Josh Shapiro over Republican gubernatorial nominee Doug Mastriano in 2022.

Sewickley Heights borough vote by party in presidential elections
Year	Democratic	Republican	Third parties
2024	45.32% 286	52.93% 334	1.74% 11
2020	45.47% 286	52.94% 333	1.59% 10
2016	40.57% 226	55.12% 307	4.31% 24
2012	26.46% 150	72.66% 412	0.88% 5
2008	33.52% 179	66.10% 353	0.37% 2
2004	28.68% 152	71.13% 377	0.19% 1
2000	19.67% 95	79.50% 384	0.83% 4
1996	16.63% 74	80.90% 360	2.47% 11
1992	15.58% 74	69.89% 332	14.53% 69
1988	15.84% 73	84.16% 388	0.00% 0
1984	16.63% 78	83.37% 391	0.00% 0
1980	12.23% 56	81.22% 372	6.55% 30
1976	15.72% 69	84.28% 370	0.00% 0
1972	15.61% 69	84.39% 373	0.00% 0
1968	16.55% 71	76.00% 326	7.46% 32
1964	29.61% 122	70.39% 290	0.00% 0
1960	14.62% 62	85.38% 362	0.00% 0
1956	20.00% 31	80.00% 124	0.00% 0
1952	22.09% 36	77.91% 127	0.00% 0
1948	9.89% 25	89.72% 227	0.40% 1
1944	19.01% 46	80.99% 196	0.00% 0
1940	39.61% 61	60.39% 93	0.00% 0
1936	23.60% 76	76.40% 246	0.00% 0
1932	32.67% 99	67.33% 204	0.00% 0
1920	14.07% 19	82.22% 111	0.37% 5
1912	24.53% 26	23.58% 25	39.62% 42
1904	17.28% 14	82.72% 67	0.00% 0

Sewickley Heights borough vote by party in gubernatorial elections
Year	Democratic	Republican	Third parties
2022	51.87% 264	46.76% 238	1.38% 7
2018	48.02% 231	51.14% 246	0.83% 4
2014	23.48% 77	76.52% 251	0.00% 0
2010	25.30% 106	74.46% 312	0.24% 1
2002	22.67% 73	76.09% 245	1.24% 4
1994	11.11% 42	79.89% 302	8.99% 34
1990	39.67% 119	60.33% 181	0.00% 0
1986	15.08% 54	84.92% 304	0.00% 0
1982	8.85% 33	91.15% 340	0.00% 0
1978	14.05% 52	85.95% 318	0.00% 0
1974	19.42% 60	80.58% 249	0.00% 0
1970	24.39% 80	75.61% 248	0.00% 0
1966	11.97% 45	88.03% 331	0.00% 0
1962	7.42% 31	92.58% 387	0.00% 0
1958	14.29% 45	85.71% 270	0.00% 0
1954	17.45% 52	82.55% 2746	0.00% 0

== Education ==
Sewickley Heights is one of 11 communities served by the Quaker Valley School District.
