= Glen Osborne, Pennsylvania =

Borough in Pennsylvania, US

- Borough
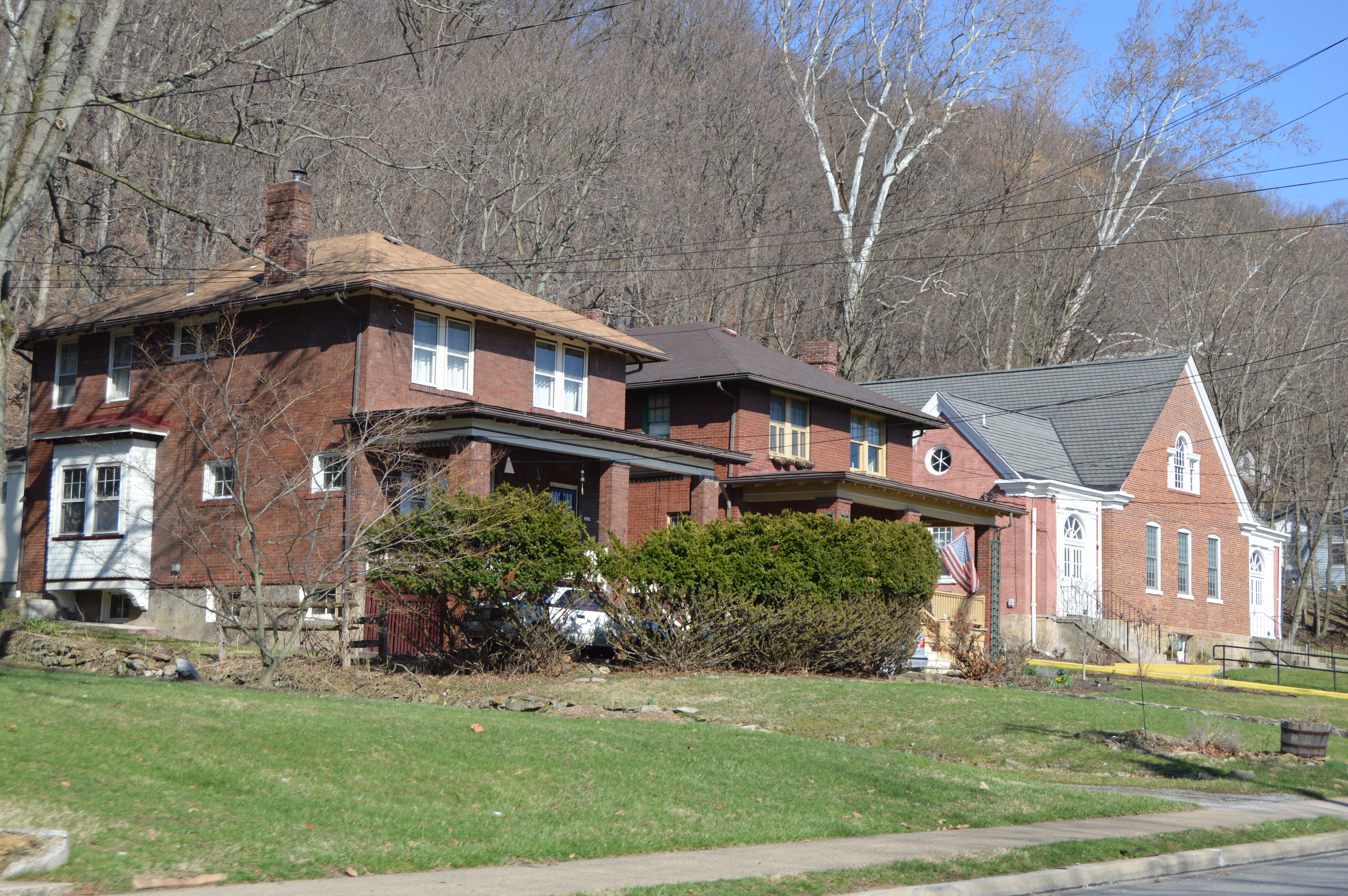
- Neighborhood on Beaver Street

- Coat of arms

- Location in Allegheny County and the U.S. state of Pennsylvania.
- Coordinates: 40°31′51″N 80°10′9″W
- Country: United States
- State: Pennsylvania
- County: Allegheny
- Incorporated: 1883, as Osborne
- Renamed: 2008, as Glen Osborne

Government
  - Mayor: Barbara Carrier (D)

Area
  - Total: 0.56 sq mi (1.45 km^{2})
  - Land: 0.43 sq mi (1.11 km^{2})
  - Water: 0.13 sq mi (0.34 km^{2})

Population (2020)
  - Total: 590
  - Density: 1,371.5/sq mi (529.53/km^{2})
- Time zone: UTC-5 (Eastern (EST))
  - Summer (DST): UTC-4 (EDT)
- FIPS code: 42-29732
- GNIS: 1214815
- Website: Borough website

Glen Osborne is a borough in Allegheny County, Pennsylvania, United States, along the Ohio River. The population was 590 at the 2020 census. It is a residential suburb of the Pittsburgh metropolitan area.

== History ==
The area that now comprises the borough was first surveyed by Nathaniel Breading following the Revolutionary War. Early settlers of the area included Henry Pratt in 1786 and James Park in 1805. The area became known as "Glen Osborne", the glen referring to a Scottish term for a valley formed by a stream, and "Osborne" for local landowner Frank Osborne. By 1851, the Pittsburgh, Fort Wayne and Chicago Railroad was built through what was then part of Pitt and Ohio townships and a station opened in the community named "Osborne" to prevent confusion from a similarly named station. In 1883 following petitioning by local residents, the borough of Osborne was incorporated.

In 2008, borough officials led by then-mayor William P. Boswell petitioned the state to allow the renaming of the borough to Glen Osborne to reflect the name residents have been using for over one hundred years. A judge granted the name change on May 21 of that year, leading to the immediate replacement of road signs and phasing out of the old name on stationery and welcome signs in the borough.

== Geography ==
Glen Osborne is located at 40°31′51″N 80°10′9″W (40.530892, −80.169248).

According to the United States Census Bureau, the borough has a total area of 0.6 square miles (1.6 km^{2}), of which 0.4 square miles (1.0 km^{2}) is land and 0.1 square miles (0.26 km^{2}), or 21.05%, is water. The borough is located on the north side of the Ohio River.

The borough is home to Mary Roberts Rinehart Nature Park, a nature park featuring trails that wind through ravine and floodplain forest and past planted pollinator gardens.

=== Surrounding and adjacent neighborhoods ===
Glen Osborne has three land borders, with the borough of Sewickley to the northwest, Aleppo Township to the north, northeast and east, and the borough of Haysville to the southeast. Across the Ohio River, Glen Osborne is adjacent with the borough of Coraopolis to the south and southeast, and Moon Township to the southwest.

== Demographics ==
Historical population
Census	Pop.	Note	%±
1890	221		—
1900	362		63.8%
1910	425		17.4%
1920	358		−15.8%
1930	506		41.3%
1940	529		4.5%
1950	496		−6.2%
1960	609		22.8%
1970	579		−4.9%
1980	529		−8.6%
1990	565		6.8%
2000	566		0.2%
2010	547		−3.4%
2020	590		7.9%

As of the 2000 census, there were 566 people, 216 households, and 168 families residing in the borough. The population density was 1,262.9 inhabitants per square mile (487.6/km^{2}). There were 222 housing units at an average density of 495.3 per square mile (191.2/km^{2}). The racial makeup of the borough was 98.06% White, 1.59% African American, 0.18% from other races, and 0.18% from two or more races. Hispanic or Latino of any race were 0.35% of the population.

There were 216 households, out of which 37.0% had children under the age of 18 living with them, 67.1% were married couples living together, 7.4% had a female householder with no husband present, and 22.2% were non-families. 19.4% of all households were made up of individuals, and 9.7% had someone living alone who was 65 years of age or older. The average household size was 2.61 and the average family size was 2.97.

In the borough the population was spread out, with 27.7% under the age of 18, 3.2% from 18 to 24, 21.0% from 25 to 44, 32.5% from 45 to 64, and 15.5% who were 65 years of age or older. The median age was 44 years. For every 100 females, there were 90.6 males. For every 100 females age 18 and over, there were 87.6 males.

The median income for a household in the borough was $64,375, and the median income for a family was $71,667. Males had a median income of $65,455 versus $41,875 for females. The per capita income for the borough was $50,169. About 8.0% of families and 10.8% of the population were below the poverty line, including 12.5% of those under age 18 and 16.8% of those age 65 or over.

== Government and politics ==
Presidential election results
Year	Republican	Democratic	Third parties
2020	39% 157	59% 237	1% 5
2016	43% 138	57% 185	0% 1
2012	52% 172	47% 154	1% 4

== See also ==
- List of cities and towns along the Ohio River
