= List of longest continuous truss bridge spans =

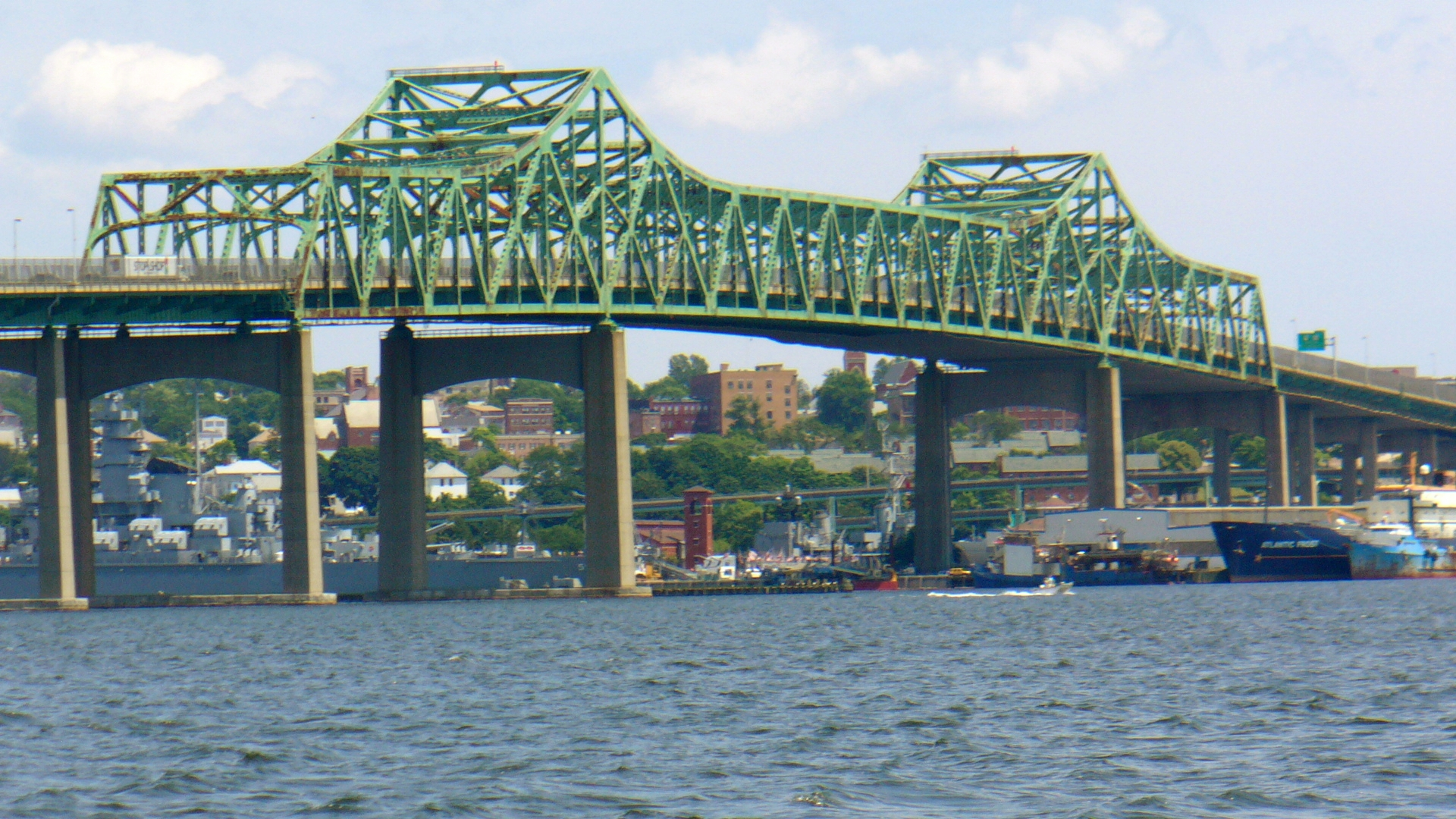
The Braga Bridge is a continuous truss bridge. It was the fourth longest span of this type when it was completed in 1966.

This list of continuous bridge spans ranks the world's continuous truss bridges in two listings: The first is ranked by the length of main span (the longest length of unsupported roadway) and the second by the total length of continuous truss spans.

Both lists include bridges that act primarily as a continuous truss. These bridges may appear to be—or may incorporate elements of—a different design. For example, the now destroyed Francis Scott Key Bridge incorporated an arch shape into the design, but was continuous across multiple spans. The Key Bridge acted first as a continuous truss bridge and secondarily as an arch bridge. This list does not include cantilever bridges.

Only bridges that are currently in use are included in the rankings. Bridges currently being planned, designed, or constructed and bridges that have been destroyed or demolished are noted separately.

== List ranked by length of main span ==
The length of main span is the most common method of comparing the size of bridges. The length of the main span will often correlate with the depth of the truss (height the truss from bottom to top) and the engineering complexity involved in designing and constructing the bridge.

For bridges that have the same span length, the older bridge is listed first.

Note: Click on each bridge's rank to go to the bridge's official Web site. Ranks with a red asterisk (*) do not have official Web sites (or they do not have an English-language version) and are linked instead to a reference entry.

	Rank	Name	Location	Main span metres	Main span feet	Year opened
	*	Ikitsuki Bridge (The longest span from 1991 to the present)	Nagasaki Prefecture, Japan	400	1,312	1991
	*	Astoria-Megler Bridge (The longest span from 1966 to 1991)	(United States) Astoria, Oregon, USA	376	1,232	1966
		Francis Scott Key Bridge (destroyed in 2024)	(United States) Baltimore, Maryland, USA	366	1,200	1977
		Hart Bridge	(United States) Jacksonville, Florida, USA	331	1,088	1967
	*	Oshima Bridge	Yamaguchi Prefecture, Japan	325	1,066	1976
	*	Tenmon Bridge	Kumamoto Prefecture, Japan	300	984	1966
		Kuronoseto Bridge	Kuronoseto, Japan	300	984	1974
	*	Taylor-Southgate Bridge	(United States) Cincinnati, Ohio / Newport, Kentucky, USA	259	850	1995
	*	Julien Dubuque Bridge	(United States) Dubuque, Iowa / East Dubuque, Illinois, USA	258	845	1943
		Braga Bridge	(United States) Somerset / Fall River, Massachusetts, USA	256	840	1966
	*	Kamakari bridge	Hiroshima Prefecture, Japan	255	837	1979
	*	Earle C. Clements (Shawneetown) Bridge	(United States) Old Shawneetown, Illinois / Union County, Kentucky, USA	251.5	826	1955
	*	Cairo I-57 Bridge	(United States) Charleston, Missouri / Cairo, Illinois, USA	250	821	1978
		Yoshima Bridge	Seto Inland Sea, Japan	245	804	1988
		Governor Harry W. Nice Memorial Bridge (Demolished in 2023)	(United States) Dahlgren, Virginia and Newburg, Maryland, USA	244	800	1940
		Kingston-Rhinecliff Bridge	(United States) Kingston, New York, USA	244	800	1957
	*	Don N. Holt Bridge	(United States) Charleston, South Carolina, USA	244	800	1992
Linked image	*	Phil G McDonald Bridge	(United States) Beckley, West Virginia, USA	239	785	1988
	*	Rochester-Monaca Bridge	(United States) Rochester, Pennsylvania, USA	238	780	1986
	*	Sciotoville Bridge (2 spans)	(United States) Sciotodale, Ohio / Limeville, Kentucky, USA	236	775	1916
	*	Warm Springs Creek Bridge	(United States) Sonoma County, California, USA	230	753	1978
	*	Sewickley Bridge	(United States) Sewickley, Pennsylvania, USA	229	750	1981
		Betsy Ross Bridge	(United States) Philadelphia, Pennsylvania, USA	222	729	1976
	*	Matthew E. Welsh Bridge	(United States) Mauckport, Indiana, USA	221	725	1966

== List ranked by total length ==
It is also possible to rank continuous truss bridges by the sum of the continuous spans.

Note that if the bridge has an expansion joint (a discontinuity), the sections of the bridge would be considered separate (by the definition of a continuous bridge) for the purposes of this ranking. The Yoshima Bridge is an example of this. It consists of two continuous-truss sections that together have five total spans. The first section (or unit) is 2-span continuous, 125 m + 137 m; the second section is a 3-span unit, 165 m + 245 m + 165 m.

Rank	Name	Location	Individual span lengths in meters or feet	Total length in meters (feet)
1	Pakokku Bridge	Pakokku, Myanmar	390 ft	6,278 m (20,597 ft)
	Thanlwin Bridge (Mawlamyine)	Mawlamyine, Myanmar	367 ft	6,596 m (21,640 ft)
	Irrawaddy Bridge (Nyaungdon)	Nyaungdon, Myanmar	390 ft	
2	Dashengguan Bridge	Nanjing, China	108 + 192 + 336 + 336 + 192 + 108 meters	1,272 metres (4,173 ft)
2	Jiujiang Yangtze River Bridge	Jiujiang, China	3*162 + 180 + 216 + 180 + 2*126 m	1,314 m (4,311 ft)
3	Francis Scott Key Bridge (destroyed in 2024)	(United States) Baltimore, Maryland, USA	219.6 + 366 + 219.6 meters	2,640 feet (800 m)
4	Ikitsuki Bridge	Nagasaki Prefecture, Japan	200 + 400 + 200 m	800.0 m (2,624.7 ft)
5	Astoria-Megler Bridge	(United States) Astoria, Oregon, USA	616 + 1,232 + 616 ft	751 m (2,464 ft)

== History of the record span ==
Name	Location	Main span in meters (feet)	Longest from	Longest to
Ikitsuki Bridge	Nagasaki Prefecture, Japan	400 m (1,300 ft)	1991	present
Astoria-Megler Bridge	(United States) Astoria, Oregon, USA	375.6 m (1,232 ft)	1966	1991
Duisburg-Rheinhausen Bridge	Duisburg, Germany	254.5 meters (835 ft)	1945	1966
Sciotoville Bridge	(United States) Sciotodale, Ohio, USA	236 meters (774 ft)	1916	1945
