= Pennsylvania Route 65 =

State highway in Pennsylvania, US

Pennsylvania Route 65
- 65th Infantry Division Memorial Highway

Route information
- Maintained by PennDOT
- Length: 51.731 mi (83.253 km)
- Existed: 1961–present

Major junctions
- South end: I-279 / US 19 Truck in Pittsburgh
- US 19 in Pittsburgh; I-79 in Glenfield; PA 51 in East Rochester; PA 18 / PA 68 in Rochester; US 422 near New Castle
- North end: PA 108 / PA 168 in New Castle

Location
- Country: United States
- State: Pennsylvania
- Counties: Allegheny, Beaver, Lawrence

Highway system
- Pennsylvania State Route System; Interstate; US; State; Scenic; Legislative
← PA 64	→ PA 66

Pennsylvania Route 65 (PA 65, also known as the 65th Infantry Division Memorial Highway) is a major 51-mile-long (82 km) state highway located in western Pennsylvania, United States. The route, traveling north–south from the Interstate 279/U.S. Route 19 Truck (I-279/US 19 Truck) concurrency in Pittsburgh north to the PA 108/PA 168 concurrency in New Castle, connects downtown Pittsburgh to the northwestern portion of the Pittsburgh Metropolitan Area. PA 65 is similar in its purpose to PA 18 and PA 51, both of which run parallel to PA 65 at one point or another; however, the three routes pass through different cities for most of their respective alignments.

The route begins in the Golden Triangle of Pittsburgh as a limited-access highway, following the bank of the Allegheny and Ohio rivers around the Manchester neighborhood, passing north of Acrisure Stadium and west of PNC Park. While limited-access, the road becomes Ohio River Boulevard, named for the river that PA 65 parallels for 25 miles (40 km) between the city of Pittsburgh and the borough of Rochester. Outside of the city, the road becomes a four-lane at-grade roadway to Rochester, with some portions featuring a divided highway. North of Rochester, PA 65 narrows to two lanes and passes through predominantly rural land, running concurrent with PA 18 and PA 288 as it heads north.

In Pittsburgh, the boulevard was one of the deadliest roads in the city from the 1970s to the early 1980s.

== Route description ==
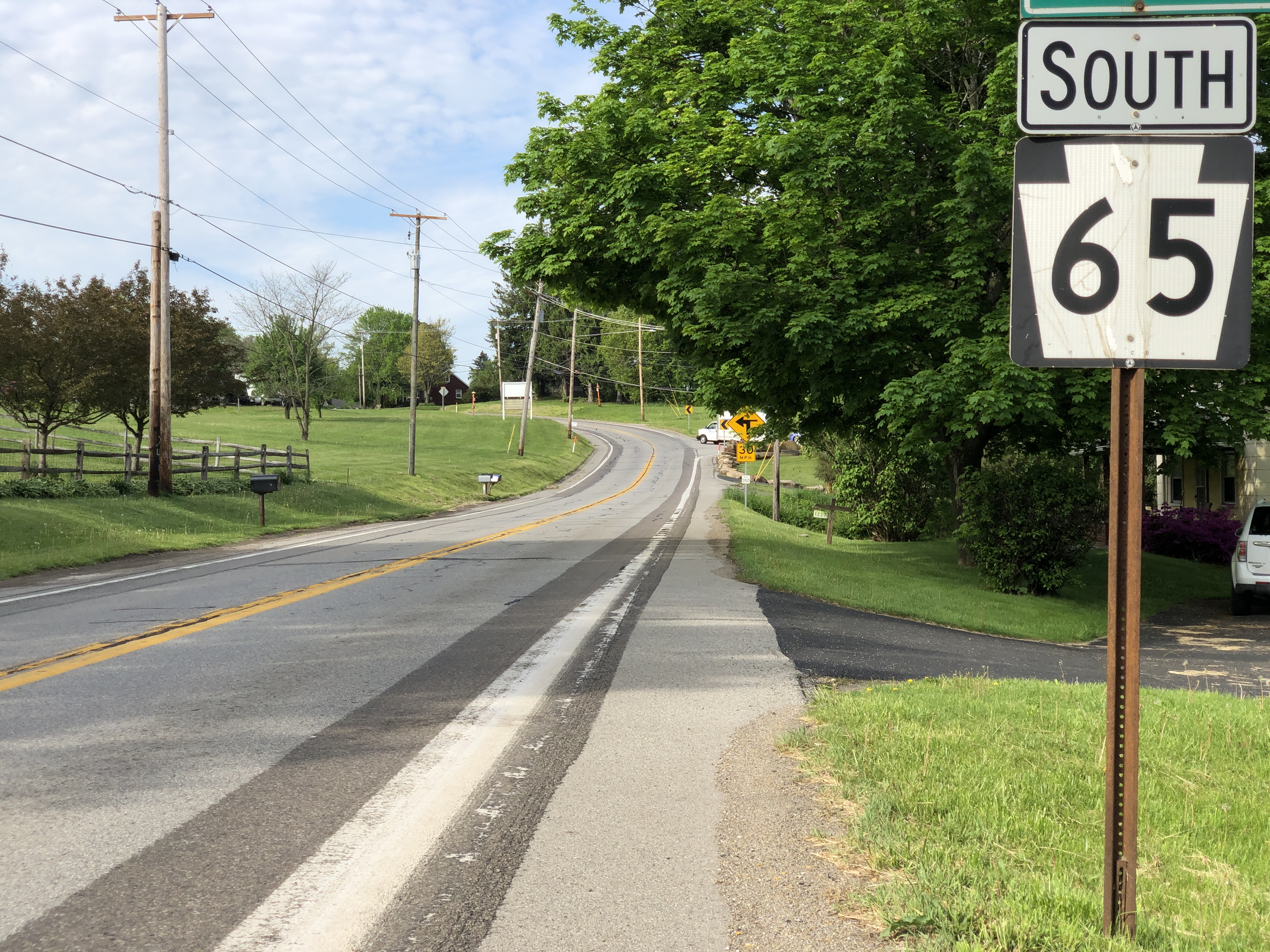
PA 65 southbound in North Sewickley Township

=== Allegheny County ===
PA 65 originates at a triangular-shaped interchange at the I-279/US 19 Truck concurrency near downtown Pittsburgh. Long ramps stretch from exit 1C on I-279 north of the Fort Duquesne Bridge. PA 65 starts as a limited-access highway known as the "Ohio River Boulevard". This was the site of many deadly accidents during the 1970s. The following exit is called "North Shore" and is located only on PA 65 northbound. This exit is the primary entrance to Acrisure Stadium (home to the Pittsburgh Steelers) and it is also a way for drivers to get to PNC Park (home to the Pittsburgh Pirates).

On the following exit, PA 65 makes a loop to the north and begins a concurrency with US 19 at a diamond interchange just north of the West End Bridge. The following two exits (one northbound and another southbound) ends the concurrency between US 19 and PA 65. Beyond US 19, PA 65 returns to at-grade level as a divided highway through the western sections of Pittsburgh. At mile marker 2.9 near the Pittsburgh city line, PA 65 intersects the Blue Belt which crosses the Ohio River to the southwest on the McKees Rocks Bridge.

Outside of Pittsburgh, PA 65 continues as the Ohio River Boulevard on its northwest course and passes through the following boroughs paralleling the Ohio River: Bellevue, Avalon, Ben Avon, and Emsworth. In Emsworth, PA 65 intersects the first terminus of the Green Belt at an intersection with Camp Horne Road. Upon exiting Emsworth, PA 65 returns to a divided highway and interchanges with I-79 and the Yellow Belt at exit 66 in the borough of Glenfield.

West of I-79, PA 65 continues to parallel the Ohio River located to the south. Along the way, PA 65 passes through the boroughs of Haysville and Osborne. In the borough of Sewickley, PA 65 meets the Orange Belt at Broad Street which crosses the Ohio River on the Sewickley Bridge and has direct access to PA 51. Leaving Sewickley, PA 65 crosses through the boroughs of Edgeworth and Leetsdale before exiting Allegheny County. In Leetsdale, PA 65 meets the first terminus of the Red Belt at an intersection involving Cross Street.

=== Beaver County ===
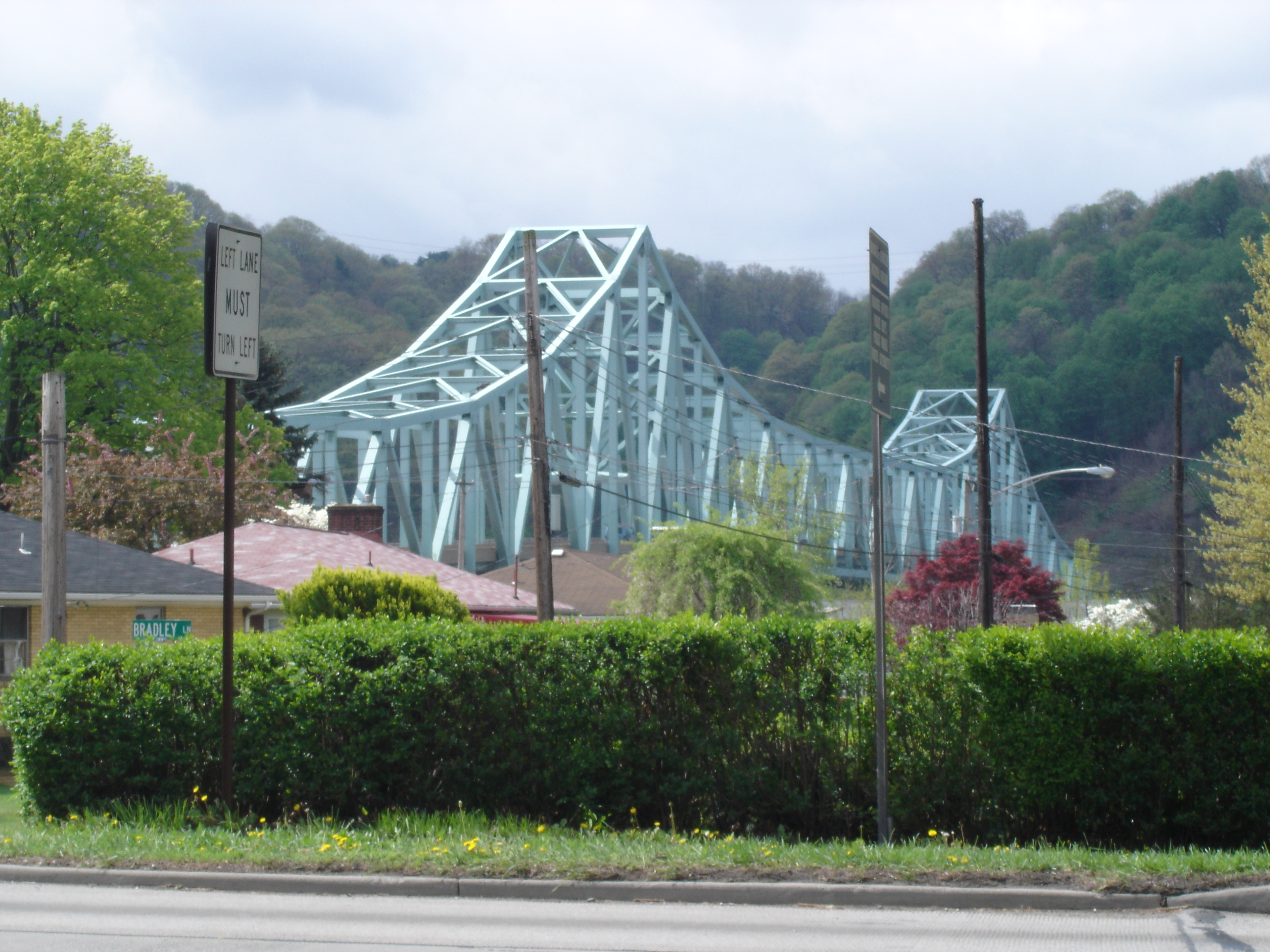
The Sewickley Bridge seen from PA 65 in Sewickley.

Leaving Allegheny County and entering Beaver County, PA 65 traverses the borough of Ambridge. In Ambridge, PA 65 intersects the southern terminus of PA 989. When exiting Ambridge, PA 65 travels to the north paralleling the Ohio River as a divided road as it passes through Baden. In East Rochester, PA 65 follows a concurrency with PA 51, while in Rochester, PA 51/PA 65 intersects PA 18. At mile marker 25.1 in downtown Rochester, a major four-route interchange takes place where PA 51 joins PA 68 and PA 65 continues to the north. In Rochester Township, PA 65 begins a concurrency with PA 18 as it enters the northbound lanes of PA 65 and exits on the southbound lanes.

PA 18/PA 65 continue northward paralleling the Beaver River. In New Brighton, the PA 18/PA 65 concurrency ends when PA 65 makes a 90-degree-angle turn towards the northeast as 5th Street. After a couple of wide turns, PA 65 becomes Mercer Avenue later becoming Mercer Road outside of New Brighton. In North Sewickley Township, PA 65 intersects PA 588 then passes over I-76, the Pennsylvania Turnpike. East of Ellwood City, PA 65 begins another concurrency with PA 288 into Ellwood City. On the south side of Ellwood City, PA 65/PA 288 curve to the north as 2nd Street.

=== Lawrence County ===
In downtown Ellwood City, PA 65/PA 288 intersect the eastern terminus of PA 351 just north of the Beaver–Lawrence county line. North of PA 351, PA 65/PA 288 meet the western terminus of PA 488; at that junction, PA 65/PA 288 make a 90-degree turn to the west and another turn to the north. After crossing the Connoquenessing Creek, the PA 65/PA 288 concurrency comes to an end while PA 65 travels north as North Street, then turns to the east to become Line Avenue, and then shifts towards the north as New Castle Road then becoming Ellwood Road.

In Shenango Township, PA 65 intersects the southern terminus of PA 388 at a "Y" intersection. South of New Castle, PA 65 interchanges with US 422. PA 65 enters the city of New Castle as East Washington Street traveling on a northwest course. At mile marker 50.8, PA 65 intersects US 422 Business which was the former northern terminus of PA 65. In February 2007, PA 65 North was extended to terminate in downtown New Castle at the intersection of PA 108 and PA 168, both signed as Croton Avenue.

== History ==
=== Main history ===
The designation was applied to the current US 62 alignment between Oil City and Ohio from 1928 to 1932. PA 65 was under construction from Mercer to Valley Road in 1928 and completed the following year. On July 15, 1960, PA 65 was designated in its current location replacing the previous PA 88 designation. This designation change was made to reduce the number of concurrent routes in Pittsburgh. The changes took effect a few months later and signs were changed by spring 1961. In 1965, a median was installed between Freedom and Rochester.

In January 1970, construction began on the next section of Ohio River Boulevard from near the California Avenue/Marshall Avenue intersection to Pennsylvania Avenue. In 1973, a $16 million section opened to traffic with plans to continue the expressway to the Fort Duquesne Bridge.

In spring 1987, construction on the $8 million Phase One project to connect the two sections of Ohio River Boulevard together began from Western Avenue to Allegheny Avenue. In January 1988, Phase Two of the project began, which consisted of a new interchange between the expressway and the West End Bridge. The bridge would be closed for two years while it underwent rehabilitation and new ramps were built at the northern end for the interchange. The southern terminus was moved from Western Avenue to I-279 when the missing section in Ohio River Boulevard was finally completed in 1992.

=== Connections with PA 88 ===
While the two are nowhere near each other now, PA 65 and PA 88 were once the same route. In 1961, the routes were split, with the northern portion (New Castle–Pittsburgh) gaining the PA 65 badging while the southern portion (Pittsburgh–Point Marion) retained the PA 88 badging. This was done because the New Castle–Pittsburgh portion was dedicated to the 65th Infantry Division, and the number was changed in honor of that unit.

Although it has been nearly half a century since the redesignation was done, remnants of PA 65 being once part of PA 88 still show in the area. Four of PA 88's five spur routes (PA 288, PA 388, PA 488, and PA 588) are now spur routes of PA 65, but still retain the "88" base numbers. In addition, a drive-in theater known as Spotlight 88 in North Sewickley Township retained its name after the route was redesignated, and is still known by that name as its current incarnation as a flea market after the drive-in was destroyed by an F3 tornado on May 31, 1985, as part of the 1985 United States-Canadian tornado outbreak.

=== Ohio River Boulevard ===
Planning for Ohio River Boulevard started in the 1920s. In 1928, construction began on the boulevard that would run from Manchester to the Borough of Emsworth. The highway would be 40 feet (12 m) wide and have many bridges over local roads. It would end at a traffic circle on the North Shore of the Ohio River at the McKees Rocks Bridge. The route that was built to relieve traffic and accidents on California Avenue was dedicated in August 1931 at a final cost of $12 million.

As traffic on boulevard began to increase in the 1950s and 1960s, many plans were introduced to improve the highway. Ideas ranged from widening the highway to building a new expressway to current day I-79. During the 1960s, a southern extension of the boulevard to Pittsburgh's North Side was discussed and by 1973 the highway opened from the Fort Duquesne Bridge to Ridge Avenue and the McKees Rocks Bridge to Beaver Avenue and Chateau Street. Many of these proposals would fall to the wayside because of lack of funding and interest or community protest. The missing gap which includes a connection to the West End Bridge did not open until January 1992.

By the 1970s, the Ohio River Boulevard section of PA 65 had become a deadly trail. By the mid-1970s, the boulevard became one of Pittsburgh's most dangerous roads. From November 7, 1979, to March 1981, 15 people were killed on the boulevard, eight of those deaths occurring between the McKees Rocks Bridge and Manchester. The deadliest time was in 1980 when seven people were killed on the boulevard.

=== Northern terminus ===
Prior to February 2007, the northern terminus of PA 65 was at US 422 Business, 0.5 miles (0.80 km) southeast of the current northern terminus at PA 108 and PA 168 (Croton Avenue). In February 2007, the route was extended northward from US 422 Business along East Washington Street to Croton Avenue.

== Major intersections ==
All exits are unnumbered.

County	Location	mi	km	Destinations	Notes
Allegheny	Pittsburgh	0.000	0.000	I-279 south / US 19 Truck south (Fort Pitt Bridge) to I-376 – Downtown Pittsburgh, Airport, Monroeville	Southern terminus of PA 65; exit 1C on I-279; southbound exit, northbound entrance
Allegheny	Pittsburgh	0.076– 0.547	0.122– 0.880	North Shore (Reedsdale Street)	Exit 1B on I-279; northbound exit, southbound entrance
Allegheny	Pittsburgh	0.238	0.383	I-279 north / US 19 Truck north (Parkway North) to PA 28 north	Northbound entrance, southbound exit
Allegheny	Pittsburgh	0.748– 1.061	1.204– 1.708	US 19 south (West End Bridge) to PA 51 / Chateau Street / Western Avenue	South end of US 19 concurrency; no access to Chateau Street / Western Avenue from southbound PA 65
Allegheny	Pittsburgh	1.013	1.630	North Shore (Reedsdale Street / Lighthill Street)	Southbound exit only
Allegheny	Pittsburgh	1.594	2.565	US 19 north (Marshall Avenue) / California Avenue	North end of US 19 concurrency; northbound exit, southbound entrance only
Allegheny	Pittsburgh	2.302	3.705	To US 19 north (Marshall Avenue) / Beaver Avenue	Northbound entrance, southbound exit only
Allegheny	Pittsburgh	3.199	5.148	Freeway ends	
Allegheny	Pittsburgh	3.199	5.148	Blue Belt (McKees Rocks Bridge / SR 3104) to PA 51 / Brighton Heights Boulevard	
Allegheny	Emsworth	6.720	10.815	Green Belt begins (Camp Horne Road)	Western terminus of Green Belt
Allegheny	Glenfield	8.460– 9.013	13.615– 14.505	I-79 / Yellow Belt – Erie, Washington, Neville Island	Exit 66 on I-79; access to I-79 north / from I-79 south via Kilbuck Street
Allegheny	Sewickley	11.823	19.027	Orange Belt (River Street (SR 4025)/ Broad Street) – Sewickley Bridge, Airport, Coraopolis	Connects to PA 51
Allegheny	Leetsdale	15.276	24.584	Red Belt begins (Cross Street (SR 4036))	Western terminus of Red Belt
Beaver	Ambridge	16.248	26.149	PA 989 north (8th Street) – Economy	Southern terminus of PA 989
Beaver	Freedom	22.776	36.654	Freedom	Northbound exit, southbound entrance; access via 3rd Avenue
Beaver	Freedom	23.814	38.325	Freedom	Southbound exit, northbound entrance; access via 3rd Avenue. Both northbound and southbound exit guide signs previously indicated "TO PA 856" until that route was decommissioned in 1976.
Beaver	East Rochester	24.147	38.861	PA 51 south (Monaca-East Rochester Bridge) to PA 18 – Monaca	South end of PA 51 concurrency
Beaver	Rochester	24.932– 25.463	40.124– 40.979	PA 18 south (Rochester-Monaca Bridge) / PA 68 east – Rochester	Interchange; no access to northbound PA 65
Beaver	Rochester	25.317	40.744	PA 51 north / PA 68 west – Beaver, Chippewa	Interchange, no southbound exit; north end of PA 51 concurrency
Beaver	Rochester Township	26.233	42.218	PA 18 south to PA 68 – Rochester, Beaver	Southbound exit, northbound entrance; south end of PA 18 concurrency
Beaver	New Brighton	28.476– 28.556	45.828– 45.956	PA 18 north (3rd Avenue / 5th Avenue) – Beaver Falls	North end of PA 18 concurrency
Beaver	North Sewickley Township	33.031	53.158	PA 588 (Bennetts Run Road/Concord Church Road) – Beaver Falls, Zelienople	
Beaver	North Sewickley Township	37.666	60.618	PA 288 east (Ellwood-Zelienople Road) – Zelienople	South end of PA 288 concurrency
Lawrence	Ellwood City	38.609	62.135	PA 351 west (Crescent Avenue)	Eastern terminus of PA 351
Lawrence	Ellwood City	38.902	62.607	PA 488 east (Fountain Avenue)	Western terminus of PA 488
Lawrence	Ellwood City	39.408	63.421	PA 288 west (Wampum Road) – Wampum	North end of PA 288 concurrency
Lawrence	Shenango Township	45.138	72.643	PA 388 north – Eastbrook	Southern terminus of PA 388
Lawrence	Shenango Township	49.234– 49.346	79.234– 79.415	US 422 – Youngstown, Butler	Interchange
Lawrence	New Castle	51.172	82.353	US 422 Bus. (Butler Avenue)	
Lawrence	New Castle	51.731	83.253	PA 108 / PA 168 (Croton Avenue) to PA 18	Northern terminus of PA 65
1.000 mi = 1.609 km; 1.000 km = 0.621 mi: Concurrency terminus; Incomplete access

== PA 65 Truck ==
=== Current ===
==== Beaver County truck route ====
Pennsylvania Route 65 Truck
- Location: Beaver County
- Length: 8.5 mi (13.7 km)

Pennsylvania Route 65 Truck is a connector truck route that directs motorists to PA 65 while avoiding PA 989. Trucks are advised to follow Big Knob Road and PA 68 to avoid a 10-ton weight limit on PA 989 north of this intersection.

=== Former ===
==== Allegheny County truck route ====
Pennsylvania Route 65 Truck
- Location: Allegheny County
- Existed: 2013–2021

Pennsylvania Route 65 Truck (PA 65 Truck) was a truck route of PA 65 that bypasses a weight-restricted bridge over Spruce Run Creek in Ben Avon, on which trucks over 32 tons and combination loads over 40 tons are prohibited. The route was signed in September 2013 and followed the McKees Rocks Bridge over the Ohio River, PA 51, Neville Road, Grand Avenue, and I-79. The bridge was reconstructed and 2021, and PA 65 Truck signs were removed. The route was still signed as recently as 2019; however, the bridge was rehabilitated some time before 2021, and the weight restrictions have since been removed.

==== Lawrence County truck route ====
Pennsylvania Route 65 Truck
- Location: Lawrence County
- Existed: September 2013–December 2018

Pennsylvania Route 65 Truck (PA 65 Truck) was a truck route of PA 65 that bypasses a weight-restricted bridge over an abandoned railroad in Shenango Township, on which trucks over 36 tons and combination loads over 40 tons are prohibited. It was signed in September 2013 and follows US 422 and US 422 Business. The route was removed in December 2018 after the bridge was reconstructed.
