= Cincinnati–Newport Bridge =

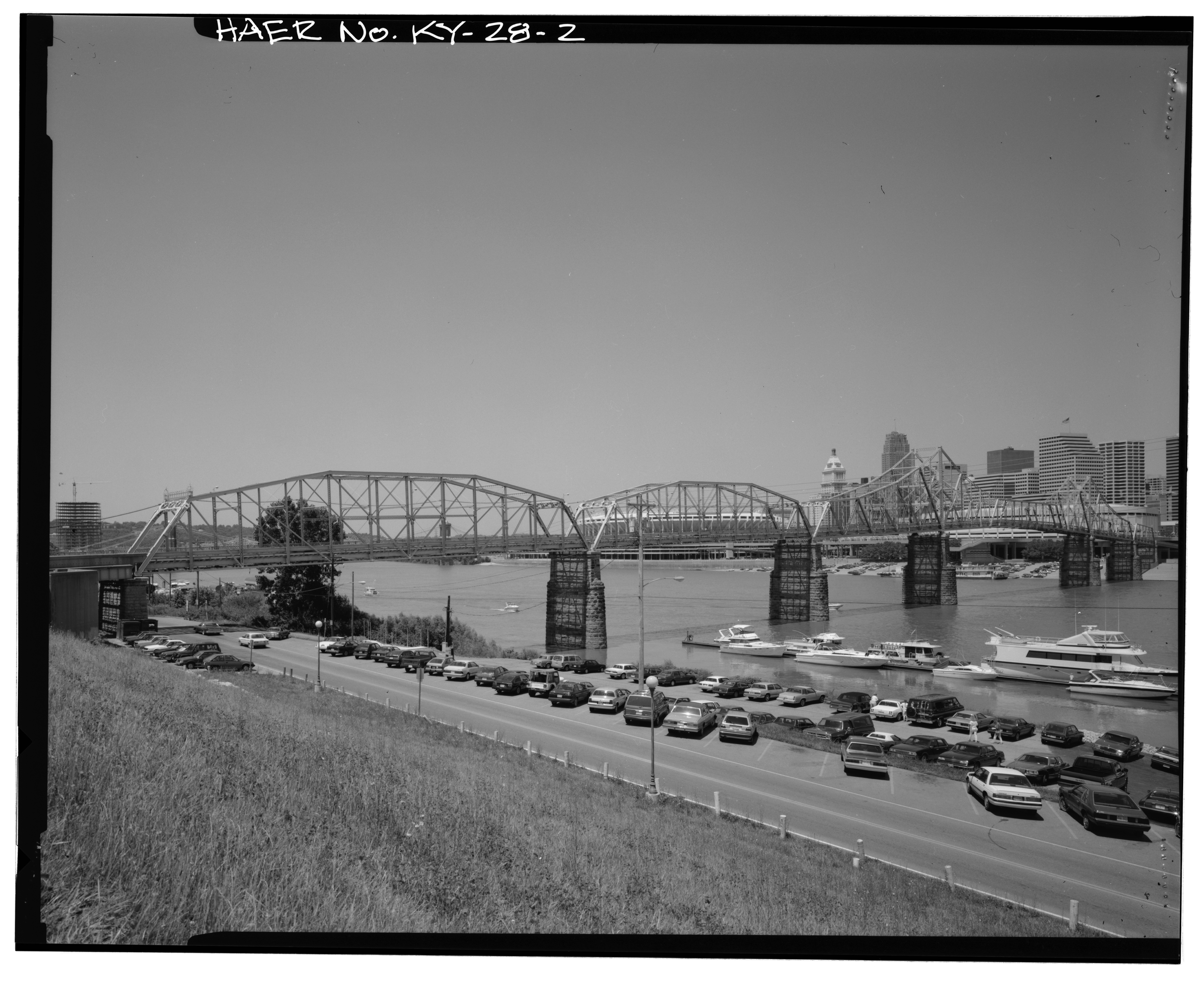
- Coordinates: 39°05′46″N 84°30′04″W
- Crossed: Ohio River
- Locale: Newport, Kentucky
- Official name: Central Bridge
- Named for: Cincinnati–Newport
- Followed by: Taylor-Southgate Bridge

History
- Opened: 1890
- Collapsed: 1992 (Demolished)

Location
- Interactive map of Cincinnati–Newport Bridge

The Cincinnati–Newport Bridge, also known as the Central Bridge, was a cantilever bridge which crossed the Ohio River between Newport, Kentucky, and Cincinnati, Ohio. It was completed in 1890 and demolished in 1992 to make way for the Taylor–Southgate Bridge, which opened in 1995.

Some pieces of the ornate ironwork were transferred from the Cincinnati–Newport Bridge to the Taylor–Southgate Bridge.

== See also ==
- List of bridges documented by the Historic American Engineering Record in Kentucky
- List of bridges documented by the Historic American Engineering Record in Ohio
- List of crossings of the Ohio River
