= West End Bridge =

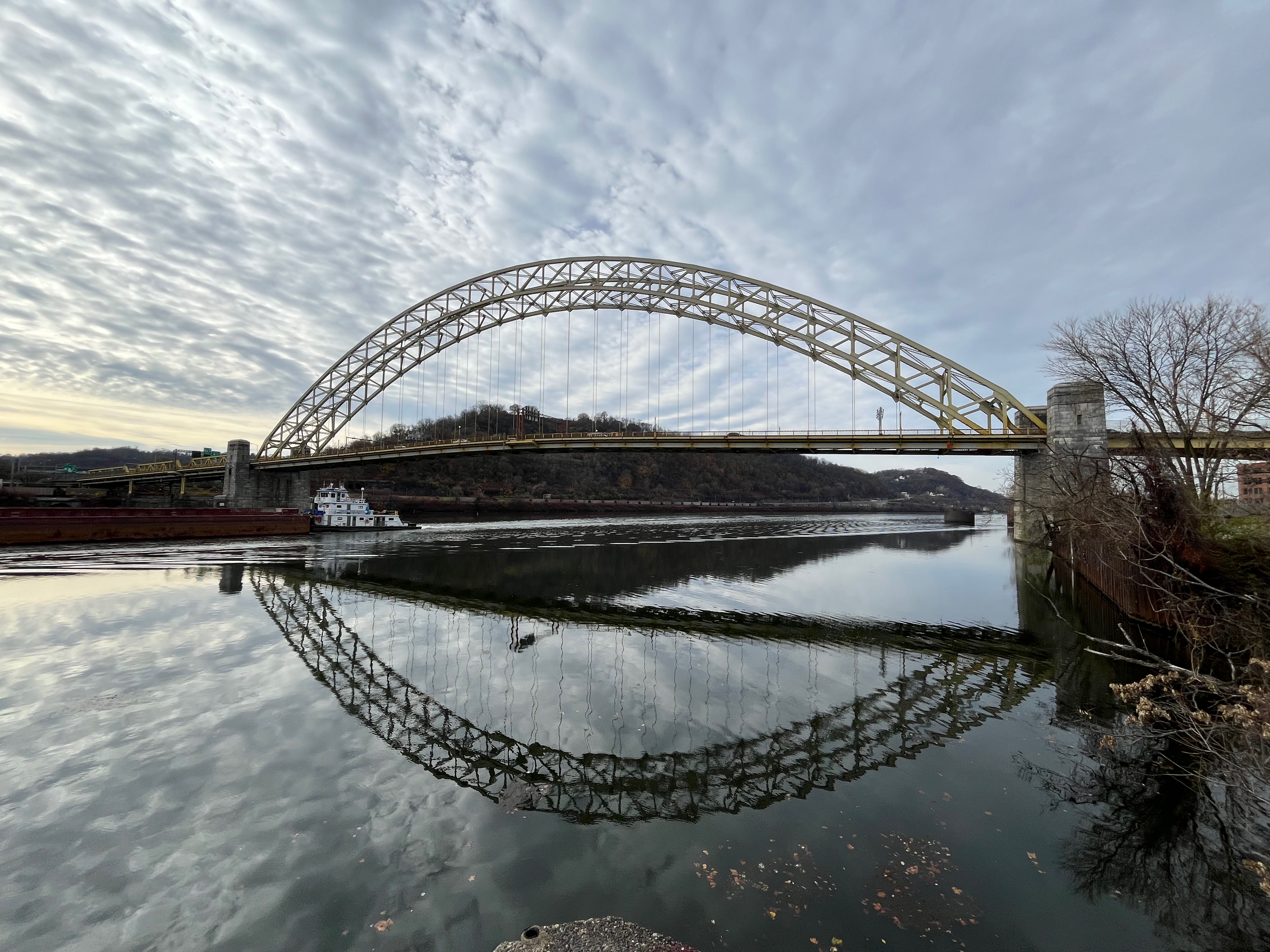
- The bridge in 2025
- Coordinates: 40.44631°N 80.02699°W
- Carries: 4 lanes of US 19; 2 pedestrian walkways
- Crosses: Ohio River
- Locale: Pittsburgh, Pennsylvania
- Official name: Allegheny County Bridge No 3 Ohio River
- Other name: West End-North Side Bridge
- Maintained by: PennDOT

Characteristics
- Design: Tied-arch bridge
- Material: Steel
- Total length: 1,310.75 feet (399.52 m) (current configuration); 1,978.75 feet (603.12 m) (as built)
- Width: 58 feet (18 m)
- Longest span: 780 feet (240 m)
- Piers in water: 1
- Clearance below: 66 feet (20 m) (current configuration); 73 feet (22 m) (as built)

History
- Construction cost: $3,640,000
- Opened: December 2, 1932

Statistics
- Daily traffic: 32,000

U.S. National Register of Historic Places
- Designated: August 24, 1979
- Reference no.: 79003143

Pittsburgh Landmark – PHLF
- Designated: 2001

Location
- Interactive map of West End Bridge

The West End Bridge is a steel tied-arch bridge over the Ohio River in Pittsburgh, Pennsylvania, approximately 1 mile (1.6 km) below the confluence of the Allegheny and Monongahela Rivers. It connects the West End to the Chateau neighborhood on the North Side of Pittsburgh.

== Description ==
As originally built, the West End Bridge consisted of eight spans (listed from south to north):

- Deck girder - 89.75 feet (27.36 m)
- Warren pony truss - 155 feet (47 m)
- Warren pony truss - 140.75 feet (42.90 m)
- Warren pony truss - 145.25 feet (44.27 m)
- Warren pony truss - 145.25 feet (44.27 m)
- Tied-arch main span - 780 feet (240 m)
- Warren pony truss - 178.25 feet (54.33 m)
- Warren pony truss - 157.25 feet (47.93 m)
- Warren pony truss - 157.25 feet (47.93 m)
- Warren pony truss - 175.25 feet (53.42 m)

The four northern approach spans were demolished in 1990 to build a new interchange with Ohio River Boulevard. The roadway measures 40 feet (12 m) curb-to-curb, carrying four traffic lanes, with 9-foot (2.7 m) sidewalks on either side.

When built, the bridge had a clearance of 73 feet (22 m) above the Ohio River. After construction of the Emsworth Dam in 1938, the clearance was reduced to 66 feet (20 m).

== History ==
=== Planning and construction ===
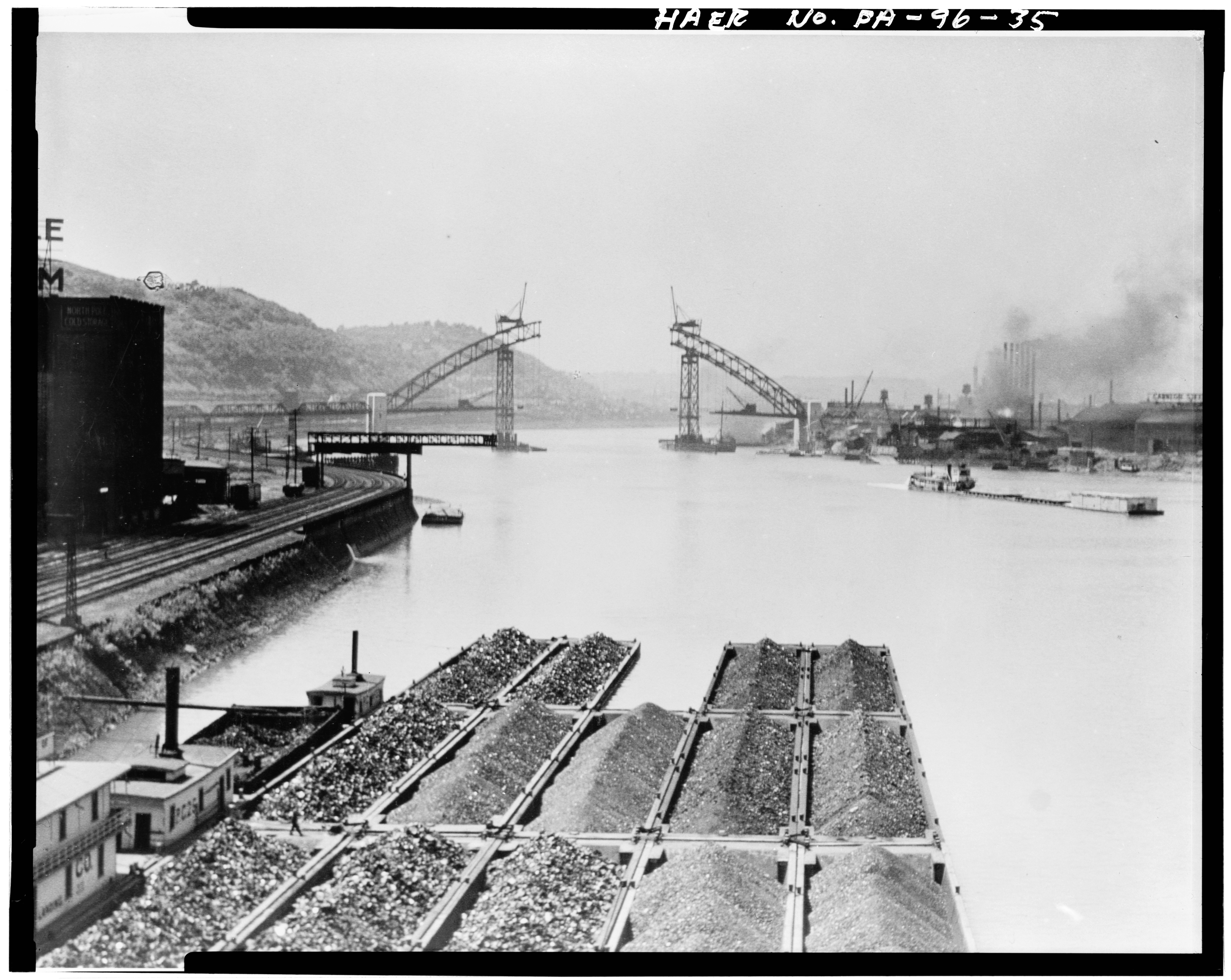
Construction of the West End Bridge

A bridge connecting the North Side to the West End was first proposed in 1912 by Pittsburgh businessman Henry Tranter (1865–1940). Tranter formed a committee to lobby for the bridge and spent more than a decade promoting the project. When the bridge was finally dedicated in 1932, Tranter served as master of ceremonies. For these reasons, he was remembered as the "Father of the West End Bridge".

In 1928, Pittsburgh voters approved a $43.7 million bond issue to fund a variety of public works, including the West End Bridge, McKees Rocks Bridge, South Tenth Street Bridge, Saw Mill Run Boulevard, Allegheny River Boulevard, and Allegheny County Airport. Work on the West End Bridge began in 1930, with the contracts for the substructure and superstructure being awarded to the Foundation Company of New York and the American Bridge Company, respectively.

The bridge was built from 1930 to 1932 primarily by the American Bridge Company (superstructure) and the Foundation Company (substructure). The bridge was designed by George S. Richardson. It was the longest tied-arch bridge in the world when completed, and just the second bridge to use tied-arch technology over a long span, after the Tacony–Palmyra Bridge (1929) in Philadelphia.

The bridge was dedicated five months ahead of schedule on December 2, 1932.

=== Later history ===
In the 1970s, planning began for an interchange at the north end of the bridge which would be the "missing link" between the Fort Duquesne Bridge and the newly expanded Ohio River Boulevard. However, work did not begin until 1990. During the $46 million project, the bridge was fully rehabilitated and its four northern approach spans were replaced with a new set of ramps. It reopened in 1991. The U.S. Department of Transportation determined that removal of the approach spans did not compromise the qualities that made the bridge eligible for the National Register of Historic Places.

The bridge was placed on the National Register of Historic Places in 1979 and the List of Pittsburgh History and Landmarks Foundation Historic Landmarks in 2001.

The Riverlife Task Force conducted a competition in the spring of 2006 to design a pedestrian bridge across the Ohio attached to the West End Bridge. The goal of the competition was to create an iconic architectural element which ties both shore neighborhoods with the waterfronts while eliminating the need for pedestrians to cross traffic lanes and empty lots. The winning design was submitted by Endres Ware (now Endrestudio) in association with OLIN, Ammann & Whitney, Auerbach Glasow, and RWDI.

As of 2016, the bridge and its surrounding approaches are undergoing some major reconstruction.

== Gallery ==
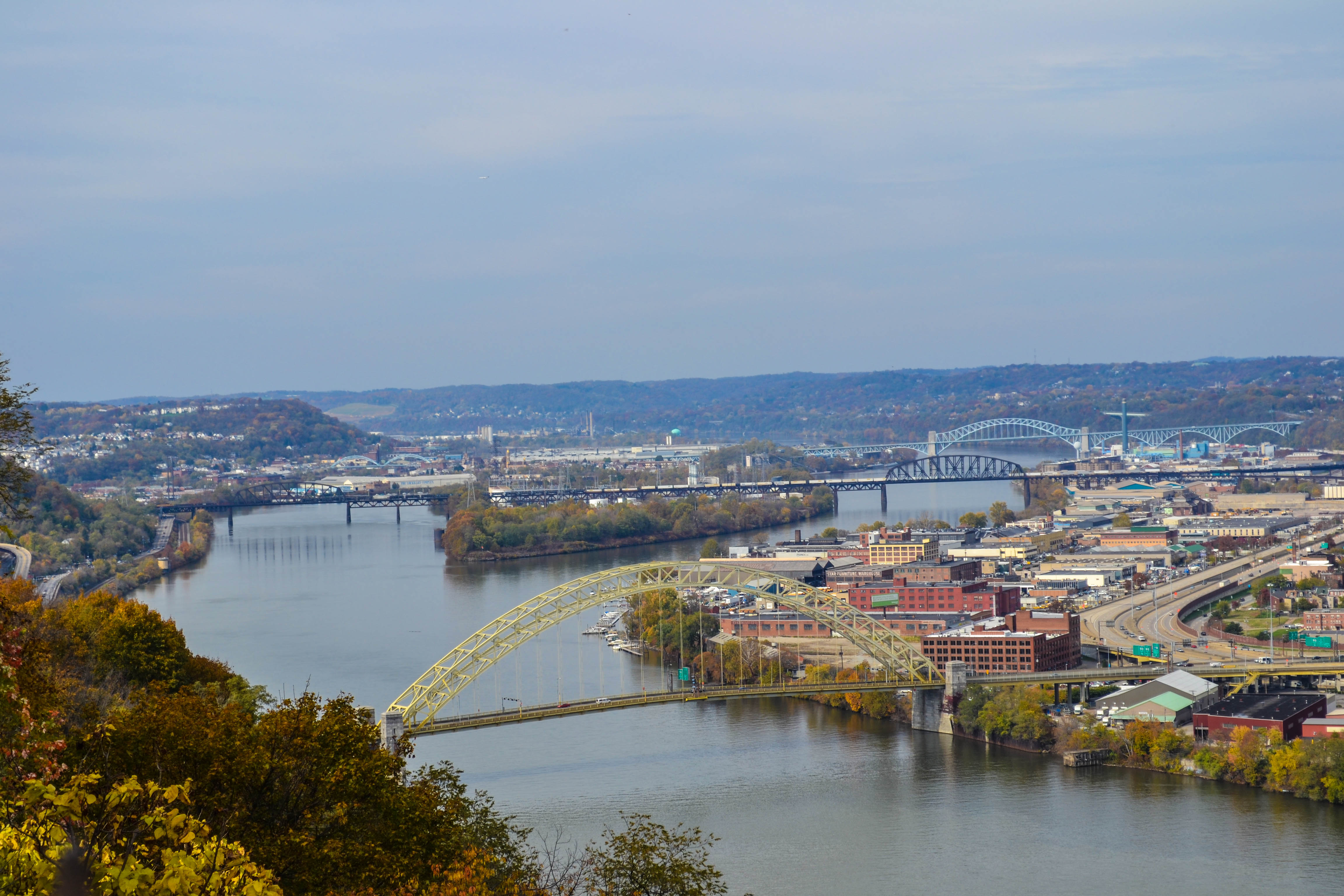
Looking downstream

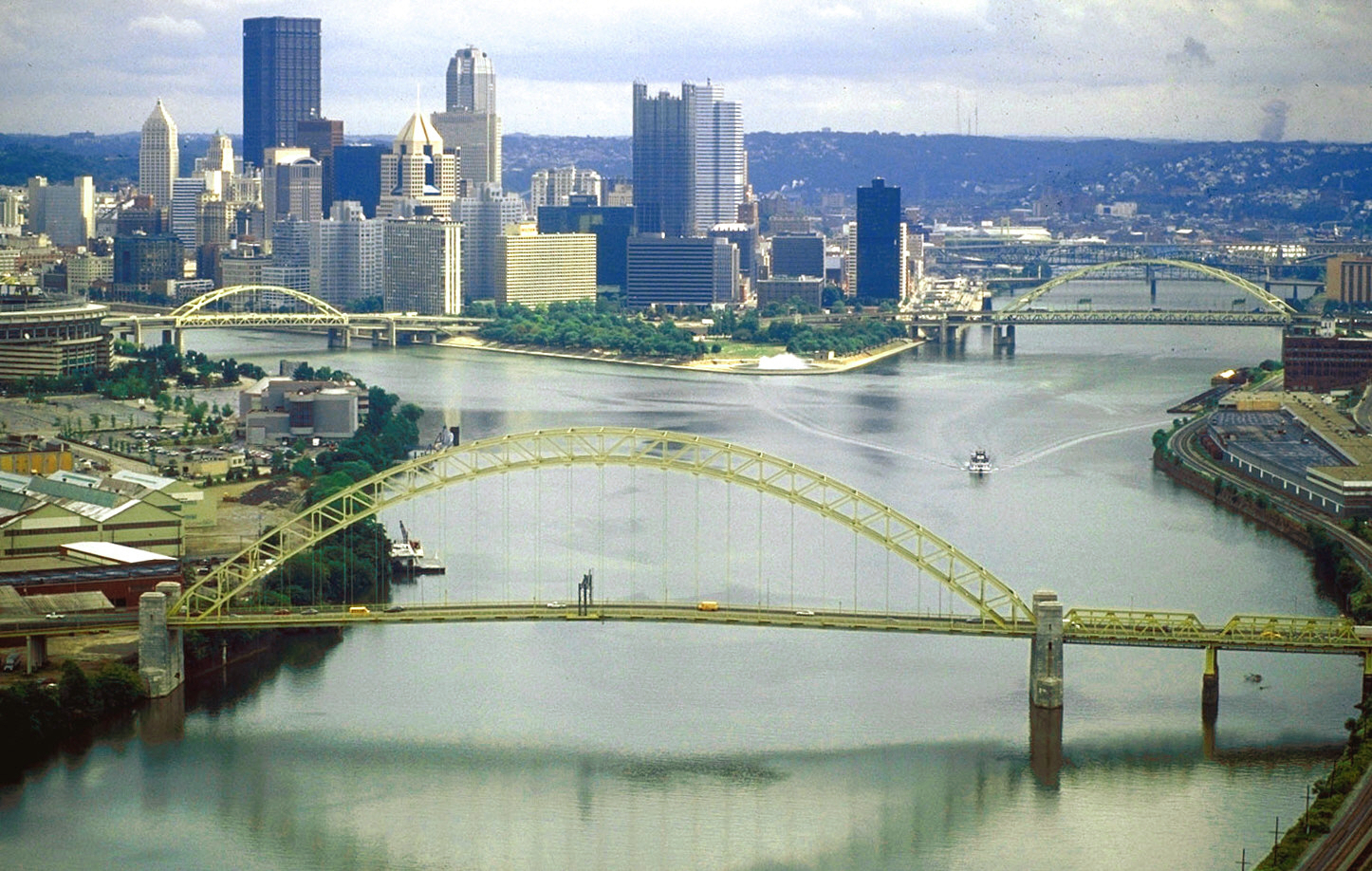
Looking upstream

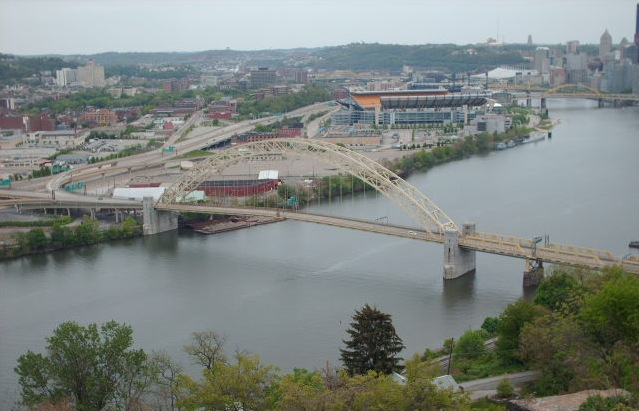
Aerial view

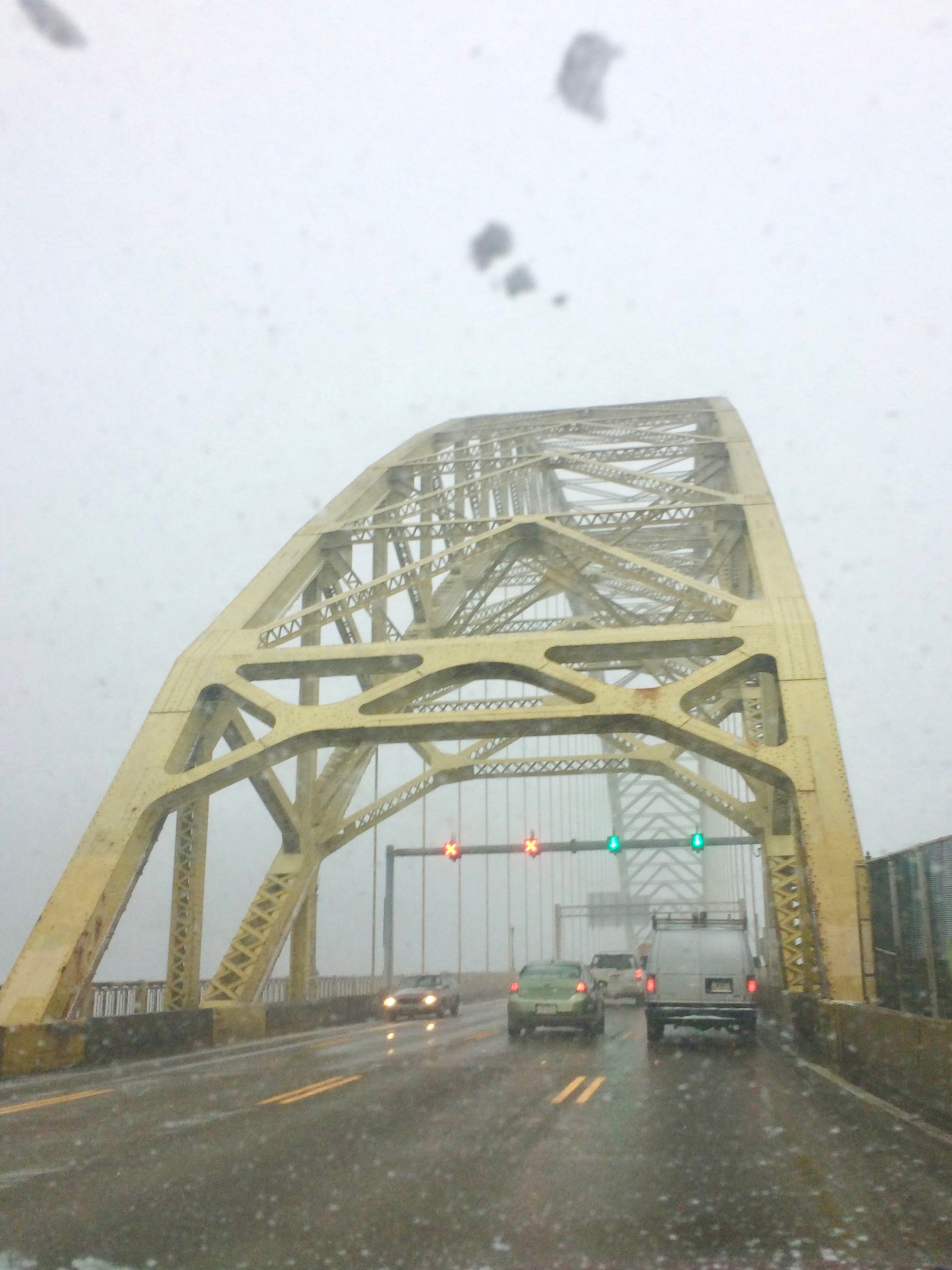
Deck

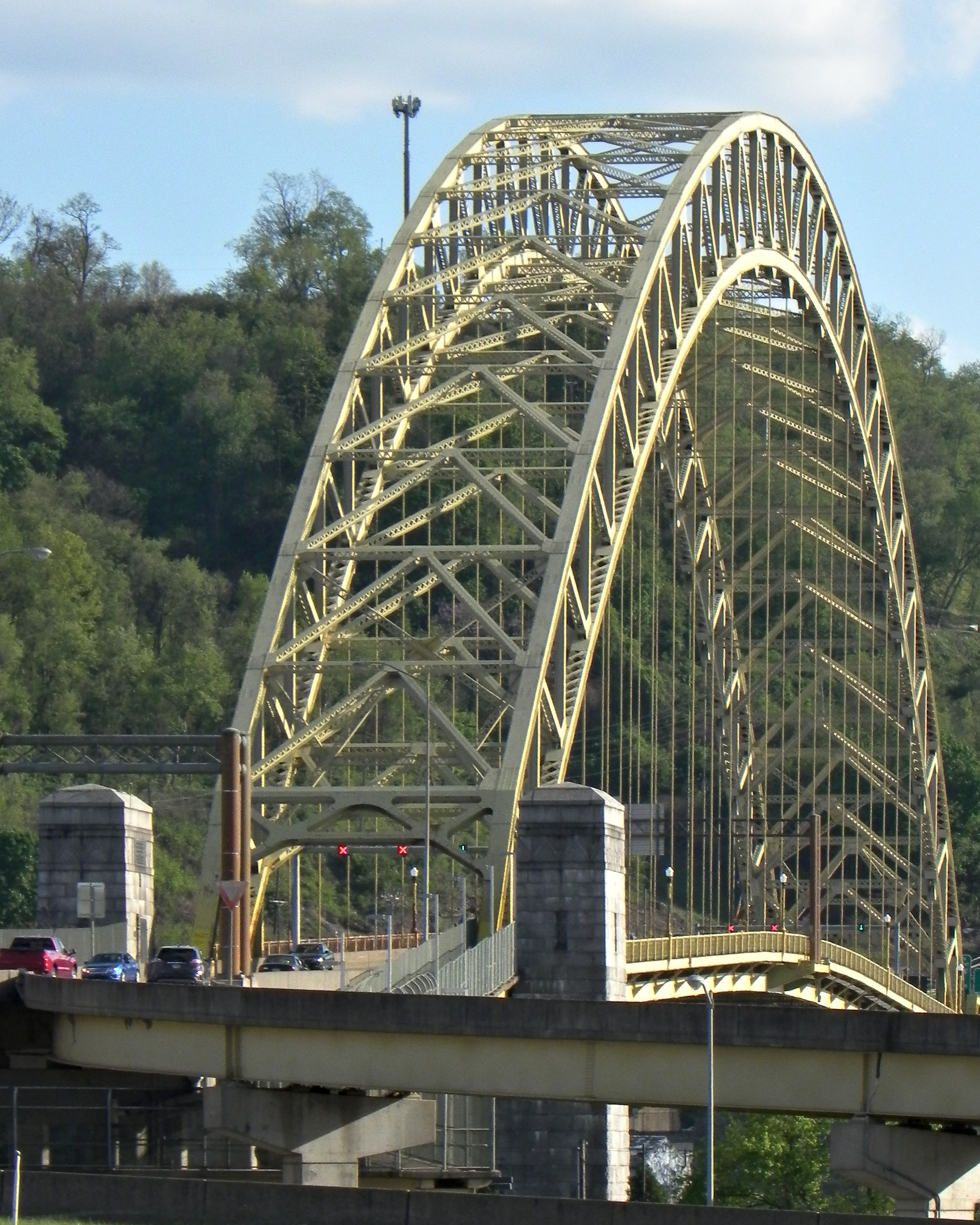
Long view

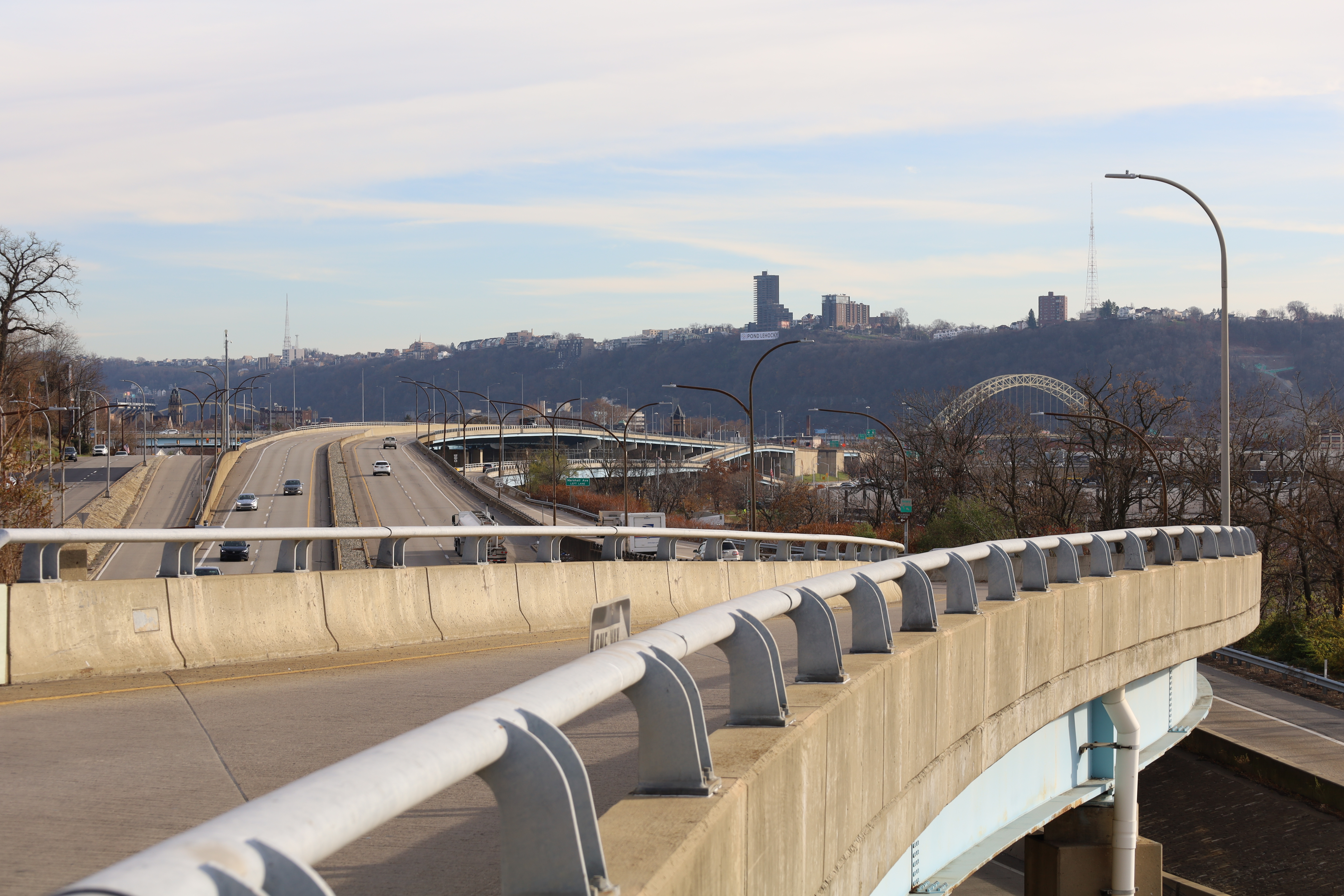
Highway approaching the bridge

== See also ==
- Bridges of Pittsburgh
- List of bridges documented by the Historic American Engineering Record in Pennsylvania
- List of crossings of the Ohio River
