= Continuous truss bridge =

Type of bridge

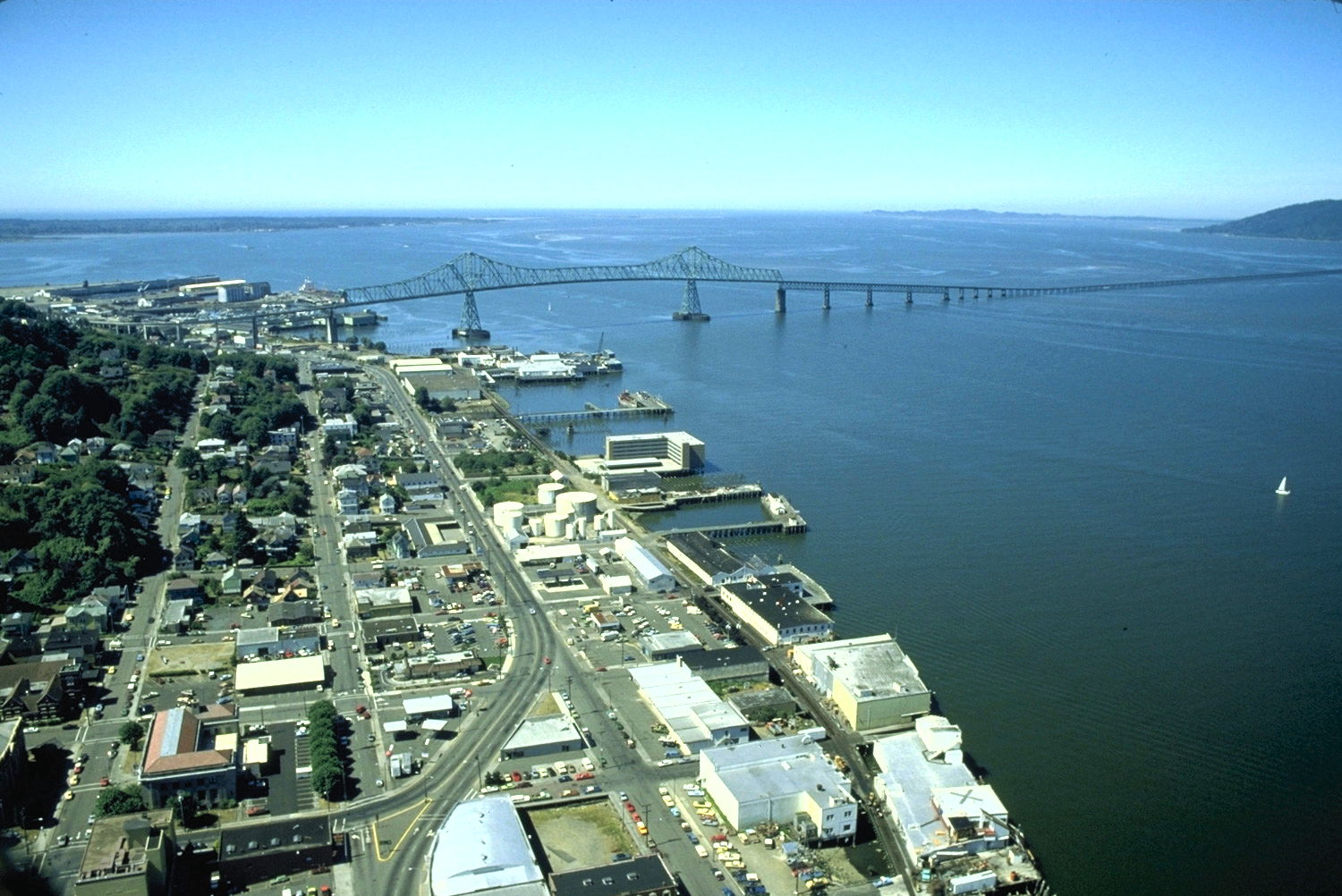
The Astoria–Megler Bridge is North America's longest continuous truss bridge.

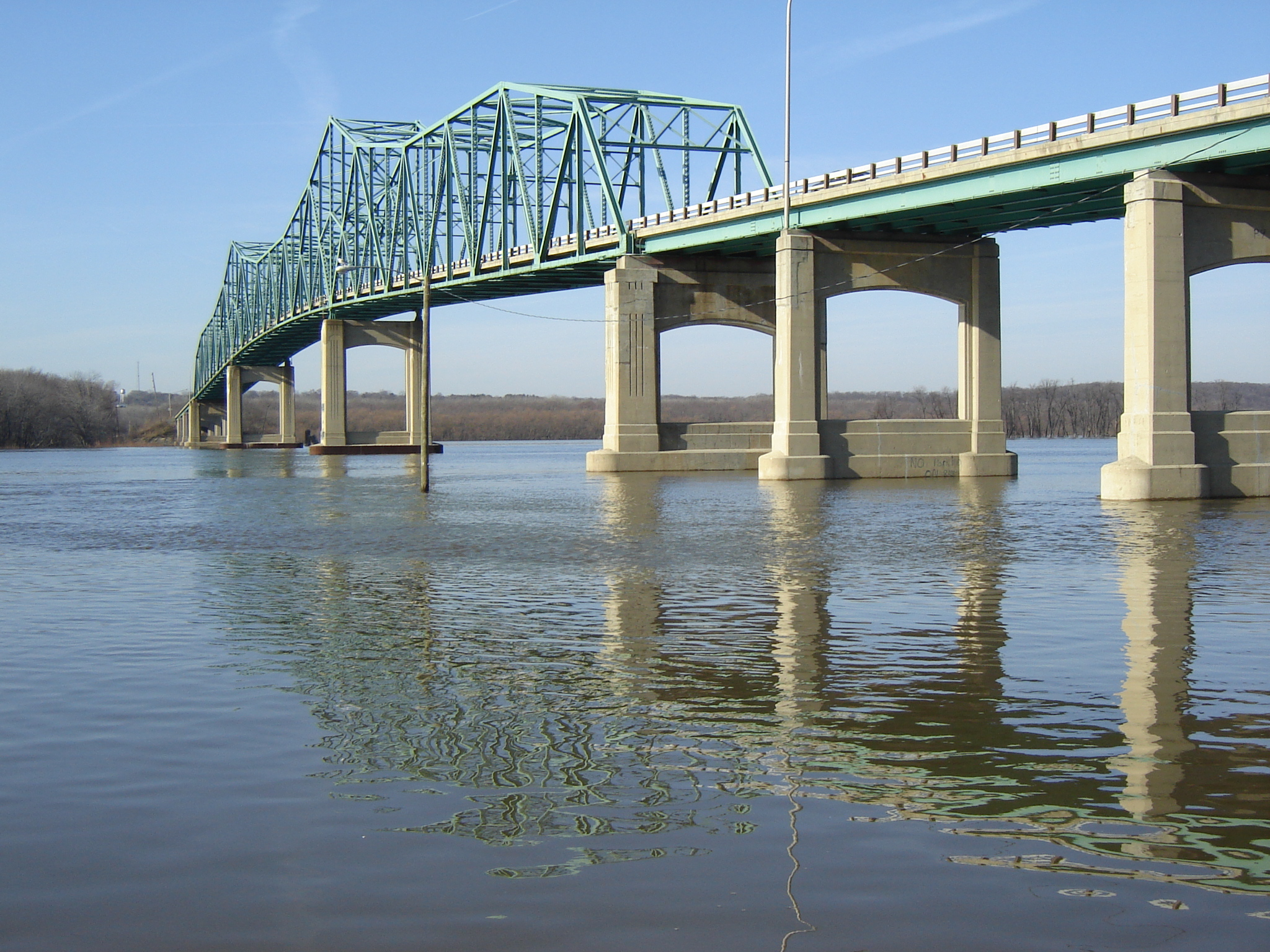
Smaller continuous truss bridge over the Illinois River at Lacon, Illinois

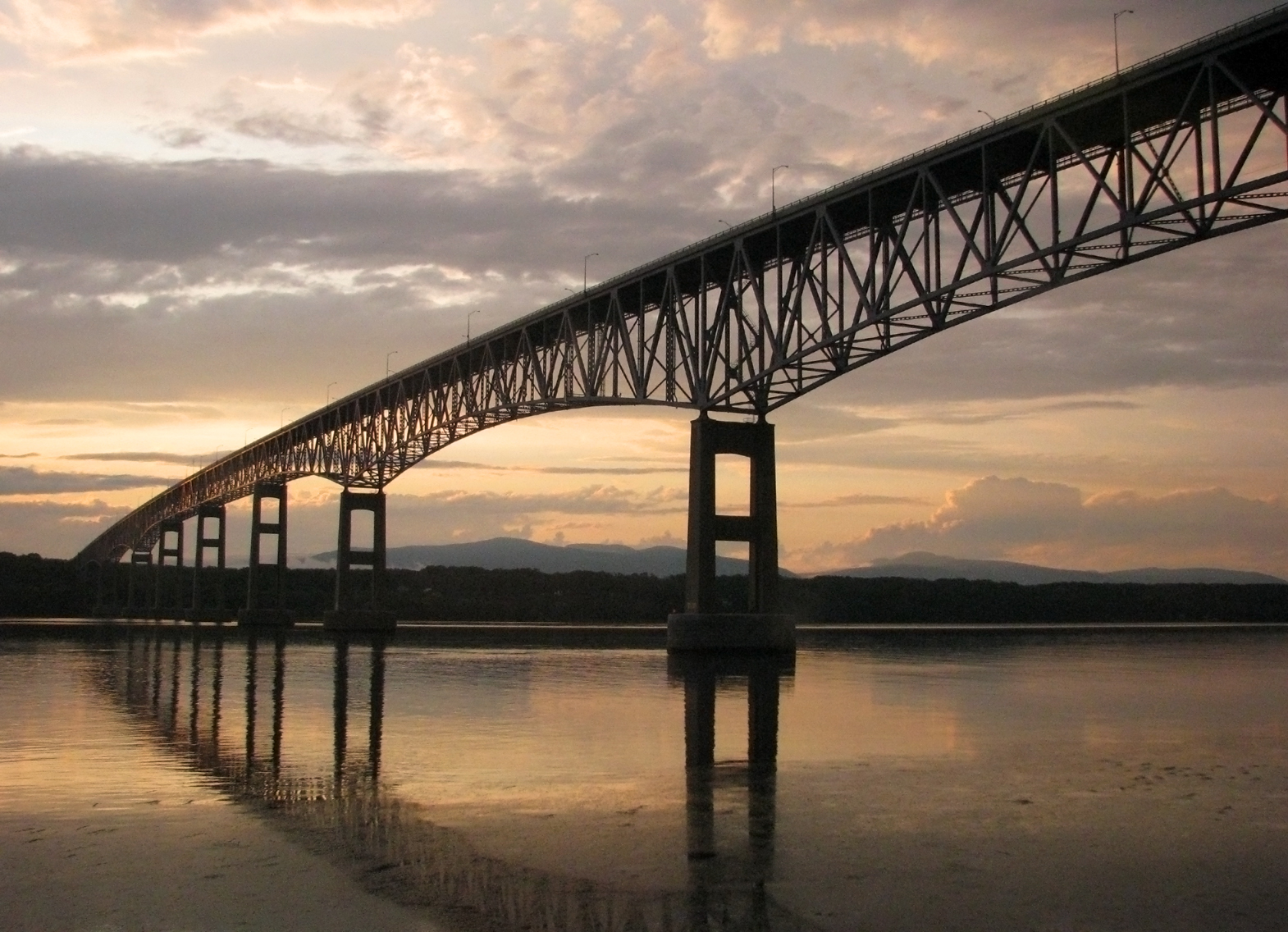
The Kingston-Rhinecliff Bridge

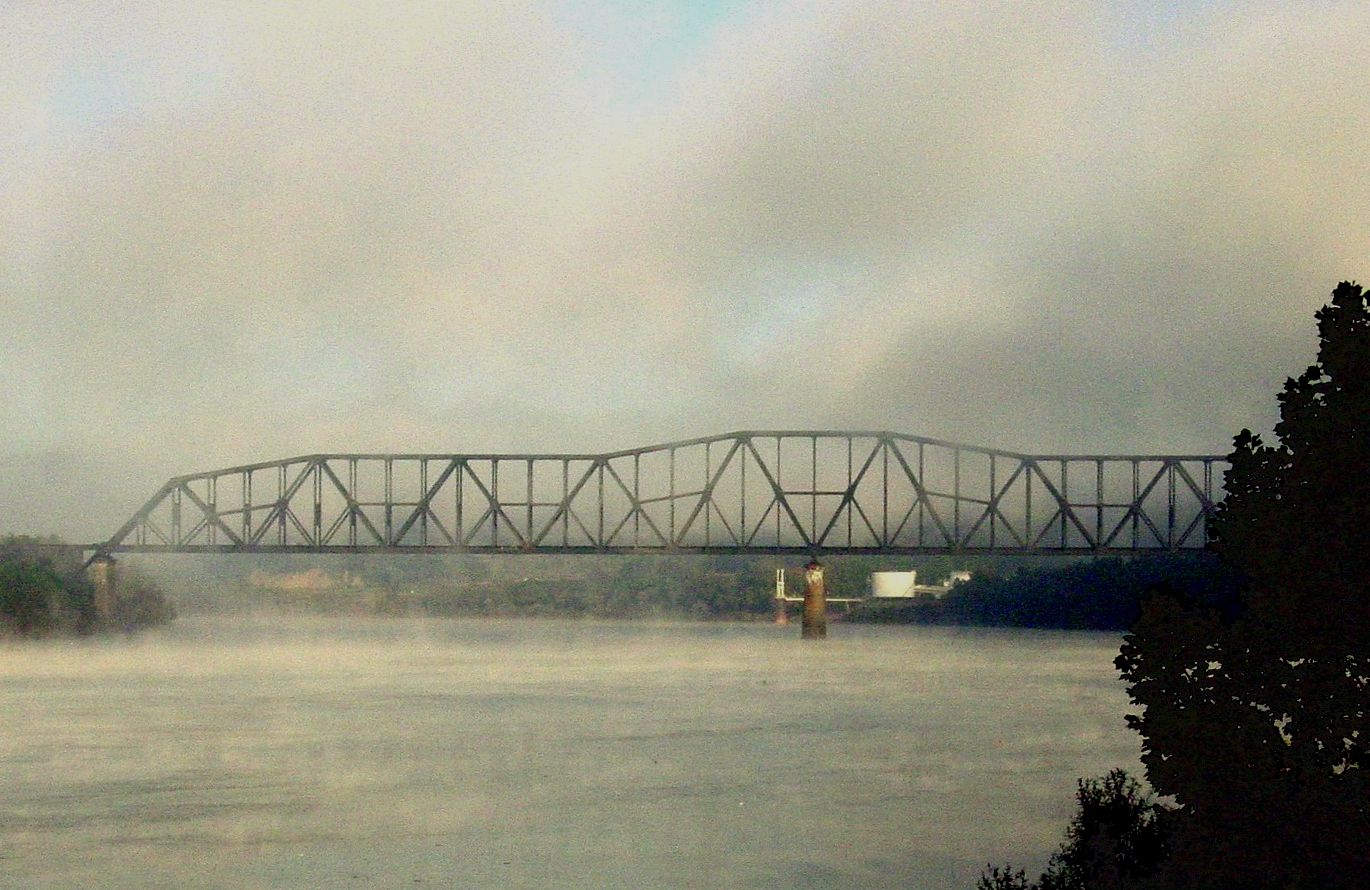
The Sciotoville Bridge (1916), the first continuous truss bridge in the United States.

A continuous truss bridge is a truss bridge that extends without hinges or joints across three or more supports. A continuous truss bridge may use less material than a series of simple trusses because a continuous truss distributes live loads across all the spans; in a series of simple trusses, each truss must be capable of supporting the entire load.

Although some continuous truss bridges resemble cantilever bridges and may be constructed using cantilever techniques, there are essential differences between the two forms. Cantilever bridges need not connect rigidly mid-span, as the cantilever arms are self-supporting. Although some cantilever bridges appear continuous due to decorative trusswork at the joints, these bridges will remain standing if the connections between the cantilevers are broken or the suspended span (if any) is removed. Conversely, continuous truss bridges rely on rigid truss connections throughout the structure for stability. Severing a continuous truss mid-span endangers the structure, as exemplified by the collapse of Baltimore's Francis Scott Key Bridge in March 2024. However, continuous truss bridges do not experience the tipping forces that a cantilever bridge must resist because the main span of a continuous truss bridge is supported at both ends.

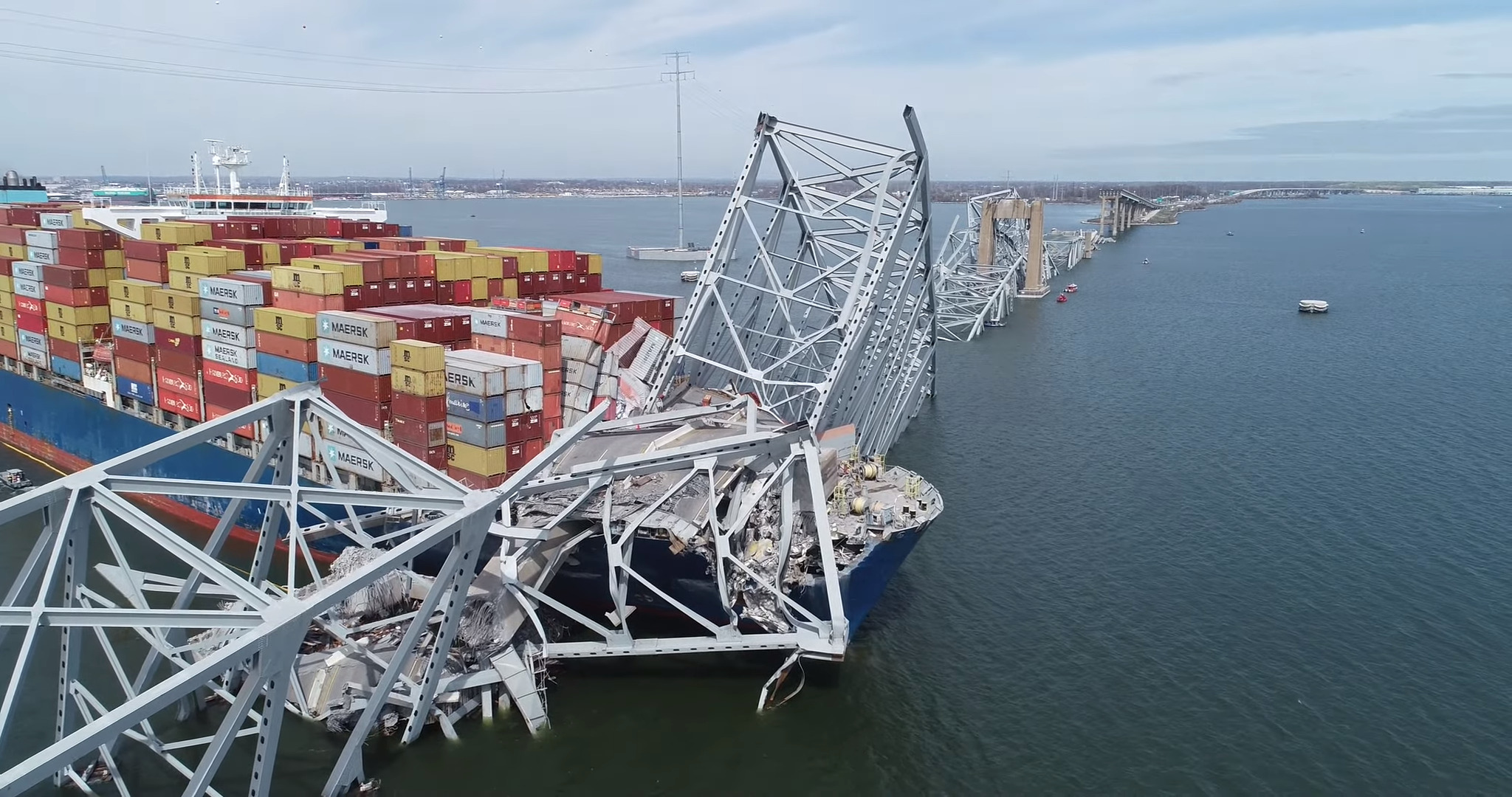
The result of collapse of a continuous truss bridge (the Francis Scott Key Bridge).

It is possible to convert a series of simple truss spans into a continuous truss. For example, the northern approach to the Golden Gate Bridge was initially constructed as a series of five simple truss spans. In 2001, a seismic retrofit project connected the five spans into a single continuous truss bridge.

== History ==
Continuous truss bridges started to be constructed in Europe during the second half of the 19th century. Although the advantages of continuous bridges were known, three main engineering challenges slowed their widespread adoption:

- Continuous trusses are statically indeterminate, which made it very laborious to calculate the stresses in the bridge before computers became available.
- The stresses in the truss can change significantly if one of the supports settles more than the others.
- The truss is susceptible to significant stresses due to temperature gradients in the structure, such as if the upper part of the truss is in the sun and the lower part is in the shade.

However, it was possible to avoid these issues to a certain extent through careful design. The early European bridges were usually lattice trusses with three to five spans. An example was the Boyne Viaduct, built in 1855 in Drogheda, Ireland. The first continuous truss bridge in North America was the Lachine Bridge in Montreal, built in 1888, followed by the Sciotoville Bridge in 1916 and the Bessemer & Lake Erie Railroad Bridge in 1918.

Since the development of computer-aided engineering, continuous truss bridges have become more common.

== Examples ==
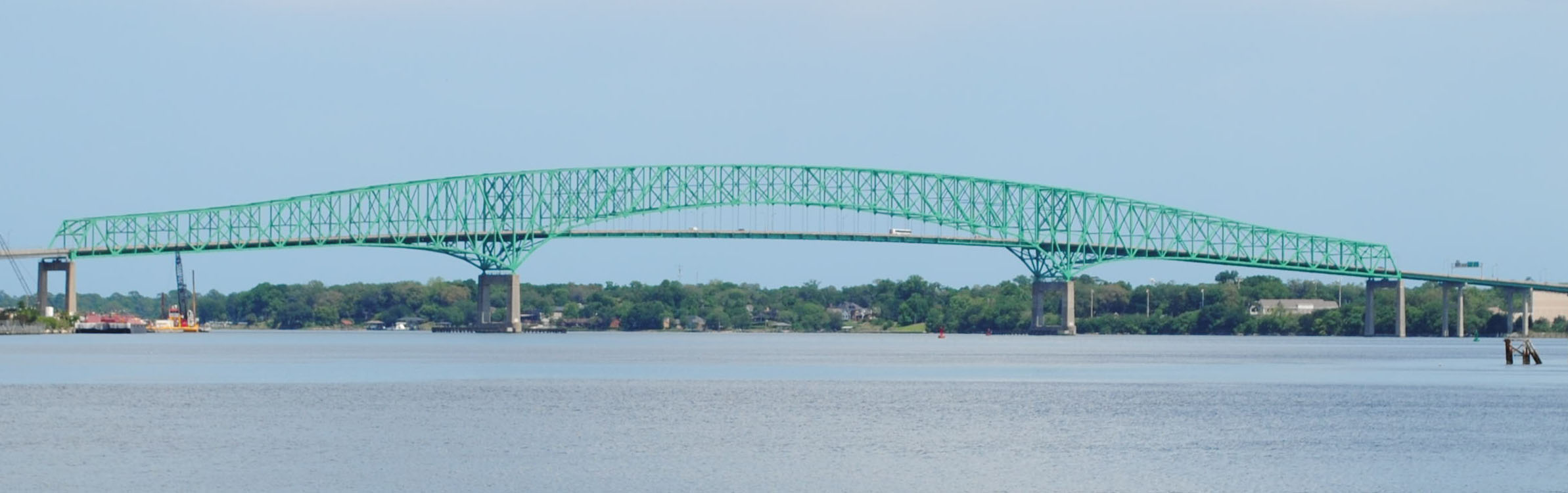
The Hart Bridge is a continuous, cantilevered truss bridge with an unusual design that includes a suspended road deck on the 332-metre (1,088 ft) main span and a through truss deck on the adjacent approach spans.

Some notable continuous truss bridges, with main span lengths. Most of those listed are in North America; for a more comprehensive worldwide list, see :

- Ikitsuki Bridge, 1,312 ft (400 m)
- Astoria–Megler Bridge, 1,232 ft (376 m)
- Francis Scott Key Bridge, 1,200 ft (370 m) (collapsed in 2024 following a bridge strike by a large container ship)
- Taylor-Southgate Bridge, 850 ft (260 m)
- Julien Dubuque Bridge, 845 ft (258 m)
- Charles M. Braga Jr. Memorial Bridge, 840 ft (260 m)
- Kingston–Rhinecliff Bridge, 800 ft (244 m), 7,793 feet (2357 m) (overall length, multiple spans)
- Governor Harry W. Nice Memorial Bridge, 800 ft (240 m) (replaced in 2022 and subsequently demolished)
- Don N. Holt Bridge, 800 ft (240 m)
- Sciotoville Bridge, 775 ft (236 m)
- Owensboro Bridge, 750 ft (230 m)
- Carroll Lee Cropper Bridge, 750 ft (230 m)
- Sewickley Bridge, 750 ft (230 m)
- Betsy Ross Bridge, 729 ft (222 m)
- Chesapeake Bay Bridge, 690 ft (210 m), secondary spans
- Cape Girardeau Bridge, 671 ft (205 m) (replaced in 2003 and subsequently demolished)
- Champlain Bridge, 450 ft (140 m) (replaced in 2009 subsequently demolished)

== See also ==
- List of longest continuous truss bridge spans
