= Pennsylvania Route 989 =

State highway in Beaver County, Pennsylvania, US

Pennsylvania Route 989

Route information
- Maintained by PennDOT
- Length: 15.10 mi (24.30 km)

Major junctions
- South end: PA 65 in Ambridge
- North end: PA 68 in New Sewickley Township

Location
- Country: United States
- State: Pennsylvania
- Counties: Beaver

Highway system
- Pennsylvania State Route System; Interstate; US; State; Scenic; Legislative
← PA 987	→ PA 990

Pennsylvania Route 989 (PA 989) is a 15.10-mile-long (24.30 km) state highway in southeastern Beaver County, Pennsylvania. The southern terminus is at PA 65 in Ambridge, and the northern terminus is at PA 68 in Unionville.

== Route description ==
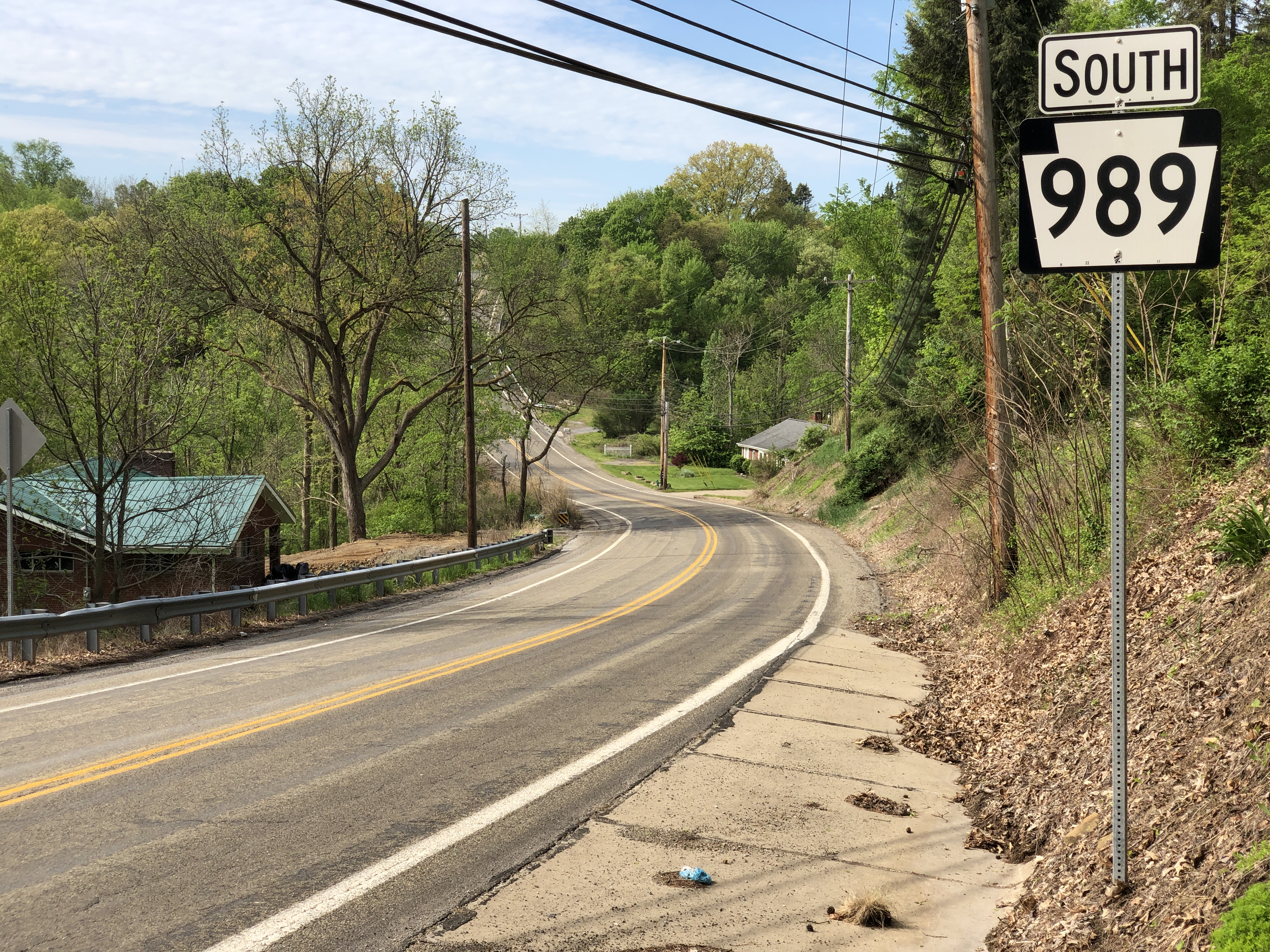
PA 989 southbound in Economy

PA 989 begins at an intersection with PA 65 in the borough of Ambridge, heading east on two-lane undivided 8th Street. The route passes through residential areas, turning north onto Duss Avenue. The road passes more homes before heading into a mix of residences and businesses with some industry. PA 989 splits from Duss Avenue by turning east onto 24th Street, running past more residences as it forms the border between Ambridge to the south and Harmony Township to the north. The route fully enters Harmony Township, becoming Breitenstein Road as it winds east through wooded areas with some residences. The road enters the borough of Economy and becomes Ridge Road Extension, curving to the north. PA 989 continues through forested areas of homes as it progresses north through Economy. Farther north, the road heads into a mix of farms and woods, where it makes a curve to the northeast. The route heads into rural residential areas, briefly turning northwest onto Conway Wallrose Road before heading north onto Dunlap Hill Road.

PA 989 passes near a couple housing developments before leaving Economy for New Sewickley Township and becoming an unnamed road. Here, the route continues north through a mix of farmland and woodland with a few residences. After passing through several miles of rural areas, PA 989 comes to a bridge over the Pennsylvania Turnpike (I-76) before the route turns northwest onto Glen Eden Road. Here, the road heads through areas of farms and homes, running a short distance to the north of the Pennsylvania Turnpike. PA 989 comes to its northern terminus at an intersection with PA 68 near the community of Unionville.

== Major intersections ==
The entire route is in Beaver County.

Location	mi	km	Destinations	Notes
Ambridge	0.00	0.00	PA 65 (Ohio River Boulevard) – Pittsburgh, New Brighton	Southern terminus
New Sewickley Township	15.10	24.30	PA 68 (Sunflower Road)	Northern terminus
1.000 mi = 1.609 km; 1.000 km = 0.621 mi
