= Sciotoville Bridge =

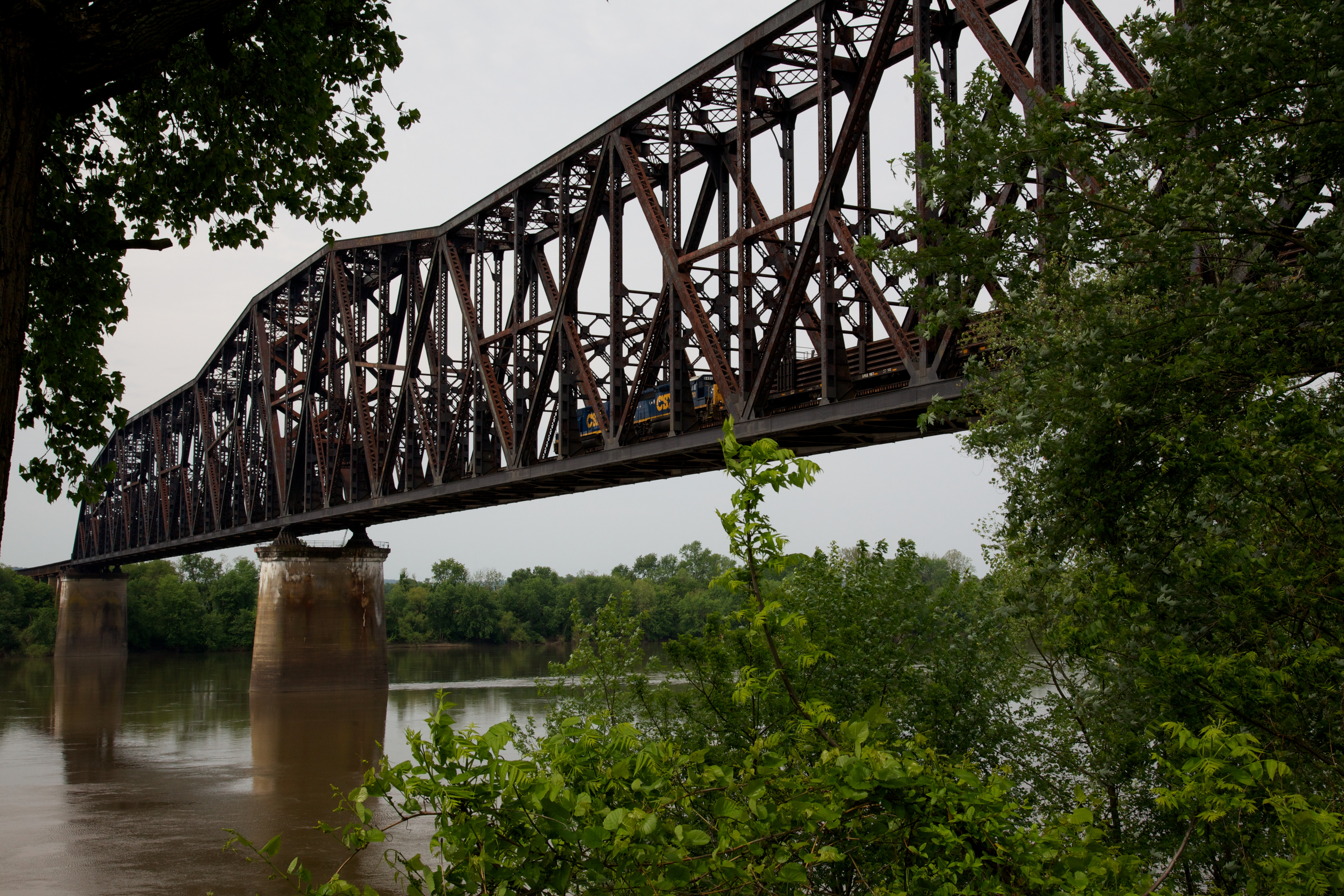
- The bridge in 2013
- Coordinates: 38.752878°N 82.885773°W
- Carries: Two tracks of CSX Transportation
- Crosses: Ohio River
- Locale: Siloam Junction, Kentucky and Sciotoville, Ohio, USA
- Maintained by: CSX Transportation

Characteristics
- Design: continuous truss bridge
- Total length: 1,550 feet (470 m)
- Longest span: 775 feet (236 m)

History
- Opened: 1916

Location
- Interactive map of Sciotoville Bridge

The Sciotoville Bridge is a steel continuous truss bridge carrying CSX Transportation railroad tracks across the Ohio River between Siloam - a junction located north of Limeville, Kentucky and east of South Shore, Kentucky - and Sciotoville, Ohio in the United States. Designed by Gustav Lindenthal, the bridge was constructed in 1916 by Chesapeake and Ohio Railway subsidiary Chesapeake and Ohio Northern Railway as part of a new route between Ashland, Kentucky and Columbus, Ohio.

The bridge is continuous across two 775-foot-long (236 m) spans, and is considered an engineering marvel. It held the record for longest continuous truss span in the world from its opening until 1945.

== See also ==
- List of crossings of the Ohio River
- List of longest continuous truss bridge spans
