= Jiujiang Yangtze River Bridge =

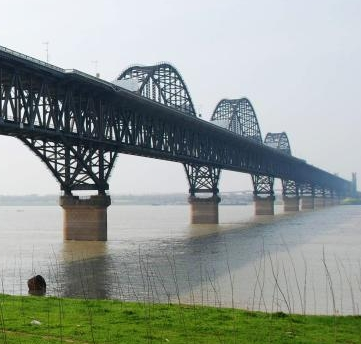
- Jiujiang Yangtze River Bridge
- Coordinates: 29.7502°N 116.0136°E
- Carries: China National Highway 105; Beijing–Kowloon railway
- Crosses: Yangtze River
- Locale: Jiujiang, Jiangxi / Huangmei County, Hubei

Characteristics
- Design: Combined truss-arch
- Longest span: 216 meters (709 ft)

History
- Construction start: 1973
- Construction end: 1991
- Opened: 1993

Location
- Interactive map of Jiujiang Yangtze River Bridge

The Jiujiang Yangtze River Bridge is a combined road-rail bridge over the Yangtze River near the city of Jiujiang, Jiangxi Province in eastern China. It links Xunyang District of Jiujiang, south of the river, with Xiaochi Town in Huangmei County, Hubei Province, to the north. The central section of the bridge uses a combined arch and truss structure and the bridge is one of the longest continuous truss bridges in the world, with a longest span of 216 meters (709 ft) and a total truss length of 1,314 meters (4,311 ft) =3x162+180+216+180+2x126. The double deck bridge carries four vehicular lanes and two sidewalks on the top deck and two railway tracks on the bottom deck.

== History ==
Construction of the Jiujiang Yangtze River Bridge began in 1973 but due to work stoppages, the bridge was not completed until 1993. The bridge was originally designed to carry trucks weighing up to 30 t (33 short tons). In 2008, the tonnage limit was raised to 55 t (61 short tons). In November 2011, a crack was discovered in the bridge's steel structure and forced the authorities to close the bridge to freight traffic. In February 2012, the tonnage limit was lowered to 20 t (22 short tons).

The Jiujiang Fuyin Expressway Bridge, a cable-stayed bridge 10 kilometres (6.2 mi) upstream, opened in 2013.

== See also ==
- Yangtze River bridges and tunnels
