= Ikitsuki Bridge =

Bridge connecting Ikitsuki to Hirado, Japan

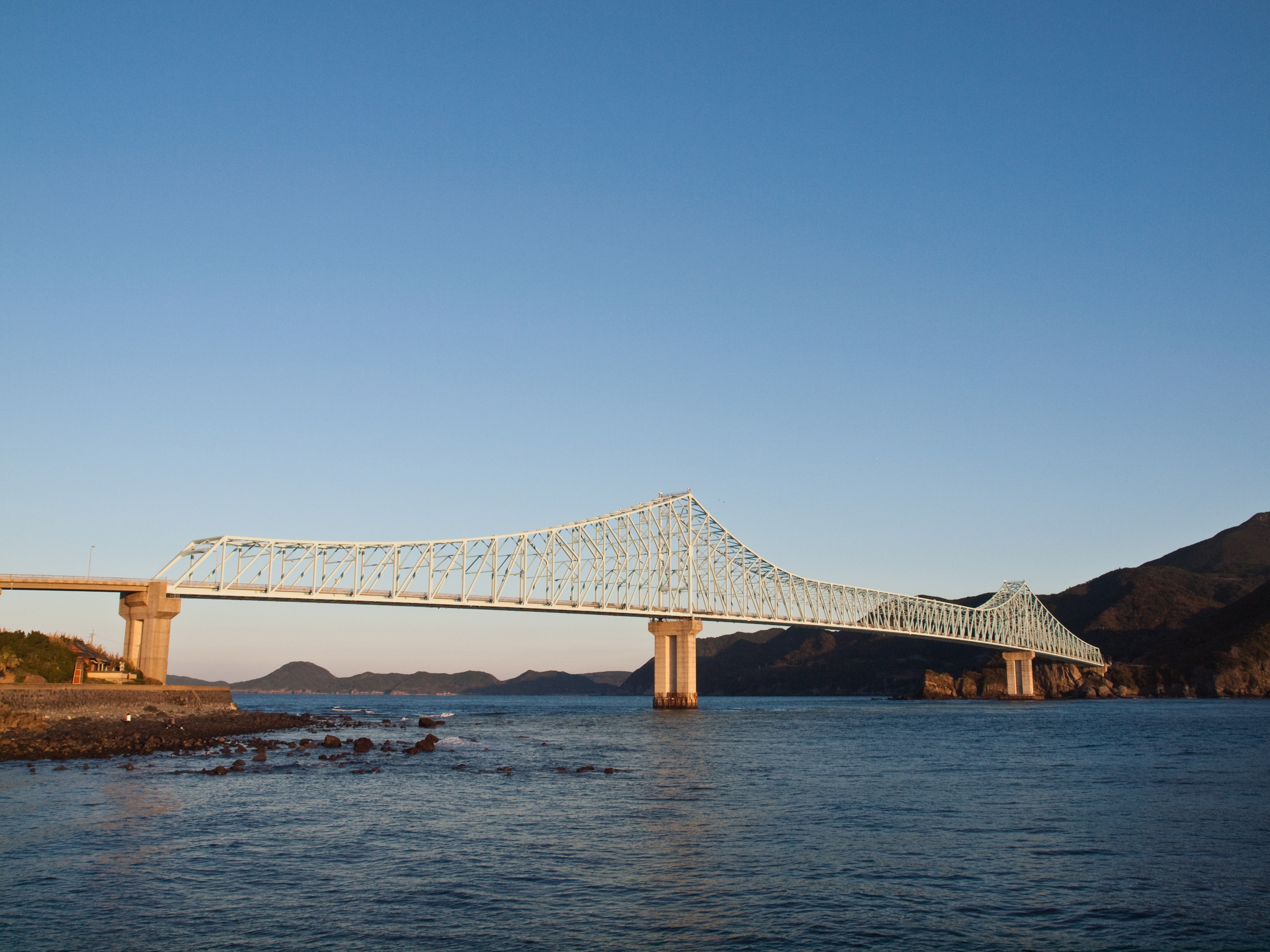
- Coordinates: 33.3531°N 129.4380°E
- Locale: Ikitsuki, Nagasaki
- Official name: Ikutsuki Bridge

Characteristics
- Design: Continuous truss bridge
- Material: Steel
- Width: 6.5 metres
- Height: 18 metres
- Longest span: 400 metres (1,312.336 ft)

History
- Construction start: 1983
- Construction end: 1991

Location
- Interactive map of Ikitsuki Bridge

The Ikitsuki Bridge is a continuous truss bridge that connects Ikitsuki to Hirado Island. Completed in 1991, it has a main span of 400 meters (1,300 feet). It is the longest continuous truss bridge in the world.

== History ==
The bridge allows automobile access from Ikitsuki to Hirado and the rest of Japan.

In 2009, a crack which seriously damaged the safety of the bridge was found in a diagonal member near an intermediate pier during an inspection for determining points to be annually inspected. The crack grew to be 20 cm long, and was thought to be caused by wind-induced vibrations.

== See also ==
- List of longest continuous truss bridge spans
- Truss bridge
