= Taylor–Southgate Bridge =

Taylor-Southgate Bridge
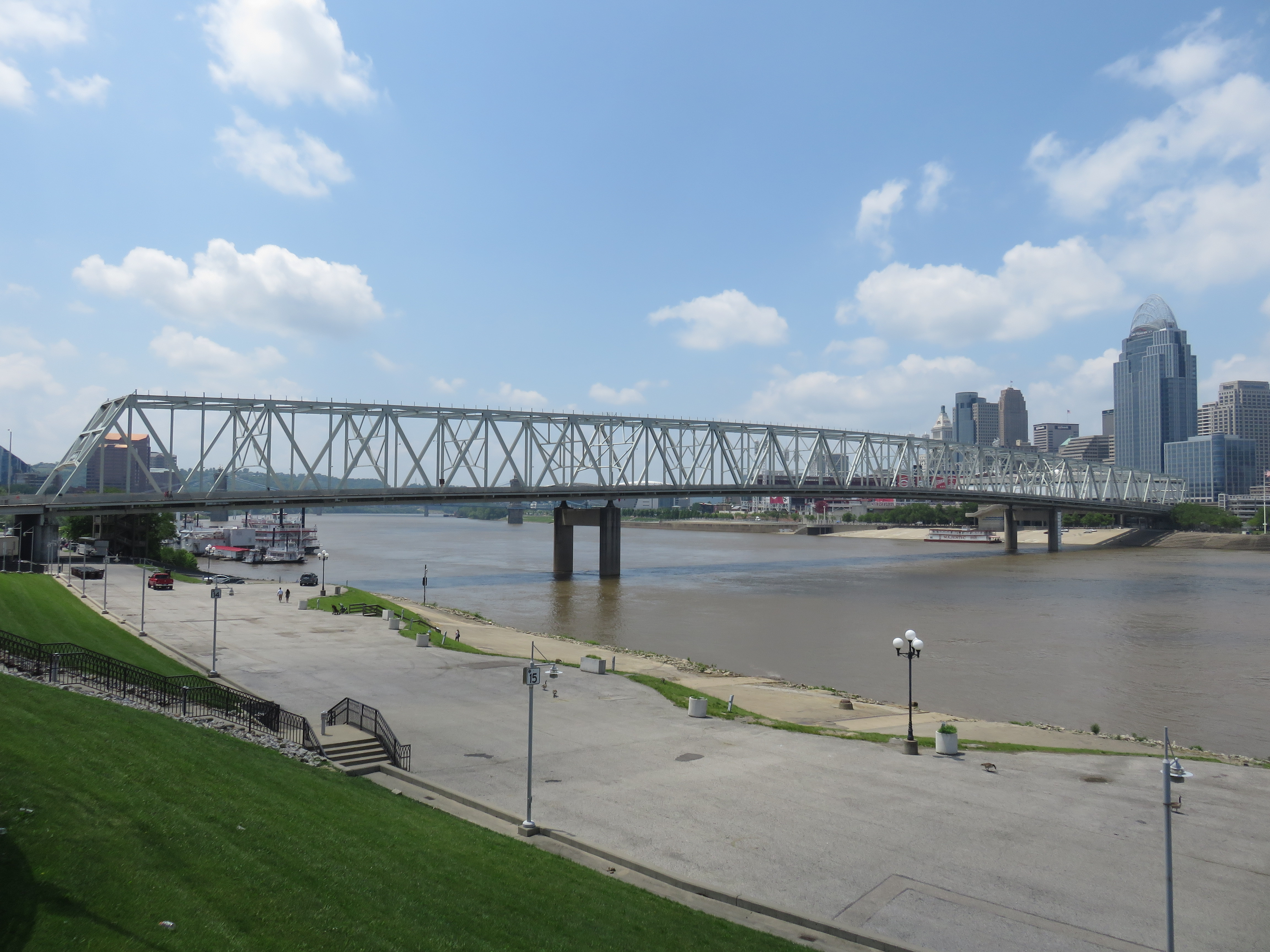
- Coordinates: 39.09600°N 84.50120°W
- Carries: 4 lanes of US 27; 2 pedestrian sidewalks
- Crosses: Ohio River
- Locale: Newport, Kentucky and Cincinnati, Ohio
- Maintained by: Kentucky Transportation Cabinet

Characteristics
- Design: Continuous truss bridge
- Longest span: 259 meters (850 feet)

History
- Construction cost: $56 million
- Opened: 1995

The Taylor–Southgate Bridge is a continuous truss bridge that was built in 1995. It has a main span of 850 feet (260 m), and a total span of 1,850 feet (560 m). The bridge carries U.S. Route 27 across the Ohio River, connecting Newport, Kentucky and Cincinnati, Ohio.

Some regard this bridge, which was a replacement for the structurally deficient and functionally obsolete Cincinnati-Newport Bridge built by Samuel Bigstaff, as a little too plain in its design for a major urban bridge, especially considering many cities today are opting for a more elegant design, such as a cable stayed bridge.

The bridge is named for the families of James Taylor, Jr. and Richard Southgate, two important early settlers of Newport. Richard was the father of William Wright Southgate, a pre Civil War Congressman from northern Kentucky.

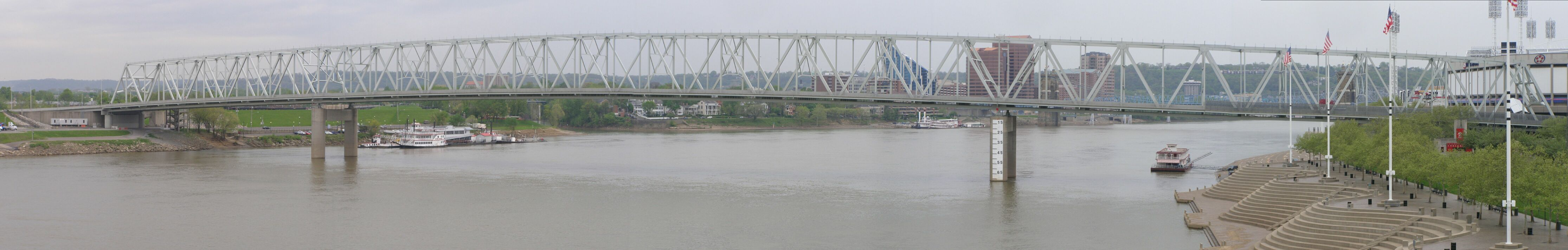
Taylor-Southgate Bridge

The bridge replaced the Cincinnati-Newport Bridge, a truss bridge built in 1890. Commonly known as Central Bridge, it was demolished in 1992.

== See also ==
- List of crossings of the Ohio River
