= Sewickley, Pennsylvania =

Borough in Pennsylvania, United States

- Borough
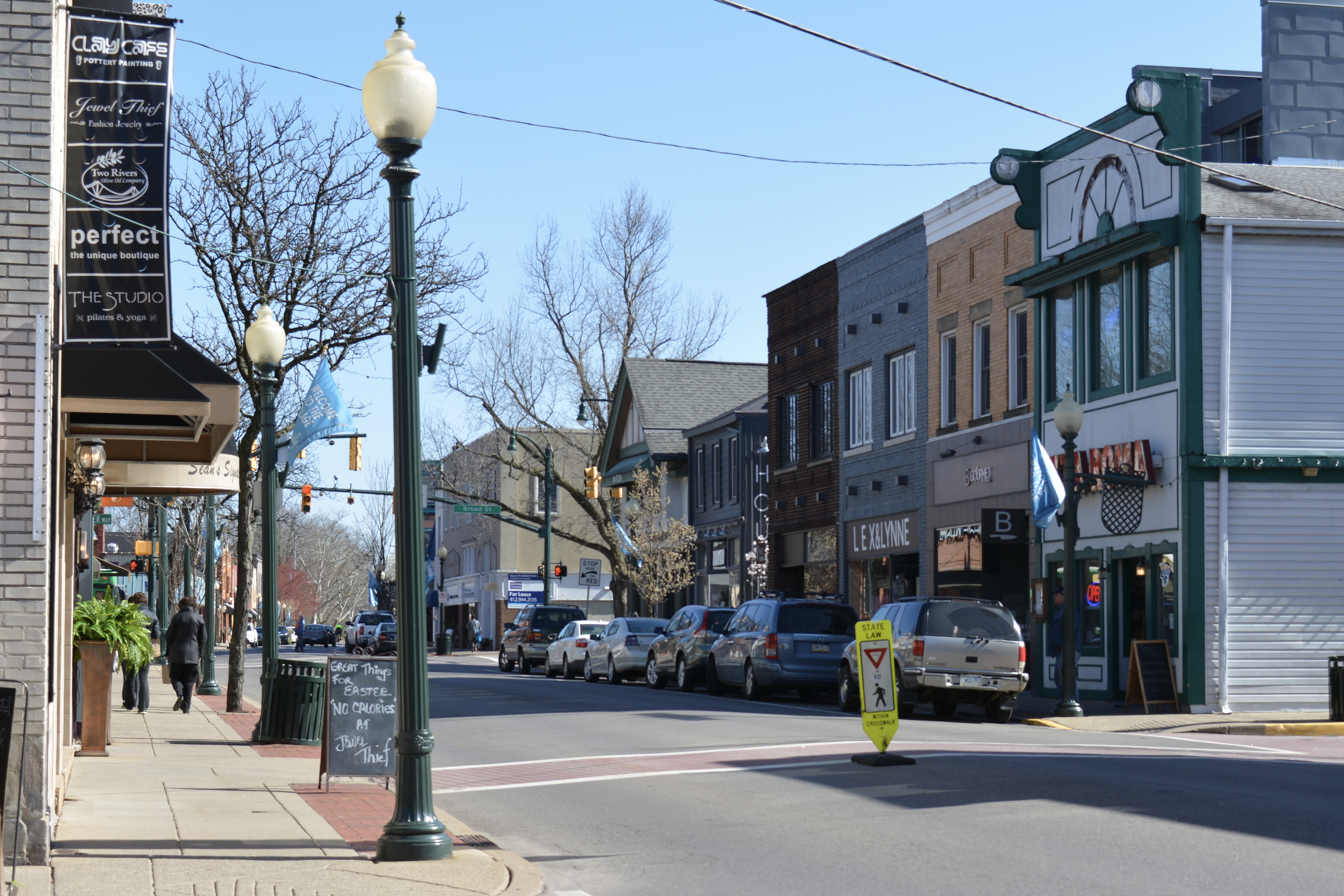
- Sewickley in March 2016

- Flag

- Location in Allegheny County, Pennsylvania
- Coordinates: 40°32′11″N 80°11′04″W
- Country: United States
- State: Pennsylvania
- County: Allegheny

Government
  - Type: Mayor–council
  - Mayor: George Shannon
  - Manager: Donna Kaib

Area
  - Total: 1.12 sq mi (2.90 km^{2})
  - Land: 1.00 sq mi (2.59 km^{2})
  - Water: 0.12 sq mi (0.31 km^{2})
- Elevation: 741 ft (226 m)

Population (2020)
  - Total: 3,907
  - Density: 3,793.3/sq mi (1,464.62/km^{2})
- Time zone: UTC−5 (Eastern (EST))
  - Summer (DST): UTC−4 (EDT)
- ZIP codes: 15143
- Area code: 412
- FIPS code: 42-69376
- GNIS feature ID: 1187277
- Website: www.sewickleyborough.org

Sewickley is a borough in Allegheny County, Pennsylvania, United States. Located along the Ohio River 12 miles (19 km) northwest of Pittsburgh, it is a residential suburb in the Pittsburgh metropolitan area. The population was 3,907 at the 2020 census. The Sewickley Bridge crosses the Ohio River from Sewickley to Moon Township.

== Etymology ==
Historian Charles A. Hanna suggested "Sewickley" came from Creek words for "raccoon" (sawi) and "town" (ukli). According to Hanna, the Asswikale branch of the Shawnee probably borrowed their name from the neighboring Sawokli Muscogee before the former's migration from present-day South Carolina to Pennsylvania. Contemporary accounts from noted anthropologist Frederick Webb Hodge and the Sewickley Presbyterian Church, as well as the current Sewickley Valley Historical Society concur to varying degrees with Hanna's etymology. Some locals alternatively consider Sewickley to be a Native American word meaning "sweet water."

== History ==
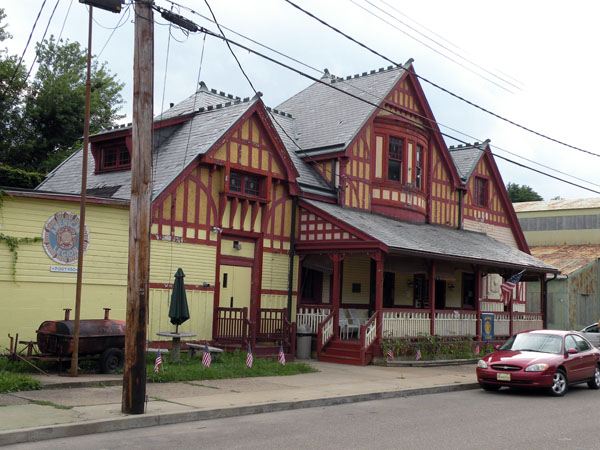
Old Sewickley Train Station (1887)

The valley surrounding the Big Sewickley Creek was surveyed in 1785 and sold to American Revolutionary War veterans. After the Battle of Fallen Timbers in 1794, settlers began to trickle in to the area, with flatboats, keelboats, and steamboats forming an industry along the Ohio River.

In 1837, the Edgeworth Female Seminary was moved from Pittsburgh to what was then called Sewickley Bottom. The following year, Sewickley Academy was founded. Becoming a small center for education, by 1840 the community was formally established as Sewickleyville. The borough was incorporated as simply Sewickley on July 6, 1853, after growth continued as the Pittsburgh, Fort Wayne and Chicago Railway was built through the area.

In 1911, the Sewickley Bridge was completed, bringing an end to the ferry industry. Ohio River Boulevard, later designated a part of Pennsylvania Route 65, was completed in 1934.

== Geography ==
Sewickley is located at 40°32.25′N 80°10.5′W (40.5390, −80.1807). According to the U.S. Census Bureau, the borough has a total area of 1.1 square miles (2.8 km^{2}), of which 1.0 square mile (2.6 km^{2}) is land and 0.1 square miles (0.26 km^{2}) (11.11%) is water.

=== Surrounding and adjacent neighborhoods ===
Sewickley has four land borders with Edgeworth to the northwest, Glen Osborne to the southeast, Sewickley Heights to the northeast, and Aleppo Township to the east. Across the Ohio River, Sewickley runs adjacent with Moon Township and Coraopolis with the Sewickley Bridge as the direct link to the former.

Along with the four land borders, plus Bell Acres, Glenfield, Haysville, Leetsdale, Leet Township, and Sewickley Hills, Sewickley is located in the Quaker Valley School District. Together, these boroughs and townships constitute a loosely defined region in northwestern Allegheny County. Most of these municipalities – not including Leetsdale and parts of Leet Township – share the Sewickley post office and its 15143 zip code.

== Demographics ==
Historical population
Census	Pop.	Note	%±
1860	795		—
1870	1,472		85.2%
1880	2,053		39.5%
1890	2,776		35.2%
1900	3,563		28.4%
1910	4,479		25.7%
1920	4,955		10.6%
1930	5,599		13.0%
1940	5,614		0.3%
1950	5,836		4.0%
1960	6,157		5.5%
1970	5,660		−8.1%
1980	4,778		−15.6%
1990	4,134		−13.5%
2000	3,902		−5.6%
2010	3,827		−1.9%
2020	3,907		2.1%

The population of Sewickley peaked in the 1960 census, with over 6,000 residents.

=== 2020 census ===
As of the 2020 census, Sewickley had a population of 3,907. The median age was 42.3 years. 21.9% of residents were under the age of 18 and 20.7% of residents were 65 years of age or older. For every 100 females there were 83.9 males, and for every 100 females age 18 and over there were 81.8 males age 18 and over.

99.5% of residents lived in urban areas, while 0.5% lived in rural areas.

There were 1,776 households in Sewickley, of which 25.1% had children under the age of 18 living in them. Of all households, 42.9% were married-couple households, 18.2% were households with a male householder and no spouse or partner present, and 34.8% were households with a female householder and no spouse or partner present. About 40.6% of all households were made up of individuals and 16.5% had someone living alone who was 65 years of age or older.

There were 2,008 housing units, of which 11.6% were vacant. The homeowner vacancy rate was 4.0% and the rental vacancy rate was 5.9%.

Racial composition as of the 2020 census
Race	Number	Percent
White	3,328	85.2%
Black or African American	202	5.2%
American Indian and Alaska Native	6	0.2%
Asian	71	1.8%
Native Hawaiian and Other Pacific Islander	4	0.1%
Some other race	45	1.2%
Two or more races	251	6.4%
Hispanic or Latino (of any race)	128	3.3%

=== 2010 census ===
As of the 2010 census, there were 3,827 people with 1,765 households and 950 families residing in the borough's 1,965 housing units. The racial makeup of the borough was 88.8% White, 7.3% African American, with the remainder of other races or multi-racial. No other single race represented more than 2% of the population. Hispanics represented less than 2% of the population.

=== Income and poverty ===
According to the 2011–15 American Community Survey, the median household income in the borough was about $91,735 and the median family income was $118,507. The per capita income for the borough was about $54,149.

== Government and politics ==
Presidential election results
Year	Republican	Democratic	Third parties
2020	38% (938)	60% (1,514)	2% (54)
2016	40% (819)	58% (1,192)	2% (27)
2012	51% (1,081)	48% (1,004)	1% (21)

Sewickley is divided into wards and is governed by a mayor and a nine-member borough council composed of three members from each ward. Members are elected to four-year terms. The current mayor of Sewickley is George Shannon. The current members of council are Cynthia Mullins (President), Julie Barnes (Vice President), Thomas Rostek (President pro tempore), Bridgett Bates, Brian Bozzo, Todd Hamer, Donna Korczyk, Todd Renner, and Anne Willoughby.

== Education ==
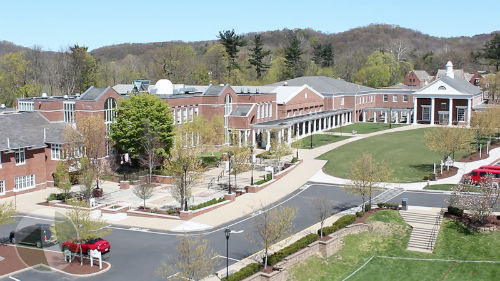
Campus of Sewickley Academy

There are several private schools in the area, including Sewickley Academy, St. James Catholic School, Eden Christian Academy, and Montessori Children's Community. The public school system, Quaker Valley School District, is renowned for an innovative laptop-technology grant received in 2000 from former Pennsylvania governor Tom Ridge. Quaker Valley School District is often regarded as one of the best and academically top-ranked school districts in the nation. In the spring of 2006, U.S. News & World Report ranked Quaker Valley High School among the top 2% of high schools nationwide. The Sewickley Public Library of the Quaker Valley School District is a Library Journal Star Library for the third year in a row and is continuously one of the top 25 largest libraries in the Pittsburgh Business Times Book of Lists.

== Health care ==
Sewickley is home to Sewickley Valley Hospital, which is part of the Heritage Valley Health System. Heritage Valley Sewickley provides comprehensive health care for residents of Allegheny, Beaver, Butler and Lawrence counties in Pennsylvania; eastern Ohio and the panhandle of West Virginia.

Heritage Valley offers medical, surgical and diagnostic services at its hospitals, community satellite facilities and in physician offices. Heritage Valley Health System's affiliated physician groups include Heritage Valley Medical Group, Tri-State Obstetrics and Gynecology and Heritage Valley Pediatrics.

== Sewickley Cemetery ==
In 1860 Sewickley Cemetery was opened. The cemetery is now the resting place of more than 12,000 people. There are also two war memorials located on the burial grounds.

=== Civil War Memorial ===
There is a monument celebrating the local Civil War veterans - it is 20 feet tall and was installed in 2005. There was an 1866 statue which depicted a soldier on bended knee; but that statue was damaged from many years of weather.

=== Tuskegee Airmen Memorial ===
The Tuskegee Airmen have been memorialized in the cemetery with two large black granite blocks. the blocks are inscribed with the names of Western Pennsylvania veterans. Another block shows a depiction of two planes engaged in aerial combat.

== Notable people ==
- Tom Barrasso, former Pittsburgh Penguins goalie
- Robert Carothers, tenth president of the University of Rhode Island
- Michael Cerveris, actor and musician
- Caitlin Clarke, Broadway and film star
- Dan Cortese, actor and former MTV VJ
- Sidney Crosby, Pittsburgh Penguins player
- Hilary Edson, actress
- William Fitzsimmons, musician
- Sergei Gonchar, Pittsburgh Penguins assistant coach and former player
- Christa Harmotto, Olympic volleyball player
- Franco Harris, retired Pittsburgh Steelers player
- Shawn Holman, former pitcher for the Detroit Tigers
- Chuck Knox, former NFL head coach
- Ray Krawczyk, professional baseball player
- Mario Lemieux, former Pittsburgh Penguins player
- Evgeni Malkin, Pittsburgh Penguins player
- Wentworth Miller, actor, graduated from Quaker Valley High School
- Charles I. Murray, Brigadier General, USMC; recipient of Navy Cross and Army Distinguished Service Cross
- Chuck Noll, longtime NFL head coach
- Rissi Palmer, country music artist
- Jane H. Rider, engineer and bacteriologist
- Joe Rock, professional baseball player for the Tampa Bay Rays
- Keith Rothfus, former U.S. Representative for Pennsylvania's 12th district
- Bianca Smith, professional baseball coach
- George R. Stewart, author
- Kathleen Tessaro, novelist
- Mike Tomczak, former Pittsburgh Steelers quarterback
- Ken Whitlock, pro football player, first black player for the Toronto Argonauts

== In popular culture ==
In 1995, the movie Roommates was filmed in and around Pittsburgh, Pennsylvania including Sewickley.

Also in 1995, parts of the movie Houseguest were filmed on Sewickley's main streets, Broad Street and Beaver Street. The Bruegger's Bagels on Beaver Street was temporarily transformed into an operating McDonald's during shooting of Houseguest.

In 2002, parts of The Mothman Prophecies were filmed in the Sewickley area.

Scenes from the Netflix show Sweet Magnolias were filmed at the intersection of Broad Street and Beaver Street.

Scenes from Jack Reacher and The Lifeguard were filmed near the Sewickley Manor apartments and condominiums.

Foxcatcher was filmed in the Sewickley area in October 2012.

The fictional 1:24-scale town of Elgin Park, by artist and photographer Michael Paul Smith, was loosely based on Sewickley.

Sid Lang, a primary character in Wallace Stegner's 1987 novel Crossing to Safety, grew up in Sewickley.

== See also ==
- List of cities and towns along the Ohio River
