= Sewickley Bridge =

Bridge over the Ohio River

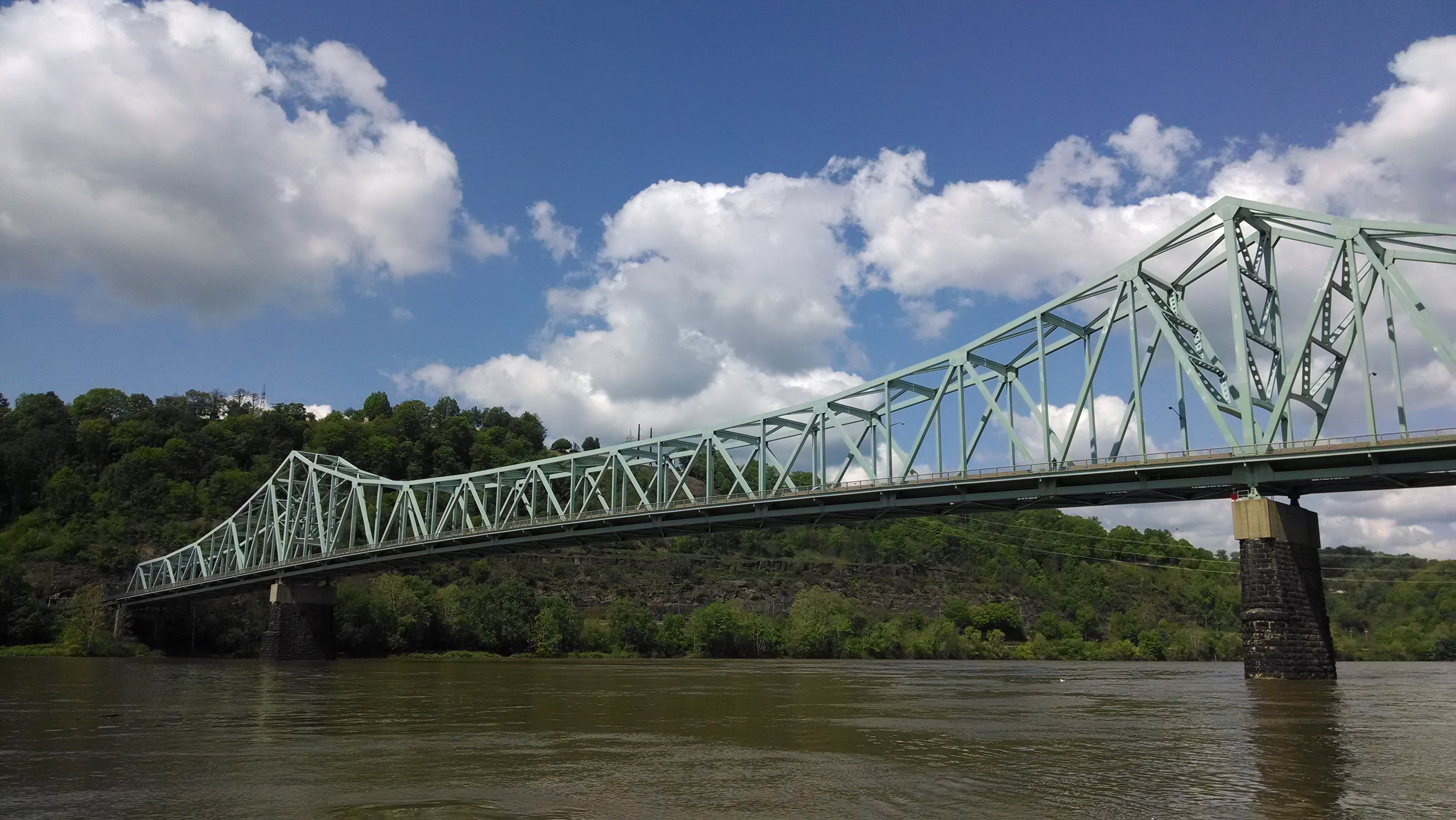
- Sewickley Bridge from upstream.
- Coordinates: 40°31′59″N 80°11′16″W
- Carries: 2 lanes of the Orange Belt; 1 pedestrian walkway
- Crosses: Ohio River
- Locale: Sewickley, Pennsylvania

Characteristics
- Design: continuous truss bridge
- Total length: 1,500 feet (460 m)
- Longest span: 750 feet (230 m)
- Clearance below: 73 feet (22 m)

History
- Opened: October 21, 1981

The Sewickley Bridge is a steel continuous truss bridge spanning the Ohio River between Sewickley and Moon Township, Pennsylvania, carrying State Route 4025 and the Orange Belt. It was built by American Bridge Company and opened on October 21, 1981.

== History and architectural features ==
The current bridge is the second bridge to occupy the site; the original Sewickley Bridge opened on September 19, 1911, after twenty-six months of construction.

Using lattice-beam cantilever truss design, the bridge was built by the Fort Pitt Bridge Works, and was officially named the Ohio River Bridge No. 1.

The current bridge's center span is 750 feet (230 m) long; the side spans are each 375 feet (114 m) long. The bridge deck contains two vehicle lanes and a pedestrian sidewalk. It crosses 73 feet (22 m) above the river. It is owned by the Pennsylvania Department of Transportation.

By the late 1970s, the bridge had deteriorated badly. The bridge was closed for emergency repairs from January 30 to May 20, 1977, and also from January 11 to March 2, 1979. A replacement bridge was ordered; the design was completed in late 1979.

The old Sewickley Bridge closed again on May 14, 1980, and was demolished in July of that year.

To reduce construction costs, the piers from the original bridge were reused for the new bridge. This meant that the old bridge had to be completely demolished before the new bridge could be built. The central 350-foot (110 m) suspended span was lowered onto barges and floated away, while the rest of the bridge was dismantled piece by piece to maintain balance of the cantilever arms. The crossing was closed for a total of seventeen months before the new bridge opened.

The new bridge mimicked the old bridge's shape and scale, although it used box members instead of lattice beams and was of a continuous truss design instead of a cantilever-and-suspended-span design.

The original bridge was capped by four decorative finial spires; these were saved and put on public display. One sits in a park in downtown Sewickley, along with the keystone-shaped builder's plaque from the original bridge. Another is near the old Sewickley train station between Route 65 and the river, near the north end of the current bridge; the third spire is at Station Square in Pittsburgh. The fourth is on display across the river in Coraopolis.

The location of the bridge is 40°31′59″N 80°11′16″W (40.5331234°, -80.1878365°), at an elevation of 692 feet (211 m).

== Impact of bridge closures ==
During the 1970s and 1980s, the length and frequency of the bridge's closures caused economic hardship for multiple businesses in Coraopolis, Edgeworth, Moon Township, and Sewickley. Hegner's Hardware Store reported a revenue loss of twelve to fifteen percent in 1977 while the owner of one Burger King Restaurant in Edgeworth reported a loss of twenty-five percent, or roughly $10,000 per month, that same year. In addition, the health and lives of residents who were experiencing acute bleeding or coronary emergencies and in need of rapid medical treatment at the Sewickley Valley Hospital were put at higher risk due to longer travel times for emergency vehicles.

The bridge closures also significantly lengthened travel time to and from the Greater Pittsburgh International Airport for area residents and visitors.

== See also ==
- List of bridges documented by the Historic American Engineering Record in Pennsylvania
- List of crossings of the Ohio River

== Gallery ==
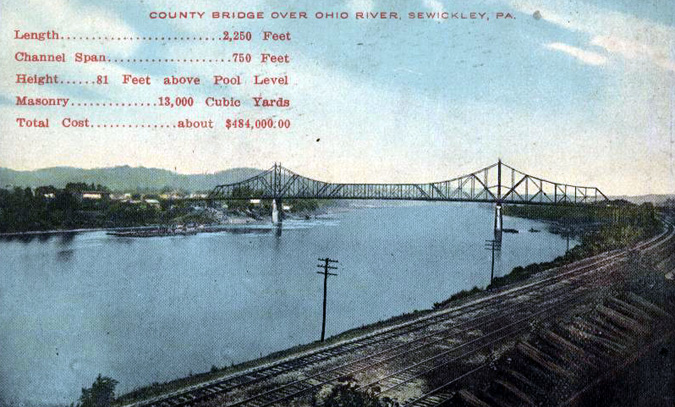
1910 Postcard image of the old Sewickley Bridge

Builder's plaque from the original Sewickley Bridge

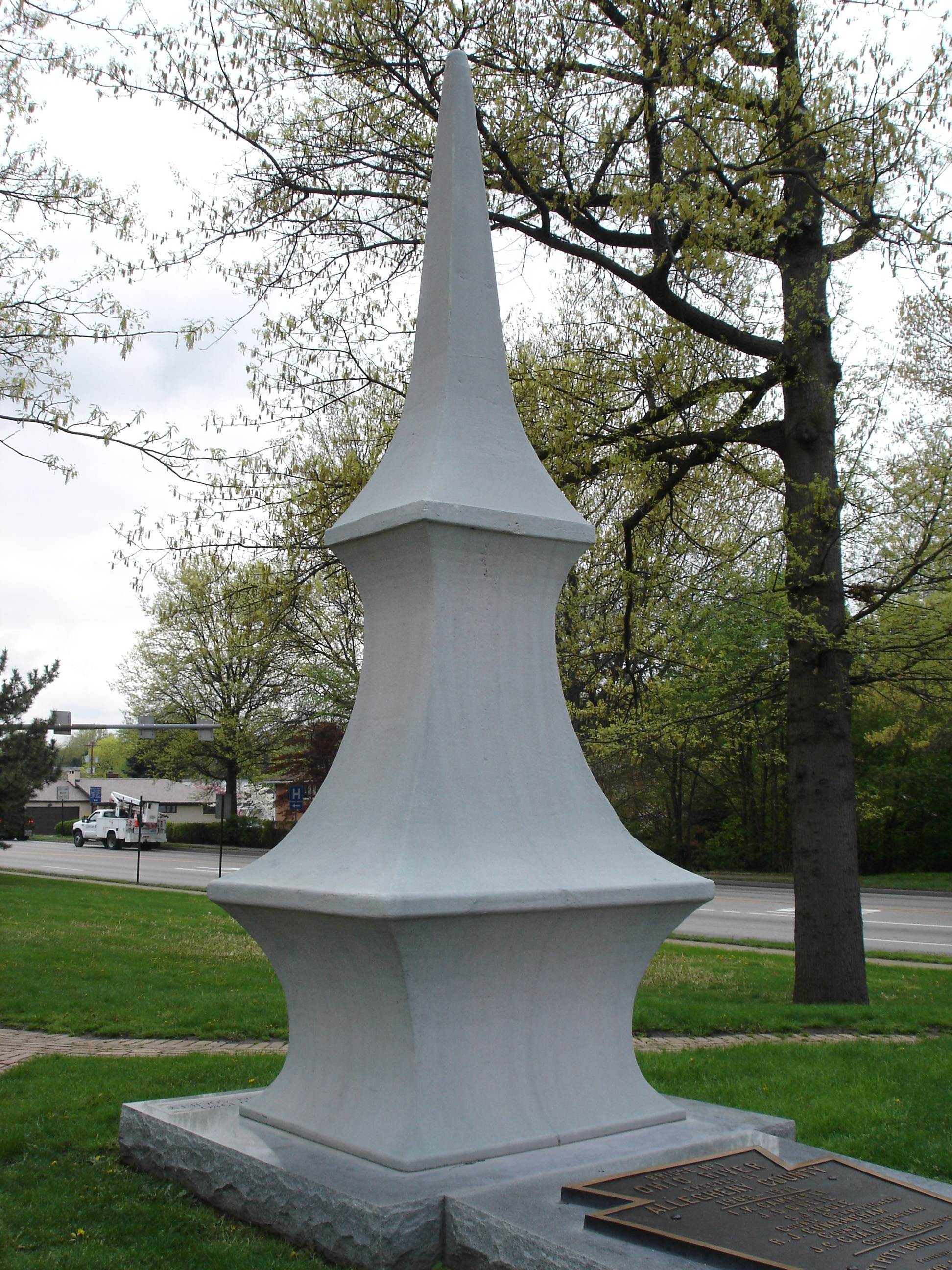
Finial of the original Sewickley Bridge, preserved in a park in Sewickley
