= Pennsylvania Route 51 =

State highway in Pennsylvania

Pennsylvania Route 51

Route information
- Maintained by PennDOT
- Length: 89.227 mi (143.597 km)
- Existed: 1929–present

Major junctions
- South end: US 40 Bus. in Uniontown
- US 119 / PA 43 near Uniontown; I-70 in Rostraver; PA Turnpike 43 near Clairton; I-376 / US 19 / US 22 / US 30 / US 19 Truck in Pittsburgh; I-79 near Coraopolis; I-376 in West Mayfield
- North end: SR 14 at the Ohio state line near East Palestine, OH

Location
- Country: United States
- State: Pennsylvania
- Counties: Allegheny, Fayette, Westmoreland, Beaver

Highway system
- Pennsylvania State Route System; Interstate; US; State; Scenic; Legislative
← PA 50	→ PA 52

Pennsylvania Route 51 (PA 51) is a major state highway that is located in Western Pennsylvania in the United States. It runs for 89 miles (143 km) from Uniontown to the Ohio state line near Darlington, where it connects with Ohio State Route 14.

PA 51 is the termination point for Pennsylvania Route 43, Pennsylvania Route 48 and Pennsylvania Route 88. The route is a major connection from Uniontown and the rest of Fayette County to Pittsburgh.

The highway is four-lane highway that is located south of Pittsburgh; it passes through Pittsburgh's South Hills before narrowing to a two-lane road through several boroughs along the Ohio River. It then becomes four lanes again after passing Chippewa Township in Beaver County and continues to the Ohio border.

In the South Hills, PA 51 (Saw Mill Run Boulevard), along with US 19, is one of the major routes in and out of Pittsburgh, as it provides access to several bridges and tunnels. PA 51 is one of the highways that enters the West End Circle, an intersection in the West End.

== Route description ==
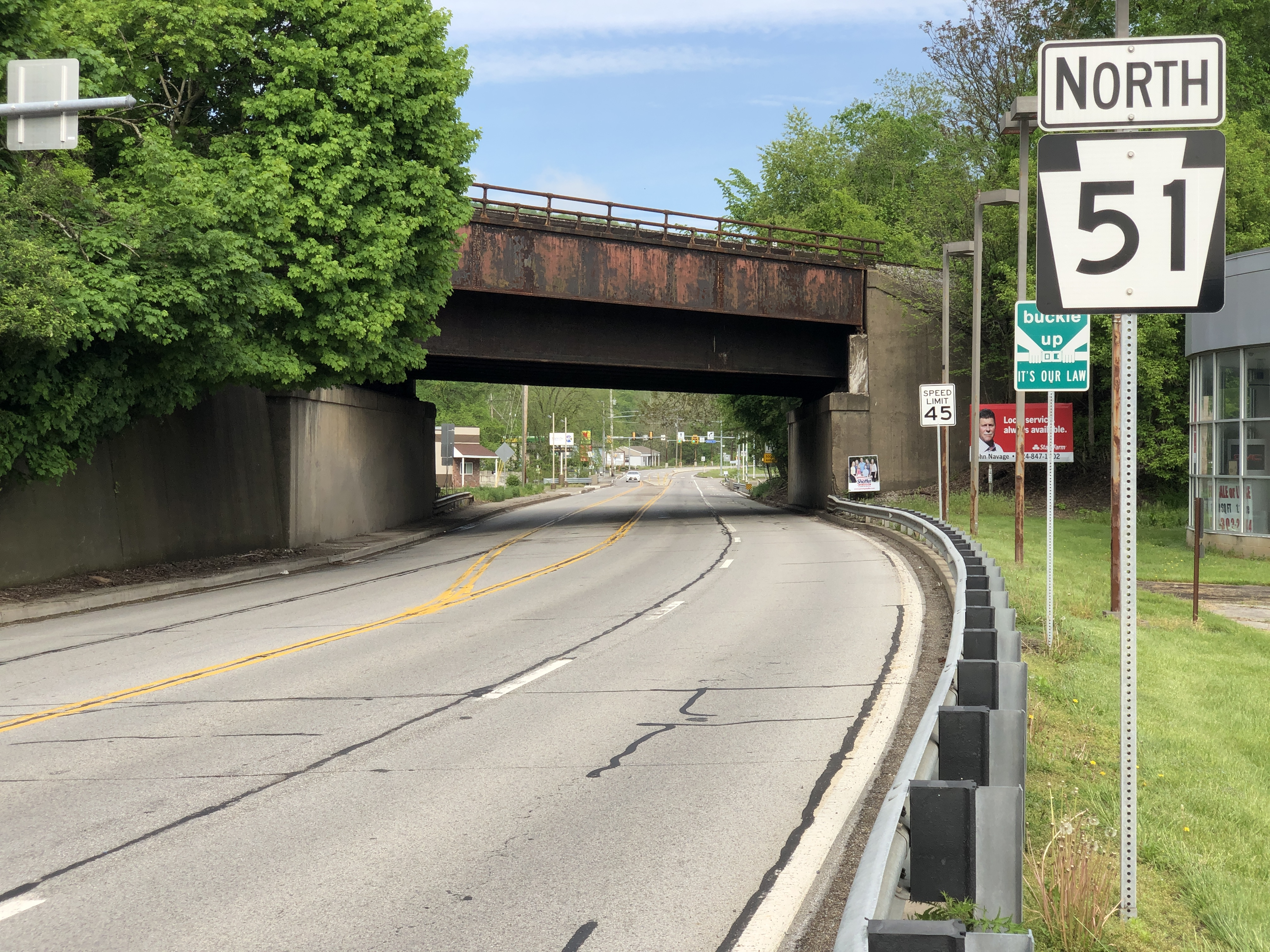
PA 51 northbound in Bridgewater

=== Fayette and Westmoreland counties ===
PA 51 begins as Pittsburgh Street in downtown Uniontown at an intersection with U.S. Route 40 Business. As PA 51 heads north, it exits Uniontown and intersects with U.S. Route 119, Uniontown's bypass. North of US 119, PA 51 is a rural, multi-lane divided highway that is also known as Pittsburgh Road. In North Union Township, PA 51 divides for 0.7 miles (1.1 km); the road has a large median that is home to several businesses. It then shifts towards the northwest, continuing as a multi-lane divided highway. In Perry Township, PA 51 intersects Pennsylvania Route 201 at a cloverleaf interchange. North of PA 201, it enters the borough of Perryopolis as Fuller Drive; after leaving the city to the north, PA 51 begins to parallel the Youghiogheny River.

Upon entering Westmoreland County, PA 51 intersects the southern terminus of Pennsylvania Route 981. About 2,000 feet (610 m) northwest of PA 981, it also intersects Interstate 70 at exits 46 A-B to form a full cloverleaf interchange. To the northwest in Sweeneys Crossroads, the road intersects Pennsylvania Route 201 again. PA 51 divides before reaching the county border and also passes by Rostraver Airport. Route 51 only spends seven miles (11 km) in Westmoreland County, all in Rostraver Township.

=== Allegheny and Beaver counties ===
Upon entering Allegheny County, PA 51 is called Hayden Boulevard, and it meets with Pennsylvania Route 136 at a diamond interchange. PA 51 intersects the southern terminus of Pennsylvania Route 48 in Forward Township before entering the boroughs of Elizabeth and West Elizabeth. In West Elizabeth, after crossing the Monongahela River via the Regis R. Malady Bridge, PA 51 immediately intersects with Pennsylvania Route 837. It then continues towards Jefferson Hills in the northwest, where it meets the northern terminus of Pennsylvania Route 43 (Mon-Fayette Expressway) at exit 54. PA 43 is expected to extend further north of PA 51. Northwest of PA 43, PA 51 becomes Clairton Boulevard. In Pleasant Hills and West Mifflin, PA 51 passes by the former Century III Mall, which was formerly one of the largest malls in the area. The stretch of PA 51/Clairton Blvd. continues through Baldwin Borough, Whitehall, and Brentwood. At the border of Brentwood and Overbrook, PA 51 becomes Saw Mill Run Boulevard.

At the southern tip of Pittsburgh, PA 51 intersects the northern terminus of Pennsylvania Route 88 before continuing towards the north as Saw Mill Run Blvd. It meets with the Liberty Tunnel connector, which leads towards the Liberty Bridge and Interstate 579; PA 51 also begins a concurrency with U.S. Route 19 Truck at this junction. The US 19 Truck/PA 51 concurrency ends when US 19 TRK joins Interstate 376, U.S. Route 22, and U.S. Route 30 at exit 5. At this point, PA 51 begins a brief concurrency with U.S. Route 19 through the West End Bypass, a short expressway in Pittsburgh's West End section. The concurrency ends as US 19 crosses the Ohio River on the West End Bridge while PA 51 turns left, heading toward McKees Rocks to the northwest as West Carson Street, paralleling the Ohio River. Entering McKees Rocks, it makes a 90 degree turn to become Locust Street, then makes another turn to become Charties Avenue, and makes a final turn towards the northwest to become Island Avenue. In Stowe Township, PA 51 becomes Robinson Boulevard (formerly Fleming Park Rd.) and passes south of Neville Island on the Ohio River. After a couple of S-curves, PA 51 becomes Coraopolis Road and intersects Interstate 79 at exit 64. It becomes State Avenue in Coraopolis before dividing into two one-way streets called 4th and 5th Avenues. North of Coraopolis, PA 51 continues to parallel the Ohio River as University Boulevard in Moon Township. It then becomes Stoops Ferry Road and passes through Crescent Township on McGovern Boulevard before entering Beaver County. The route spends 36 miles in Allegheny County.

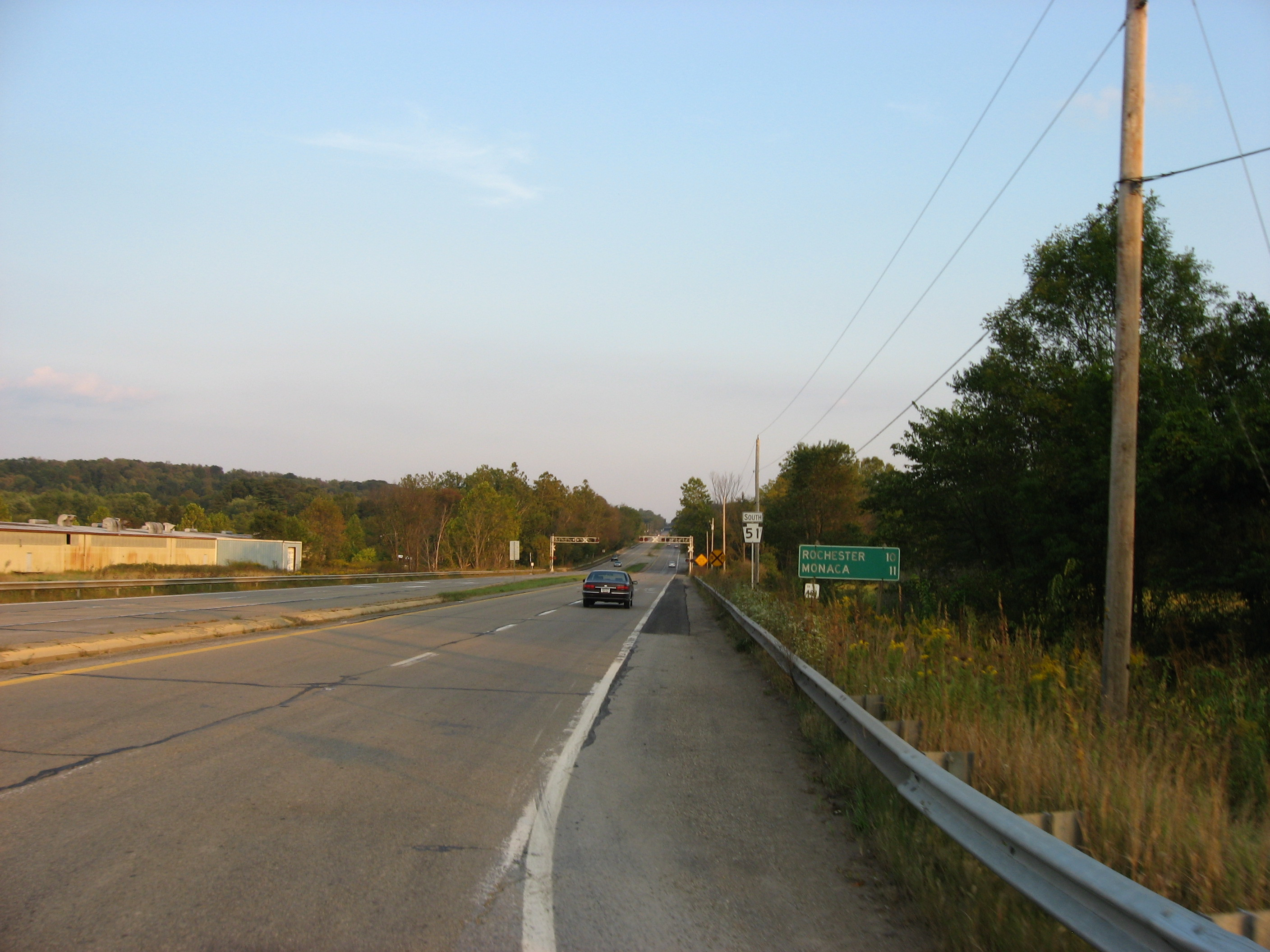
PA 51 in northwestern Beaver County

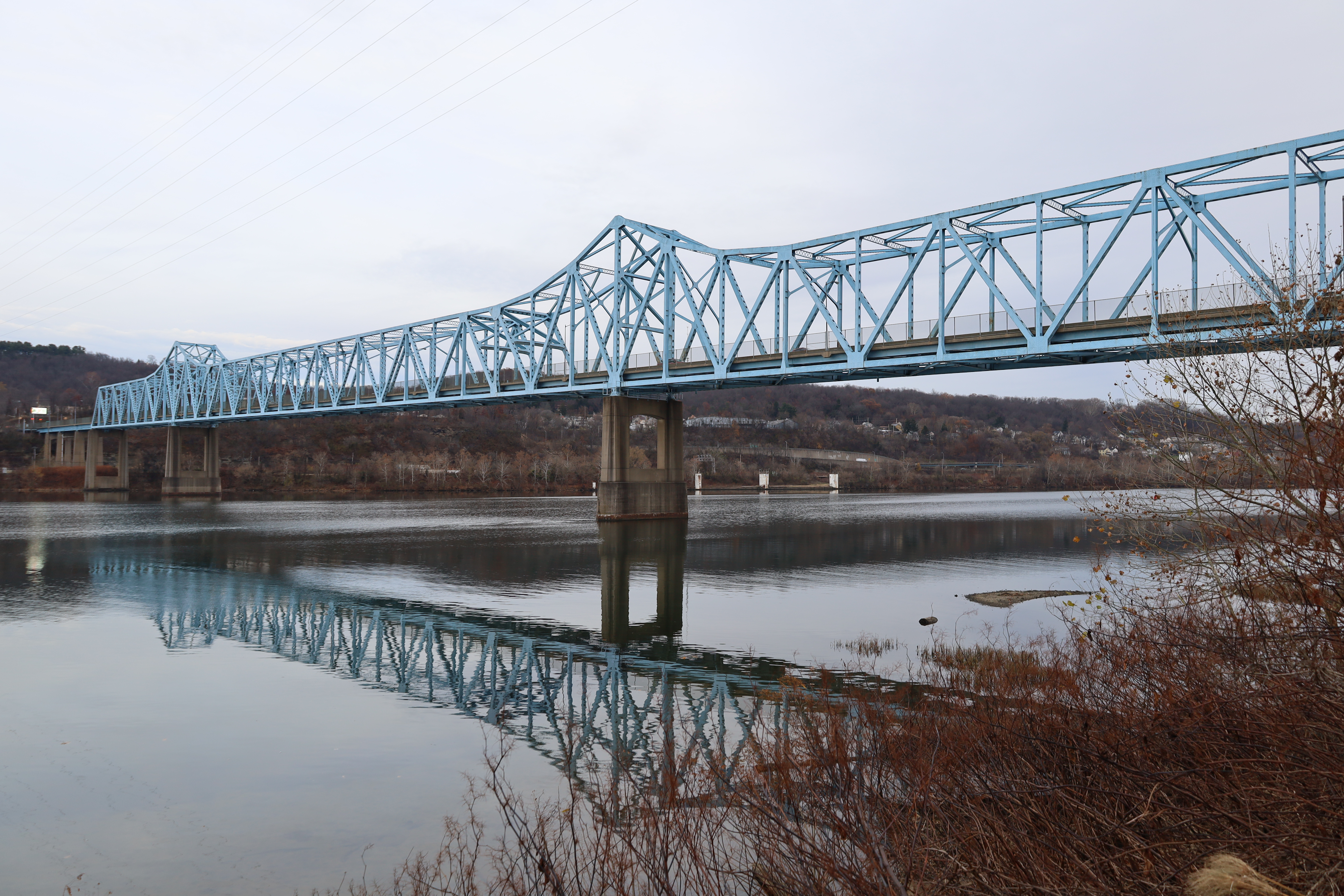
PA 51 crosses the Ohio River on the Monaca–East Rochester Bridge

At the Beaver County line, PA 51 intersects the eastern terminus of Pennsylvania Route 151. North of PA 151, PA 51 enters South Heights as Jordan Street. The route extends past the Ambridge-Aliquippa bridge, through the city of Aliquippa and West Aliquippa. Farther to the north, the highway heads towards the north as Constitution Boulevard entering Monaca as Beaver and Pennsylvania Avenues before making a 90-degree turn towards the north. PA 51 crosses the Ohio River on the Monaca–East Rochester Bridge, entering the borough of East Rochester. It makes a 90-degree turn to the west to begin a concurrency with Pennsylvania Route 65. In Rochester, PA 51/PA 65 meet with Pennsylvania Route 18; the concurrency ends in downtown Rochester, when PA 51 begins a concurrency with Pennsylvania Route 68. PA 51/PA 68 cross the Beaver River on the Beaver Bridge. In Bridgewater, the PA 51/PA 68 concurrency ends when PA 51 makes a 45-degree turn towards the northwest and continues towards the northwest as Constitution Boulevard. In Chippewa Township, it intersects Interstate 376 (James E. Ross Highway) at exit 31. Northwest of I-376, Route 51 intersects the western terminus of Pennsylvania Route 588 and Pennsylvania Route 251. In South Beaver Township, PA 51 intersects Pennsylvania Route 168 and continues towards the northwest as Constitution Boulevard. PA 51 terminates (ends) at the Ohio state line; in Ohio, it continues as Ohio State Route 14.

== History ==
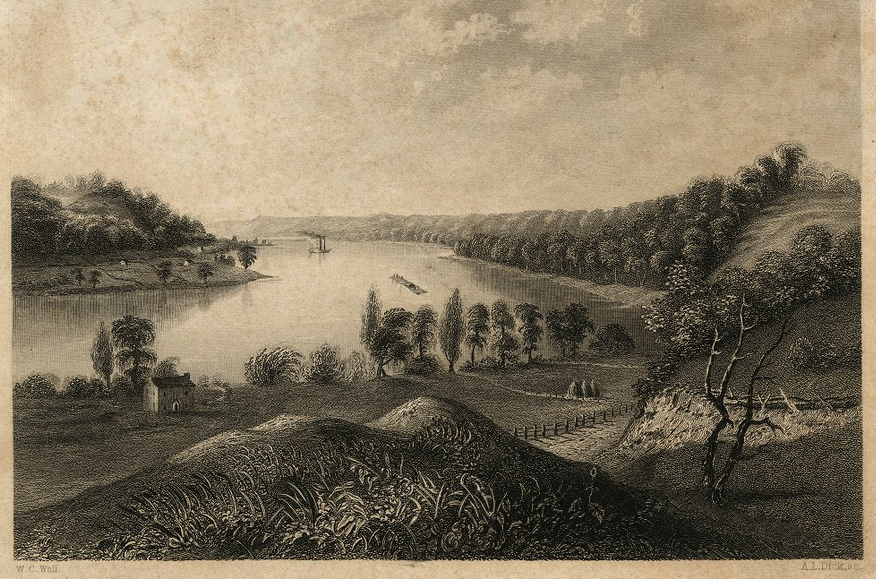
Pittsburgh, Pennsylvania along the Ohio river early depiction of PA 51 headed toward McKees Rocks early 1800s (What is now PA 51 along the Ohio River in the early 1800s looking toward the Point)

Route 51 was first signed in 1927. The north section was signed first, followed by the section between Pittsburgh and Uniontown. Major construction projects included a bypass of Perryopolis built in 1950, the West End Bypass in Pittsburgh that was completed in 1953, and the interchange at the southern portal of the Liberty Tunnels in Pittsburgh. Unlike PA 88 and PA 28, Route 51 wasn't truncated in 1961 to reduce concurrencies, making it the only major state route (not including U.S. routes or Interstate routes) to still pass through Pittsburgh following the separation of PA 65 and PA 50 from PA 88 & PA 28, respectively; PA 51 serves as a link between PA 88 & PA 65 and, via PA 60, I-376, & I-279, a link between PA 28 & PA 50.

Before the turnpikes were built, Route 51, alongside Ohio State Route 14, served as the main corridor connecting Pittsburgh and Cleveland.

The Saw Mill Run Boulevard section of the highway was the first direct connection between Pittsburgh and the South Hills once the Liberty Tunnel was completed. It significantly decreased the driving time to Pittsburgh from the cities of Clairton, Duquesne, McKeesport.

Improvements are planned at the intersection with PA 88 south of Pittsburgh, where bottlenecks occur regularly. Other improvements planned include new interchanges at the Liberty Tunnel and West End Bridge (West End Circle), a center median for the rest of Saw Mill Run Boulevard, and an improved intersection with Woodruff Street.

=== Saw Mill Run Expressway (canceled) ===
The Saw Mill Run Expressway was a highway proposed for the South Hills. It would have been built on the same right-of-way as Saw Mill Run Boulevard. In 1964, while designated as "the worst bottleneck in Western Pennsylvania," a plan was made to turn the crowded highway into an expressway. The plan was proposed to the Department of Highways and included a renovation of the Liberty Tunnel, several widening projects, new turning lanes, and a central median. The plan would have required cooperation from the surrounding communities.

The finished product was to include a 5.5-mile (8.9 km) limited access expressway from Overbrook to the West End. It would have been twice the width of the current highway and had a total cost of nearly $150 million. Interest in the expressway declined once the Southwestern Pennsylvania Regional Planning Commission expressed concerns about business along the corridor, and the project was dropped in 1973.

== Major intersections ==
County	Location	mi	km	Destinations	Notes
Fayette	Uniontown	0.000	0.000	US 40 Bus. east (West Fayette Street) / SR 3019 (Morgantown Street)	Southern terminus; US 40 Bus. on a one-way pair
Fayette	Uniontown	0.148	0.238	US 40 Bus. west (West Main Street)	US 40 Bus. on a one-way pair
Fayette	North Union Township	1.188– 1.303	1.912– 2.097	US 119 / PA 43 south to US 40 – Connellsville, Hopwood	Interchange
Fayette	North Union Township	1.704	2.742	Northgate Highway to US 40 west / PA Turnpike 43 north – Brownsville, Pittsburgh	
Fayette	Perry Township	11.368– 11.712	18.295– 18.849	PA 201 (Fayette City Boulevard) – Fayette City, Connellsville	Interchange
Westmoreland	Rostraver Township	18.904	30.423	PA 981 north – Smithton	Southern terminus of PA 981
Westmoreland	Rostraver Township	19.031– 19.332	30.627– 31.112	I-70 – Washington, New Stanton	Exit 46 (I-70)
Westmoreland	Rostraver Township	21.264– 21.757	34.221– 35.014	PA 201 (Rostraver Road) – West Newton, Belle Vernon	Interchange
Allegheny	Elizabeth Township	24.879– 25.076	40.039– 40.356	PA 136 (West Newton Road) – Monongahela, Donora, West Newton	Interchange
Allegheny	Forward Township	26.366	42.432	PA 48 north / Orange Belt (Scenery Drive) / Payday Drive PA 48 Truck begins	Southern terminus of PA 48; southern end of PA 48 Truck concurrency; southeastern terminus of Orange Belt
Allegheny	Elizabeth	29.623– 29.716	47.674– 47.823	PA 48 Truck north / PA 51 Truck north (North 2nd Avenue / North 3rd Avenue) – Elizabeth, Glassport, Bunola	Interchange; northern end of PA 48 Truck concurrency; southern terminus of PA 51 Truck
Allegheny	Monongahela River	29.747– 30.031	47.873– 48.330	Regis R. Malady Bridge	
Allegheny	West Elizabeth	30.068– 30.323	48.390– 48.800	PA 837 / PA 51 Truck south – Clairton, West Elizabeth	Interchange; northern terminus of PA 51 Truck
Allegheny	Jefferson Hills	31.101– 31.161	50.052– 50.149	Ridge Road – Clairton	Interchange
Allegheny	Jefferson Hills	32.685– 32.776	52.601– 52.748	PA Turnpike 43 south / Payne Hill Road to PA 885 – California	Temporary northern terminus and exit 54 on PA 43; access via Jefferson Boulevard
Allegheny	West Mifflin	36.953– 37.084	59.470– 59.681	Yellow Belt (Curry Hollow Road / Lebanon Church Road) to PA 885 – McKeesport, West Mifflin, South Park, Bethel Park	Interchange
Allegheny	Pittsburgh	40.649	65.418	PA 88 south / Blue Belt (Library Road) – South Park	Northern terminus of PA 88, southern terminus of Blue Belt concurrency
Allegheny	Pittsburgh	40.825	65.701	Blue Belt (Maytide Street)	Northern terminus of Blue Belt concurrency
Allegheny	Pittsburgh	42.942– 43.228	69.108– 69.569	US 19 Truck south (Liberty Avenue) / Liberty Tunnel to I-579 north – Downtown, South Side, Dormont	Interchange; southern terminus of US 19 Truck concurrency
Allegheny	Pittsburgh	98.163– 98.106	157.978– 157.886	I-376 west / US 19 south (US 22 west / US 30 west / US 19 Truck north) – Carnegie, Airport, West End	Exit 69B (I-376/US 22/US 30); northern terminus of US 19 Truck concurrency; southern terminus of US 19 concurrency
Allegheny	Pittsburgh	97.841– 97.443	157.460– 156.819	US 19 north / PA 60 north (South Main Street) / PA 837 south (Carson Street) to I-279 north / I-376 east / PA 65 – Downtown, West End Bridge, North Shore, Crafton	Northern terminus of US 19 concurrency; southern terminus of PA 60; northern terminus of PA 837
Allegheny	McKees Rocks	96.080	154.626	Blue Belt (Chartiers Ave)	Southern terminus of Blue Belt concurrency; to Ohio Valley Hospital
Allegheny	McKees Rocks	94.908	152.740	Blue Belt (McKees Rocks Bridge (SR 3104))	Northern terminus of Blue Belt concurrency
Allegheny	Robinson Township	94.678– 94.602	152.369– 152.247	I-79 – Washington, Erie	Exit 64 (I-79)
Allegheny	Robinson Township	94.337	151.821	Yellow Belt (North Forest Grove Road) – Forest Grove	Eastern terminus of Yellow Belt concurrency
Allegheny	Coraopolis	91.735	147.633	Yellow Belt (Ferree Street / Coraopolis Bridge) to I-79 north	Western terminus of Yellow Belt concurrency
Allegheny	Moon Township	90.928	146.334	Orange Belt (Sewickley Bridge) to PA 65 – Sewickley	Southern terminus of Orange Belt concurrency
Allegheny	Moon Township	89.242	143.621	Orange Belt (University Boulevard) to I-376 BL	Northern terminus of Orange Belt concurrency
Beaver	South Heights	86.970	139.965	PA 151 west (Laurel Road) to I-376	Eastern terminus of PA 151
Beaver	Aliquippa	85.706– 85.455	137.930– 137.526	Sheffield Avenue / Kiehl Street – Aliquippa	Interchange
Beaver	Ohio River	70.729– 71.115	113.827– 114.448	Monaca–East Rochester Bridge	
Beaver	East Rochester	82.404	132.616	PA 65 south – Ambridge, Pittsburgh	Southern terminus of PA 65 concurrency
Beaver	Rochester	80.530	129.600	PA 18 south (Rochester–Monaca Bridge) / PA 68 east – Rochester	Interchange
Beaver	Rochester	78.925– 78.807	127.017– 126.828	PA 18 / PA 65 north / PA 68 east – New Brighton, Beaver Falls, Rochester	Northern terminus of PA 65 concurrency; southern terminus of PA 68 concurrency
Beaver	Bridgewater	78.129	125.736	PA 68 west – Beaver	Northern terminus of PA 68 concurrency; northbound exit and southbound entrance
Beaver	Chippewa Township	77.506– 77.121	124.734– 124.114	I-376 to I-76 / Penna Turnpike – Pittsburgh, New Castle	Exit 31 (I-376)
Beaver	Chippewa Township	76.723	123.474	PA 588 east (Darlington Road) – Beaver Falls, Eastvale	Western terminus of PA 588
Beaver	Chippewa Township	76.332	122.844	PA 251 (Shenango Road) – Negley, OH, Beaver Falls	
Beaver	South Beaver Township	75.936	122.207	PA 168 (Salem Church Road) – Ohioville, Darlington	
Beaver	Darlington	75.758	121.921	SR 14 west	Continuation into Ohio
1.000 mi = 1.609 km; 1.000 km = 0.621 mi: Incomplete access

== Related routes ==
=== Pittsburgh truck route ===
Pennsylvania Route 51 Truck
- Location: Pittsburgh

Pennsylvania Route 51 Truck (PA 51 Truck) is a truck route along major roads in downtown Pittsburgh, such as I-376, I-279, and I-579, in an effort to bypass PA 51, which features some unsafe S-Curves and falling rocks that could be deleterious for trucks. Motorists traveling on PA 51 should use PA 51 Truck to travel downtown and avoid these dangers.

=== Elizabeth truck route ===
Pennsylvania Route 51 Truck
- Location: Elizabeth
- Existed: 2013–present

Pennsylvania Route 51 Truck (PA 51 Truck) is a truck route of PA 51 that bypassed the weight-restricted Regis R. Malady Bridge over the Monongahela River between Elizabeth and West Elizabeth, on which trucks over 32 tons and combination loads over 40 tons are prohibited. The route follows McKeesport Road, Lincoln Boulevard, Glassport-Elizabeth Road, the Clairton-Glassport Bridge over the Monongahela River, and PA 837. The route was formed in 2013; however, as of 2021, there were no weight restrictions listed on the bridge by PennDOT. As of 2022, the route is still signed.

Previously there was a 1/2-mile-long (0.80 km) truck route in the Pittsburgh suburb of Elizabeth. The truck designation was not intended for vehicles already on PA 51, but for those entering the highway southbound. A cloverleaf has been established to direct traffic between Elizabeth's main street (known as Center Ave and McKeesport Road on different ends of town), but its narrow and winding design makes it difficult for trucks to access Route 51 southbound. As a result, they were directed to enter onto Route 51 northbound, cross the bridge over the Monongahela River, and use a special u-turn exit to reach southbound lanes of travel. This truck route was removed after a weight limit was imposed on the Regis R. Malady Bridge over the Monongahela River.

The entire route was in Allegheny County.

Location	mi	km	Destinations	Notes
Elizabeth	0.00	0.00	PA 51 / PA 48 Truck south to PA Turnpike 43 / 2nd Avenue – Uniontown, Pittsburgh, Bunola	Southern terminus of PA 51 Truck; southern end of concurrency with PA 48 Truck
Glassport	3.82	6.15	Ohio Avenue to PA 148 – Glassport, McKeesport	
Monongahela River	3.82– 4.26	6.15– 6.86	Clairton-Glassport Bridge	
Clairton	4.26	6.86	PA 837 north / PA 48 Truck north (North State Street) / Carnegie Avenue – Dravosburg	Northern end of concurrency with PA 48 Truck; southern end of concurrency with PA 837
Clairton	4.44	7.15	PA 885 north (Walnut Avenue) – West Mifflin	Southern terminus of PA 885
West Elizabeth	7.42	11.94	PA 51 / PA 837 south (5th Street) to PA Turnpike 43 – Elizabeth, Pittsburgh, West Elizabeth	Northern terminus of PA 51 Truck; northern end of concurrency with PA 837
1.000 mi = 1.609 km; 1.000 km = 0.621 mi: Concurrency terminus

=== Beaver County truck route ===
Pennsylvania Route 51 Truck
- Location: Beaver County
- Length: 0.2 mi (320 m)

Pennsylvania Route 51 Truck is a connector truck route. PA 251 turns from Darlington Road onto Shenango Road for a tenth of a mile before intersecting PA 51, which is a narrow turn for trucks. The route follows Darlington Road from PA 251 to PA 51/PA 588 in Beaver County, Pennsylvania.

== In popular culture ==
Signage for PA Rt 51 can be seen in the video for "Life In A Northern Town" by British musical group The Dream Academy at approximately 1:50.
