= Joseph Henry Pendleton =

United States Marine Corps general

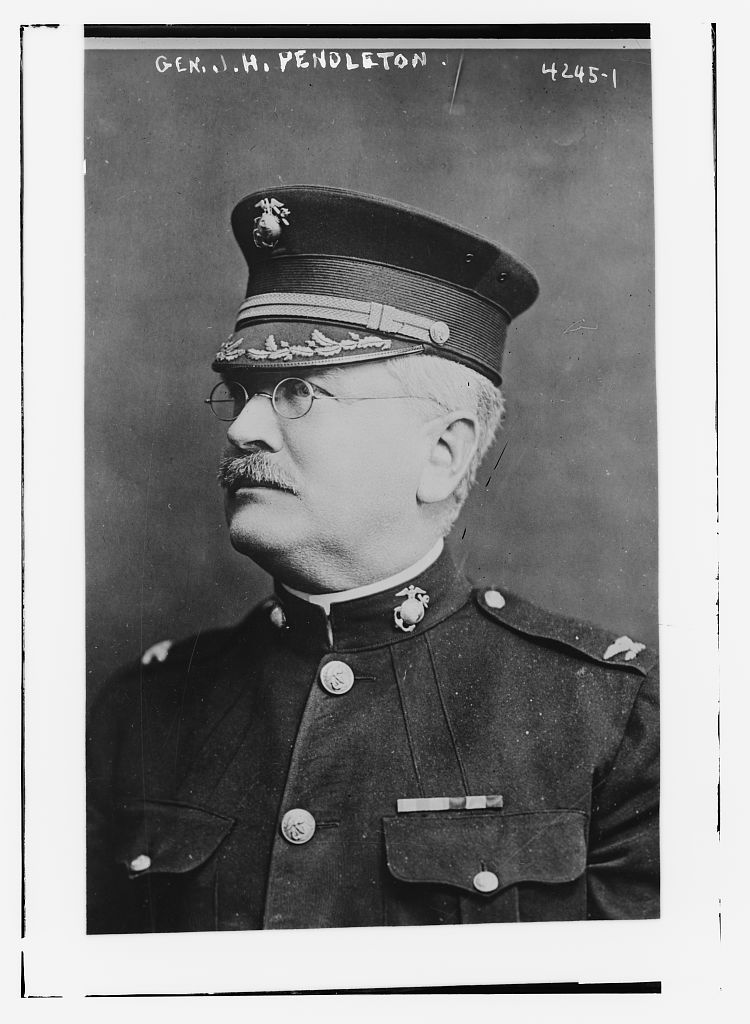
- Pendleton in 1917
- Born: June 2, 1860; Rochester, Pennsylvania, US
- Died: February 4, 1942 (aged 81); Coronado, California, US
- Burial place: Fort Rosecrans National Cemetery
- Military career
- Allegiance: United States
- Branch: United States Marine Corps
- Service years: 1884–1924
- Rank: Major General
- Conflicts: Spanish–American War; Philippine–American War; Banana Wars 1912–1913; 1916
- Awards: Navy Cross

Major General Joseph Henry Pendleton (June 2, 1860 – February 4, 1942) was a United States Marine Corps general for whom Marine Corps Base Camp Pendleton is named. Pendleton served in the Marine Corps for over 40 years.

== Biography ==
Joseph Henry Pendleton was born on June 2, 1860, in East Rochester, Pennsylvania, which is about 25 miles NW of Pittsburgh, to Joseph Rhodes Pendleton and Martha Jane Cross. He was appointed to the United States Naval Academy in 1878. He graduated from the engineering program at the Naval Academy in 1882 and was appointed a second lieutenant on July 1, 1884. He was a supporter of Henry George's economic philosophy, now often known as Georgism.

=== Early Marine Corps career ===
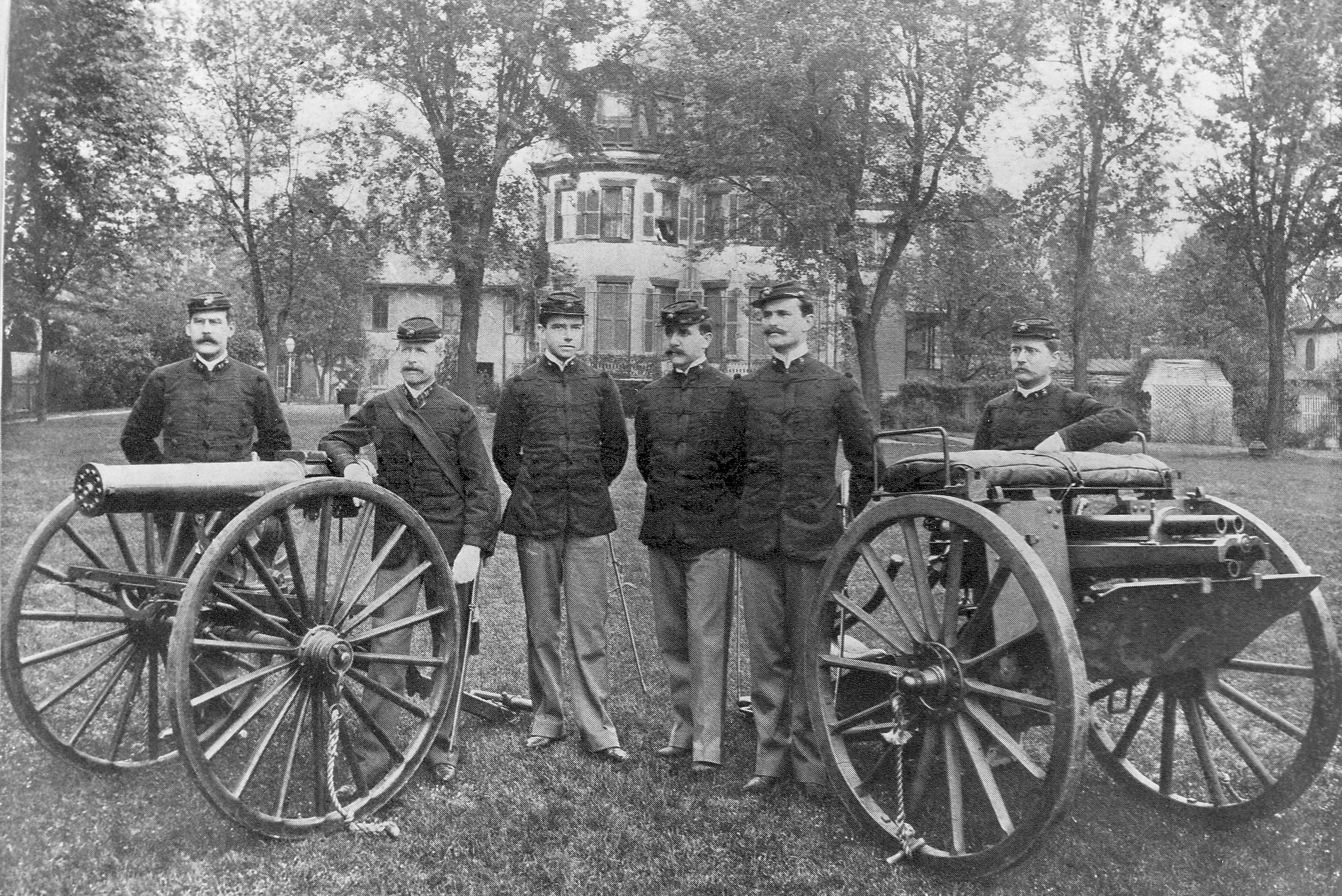
USMC Officers at Marine Barracks, Washington D.C. in 1896. Then First Lieutenant Pendleton is on the far right.

His first duty was performed at the Marine Barracks, Brooklyn Navy Yard where he served from August 31, 1884, to February 7, 1885. From here Second Lieutenant Pendleton went to the Portsmouth Naval Shipyard in Kittery, Maine, and joined the USS Pensacola on March 20, 1885. On March 6, 1888, Lieutenant Pendleton reported to the Marine Barracks, Brooklyn Navy Yard. His next duty was at the Marine Barracks, Mare Island Naval Shipyard, California, where he served from May 24, 1889, to May 12, 1892, but between June 21 and October 14, 1891, he was on temporary detached duty on board the AL-KI, cruising the Bering Sea.

On June 28, 1891, Pendleton was promoted to the grade of first lieutenant. First Lieutenant Pendleton served at the Marine Barracks, Sitka, Alaska, from June 5, 1892, to June 28, 1894, and also from November 3, 1899, to March 21, 1904. During the period intervening between these two tours of duty in Alaska, Lieutenant Pendleton served at Marine Barracks Washington Navy Yard, New York, Annapolis, and on board the USS Yankee.

First Lieutenant Pendleton was promoted to captain on March 3, 1899, and to major on March 3, 1903. After being detached from the Marine Barracks, Sitka, Alaska, on March 21, 1904, Major Pendleton reported to the Marine Barracks, Mare Island, California, on April 2, 1904. On May 28, 1904, he joined the First Brigade of Marines in the Philippines and on April 7, 1905, reported to Olongapo City, where he served until January 27, 1906.

From February 5, to July 26, 1906, Major Pendleton commanded the Marines on the Island of Guam. From September 29, 1906, to September 20, 1909, Major Pendleton commanded the Marine Barracks at Navy Yard Puget Sound, Bremerton, Washington.

=== Service in Cuba and the Philippines ===
On January 1, 1908, Major Pendleton was promoted to the grade of lieutenant colonel. Lieutenant Colonel Pendleton joined the First Brigade of Marines in the Philippines for his second tour of duty there, on November 4, 1908. He performed duty as the Commanding Officer of the First Brigade and the Post Commander, and Commanding Officer of the First Brigade and the Post Commander, and Commanding Officer of the First Regiment, at Olongapo City. On May 23, 1911, Lieutenant Colonel Pendleton was promoted to the grade of colonel.

=== Service in Nicaragua and Cuba, 1912–1913 ===
He was detached from the Philippine Islands on May 6, 1912, and returned to the United States via the Suez Canal and Europe, reporting to the Marine Barracks Portsmouth, New Hampshire, on August 1, 1912. Colonel Pendleton was detached on temporary foreign shore service from August 23, 1912, until December 16, 1912. This foreign service covered the period of the 1912 operations in Nicaragua. Colonel Pendleton was in command of the Marines during this campaign in the skirmishes at Masaya and Chichigalpa, and the capture of Coyotepe and Leon. From February 19, to June 1, 1913, Colonel Pendleton was absent with an expeditionary force at Guantanamo Bay Naval Base, Cuba. On August 20, 1913, he was detached from the Marine Barracks at Portsmouth.

From September 13, 1913, to December 19, 1914, Colonel Pendleton was in command of the Marine Barracks at Puget Sound, Washington, and was absent on expeditionary duty for a good part of this period.

=== Service in San Diego ===
He was absent in command of the Fourth Regiment from April 17, to December 19, 1914, on board the USS South Dakota, and at Camp Howard, North Island, San Diego. From December 19, 1914, to February 3, 1916, Colonel Pendleton was in command of the Fourth Regiment at San Diego, part of the time being absent on expeditionary duty and temporary sea duty with the Pacific Fleet.

From February 3, to December 31, 1916, Colonel Pendleton was in command of the Marine Barracks at San Diego, but from June 6, to December 31, 1916, he was absent on expeditionary duty in command of the Fourth Regiment. He was placed in command of all Naval Forces ashore in Santo Domingo on June 19, 1916, as part of the occupation of the Dominican Republic. Colonel Pendleton was promoted to Brigadier General on August 29, 1916.

The Navy Cross was awarded to Brigadier General Pendleton for "exceptionally meritorious service in a duty of great responsibility June 18 to 31 December 1916, as Commanding Officer of the Second Provisional Brigade of Marines in support of the Government of Santo Domingo; for the wise and successful administration of important offices in the Government entrusted to his charge; and in general, for unfailing efforts to promote good order and material prosperity throughout the Dominican Republic," according to the Military Times.

On November 22, 1916, Brigadier General Pendleton was detailed to command the Second Provisional Brigade in Santo Domingo, and on December 31, 1916, was detached from the Marine Barracks, San Diego, and assigned to permanent duty in Santo Domingo. Brigadier General Pendleton was acting Military Governor of Santo Domingo from October 29, to November 29, 1917, and on March 18, 1918, was designated Military Governor of Santo Domingo, temporarily in the absence of the Military Governor. He was detached from Santo Domingo on October 21, 1918, and reported to Headquarters, Marine Corps, Washington, D.C., on October 28, 1918.

From November 11, 1918, to September 25, 1919, Brigadier General Pendleton commanded the Marine Barracks at Parris Island, South Carolina, and on October 1, 1919, joined the Second Advanced Base Force at San Diego, as its Commanding General.

From October 1, to November 7, 1921, General Pendleton was in command of the Department of the Pacific at San Francisco. Upon the establishment of the Fifth Brigade of Marines on October 4, 1921, General Pendleton was assigned to that organization as the commanding officer. In addition to these duties he was assigned the additional duty as Commanding General Department of the Pacific in the absence of General Barnett, from May 13, 1922, to September 2, 1922. Pendleton was promoted to Major General on December 10, 1923.

From February 9, to March 29, 1924, General Pendleton was on duty inspecting Marine Corps stations and organizations in Central America and West Indies. After this inspection trip, he was on a short tour of duty at Headquarters Marine Corps and on May 12, 1924, he resumed duties at San Diego, as Commanding Officer of the Fifth Brigade Marines.

=== Retirement ===
On June 2, 1924, at the age of 64, Pendleton retired after 40 years of service in the Marine Corps. He settled in Coronado, California and served as mayor from 1928 to 1930. He died on February 4, 1942, at his home at age 81. Pendleton was interred at Fort Rosecrans National Cemetery five days later.

== Awards and honors ==
Pendleton's awards include the Navy Cross.

The following were named for Pendleton:

- Marine Corps Base Camp Pendleton
- Pendleton Hall, the Depot Headquarters building at Marine Corps Recruit Depot San Diego
- Mary Fay Pendleton Elementary School was named after his wife
