= Monaca–East Rochester Bridge =

Bridge over the Ohio River

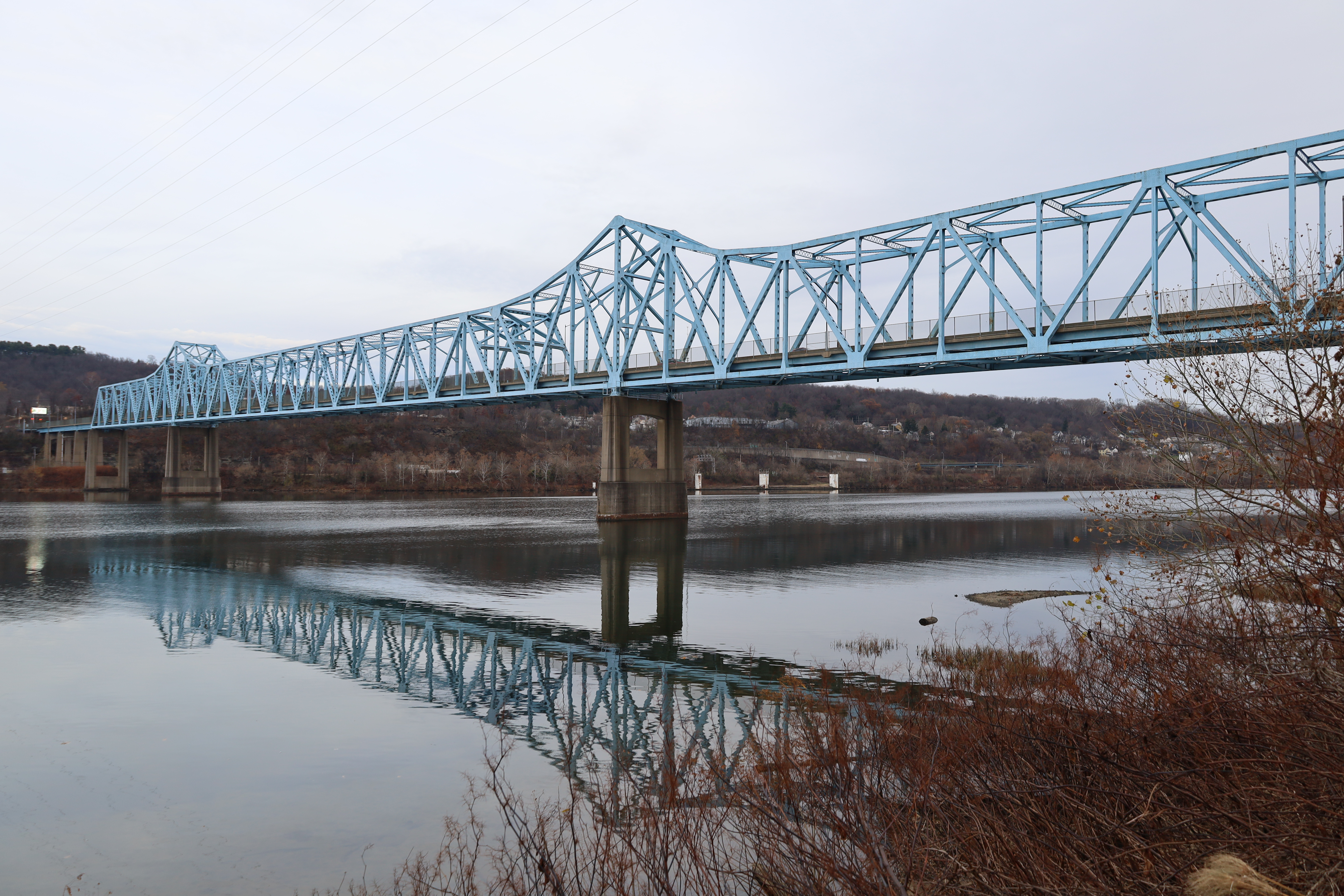
- The bridge in 2025
- Coordinates: 40.6923°N 80.2674°W
- Carries: 2 lanes of PA 51
- Crosses: Ohio River
- Locale: Monaca, Pennsylvania, East Rochester, Pennsylvania

Characteristics
- Design: Steel continuous truss bridge
- Longest span: 730 feet

History
- Opened: 1959

Location
- Interactive map of Monaca–East Rochester Bridge

The Monaca–East Rochester Bridge is a steel through continuous truss bridge which crosses the Ohio River between Monaca, Pennsylvania and East Rochester, Pennsylvania. It opened in 1959 and was tolled until 1973. By the late 1970s, the segment of PA 51 from 17th Street in Monaca to its concurrency with PA 18 across the Monaca-Rochester Bridge was moved to its current alignment across the Monaca–East Rochester Bridge and its brief concurrencies with PA 65 and PA 68.

The bridge is located 6 miles north of the Ambridge–Aliquippa Bridge.

== See also ==
- List of crossings of the Ohio River
