= Century III Mall =

Defunct mall in West Mifflin, Pennsylvania

- Century III Mall in 2017
- Location: West Mifflin, Pennsylvania, U.S.
- Coordinates: 40.338°N 79.944°W
- Address: 3075 Clairton Road
- Opened: October 24, 1979; 47 years ago (phase I); March 12, 1980; 46 years ago (phase II)
- Closed: February 16, 2019; 7 years ago
- Demolished: March 26, 2024 – April 30, 2026
- Developer: Edward J. DeBartolo Corporation; United States Steel Corporation
- Manager: Moonbeam Capital Investments
- Owner: Moonbeam Capital Investments
- Num. of stores: 200 (at peak)
- Num. of anchor tenants: 6 (at peak)
- Floor area: 1,290,000 square feet (120,000 m^{2})
- Floors: 3 (2 in former Sears, JCPenney, Macy's, and Macy's Furniture; 1 in former Dick's Sporting Goods and Steve and Barry's)
- Parking: 6,000 space garage and lot
- Public transit: Port Authority bus: 59, Y1, Y46
- Website: centuryiiimall.com (2013 archive)

Century III Mall was a large enclosed shopping mall located along Route 51 in West Mifflin, Pennsylvania, about 10 miles southeast of downtown Pittsburgh. It operated from October 1979 until its closure in February 2019. Demolition began on March 26, 2024, and was completed on April 30, 2026. Planned in 1976, the mall was built on a former slag dump. Anchor stores included Kaufmann's, Gimbels, JCPenney, Sears, and Montgomery Ward.

It was the third-largest shopping mall in the world when it opened, but was surpassed by much larger malls. The mall was a joint-venture between the Edward J. DeBartolo Corporation and United States Steel Corporation. A 1996 merger between the mall's developer, now known as the DeBartolo Realty Corporation, and Simon Property Group, brought Century III Mall under the Simon DeBartolo Group heading, who owned the mall until 2011. The mall was later acquired by Las Vegas-based Moonbeam Capital Investments LLC.

== History ==
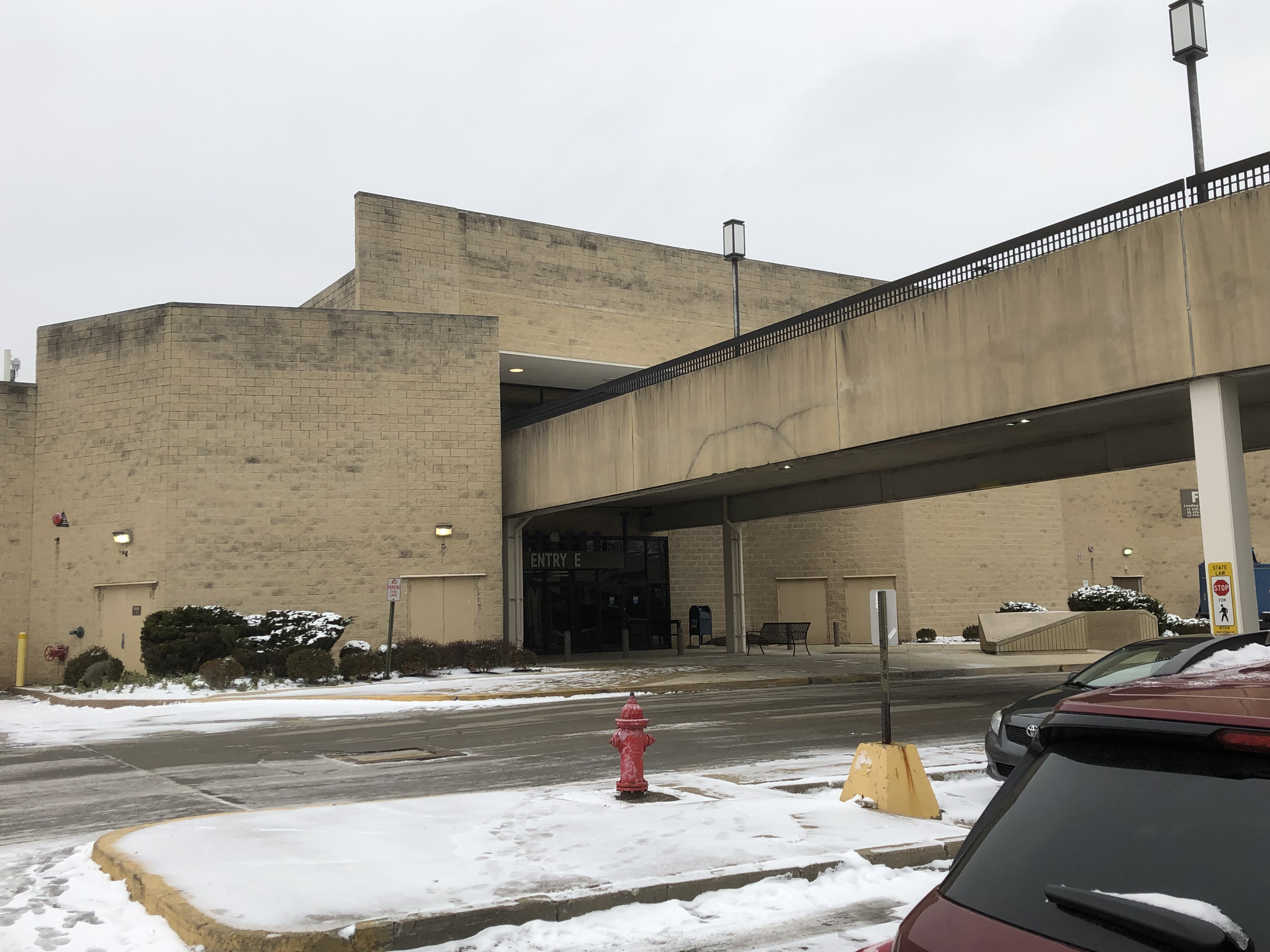
Entry E at the Mall

In 1969, USS Realty Development, a division of the United States Steel Corporation, wanted to find a more productive use for the slag heap, which had grown into an artificial mountain from years of industrial dumping. Locally known as Brown's Dump, the property encompassed 410 acres and overshadowed the landscape. The excavation and clearing of the slag was a monumental task that would span many years. As a result of the clearing, numerous businesses began to appear at the foot of the mountain by the mid-1970s.

In 1976, the Edward J. DeBartolo Corporation and USS Realty Corporation proposed a $100 million, 1.6 million square foot shopping center. The mall's moniker Century III was chosen to allude to the 1976 United States Bicentennial. The first phase of 75 stores was dedicated on October 24, 1979. This included two anchors; a two-level 121,300 square foot, Pittsburgh-based Kaufmann's, and a two-level 173,200 square foot JCPenney. The Kaufmann's unit was the chain's fourth shopping mall store and the first in the Pittsburgh region to anchor a mall-type center. Phase two, with the two-level 168,100 square foot Montgomery Ward and forty-six stores debuted March 12, 1980. The second phase of Century III Mall incorporated the third, fourth and fifth anchors to the complex, including a two-level 126,000 square foot Gimbels-Pittsburgh, which began business in July 1980 and a two-level 231,000 square foot Sears, which opened in October 1980.

The Montgomery Ward location at Century III Mall was the first such location for the Chicago-based chain in Allegheny County. The Wards location only lasted a few years, however, and ultimately closed in 1986. The Joseph Horne Company, owned by the New York City-based Associated Dry Goods Corporation, took over the space, relocating their store from an older open-air shopping center in Brentwood a few miles north. In 1994, the location changed names again when the Cincinnati-based Federated Department Stores purchased Horne's and converted the chain's locations into its own Lazarus regional nameplate. In 1999, after operating a few years as Lazarus, Federated closed several locations, including the Century III store. The location then became a unit of Kaufmann's, which opened a furniture showroom in that location. Kaufmann's was a division of the St. Louis-based May Department Stores Company.

At its peak throughout the 1980s, Century III Mall boasted over 200 stores, services, and eateries, which at the time, was the largest enclosed shopping center in the Pittsburgh tri-state area by store count. Simon Property Group acquired the mall when it merged with the DeBartolo Corporation in 1996. Shortly thereafter, the mall underwent an $8 million facelift, which included the addition of skylights in the mall's common areas and the removal of the sunken-stage site at the center court, which was completed by 1997.

=== Decline ===
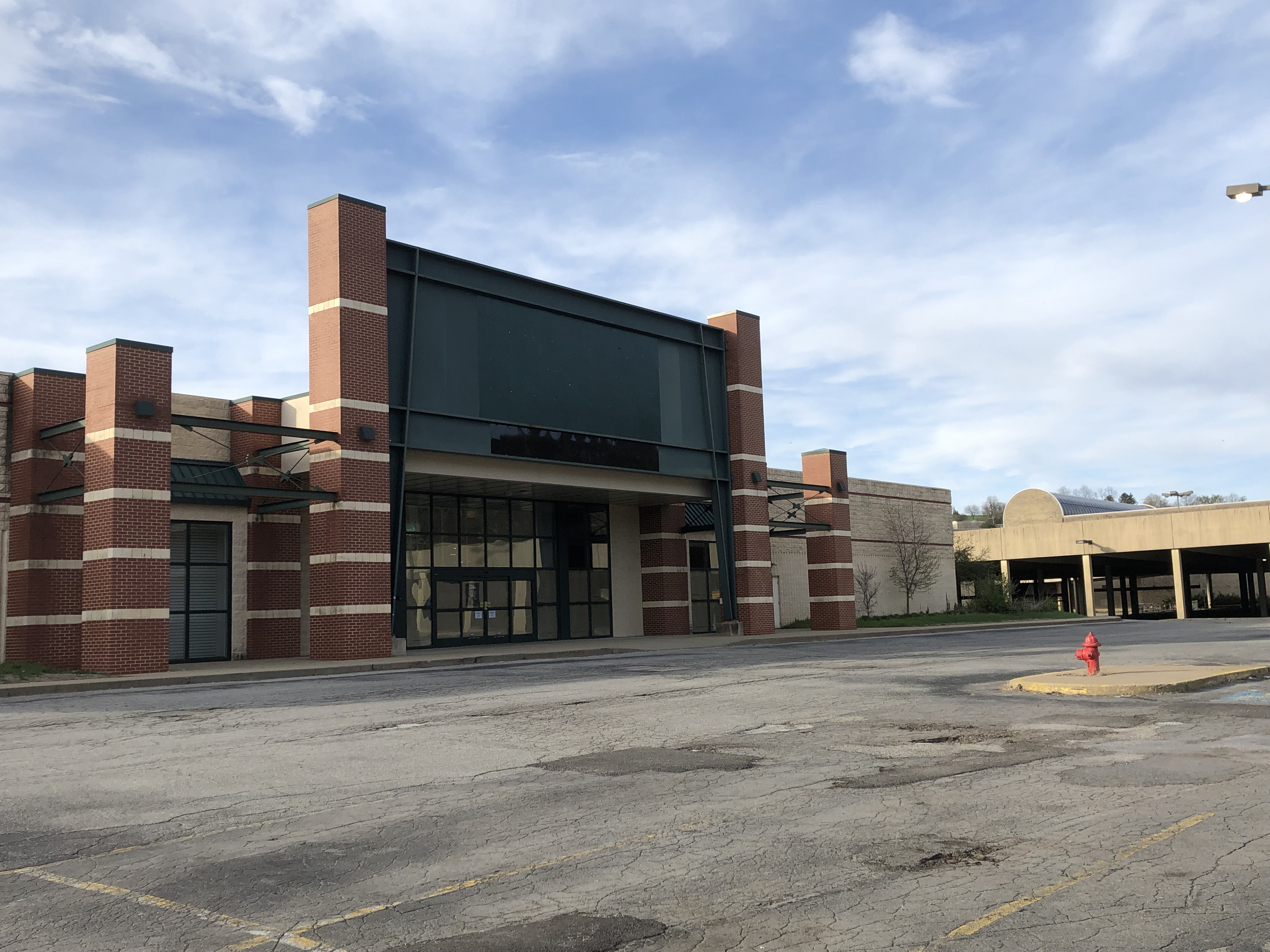
Former Dick's Sporting Goods location

Several contributing factors beginning in the late 1990s would result in the eventual decline of the mall. The biggest of these factors was the development of the Waterfront, which opened in nearby Homestead in 1999. The development had significantly expanded over the years, pulling shoppers away from Century III. South Hills Village, a smaller mall located only five miles to the west in Bethel Park, also underwent a major renovation, incorporating a large food court among its amenities.

Adding to the mall's woes, it lost its first anchor tenant in 1999 when Federated Department Stores closed the Lazarus store due to underperforming sales. Other major retailers, such as TJ Maxx 'n More and Wickes Furniture, also closed in 2003 and 2004, respectively. The former Wickes Furniture location was replaced by Dick's Sporting Goods, and TJ Maxx 'n More was filled with Steve and Barry's. As early as 2003, Century III Mall was about 20% vacant. By the late 2000s, several key retailers with locations at Century III Mall filed for bankruptcy, resulting in additional vacancies.

On July 18, 2005, Federated Department Stores purchased the May Department Stores Company. That purchase brought the Kaufmann's nameplate under Federated ownership. On September 9, 2006, Federated converted all former May Company regional department store nameplates, including Kaufmann's, into Macy's as part of a nationwide rebranding program, resulting in the Kaufmann's Furniture Gallery location to be returned once again to Federated Department Stores ownership and subsequently renamed as Macy's Furniture Gallery. Macy's Furniture only occupied the lower level.

The mall went up for sale in 2006 as Simon refocused on its top-performing properties, including South Hills Village and Ross Park Mall in Pittsburgh's northern suburbs. As the mall continued to languish, it affected the mall's assessment value, which stood at $66 million in April 2009, a 40 percent decrease from the previous $112 million in recent years. Prior to that, the mall was valued at $128 million. In June 2009, it decreased further to $58 million. The struggling mall was noted as being one of America's most endangered malls in a published report by U.S. News & World Report.

In April 2009, Macy's Furniture closed its Century III Mall location as a cost-cutting measure. Just prior to the closing, the fountain near the food court was drained and filled with mulch. In 2010, La Hacienda opened in the former Ruby Tuesday space, but it closed and was eventually replaced with Old Mexico Restaurant in 2015. Also during this time, certain sections of mall parking were permanently barricaded and blocked off to the general public, particularly in the parking deck, and the wing leading towards Macy's Furniture Gallery.

Simon Property Group defaulted on its $78 million loan for Century III Mall in August 2011, ultimately transferring ownership to its lenders. From September 2011 to May 2013, the mall was managed by Jones Lang LaSalle. On May 13, 2013, Century III Mall was purchased by Las Vegas-based Moonbeam Capital Investments LLC, a real estate investment trust which operates other shopping centers across the United States. In July 2014, a new double-decker carousel opened in the center court. Sears closed on December 7, 2014.

By 2015, the mall had become 60% vacant. On January 6, 2016, Macy's announced it would close its Century III store as part of a larger round of closings across the country. Macy's departure resulted in a mass exodus of retailers to leave the moribund mall. Its occupancy rate fell from 40 percent in January 2016 to 10 percent by December 2017. The once-sprawling food court, previously home to over 20 eateries, was now completely vacant after the last remaining food court tenant, Italian Village Pizza, closed on July 1, 2017.

The fast-fading mall continued to see more departures in 2018. Old Mexico, the last restaurant in the mall, closed in April, leaving the mall with no food tenant. In addition, the double-deck carousel was shut down and dismantled around the same time to be sent to an undisclosed location in Austin, Texas. Also in April, filming took place in the old Macy's Furniture Gallery wing for the Netflix original series Mindhunter. On June 1, a walk-through was held for former mall workers and patrons who wanted to tour the mall one last time due to a sheriff's sale. Over 200 people participated in the event.

On September 4, 2018, a sheriff's sale of the mall was postponed after Moonbeam Capital Investments filed for bankruptcy for the mall at the last minute. On January 1, 2019, Life Uniform, the last of the mall's chain tenants, departed from the Century III Mall.

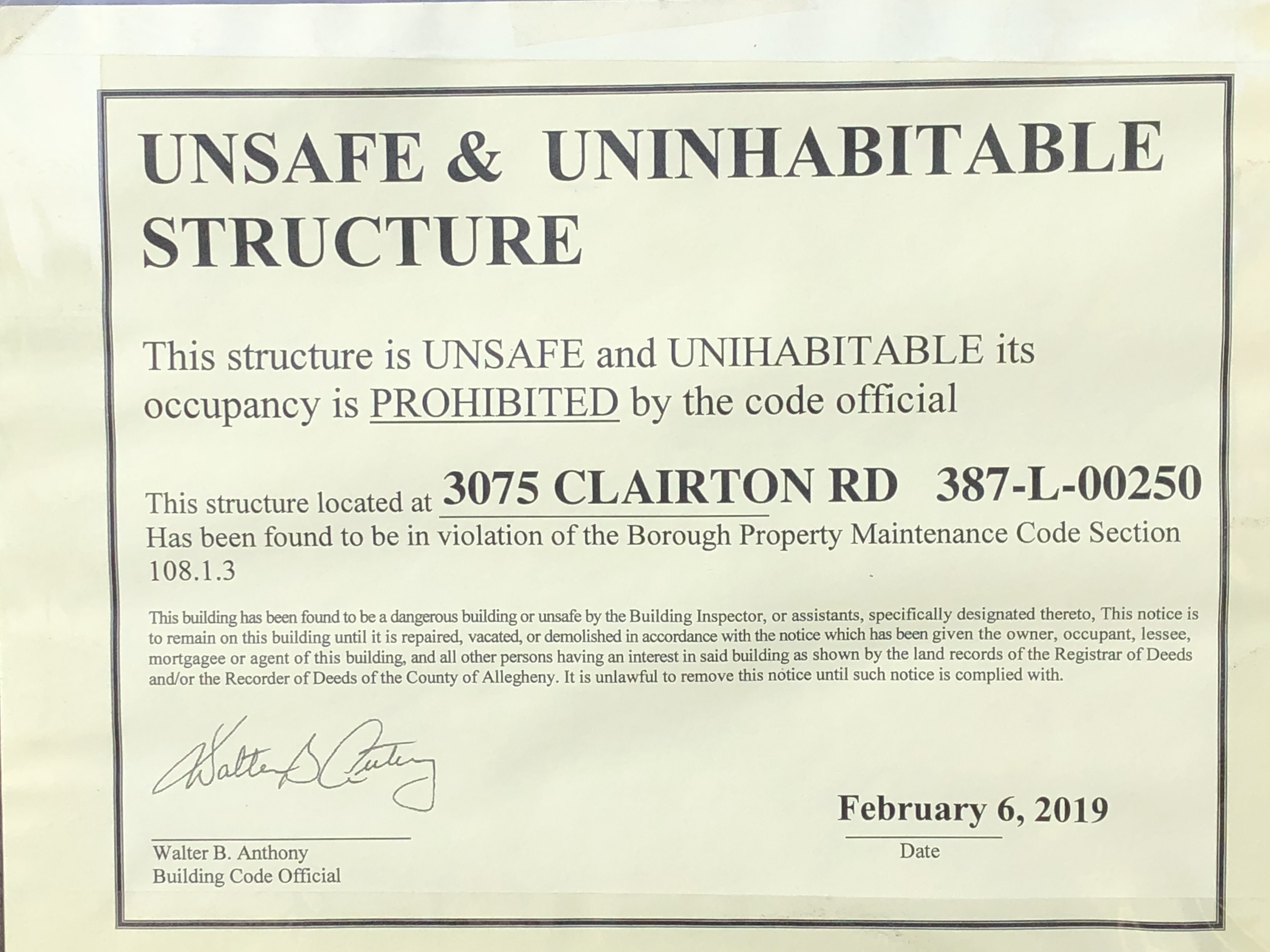
Century III Mall notice uninhabitable

On February 6, 2019, West Mifflin fire code deemed Century III Mall to be "unsafe, uninhabitable" due to numerous code violations, such as a non-functional sprinkler system, and no heat. On February 15, 2019, after 15 years, New Dimension Comics said that they were moving to The Waterfront beside Best Buy and Michael's. On February 12, 2019, Moonbeam's website said the mall was sold shortly after they took the sold banner off of their website. On February 16, 2019, the remaining mall tenants were issued eviction notices. JCPenney and Dick's Sporting Goods were the only remaining stores open at the time. On March 24, 2019, Dick's Sporting Goods announced that they were closing and that their last day would be March 30, 2019. This left one remaining original anchor, JCPenney.

On April 17, 2019, it was announced that a redevelopment plan was coming to the mall. By June, it was reported that the mall was boarded up and the future of the mall remained unclear. Owners indicated that the largely vacant mall would be torn down in March 2020 with the exception of JCPenney which would have remained open. In place, a mixed-use development was planned for the site. The plan called for incorporating retail, dining and entertainment attractions as well as a hotel, office space and residential units.

=== Post closure ===
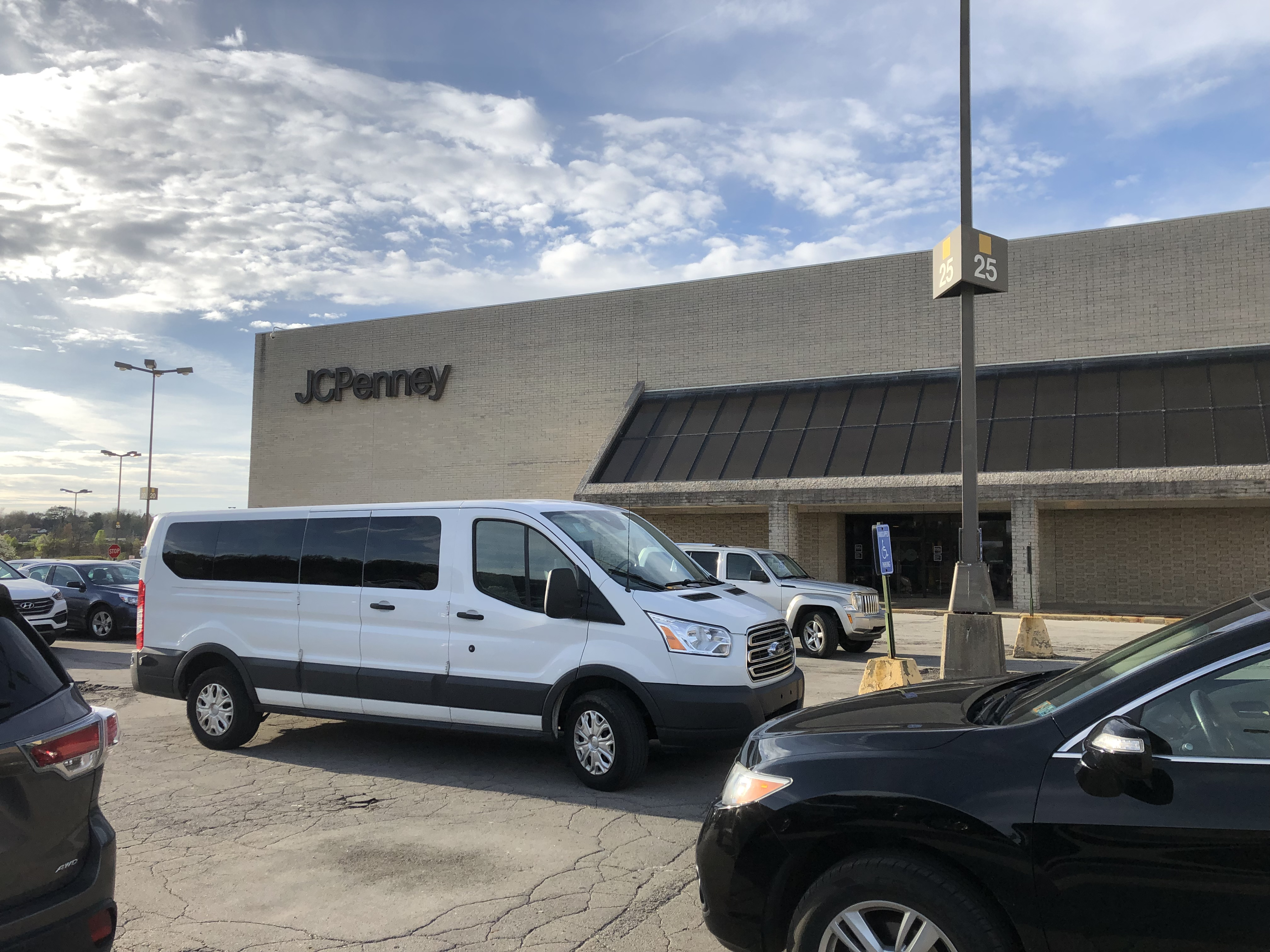
JCPenney, the last remaining store open, closed on October 26, 2020

Further information in the bankruptcy dockets revealed a timeline with various dates. The demolition of the mall was set to begin as early as March 2020 and last 6–12 months. Site remediation, which would include removing existing foundations as well as performing major excavation and bringing in massive amounts of fill to level the entirety of the mall site, would follow shortly after and take 18 months to complete. The first buildings would've been built in May 2022.

On August 7, 2019, a "motion to reject lease or executory contract of JCPenney Properties, Inc." was filed out by Debtor Century III Mall PA LLC, which is part of Moonbeam. By August 31, Moonbeam's website said that the mall was sold.

In August 2020, JCPenney announced that it would close over 150 stores, including the Century III Mall location. It closed on October 26, the last tenant of the mall.

Effective February 4, 2023, the Century III Mall park and ride closed due to the license agreement being terminated by mall management. PRT busses were rerouted as a result.

In March 2023, home improvement chain Menards reportedly declined on its offer to purchase Century III Mall.

As of early 2023, the water has been shut off in the section of the mall where it was previously kept running.

On April 11, 2023, a fire broke out in the mall on the third floor above the food court area at 6:15 am, the fire was later extinguished around 9:40 am. The cause of the fire was determined to be arson. Power to the mall was also shut off. In the week following the fire, all entrances and exits to the mall were barricaded, including the parking lot.

On June 3, 2023, a teenage boy fell through an opened roof hatch at the mall's former Macy's department store. The teenager was promptly taken to UPMC Children's Hospital of Pittsburgh in critical condition.

A hearing was held on June 14, 2023, to condemn the mall following numerous complaints from city officials. Moonbeam Capital CEO Shawl Pryor attended the hearing, receiving criticism for the property's decline since 2019. Pryor alleges that the company ceased funding towards maintenance in 2022 as the graffiti and damage was too expensive to clean.

On July 18, 2023, West Mifflin Borough Council voted 6-0 to condemn the abandoned Century III Mall.

On January 30, 2024, Allegheny County District Attorney Stephen A. Zappala Jr. filed criminal nuisance charges against the owners of the abandoned mall, calling it a "monument to blight." The Allegheny County Court of Common Pleas plans to seize the nearly 90-acre site and demolish the dilapidated structure within 60 to 90 days.

=== Demolition and redevelopment ===
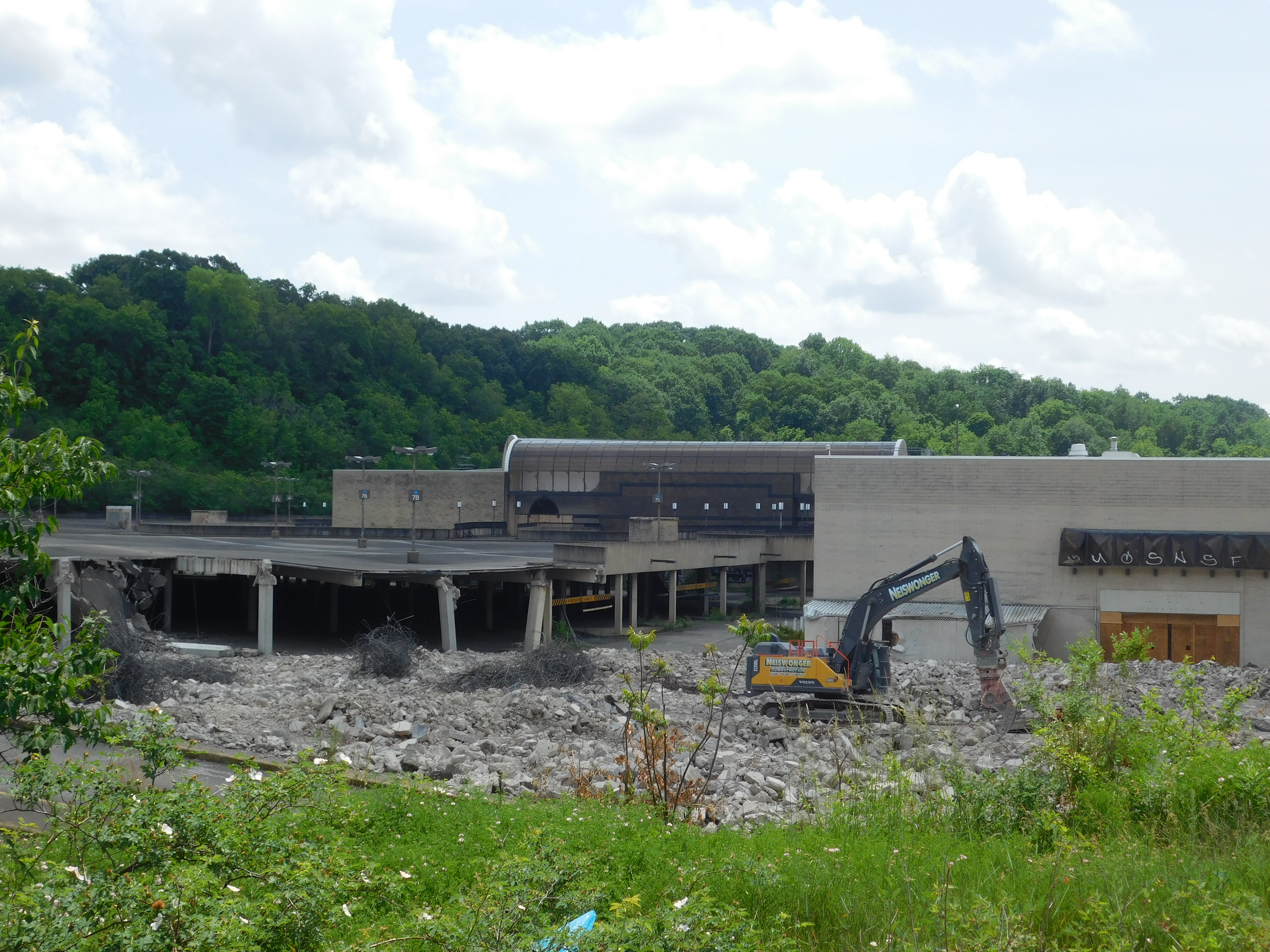
Century III Mall demolition in progress in May 2024

Demolition of the mall began on March 26, 2024, with the attached external parking structure, which took six months. After asbestos abatement, demolition of the building began the following September, with the JCPenney wing coming down completely in November. The mall interior was stripped, and salvaged material was removed throughout the remainder of the year.

Razing of the center court area began in January 2025. Demolition was forecasted to be completed sometime in 2026 due to the generally large size of the building, at a cost of $15 million. Demolition was completed on April 30, 2026.
