= Oliver B. Shallenberger =

American electrical engineer and inventor (1860–1898)

Oliver Blackburn Shallenberger
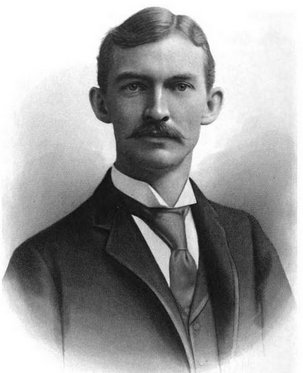
- Born: May 7, 1860; Rochester, Pennsylvania
- Died: January 23, 1898 (aged 37); Colorado
- Occupation: engineer
- Known for: electrical devices
- Spouse: Mary Woolstar
- Children: two
- Parent(s): Aaron T. Shallenberger; Mary (Bonbright) Shallenberger

Oliver Blackburn Shallenberger (May 7, 1860 – January 23, 1898) was an American electrical engineer and inventor. He is associated with electrical inventions related to alternating current. He is most noted for inventing the first successful alternating current (AC) electrical meter, the forerunner of the modern electric meter. This was critical to general acceptance of AC power.

== Early life ==
Shallenberger was born in Rochester, Pennsylvania, on May 7, 1860. His parents were Aaron T. Shallenberger and Mary (Bonbright) Shallenberger. He attended public schools of Rochester in Beaver County. He also went to Beaver College in Beaver County for a short time. He then attended the United States Naval Academy at Annapolis as a cadet engineer in 1877. William Shadrack Shallenberger, a member of Congress, was his uncle and helped him get into the Academy. He was head of a list of 126 candidates and took special interest in their physics courses. For the first year he was at the top of his class. During the second year in an accident he dislocated his wrist, broke an arm, and suffered vision impairment. He graduated in 1880 and was third of his class. Among the electricians and inventors that attended the Naval Academy around this same time were Frank J. Sprague, Dr. Louis Duncan, W. F. C. Hasson, and Gilbert Wilkes.

== Mid life and career ==
Shallenberger then served the customary two year commitment serving on a government ship, assigned to the U.S. flagship Lancaster in the Mediterranean. He witnessed the Bombardment of Alexandria. He returned to the United States in 1883. Shallenberger then joined the Union Switch and Signal Company of Pittsburgh in 1884 under the management of George Westinghouse. The company was organizing an electric light department using alternating current and he became an electrician. Shallenberger ran the experiments of an alternating current apparatus which had been imported from Europe by Westinghouse. This research was the foundation for the organization of the Westinghouse Electric Company. He was appointed Chief Electrician and continued that position when the company in 1886 became the Westinghouse Electric and Manufacturing Company.

Shallenberger was elected an associate member of the American Institute of Electrical Engineers in 1888. He was one of the promoters of the Rochester Electric Company of Rochester, Pennsylvania, that formed in 1890. In 1891, poor health required him to resign from the company but continued as a Consulting Electrician. In 1897 he organized the Colorado Electric Power Company, becoming its President for the rest of his life. He settled permanently in Colorado Springs in 1897. Shallenberger became well known for his electrical knowledge and was recognized as a worldwide authority on electricity.

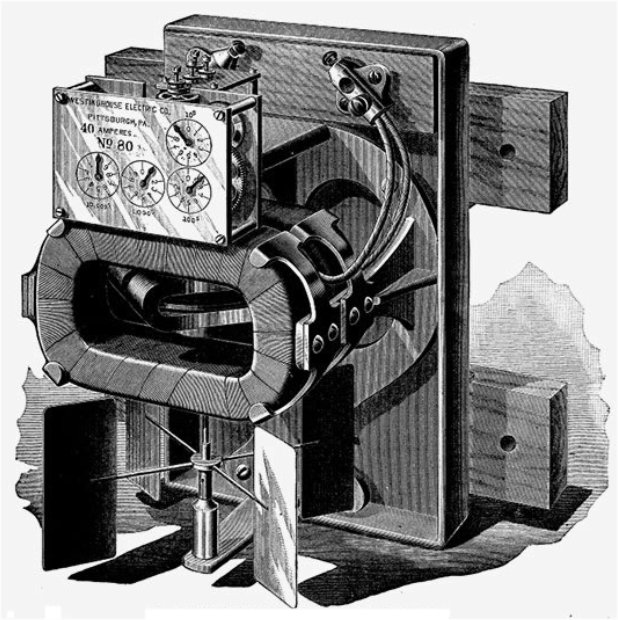
Shallenberger's Meter

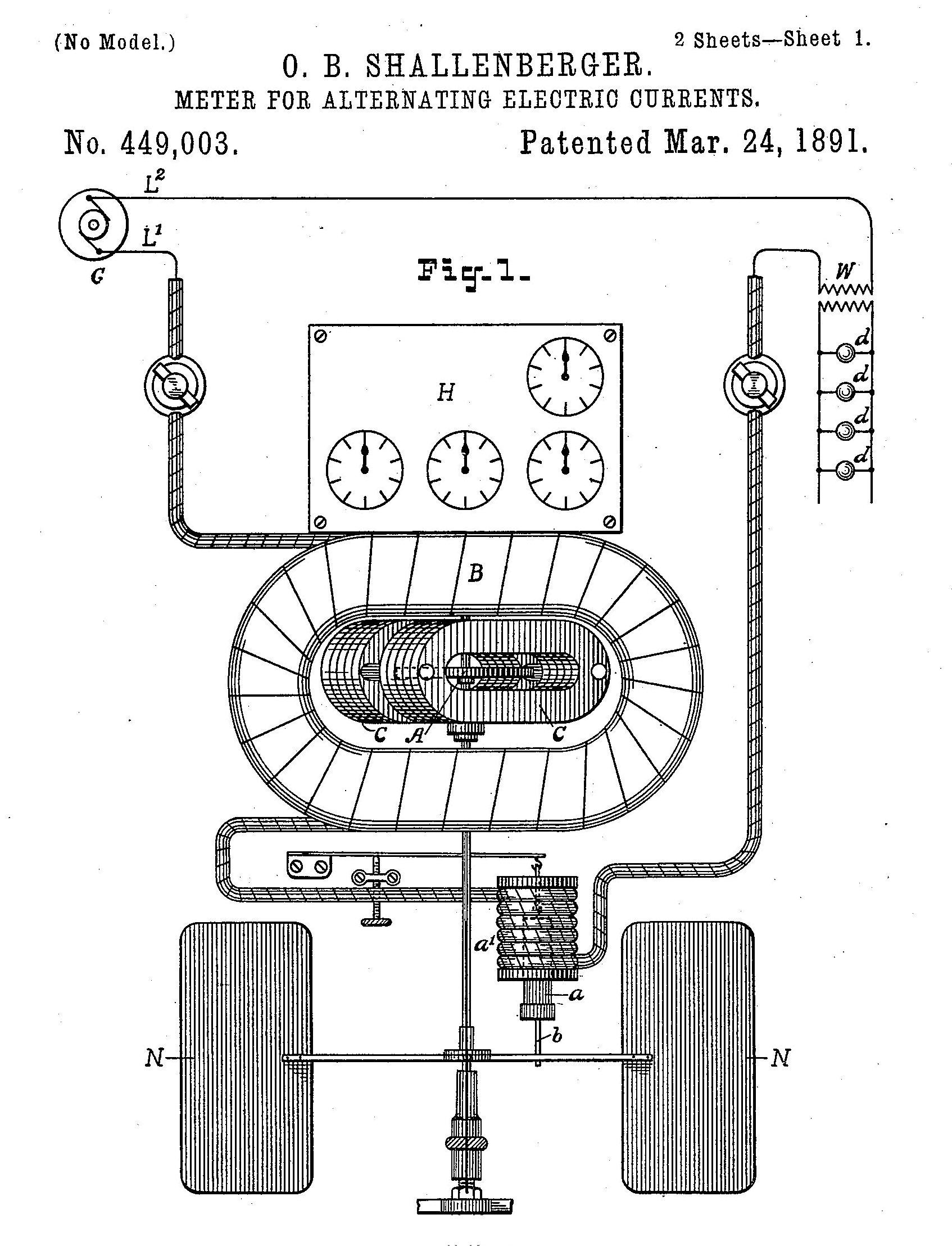
Patent of Shallenberger's Meter

== Inventions and innovations ==
Shallenberger did much in electrical experimentation and original research. He invented a street-lighting system in which each of a series of incandescent lamps is connected to specially designed transformers so that upon the interruption of the current of any lamp, the normal current is allowed to flow through the corresponding transformer to the remaining lamps without a power surge. It was patent US740189. The design and construction supervision of these specially designed transformer systems were by him. He also was the first in the United States to innovate a method of connecting alternating current generators in a parallel circuit. Shallenberger was the first to demonstrate in the United States, with the assistance of George Westinghouse, the safety of alternating current and he was primarily responsible for the general usage of that type of current over that of direct current. Through his inventions he showed that the use of alternating current electricity was more efficient and safer to use than direct current.

Shallenberger, through a research laboratory accident, innovated a device that led to the invention in 1888 of an induction meter, a paramount apparatus of the Westinghouse alternating current system. One day when he was experimenting on a new type of lamp a spring fell off and landed inside the lamp on a small edge of the holding structure. Before it got replaced by a co-worker Shallenberger observed that the spring rotated by some sort of electromagnetic force. He then conceived the idea that perhaps this force field could be used to turn some small wheels in such a way that they could measure electricity. Shallenberger developed that force field concept into a mechanical device, an ampere-hour meter, that could measure alternating current usage. He patented it under number US449003 A. It was a type of motor.

Shallenberger soon refined his ampere-hour meter into a true watthour meter, although his model was very bulky (reportedly exceeding 40 pounds in weight). After Shallenberger's passing, an improved, lightweight model (12 pounds) was introduced by others at Westinghouse, and which has been refined over time into what is today the modern electric meter for recording and indicating watthours for the measure of electric energy consumed by a customer. His electric meter was used by the British Government Board of Trade as the primary instrument for the measurement of electric current. His electric meter for measuring alternating current electricity was known worldwide by the end of the nineteenth century. Securing accurate payment for electricity as a commodity had immense practical import. Shallenberger's electric meter invention was not the first to address the need for payment for electricity. Thomas Edison initially invoked a ‘per lamp’ surcharge in 1882. This gave way to a meter that used electrolytic jars that chemically measured zinc transfers and inferred electric usage. In 1888, Elihu Thomson patented a walking-beam meter which was later disparagingly labeled as a Rube Goldberg-styled device, which was soon followed by his far simpler (and more reliable) Thomson Recording Wattmeter.

Shallenberger's simple AC motor (as it was later identified by Nikola Tesla) revolutionized electric meters. It operated on alternating current of 133 cycles per second. It was accurate and an important component of Westinghouse's AC electrical system. The meter sold 120,000 units within ten years. It enabled billing by the ampere hour, combining measures of current and charge. "Coulomb motor meters" are those that measure electric quantity used. Therefore, power companies that used Shallenberger's meters charged by the energy consumed.

== Personal life ==
Shallenberger married Mary Woolslair on November 27, 1889. They had a son (John W.) and daughter (Gertrude). John W. graduated from Yale University in 1912.

Shallenberger traveled through several major European cities in 1889 to observe their electrical systems. He died of tuberculosis in Colorado on January 23, 1898. He is buried at Beaver County, Pennsylvania.
