= Kris Griffin =

American football player (born 1981)

No. 53, 54
- Position: Linebacker

Personal information
- Born: May 27, 1981 (age 45); Rochester, Pennsylvania, U.S.
- Listed height: 6 ft 3 in (1.91 m)
- Listed weight: 245 lb (111 kg)

Career information
- College: IUP
- NFL draft: 2005: undrafted

Career history
- Kansas City Chiefs (2005–2006); → Hamburg Sea Devils (2006); Cleveland Browns (2007–2008); Jacksonville Jaguars (2010)*; Las Vegas Locomotives (2010–2011)
- * Offseason or practice squad member only

Awards and highlights
- UFL champion (2010)

Career NFL statistics
- Total tackles: 40
- Fumble recoveries: 2
- Stats at Pro Football Reference

Kristofor Lawrence Griffin (born May 27, 1981) is an American former professional football player who was a linebacker in the National Football League (NFL). He was signed by the Kansas City Chiefs as an undrafted free agent in 2005. He played college football for the IUP Crimson Hawks. His younger brother Kirby Griffin played in the Arena Football League (AFL).

He was also a member of the Cleveland Browns, Jacksonville Jaguars and Las Vegas Locomotives.

== Early life ==
Griffin attended Rochester Area High School where he played both at safety and wide receiver. He was a key member of the team's undefeated 15-0 PIAA Class A State Championship team in 1998.

== College career ==
He played in 18 contests at Geneva College, producing 109 tackles, 24 tackles for loss, 7 sacks and 8 interceptions. Griffin then transferred to Indiana University of Pennsylvania, where he played in 22 games, recording 152 tackles, 38 tackles for loss, 12 sacks, 11 interceptions and seven passes defensed. He majored in sports administration.

== Professional career ==
=== 2005 ===
Griffin was signed by the Kansas City Chiefs as an undrafted rookie free agent. He made his NFL debut at the Denver Broncos on September 26. During his first season he played in eight games and made three tackles.

=== 2006 ===
He was allocated to NFL Europe and played for the Hamburg Sea Devils where he made ten appearances and nine starts. During his time there he made 41 tackles. When he returned to training camp for the Chiefs he established himself within the special teams. He played in all 16 games and made 22 special teams tackles.

=== 2007 ===
On May 23, 2007, NFL Network reported that Griffin was released by the Chiefs. He later signed with the Cleveland Browns. He played in twelve games and recorded a total of 14 tackles.

=== 2008 ===
Played in 10 games for the Cleveland Browns, recording a total of 7 tackles.

=== 2010 ===
Griffin was signed by the Jacksonville Jaguars on August 8.
