= Kirby Griffin =

American football player (born 1983)

No. 31
- Position: Fullback

Personal information
- Born: June 16, 1983 (age 43); Rochester, Pennsylvania, U.S.
- Listed height: 6 ft 1 in (1.85 m)
- Listed weight: 280 lb (127 kg)

Career information
- College: California (PA)
- NFL draft: 2009: undrafted

Career history
- Wilkes-Barre/Scranton Pioneers (2009); Jacksonville Sharks (2010–2011); Pittsburgh Power (2013)

Awards and highlights
- ArenaBowl champion (2011)

Career AFL statistics
- Rushing attempts: 159
- Rushing yards: 417
- Receptions: 13
- Receiving yards: 127
- Total touchdowns: 37
- Stats at ArenaFan.com

Kirby Griffin (born June 16, 1983) is an American former professional football player. He played on the defensive line for California University of Pennsylvania. He was signed as a free agent by the Jacksonville Sharks in 2009.

Griffin's older brother, Kris Griffin, is a former NFL linebacker.
