= Rochester Area School District =

School district in Pennsylvania

Coordinates: 40.70785°N 80.27877°W

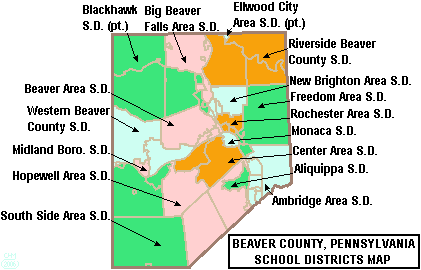

Address
- 540 Reno Street Rochester, Beaver County, Pennsylvania, 15074; United States

District information
- Type: Public
- Grades: K–12
- NCES District ID: 4220460

Students and staff
- Students: 688 (2020–2021)
- Teachers: 66.67 (on an FTE basis)
- Staff: 74.03 (on an FTE basis)
- Student–teacher ratio: 10.32:1

Other information
- Website: http://rasd.org/

The Rochester Area School District is a small, urban public school district in Beaver County, Pennsylvania. It serves the boroughs of Rochester and East Rochester, and the township of Rochester Township. Rochester Area School District encompasses approximately 5 square miles (13 km^{2}). According to 2000 federal census data, it serves a resident population of 8,075 people. By 2010, the district's population had declined to 7,046. The educational attainment levels for the school district population (25 years old and over) were 88.3% high school graduates and 14.3% college graduates. The district is one of the 500 public school districts of Pennsylvania.

According to the Pennsylvania Budget and Policy Center, 66% of the district's pupils lived at 185% or below the Federal Poverty Level as shown by their eligibility for the federal free or reduced price school meal programs in 2012. In 2013, the Pennsylvania Department of Education, reported that 11 students in the Rochester Area School District were homeless. In 2009, Rochester Area School District residents' per capita income was $16,567, while the median family income was $40,386. In the Commonwealth, the median family income was $49,501 and the United States median family income was $49,445, in 2010. In Beaver County, the median household income was $49,217. In 2014, the median household income in the USA was $53,700.

Rochester Area School District operates two schools: Rochester Jr-Sr High School (7th-12th) and Rochester Elementary School (K–6th). High school students may choose to attend the Beaver County Career Technology Center for training in the construction and mechanical trades and other careers. The Beaver Valley Intermediate Unit IU27 provides the district with a wide variety of services like: specialized education for disabled students; state mandated training on recognizing and reporting child abuse; speech and visual disability services; criminal background check processing for prospective employees and professional development for staff and faculty.

== Extracurriculars ==
The Rochester Area School District offers a variety of clubs, activities and an extensive sports program.

=== Sports ===
The district funds:

Varsity

Boys

- Baseball - A
- Basketball- A
- Bowling - AAAA
- Football - A
- Golf - AA
- Track and field - AA

Girls

- Basketball - AA
- Bowling - AAAA
- Cheerleading - 7th and 8th grade
- Softball - A
- Tennis - AA
- Track and field - AA
- Volleyball - A

Middle school sports

Boys

- Basketball
- Football

Girls

- Basketball
- Volleyball

According to PIAA directory July 2015
