= Rochester, Pennsylvania =

Borough in Pennsylvania, US

- Borough
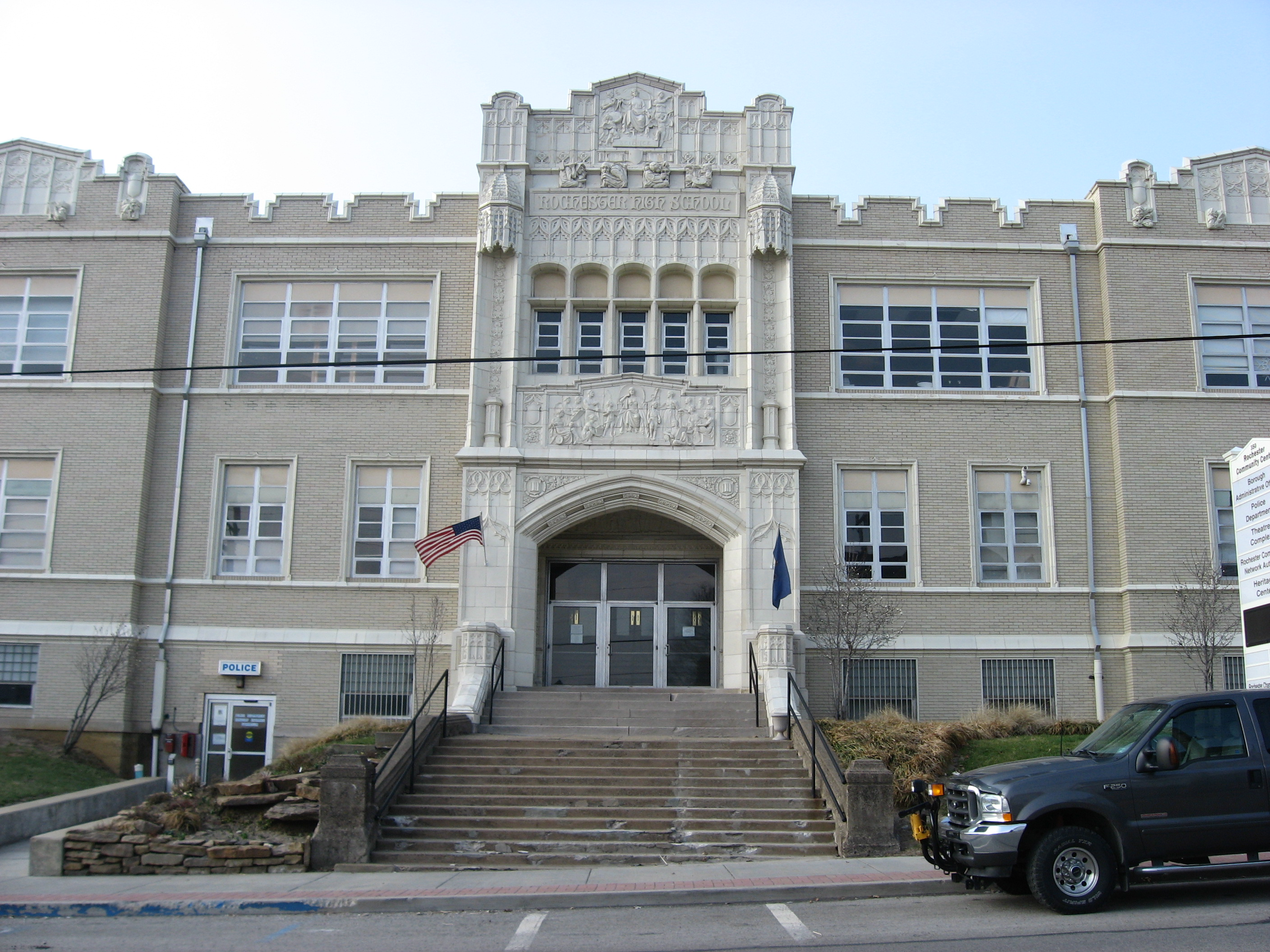
- Borough Administrative Offices
- Interactive map of Rochester, Pennsylvania
- Location within Pennsylvania Location within the United States
- Coordinates: 40°42′11″N 80°17′0″W
- Country: United States
- State: Pennsylvania
- County: Beaver
- Settled: 1799; 227 years ago
- Incorporated: 1849; 177 years ago

Government
  - Type: Mayor–council
  - Mayor: Keith Jackson

Area
  - Total: 0.73 sq mi (1.89 km^{2})
  - Land: 0.59 sq mi (1.52 km^{2})
  - Water: 0.14 sq mi (0.36 km^{2})
- Elevation: 810 ft (250 m)

Population (2020)
  - Total: 3,472
  - Density: 5,903.9/sq mi (2,279.52/km^{2})
- Time zone: UTC-5 (Eastern (EST))
  - Summer (DST): UTC-4 (EDT)
- Zip Code: 15074
- Area codes: 724, 878
- FIPS code: 42-65392
- Website: https://www.rochesterpa.org/

Rochester is a borough in Beaver County, Pennsylvania, United States. It is located at the confluence of the Beaver and Ohio rivers 25 miles (40 km) northwest of Pittsburgh. The population was 3,472 at the 2020 census. It is part of the Pittsburgh metropolitan area.

Like many towns around Pittsburgh, Rochester was a former industrial hub, home to the H. C. Fry Glass Company, and was a major junction on the Pennsylvania Railroad. Rochester has been a background for films, including the 1986 movie Gung Ho, the 1996 movie Kingpin, and the 2000 movie Wonder Boys.

== History ==
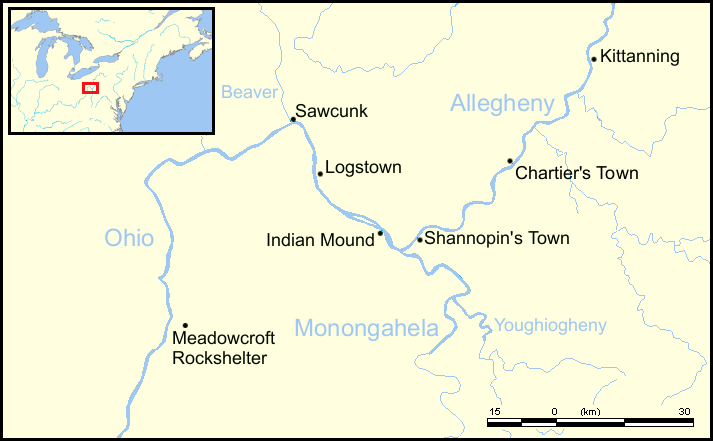
Location of Sawcunk at present-day Rochester

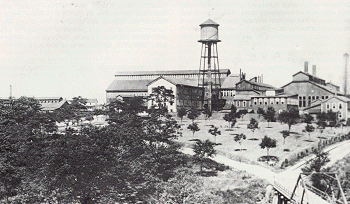
H. C. Fry Glass Factory in Rochester, c. 1910

What eventually became Rochester was originally a Lenape village called Sawcunk. The area was settled in 1799 in what was then the American frontier by white settlers and was known as East Bridgewater, Fairport, and Beaver Point. The borough adopted the name Rochester in 1834 when a local businessman who did regular business in Pittsburgh decided to christen his home with the name Rochester so he could have a unique name to stamp his goods; the borough was officially incorporated as such in 1849.

Many of the streets that run through Rochester today had different names based on wild animals. Virginia Avenue and Adams Street—two of the city's main thoroughfares via Pennsylvania Route 68—were once known as Fox Lane and Tiger Lane, respectively. Deer Lane, which still exists today, is the last remnant of the original naming scheme for the street grid in the borough.

Rochester is where Henry Clay Fry and his associates formed a glass manufacturing company following Fry's return from the American Civil War. In 1897 the Rochester Tumbler Company (as the company was known) became the National Glass Company of Rochester. The company helped to introduce pressed glass production to America, pressing the glass into a mold where previously the technique of cut glass had been to blow it by hand. At its height, the National Glass Company of Rochester employed over 1000 people but its bankruptcy during the Great Depression began a long decline in the town's population which continues up to today.

Rochester was a railroad junction for the Pennsylvania Railroad and sat along the railroad's mainline from the Eastern United States to Chicago.

== Geography ==
Rochester is at 40°42′11″N 80°17′0″W (40.703146, -80.283420). According to the U.S. Census Bureau, the borough has a total area of 0.7 square miles (1.8 km^{2}), of which 0.6 square miles (1.6 km^{2}) is land and 0.1 square miles (0.26 km^{2}) (17.14%) is water.

== Demographics ==
Historical population
Census	Pop.	Note	%±
1850	993		—
1860	1,376		38.6%
1870	2,091		52.0%
1880	2,552		22.0%
1890	3,649		43.0%
1900	4,688		28.5%
1910	5,993		27.8%
1920	6,957		16.1%
1930	7,726		11.1%
1940	7,441		−3.7%
1950	7,197		−3.3%
1960	5,952		−17.3%
1970	4,819		−19.0%
1980	4,759		−1.2%
1990	4,156		−12.7%
2000	4,014		−3.4%
2010	3,657		−8.9%
2020	3,472		−5.1%
2021 (est.)	3,437	▼	−1.0%
U.S. Decennial Census

=== 2020 census ===
As of the 2020 census, Rochester had a population of 3,472. The median age was 39.6 years. 19.7% of residents were under the age of 18 and 17.3% of residents were 65 years of age or older. For every 100 females there were 97.5 males, and for every 100 females age 18 and over there were 94.8 males age 18 and over.

100.0% of residents lived in urban areas, while 0.0% lived in rural areas.

There were 1,537 households in Rochester, of which 24.7% had children under the age of 18 living in them. Of all households, 26.3% were married-couple households, 27.4% were households with a male householder and no spouse or partner present, and 34.7% were households with a female householder and no spouse or partner present. About 40.0% of all households were made up of individuals and 13.0% had someone living alone who was 65 years of age or older.

There were 1,838 housing units, of which 16.4% were vacant. The homeowner vacancy rate was 2.7% and the rental vacancy rate was 10.7%.

Racial composition as of the 2020 census
Race	Number	Percent
White	2,540	73.2%
Black or African American	565	16.3%
American Indian and Alaska Native	9	0.3%
Asian	9	0.3%
Native Hawaiian and Other Pacific Islander	1	0.0%
Some other race	48	1.4%
Two or more races	300	8.6%
Hispanic or Latino (of any race)	90	2.6%

=== 2000 census ===
As of the 2000 census, there were 4,014 people, 1,732 households, and 971 families residing in the borough. The population density was 6,861.5 inhabitants per square mile (2,649.2/km^{2}). There were 1,900 housing units at an average density of 1,243.4 inhabitants/km^{2} (3,247.8 inhabitants/mi^{2}). The racial makeup of the borough was 83.81% White, 13.38% African American, 0.22% Native American, 0.20% Asian, 0.57% from other races, and 1.82% from two or more races. Hispanic or Latino of any race were 0.92% of the population.

There were 1,732 households, out of which 25.6% had children under the age of 18 living with them, 37.3% were married couples living together, 14.7% had a female householder with no husband present, and 43.9% were non-families. 37.4% of all households were made up of individuals, and 14.7% had someone living alone who was 65 years of age or older. The average household size was 2.22 and the average family size was 2.97.

In the borough, the population was spread out, with 21.6% under the age of 18, 9.1% from 18 to 24, 29.0% from 25 to 44, 22.3% from 45 to 64, and 17.9% who were 65 years of age or older. The median age was 39 years. For every 100 females there were 85.5 males. For every 100 females age 18 and over, there were 80.3 males.

The median income for a household in the borough was $30,970, and the median income for a family was $39,805. Males had a median income of $28,906 versus $21,576 for females. The per capita income for the borough was $15,359. About 7.2% of families and 12.2% of the population were below the poverty line, including 14.4% of those under age 18 and 11.1% of those age 65 or over.

== Education ==
Children in Rochester are served by the Rochester Area School District. The current schools serving Rochester are:

- Rochester Elementary School – grades K–5
- Rochester Middle School – grades 6–8
- Rochester Area High School – grades 9–12

== Notable people ==
- Christina Aguilera, Grammy award-winning pop music singer
- Barney Cable, NBA basketball player 1958–1964
- Mickey Davis, basketball player
- Tony Dorsett, Pro Football Hall of Fame running back
- Mark Grater, Major League Baseball player
- Juliet Greer, educator, college dean
- Kirby Griffin, American football player
- Kris Griffin, Kansas City Chiefs and Cleveland Browns linebacker
- Babe Parilli, Vito "Babe" Parilli, All Star quarterback of the Boston Patriots' "Team of the 1960s"
- Major General Joseph Henry Pendleton, war veteran after whom Marine Corps Base Camp Pendleton was named
- Oliver B. Shallenberger, electrical engineer and inventor
- Mark Vlasic, American football quarterback
- Lauryn Williams, 2005 100m World champion sprinter and Olympic gold medalist and silver medalist

== See also ==
- List of cities and towns along the Ohio River
