= Bunola, Pennsylvania =

Unincorporated community in Pennsylvania, US

- Unincorporated community
- Location within Pennsylvania
- Coordinates: 40°14′14″N 79°57′02″W
- Country: United States
- State: Pennsylvania
- County: Allegheny
- Elevation: 794 ft (242 m)
- Time zone: UTC-5 (Eastern (EST))
  - Summer (DST): UTC-4 (EDT)
- ZIP code: 15020
- Area code: 412
- GNIS feature ID: 1170694

Bunola is an unincorporated community in Allegheny County, Pennsylvania, United States. The community is located along the Monongahela River, 14.2 miles (22.9 km) south of Pittsburgh. Bunola has a post office with ZIP code 15020, which opened on May 26, 1888.

== Demographics ==
Historical population
| Census | Pop. | Note | %± |
|---|---|---|---|
| 2023 (est.) | 167 |

The United States Census Bureau defined Bunola as a census designated place in 2023.
