= Rochester Area High School (Pennsylvania) =

Coordinates: 40.708°N 80.279°W

Location
- 540 Reno Street; Rochester, Pennsylvania 15074; United States

Information
- Type: Public, Coeducational high school
- Established: 1890
- School district: Rochester Area School District
- Principal: Michael Damon
- Teaching staff: 17.45 (FTE)
- Grades: 9-12
- Enrollment: 227 (2023-2024)
- Student to teacher ratio: 13.01
- Colors: Navy and White
- Athletics conference: Western Pennsylvania Interscholastic Athletic League
- Team name: Rams
- Rival: South Side High School
- Website: www.rasd.org

Rochester High School is a public high school in Rochester, Pennsylvania, United States. It is the only high school in the Rochester Area School District. Athletic teams compete as the Rochester Rams in the Western Pennsylvania Interscholastic Athletic League.

== Campus ==
Rochester High School is housed in a K-12, all-grade academic complex. The elementary school is separated from the middle and high schools by a common area that includes the district library, a little theater and several cafeterias. This design enables faculty, administration and students to interact with one another on a daily basis.

== Extracurriculars ==
Rochester High School offers a wide variety of clubs, activities and an interscholastic sports program.

=== Clubs and activities ===
Rochester Area High School offers many extracurricular activities to students. The most popular activity is the Cultural Diversity Club, which sponsors an annual Cultural Diversity fair. Other club offerings include "Hometown Hi-Q", Bowling Club, Student Council, Students of Service, Art Club, and National Honor Society.

=== Music ===
Rochester Area High School is well known for being the first high school in the United States to show the musical My Fair Lady in 1964. The musical was directed by Chorus and Musical director Mr. Philip Inman. It was reported that the high school auditorium was standing-room only for the musical's opening night.

=== Athletics ===
Rochester Area is well known for its success in athletics, particularly football. The high school football team won the WPIAL Class A Championship in 1916, 1991, 1992, 1998, 2000, 2001, 2002, and 2004, and went on to win the PIAA Class A Championship in 1998, 2000, and 2001. The 1998 season is best remembered, as the team finished the season undefeated 15-0. Mr. Gene Matsook has served as head coach since 2000, and his brother, Daniel Matsook, served as the head coach from 1985–1999. Matsook is now the superintendent of the Central Valley School District. The Matsooks have established a well known football legacy throughout the state of Pennsylvania.

Rochester Area, whose mascot is the Rams, shares a rivalry with another small Beaver County school - South Side Beaver High School. Since both schools use the ram as a mascot, the annual football game is known as the "Battle of the Rams".

The school is known as the home to Olympic track star Lauryn Williams, who set many school and state records in track.

The school also won the 1983 PIAA Class AA Men's Basketball Championship.

==== Battle of the Bridge ====
The football team played in one of the most notable rivalries in Western Pennsylvania high school football with rival Monaca High School, located in Monaca just across the Ohio River. The two schools played in the annual Battle of the Bridge, in which the winner had their name listed first on the Rochester-Monaca Bridge for a year. The rivalry was so well known that it was featured at the Western Pennsylvania Sports Museum.

The rivalry also led to the two schools meeting in the playoffs on several occasions. In 1998 and 2000, both schools met at Three Rivers Stadium to determine the WPIAL champion, with Rochester winning both times. When the two teams did meet in the postseason, the Rochester-Monaca Bridge was not on the line, as that year's results were already determined.

On occasion, the football rivalry would spill into other sports. In 2001, the two schools met in Rochester for the first of two men's basketball matchups for the season between the two schools. Near the end of the game, a fight erupted in the stands, with several people arrested. To prevent another incident for the second game at Monaca, only school administrators were allowed at that game, as fans, cheerleaders, and even parents of the athletes were not allowed at the game. Fans were allowed at future games after that season.

With the merger of the Monaca School District and Center Area School Districts into the new Central Valley School District, the year 2009 marked the final season that Monaca High School existed. Consequently, 2009 was the last season in with a "Battle of the Bridge" game. This contest took place on Saturday, October 31, 2009 and the Rams won 28-0. The game was given national attention by the Great American Rivalry Series, with Rochester Stadium reportedly having a standing-room only attendance of 11,000 fans witnessing the final game of a great rivalry. Since the end of the 2009-2010 school year, the permanent name of the bridge is "Rochester-Monaca" on the Rochester side and "Monaca-Rochester" on the Monaca side.

== Notable alumni ==
- Babe Parilli - 1948 graduate, former American Football League player and Arena Football League coach
- Kris Griffin - 1999 graduate, linebacker of the Kansas City Chiefs and Cleveland Browns, member of the undefeated 1998 state championship football team.
- Lauryn Williams - 2001 graduate, Olympic silver medalist in the 2004 Olympic Games in Athens. Competed in the 2008 Olympic Games in Beijing.
- Derek Moye - 2007 graduate, wide receiver for Penn State 2007–2011. Moye was signed to the practice squad of the Pittsburgh Steelers in 2012 and made the starting roster in 2013.
