= East Rochester, Pennsylvania =

Borough in Pennsylvania, US

- Borough
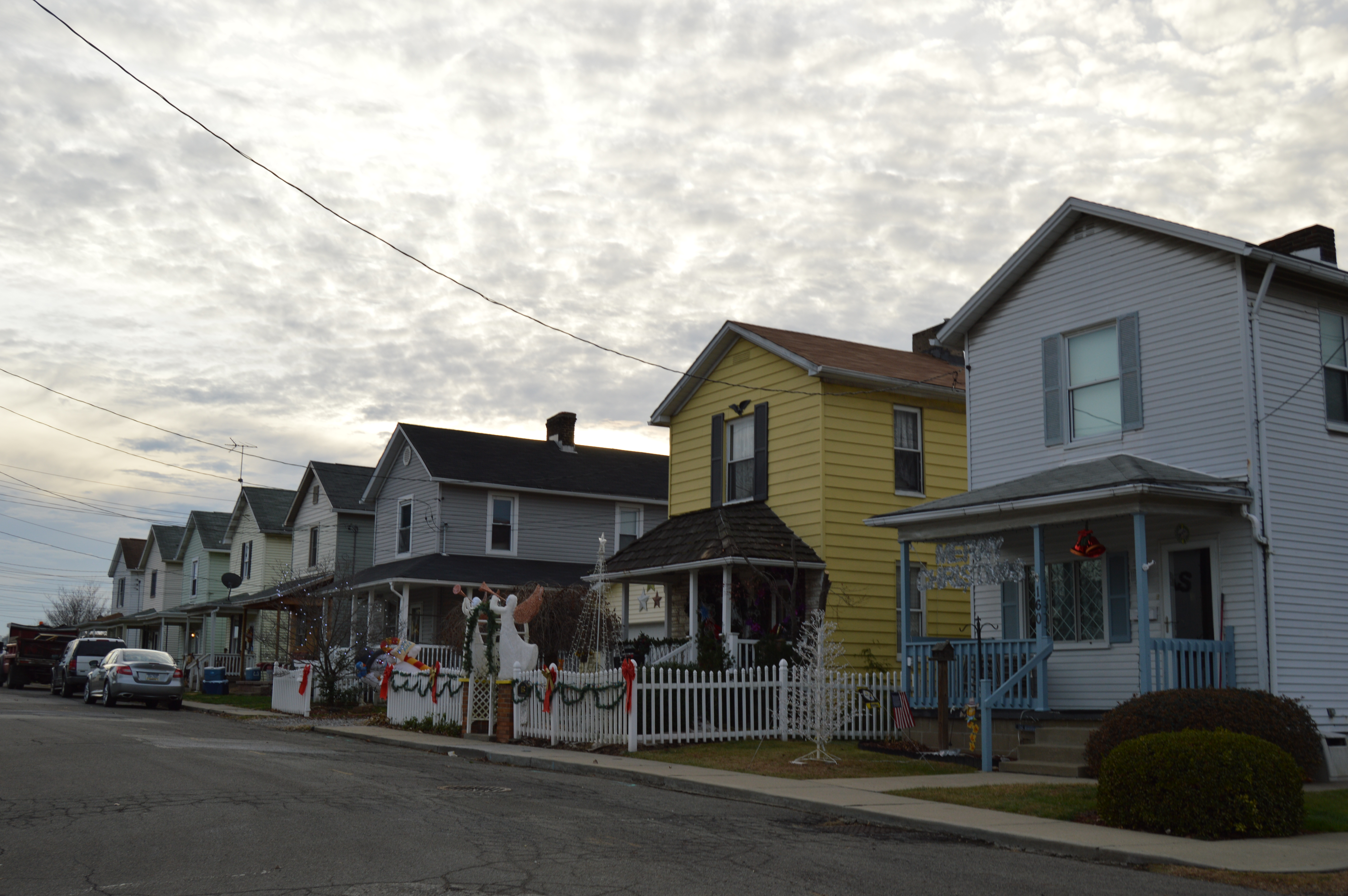
- Houses on Foster Avenue
- Interactive map of East Rochester, Pennsylvania
- Location within Pennsylvania Location within the United States
- Coordinates: 40°41′53″N 80°16′05″W
- Country: United States
- State: Pennsylvania
- County: Beaver
- Settled: 1888
- Incorporated: 1908

Government
  - Type: Borough Council

Area
  - Total: 0.46 sq mi (1.18 km^{2})
  - Land: 0.37 sq mi (0.95 km^{2})
  - Water: 0.093 sq mi (0.24 km^{2})
- Elevation: 810 ft (250 m)

Population (2020)
  - Total: 565
  - Density: 1,544.4/sq mi (596.31/km^{2})
- Time zone: UTC-5 (Eastern (EST))
  - Summer (DST): UTC-4 (EDT)
- ZIP code: 15074
- Area code: 724
- FIPS code: 42-21752
- Website: https://eastrochesterpa.com/

East Rochester is a borough in central Beaver County, Pennsylvania, United States, along the Ohio River. The population was 565 at the 2020 census. It is part of the Pittsburgh metropolitan area.

== Geography ==
East Rochester is located at 40°41′53″N 80°16′5″W (40.698166, −80.268032).

According to the United States Census Bureau, the borough has a total area of 0.5 square miles (1.3 km^{2}), of which 0.4 square miles (1.0 km^{2}) is land and 0.1 square miles (0.26 km^{2}) (14.89%) is water.

== Demographics ==
Historical population
Census	Pop.	Note	%±
1910	718		—
1920	720		0.3%
1930	715		−0.7%
1940	706		−1.3%
1950	985		39.5%
1960	1,025		4.1%
1970	920		−10.2%
1980	789		−14.2%
1990	672		−14.8%
2000	623		−7.3%
2010	567		−9.0%
2020	565		−0.4%
2021 (est.)	556	▼	−1.6%

As of the 2000 census, there were 623 people, 283 households, and 179 families residing in the borough. The population density was 1,568.3 inhabitants per square mile (605.5/km^{2}). There were 293 housing units at an average density of 737.6 per square mile (284.8/km^{2}). The racial makeup of the borough was 95.83% White, 3.53% African American, and 0.64% from two or more races. Hispanic or Latino of any race were 0.16% of the population.

There were 283 households, out of which 22.3% had children under the age of 18 living with them, 46.6% were married couples living together, 11.3% had a female householder with no husband present, and 36.7% were non-families. 33.9% of all households were made up of individuals, and 18.7% had someone living alone who was 65 years of age or older. The average household size was 2.20 and the average family size was 2.81.

In the borough the population was spread out, with 20.1% under the age of 18, 6.7% from 18 to 24, 22.8% from 25 to 44, 25.2% from 45 to 64, and 25.2% who were 65 years of age or older. The median age was 46 years. For every 100 females, there were 88.8 males. For every 100 females age 18 and over, there were 79.8 males.

The median income for a household in the borough was $25,625, and the median income for a family was $35,481. Males had a median income of $30,000 versus $25,313 for females. The per capita income for the borough was $14,465. About 8.2% of families and 9.8% of the population were below the poverty line, including 2.5% of those under age 18 and 12.7% of those age 65 or over.

== Education ==
Children in East Rochester are served by the Rochester Area School District. The current schools serving East Rochester are:

- Rochester Elementary School – grades K–5
- Rochester Middle School – grades 6–8
- Rochester Area High School – grades 9–12

== See also ==
- List of cities and towns along the Ohio River
