= Cornell High School =

Coraopolis, Pennsylvania high school

Coordinates: 40.51105°N 80.16451°W

- 1099 Maple St. Coraopolis, Pennsylvania

Information
- Teaching staff: 24.10 (FTE)
- Grades: 7-12
- Enrollment: 252 (2024–2025)
- Student to teacher ratio: 10.46
- Colors: Blue and Gold
- Mascot: Raiders

Map of Allegheny County, Pennsylvania Public School Districts

Cornell High School is a public high school located in the borough of Coraopolis, Pennsylvania, a suburb of Pittsburgh in Allegheny County in the state of Pennsylvania. Cornell High School serves students from the borough of Coraopolis, as well as Neville Township or Neville Island as it is more commonly called. The school's mascot are the Raiders, and the colors are blue and gold. The high school is part of the Cornell School District.

== Notable alumni ==
- Dane Jackson, football player
