= Fleming Park Bridge =

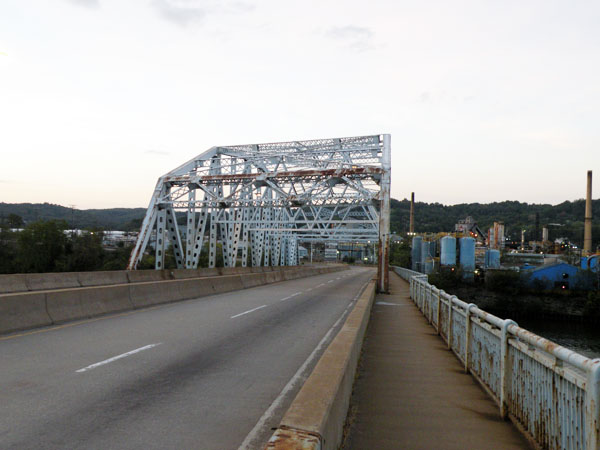
- Coordinates: 40°29′28″N 80°04′48″W
- Carries: Neville Rd, Fleming Park Rd; four lanes with divided sidewalk on upstream side
- Crosses: Ohio River
- Locale: Neville Township, Pennsylvania and Stowe Township, Pennsylvania

Characteristics
- Design: Steel truss bridge
- Total length: 953 ft
- Longest span: 390 ft

History
- Opened: 1955; 71 years ago
- Closed: October 2018; 7 years ago

Location
- Interactive map of Fleming Park Bridge

The Fleming Park Bridge is a through truss bridge which spans the back channel of the Ohio River, between Neville Island and Stowe Township, PA. Although the Ohio River's back channel is only 590 feet wide, roughly 660 feet of this newer bridge was erected over water due to the unique 65-degree angle of the structure's trajectory.

The bridge was closed for 11 months between 2018 and 2019 in order to complete a $13 million rehabilitation project.

== History ==
Built in 1955, the Fleming Park Bridge replaced an 1894 girder bridge which originally was erected on the same property.

In September 1981, county leaders closed the 26-year-old bridge when it was determined that the structure had been critically weakened by a fire which resulted from the collision of a Gulf Oil gasoline tanker truck with a bus after the tanker failed to negotiate a sharp curve on the Neville Island side of the bridge. Seven people were injured. Following the closure, 14,000 motorists were forced to detour five miles away to the Coraopolis-Neville Bridge. That bridge had already had its own issues at the time, with traffic limited to one lane in each direction due to construction.

The bridge was closed by Allegheny County leaders on August 13, 2018, after a routine inspection discovered serious deterioration on multiple members and areas critical for the bridge's safety. PennDOT considered multiple options, including a comprehensive yet costly rehabilitation project to repair the deteriorated areas and try to stop further deterioration. Alternatively, a project to replace the existing truss superstructure with a girder/stringer bridge similar to that of the Coraopolis Bridge downstream was considered, as was just closing the bridge to traffic permanently and routing all Neville Island-bound traffic over the Coraopolis Bridge. Ultimately, the bridge was deemed enough of a necessity that the first option was chosen. A $11,000,000 rehabilitation project was initially projected by planners to be completed by either June or July 2019.

In late August 2019, the Allegheny County Department of Public Works announced that the bridge would be open again by the last Friday of the month. The project, which took eleven months to complete and was handled by Mosites Construction, involved expansion dam and sidewalk replacement, steel repairs, painting, the placement of a latex overlay on the bridge's concrete deck, and the addition of bike lanes on both sides of the bridge, as well as a new lane configuration, which changed the old four-lane traffic flow (two lanes in each direction) to two-lane traffic (one lane each direction for cars plus new bike lanes). When construction crews finished work earlier than anticipated, county leaders opted to re-open the bridge a day earlier (on Thursday afternoon). News reports confirmed that the final project cost was $13 million.
