= Dane Jackson (American football) =

American football player (born 1996)

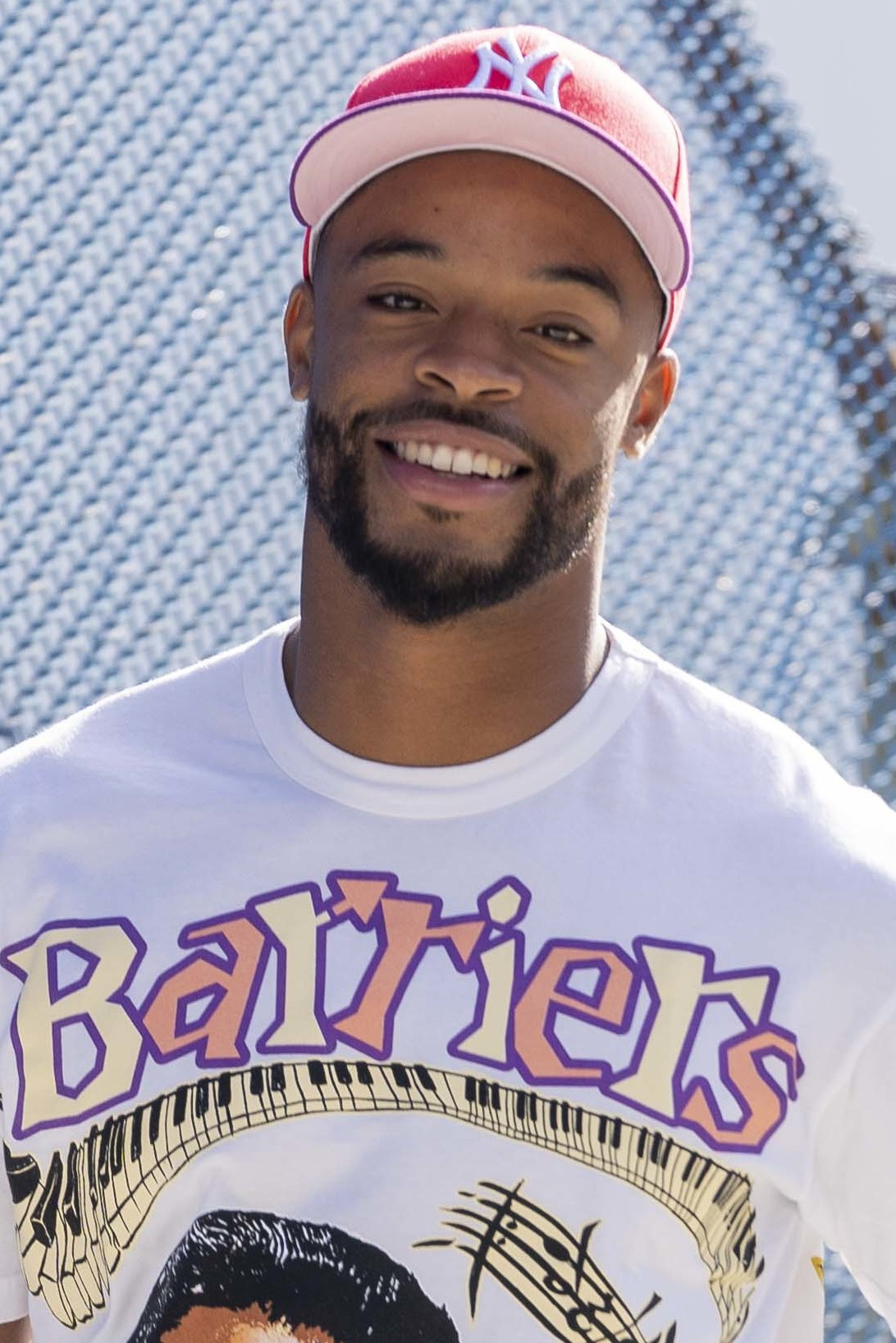
- Jackson in 2021

No. 30, 23
- Position: Cornerback

Personal information
- Born: November 29, 1996 (age 29); Coraopolis, Pennsylvania, U.S.
- Listed height: 5 ft 11 in (1.80 m)
- Listed weight: 180 lb (82 kg)

Career information
- High school: Cornell (Coraopolis)
- College: Pittsburgh (2015–2019)
- NFL draft: 2020: 7th round, 239th overall pick

Career history
- Buffalo Bills (2020–2023); Carolina Panthers (2024); Buffalo Bills (2025); Jacksonville Jaguars (2026)*
- * Offseason or practice squad member only

Awards and highlights
- Second-team All-ACC (2019)

Career NFL statistics
- Total tackles: 178
- Pass deflections: 30
- Interceptions: 3
- Forced fumbles: 2
- Fumble recoveries: 1
- Stats at Pro Football Reference

Dane Tyrez Jackson (born November 29, 1996) is an American former professional football player who was a cornerback in the National Football League (NFL) for six seasons. He played college football for the Pittsburgh Panthers and was selected by the Buffalo Bills in the seventh round of the 2020 NFL draft. He also played for the Carolina Panthers.

== Early life ==
Jackson played high school football at Quaker Valley High School because the high school he attended, Cornell High School, did not have a football team. Jackson was an all-state basketball player for Cornell. He committed to Pittsburgh on June 24, 2014, choosing the Panthers over Bowling Green and Duquesne. He committed the day after then-Pitt coach Paul Chryst offered Jackson a scholarship after seeing him at a Pitt prospect camp.

== College career ==
After playing quarterback in high school, Jackson transitioned to cornerback at Pitt. He redshirted his freshman year and played mostly in a reserve role his redshirt freshman year, but then started every game during his sophomore, junior and senior seasons with Pitt. As a senior, he led Pitt with 12 pass breakups, and had 43 tackles, three for a loss, an interception and a sack assist. After his senior season, Jackson was named second-team All-Atlantic Coast Conference and took part in the 2020 Senior Bowl.

== Professional career ==
Pre-draft measurables
Height	Weight	Arm length	Hand span	Wingspan	40-yard dash	10-yard split	20-yard split	20-yard shuttle	Three-cone drill	Vertical jump	Broad jump
5 ft 11 5/8 in (1.82 m)	187 lb (85 kg)	30 3/8 in (0.77 m)	8 3/4 in (0.22 m)	6 ft 2 7/8 in (1.90 m)	4.57 s	1.56 s	2.67 s	4.27 s	7.07 s	35.0 in (0.89 m)	10 ft 2 in (3.10 m)
All values from NFL Combine

=== Buffalo Bills ===
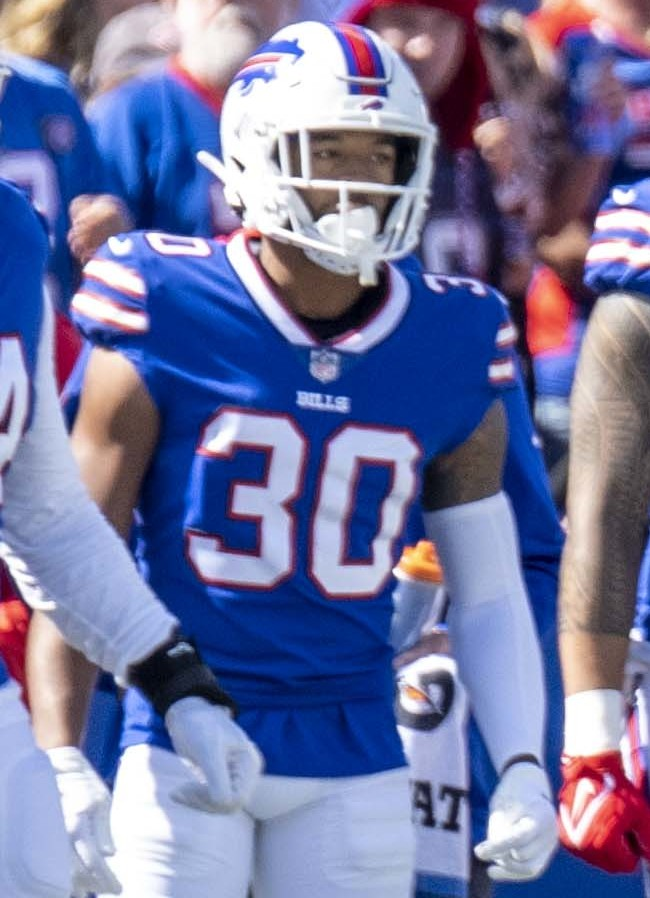
Jackson with the Buffalo Bills in 2021.

The Buffalo Bills selected Jackson in the seventh round with the 239th overall pick in the 2020 NFL draft. Jackson signed a four-year, $3.376 million contract with the Bills on May 7, 2020. He was placed on the reserve/COVID-19 list by the team on July 30, but was activated a week later. He was waived on September 5, and was re-signed to the practice squad the following day.

Following injuries to cornerbacks Levi Wallace and Josh Norman, Jackson was elevated to the active roster on October 13, 2020, and reverted to the practice squad after the game. He was elevated to the active roster on October 24 for the team's Week 7 game against the New York Jets, and reverted to the practice squad after the game. Against the Jets, Jackson finished with three tackles, two passes defensed, and one interception as the Bills won 18–10. He was elevated again on October 31, November 7, November 14, and January 2, 2021, for the team's Weeks 8, 9, 10, and 17 games against the New England Patriots, Seattle Seahawks, Arizona Cardinals, and Miami Dolphins, and reverted to the practice squad after each game. He was elevated again on January 15 and 23 for the divisional playoff game and AFC Championship Game against the Baltimore Ravens and Kansas City Chiefs, and reverted to the practice squad again following each game. On January 26, 2021, Jackson signed a reserves/futures contract with the Bills.

Jackson suffered a neck injury during a Monday Night Football game versus the Tennessee Titans on September 19, 2022, after colliding with teammate Tremaine Edmunds as the two attempted to tackle Tennessee receiver Treylon Burks. He was removed from the field in an ambulance, but was released from the hospital the following day after it was determined he had avoided major damage to the neck and spinal cord.

On March 17, 2023, Jackson re-signed with the Bills on a one-year contract.

=== Carolina Panthers ===
On March 13, 2024, Jackson signed with the Carolina Panthers. He was placed on injured reserve on August 27 to begin the season. He was activated on October 19.

On February 21, 2025, Jackson was released by the Panthers.

=== Buffalo Bills (second stint) ===
On March 14, 2025, the Buffalo Bills signed Jackson to a one-year contract. He was released on August 26 as part of final roster cuts and re-signed to the practice squad the next day. He was promoted to the active roster on January 7, 2026. On March 6, Jackson was released by the Bills.

=== Jacksonville Jaguars ===
On June 4, 2026, Jackson signed with the Jacksonville Jaguars. On July 28, he retired from professional football.

== Career statistics ==
Legend
**Bold**	Career high

=== NFL ===
==== Regular season ====
Year	Team	Games		Tackles						Interceptions						Fumbles	
Year	Team	GP	GS	Comb	Solo	Ast	Sack	Sfty	TFL	PD	Int	Yds	Avg	Lng	TD	FF	FR
2020	BUF	5	2	15	13	2	0.0	0	**1**	5	1	6	6.0	6	0	0	**1**
2021	BUF	17	6	41	33	**8**	0.0	0	0	6	0	0	0.0	0	0	0	0
2022	BUF	15	14	**57**	**49**	**8**	0.0	0	**1**	**12**	**2**	**13**	**6.5**	**11**	0	0	0
2023	BUF	10	6	39	34	5	0.0	0	0	4	0	0	0	0	0	0	0
2024	CAR	9	3	23	15	**8**	0.0	0	**1**	2	0	0	0	0	0	0	0
2025	BUF	3	0	3	0	3	0.0	0	0	0	0	0	0	0	0	0	0
Career		59	31	178	144	34	0.0	0	3	29	3	19	6.3	11	0	0	1

==== Postseason ====
Year	Team	Games		Tackles						Interceptions						Fumbles	
Year	Team	GP	GS	Comb	Solo	Ast	Sack	Sfty	TFL	PD	Int	Yds	Avg	Lng	TD	FF	FR
2021	BUF	2	2	**10**	**9**	1	0.0	0	**1**	0	0	0	0.0	0	0	0	0
2022	BUF	2	1	4	2	**2**	0.0	0	0	1	0	0	0.0	0	0	0	0
2023	BUF	2	2	2	1	1	0.0	0	0	**4**	0	0	0.0	0	0	0	0
2025	BUF	2	0	1	1	0	0.0	0	0	0	0	0	0.0	0	0	0	0
Career		8	5	17	13	4	0.0	0	1	5	0	0	0.0	0	0	0	0

=== College ===
Year	Team	GP	Tackles			Interceptions		Fumbles	
Year	Team	GP	TOT	TFL	SACK	PD	INT	FF	FR
2016	Pitt	12	18	0.0	0.0	5	1	0	0
2017	Pitt	12	40	2.0	**1.0**	11	**2**	0	0
2018	Pitt	13	**47**	**4.0**	0.0	**14**	0	**4**	**2**
2019	Pitt	13	43	3.0	0.5	13	1	0	0
**Total**		**50**	**148**	**9.0**	**1.5**	**43**	**4**	**4**	**2**
