= Coraopolis station =

Disused train station in Pennsylvania, US

- Coraopolis Railroad Station
- U.S. National Register of Historic Places
- Pittsburgh Landmark – PHLF
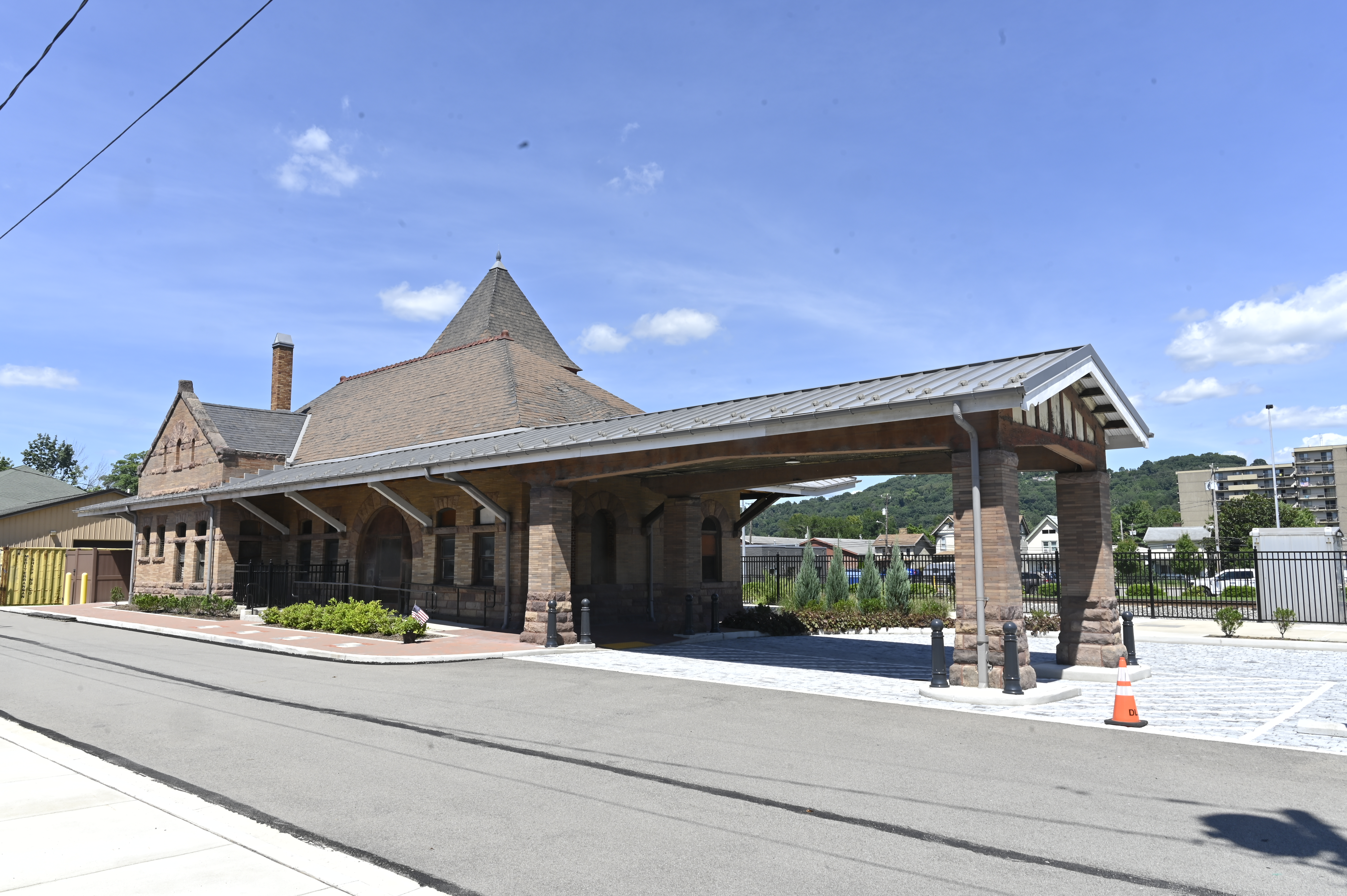
- Station in 2026

- Location within Pennsylvania Location within the United States
- Location: Neville Ave. and Mill St., Coraopolis, Pennsylvania
- Coordinates: 40°31′8″N 80°9′50″W
- Area: 0.4 acres (0.16 ha)
- Architect: Shepley, Rutan and Coolidge
- Architectural style: Romanesque, Richardsonian Romanesque
- NRHP reference No.: 79002156

Significant dates
- Added to NRHP: April 20, 1979
- Designated PHLF: December 10, 2012

Coraopolis station is a disused train station in Coraopolis, Pennsylvania. The train station was built in 1896 by the Pittsburgh and Lake Erie Railroad, and designed by architects Shepley, Rutan and Coolidge in Richardsonian Romanesque style.

== Overview ==
According to the Pittsburgh History and Landmarks Foundation, the "use of this particular style in the Pittsburgh area, especially work by Shepley, Rutan, and Coolidge, represents an important aspect of the architectural history of the Pittsburgh area."

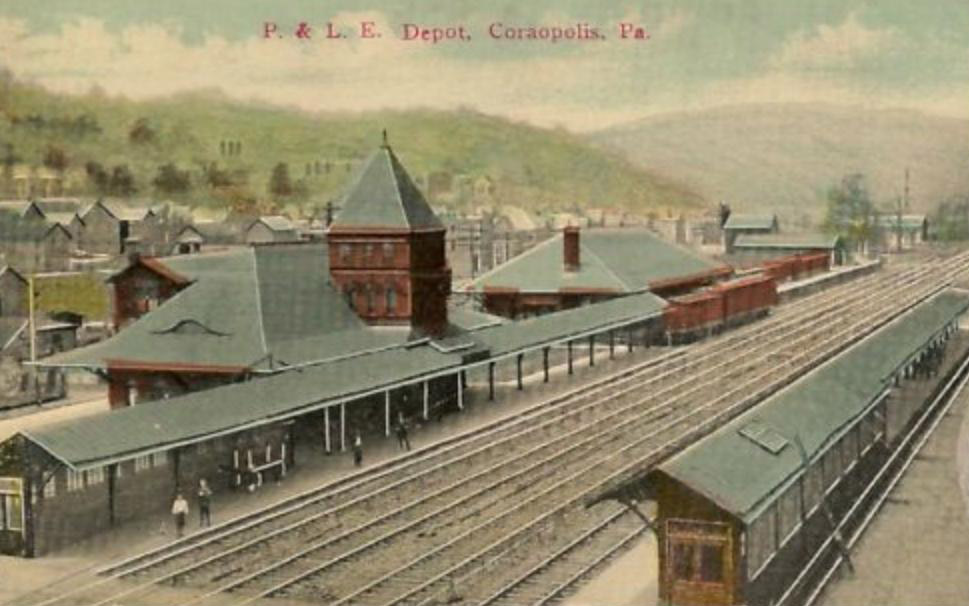
Coraopolis station shortly after its construction

The building and its sister stations in Glassport and New Castle were constructed in the late 1890s as part of an expansion of the Pittsburgh and Lake Erie Railroad's commuter line into the suburbs of Pittsburgh.

The building was nominated for the National Register of Historic Places by the Pittsburgh History and Landmarks Foundation in 1978. It was added to the National Register of Historic Places on April 20, 1979. Its addition to the list as the Coraopolis Railroad Station was announced by the executive director of the Pennsylvania Historical and Museum Commission. At the time, the building was still owned by the Pittsburgh and Lake Erie Railroad and was occupied by an auto equipment dealer.

In 1999, the Coraopolis Economic Revitalization Corporation, Inc. (CERC) proposed using the railroad station as the basis for a future development, including a museum and a "Coraopolis Station Square". The station was added to the List of Pittsburgh History and Landmarks Foundation Historic Landmarks on December 10, 2012.

Plans have been made to convert the historic station to a trailside cafe seating 75 and a history museum. In 2014, it was estimated that $1.2 million would be needed for that purpose. In 2015, the Coraopolis Community Development Foundation raised $5000 for structure stabilization, work which officially began October 24, 2015. The foundation has submitted an application for a $250,000 Community Infrastructure and Tourism Fund grant through the Allegheny County Economic Development office to move the project forward. The station sits adjacent to the future Ohio River Greenway Trail which will connect it to the Montour Trail Extension. at Coraopolis/Neville Island Bridge.

== Gallery ==
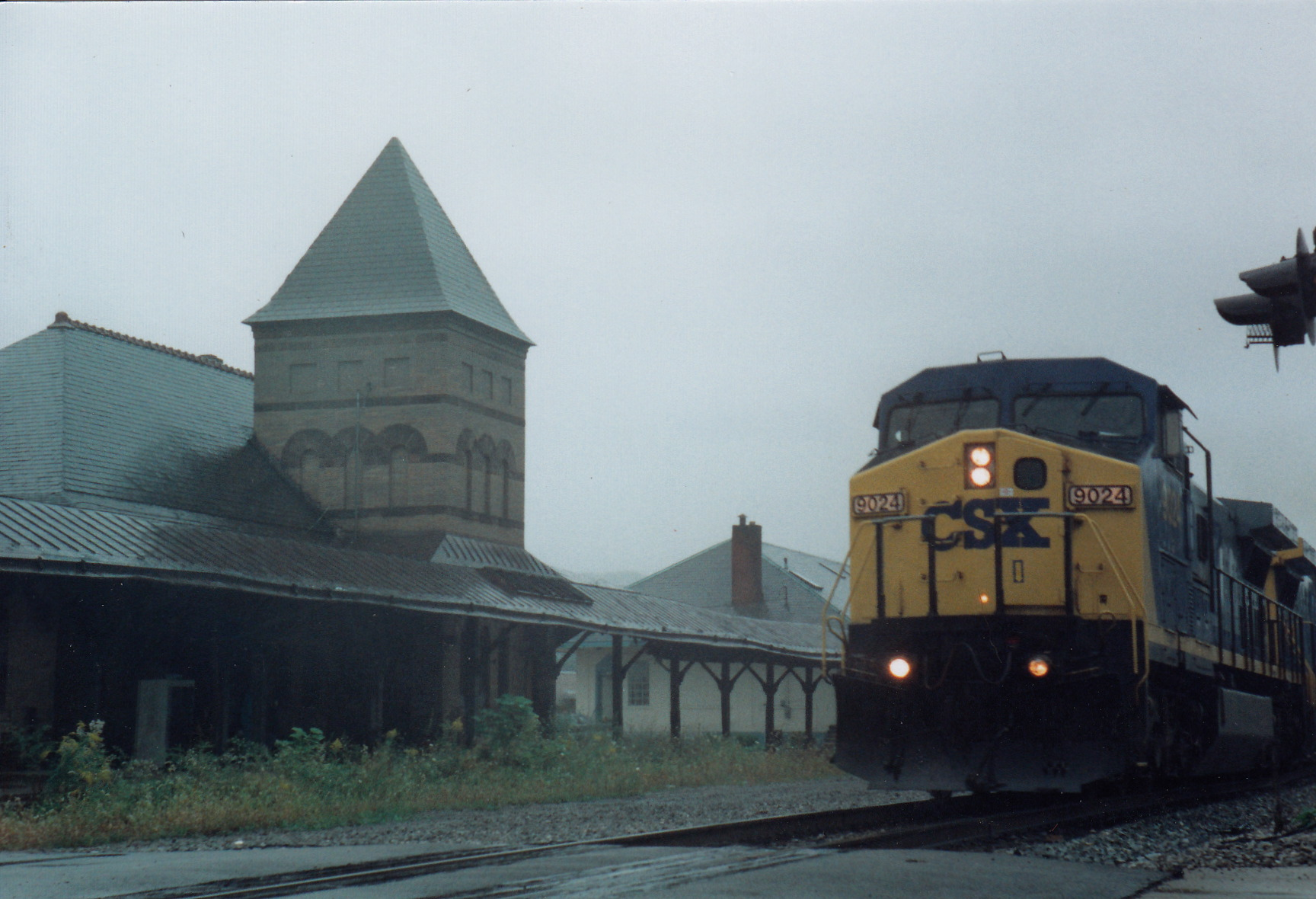
A CSX GE C40-9W locomotive rolls past the Coraopolis Railroad Station in the rain

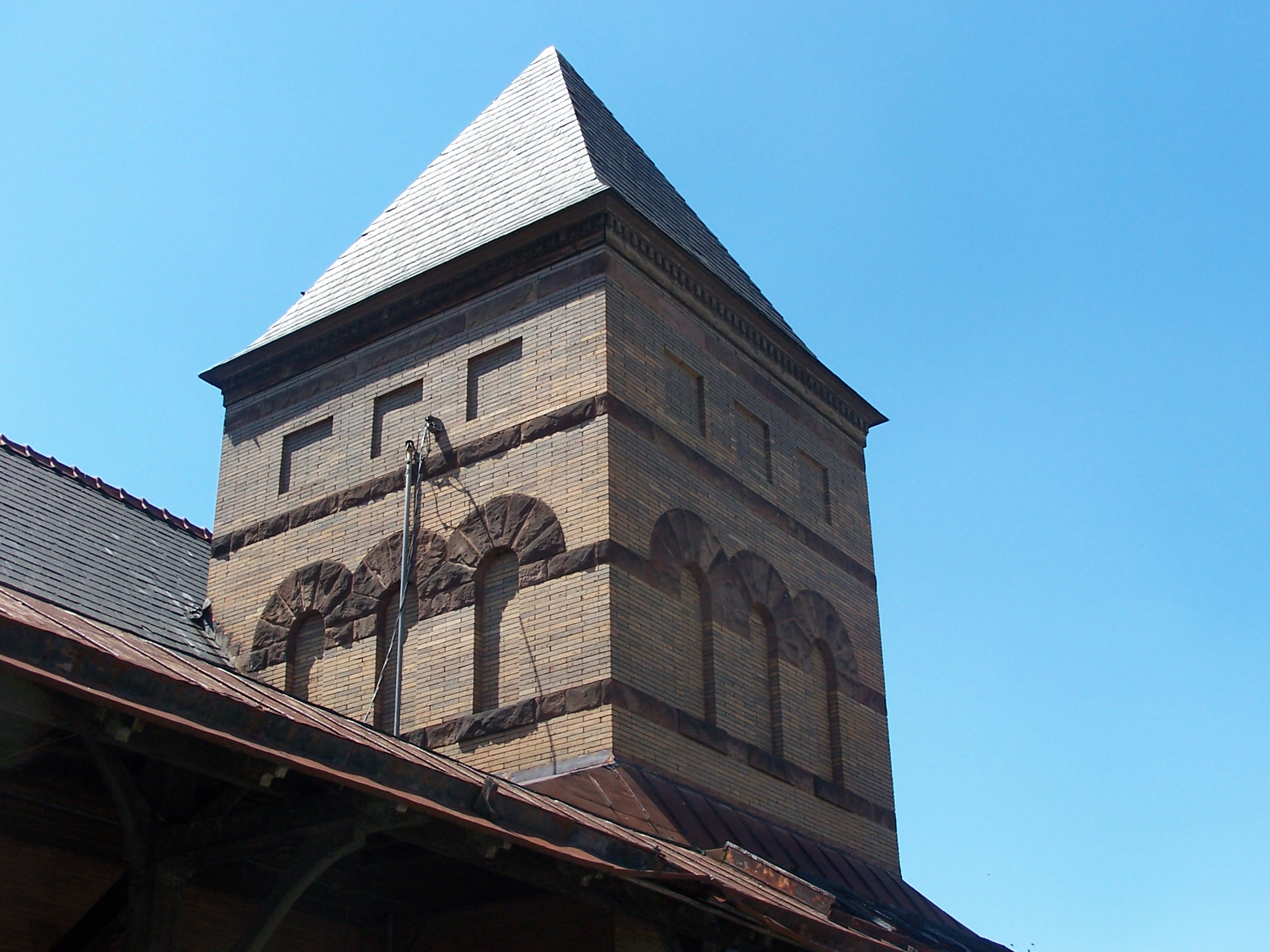
Detail of the station tower

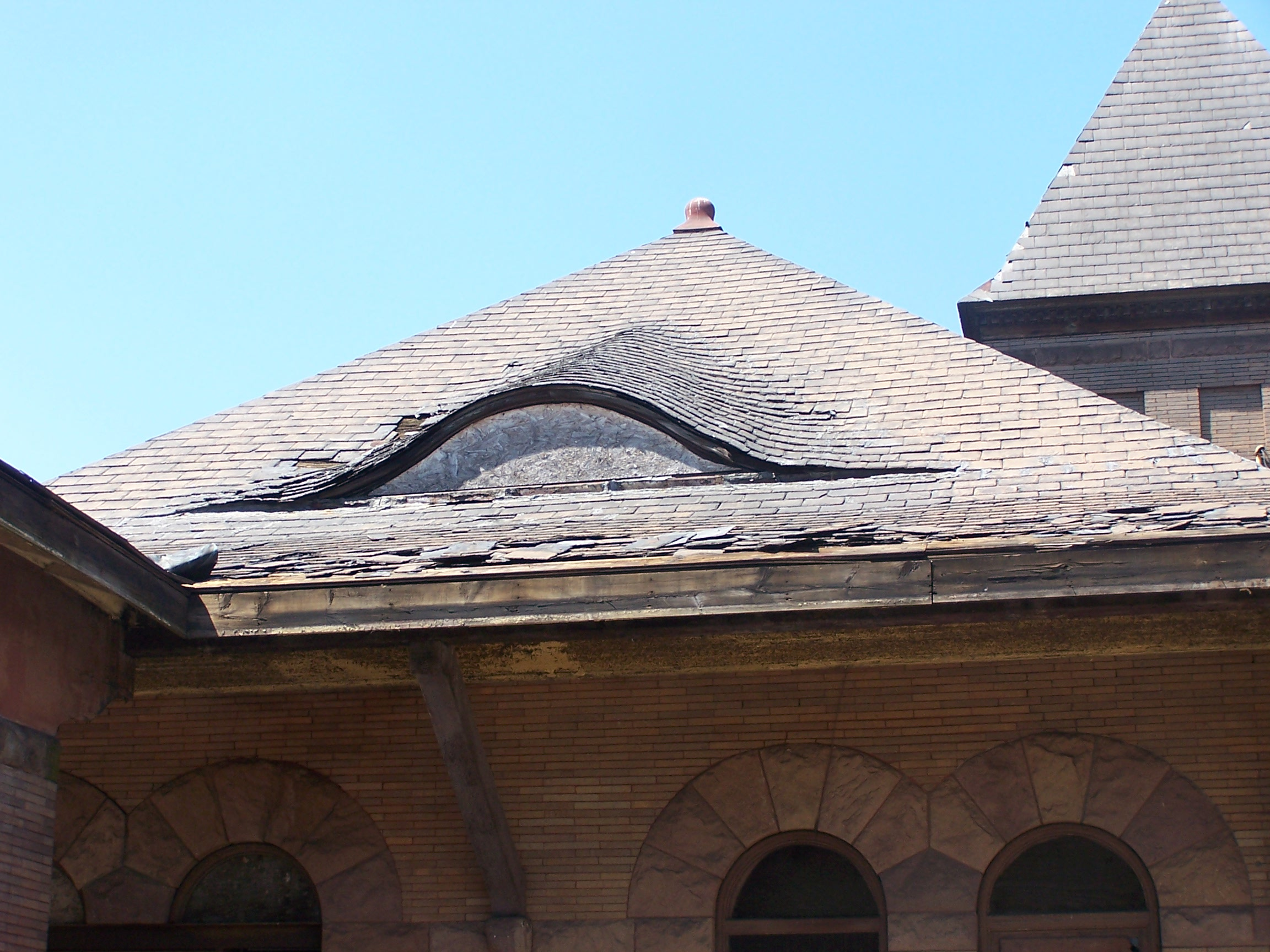
Detail of the signature eyebrow window

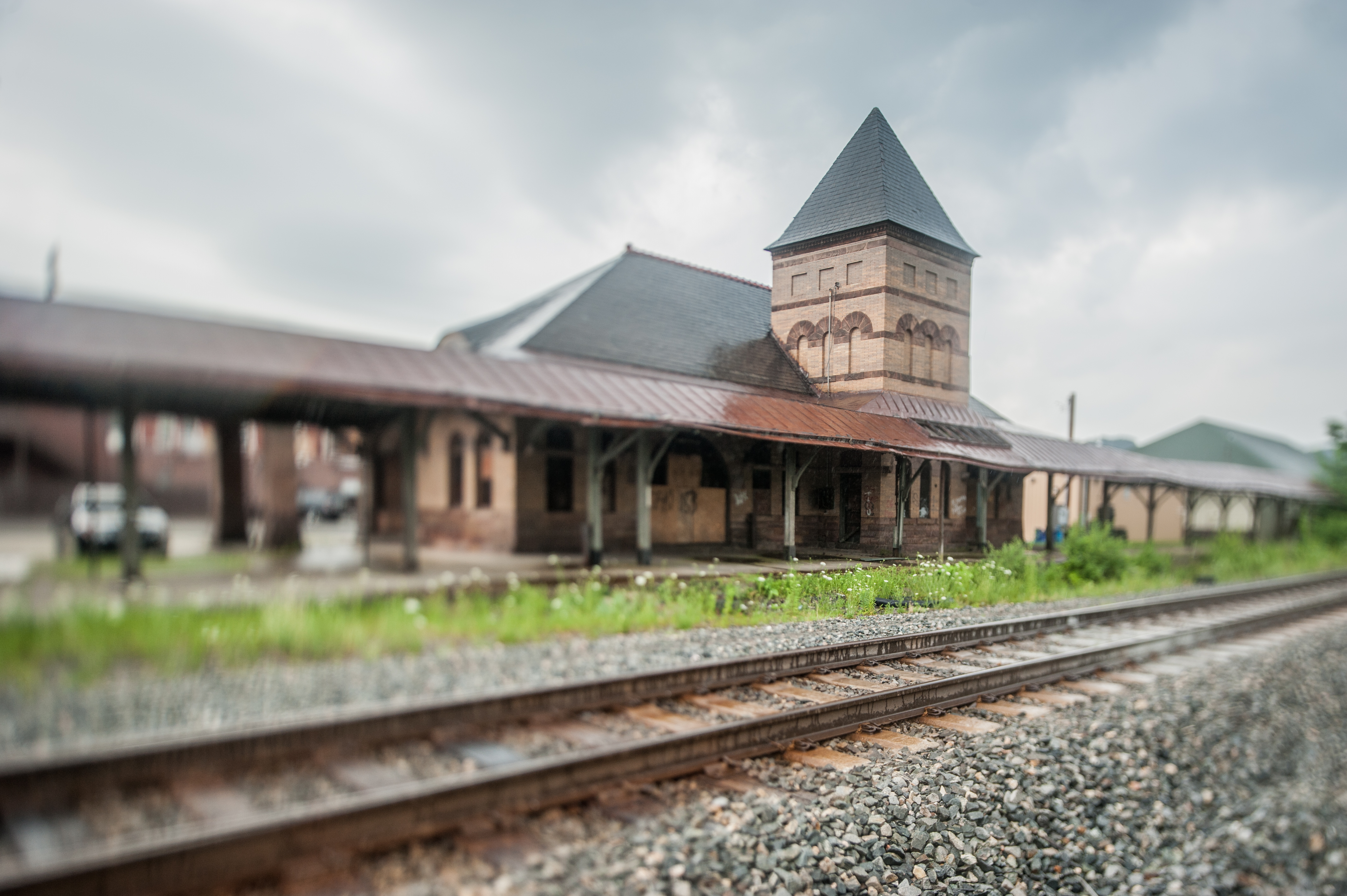
The Coraopolis Railroad Station

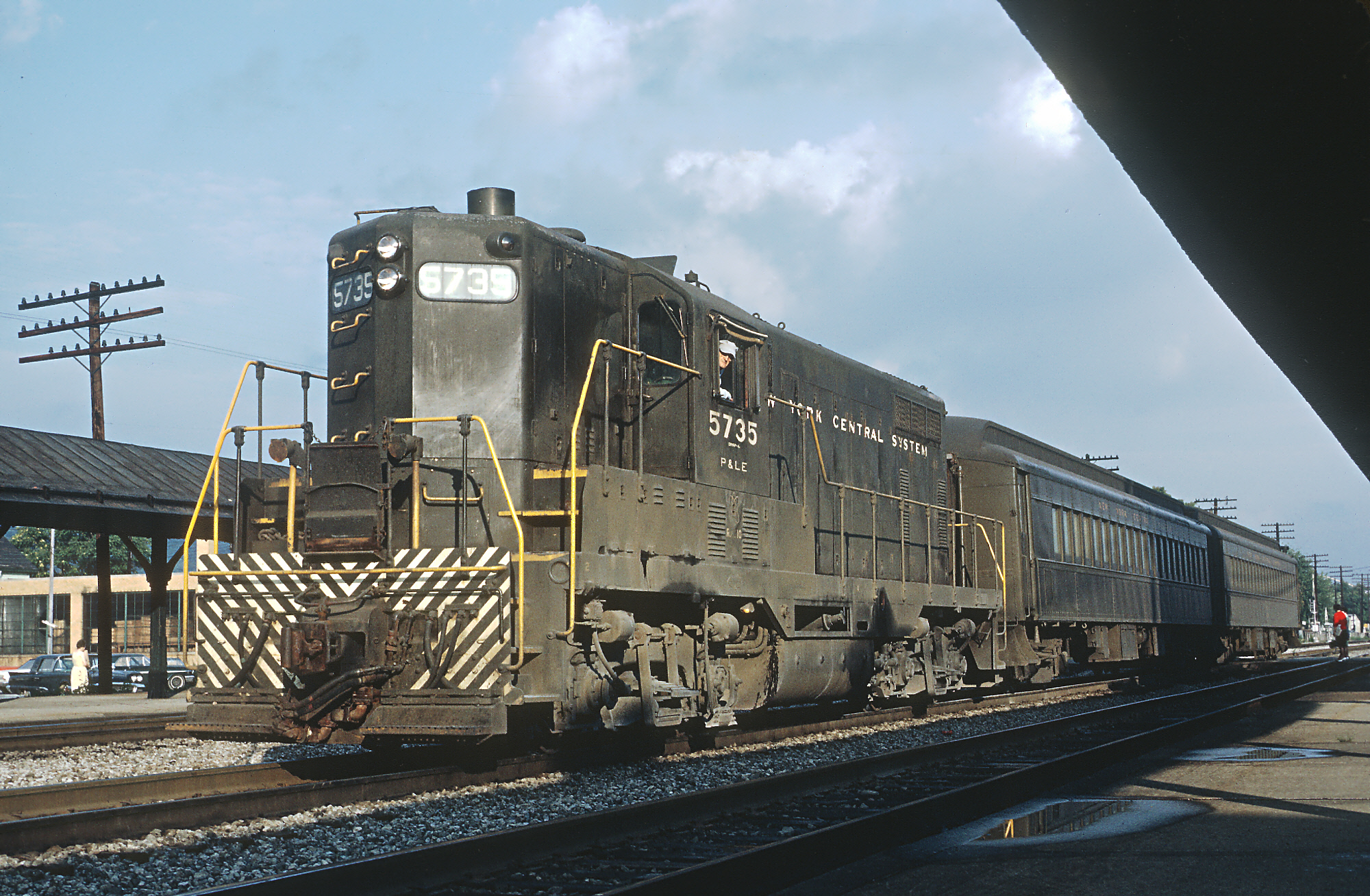
P&LE commuter train in Coraopolis station, 1965

== See also ==
- National Register of Historic Places listings in Allegheny County, Pennsylvania
- Montour Trail
- Ohio River Trail

Preceding station	New York Central Railroad	Following station
South Heights toward Youngstown	Pittsburgh and Lake Erie Railroad Main Line	Pittsburgh Terminus
Kendall toward Youngstown	Pittsburgh and Lake Erie Railroad Main Line	Montour Junction toward Pittsburgh
