= Coraopolis, Pennsylvania =

Borough in Pennsylvania, US

- Borough
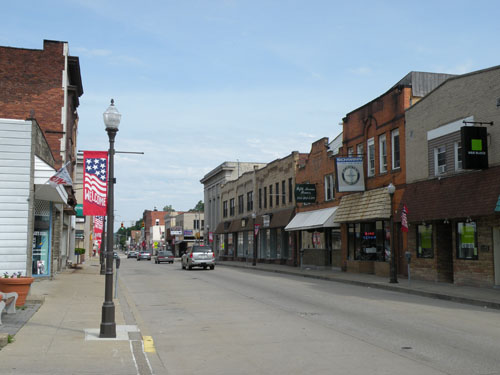
- 5th Avenue, Coraopolis, Pennsylvania

- Seal
- Etymology: Koreopolis, Greek for "Maiden city"
- Nickname: Cory
- Location in Allegheny County and the U.S. state of Pennsylvania.
- Coordinates: 40°30′56.94″N 80°9′46.05″W
- Country: United States
- State: Pennsylvania
- County: Allegheny
- Settled in 1773: Incorporated in 1886

Government
  - Mayor: Michael Alan Dixon (D)
  - Borough Council President: Mike Harris

Area
  - Total: 1.46 sq mi (3.79 km^{2})
  - Land: 1.33 sq mi (3.44 km^{2})
  - Water: 0.14 sq mi (0.35 km^{2})

Population (2020)
  - Total: 5,559
  - Density: 4,179.5/sq mi (1,613.71/km^{2})
- Time zone: UTC-5 (EST)
  - Summer (DST): UTC-4 (EDT)
- ZIP code: 15108
- Area code: 412
- FIPS code: 42-16144
- School District: Cornell
- Website: Coraopolis

Coraopolis (/ˌkoʊriˈɒpəlɪs/) is a borough in Allegheny County, Pennsylvania, United States, along the Ohio River. The population was 5,559 at the 2020 census.

Coraopolis is located west of Pittsburgh along the Ohio River and to the east of the Pittsburgh International Airport. The borough has steep topography, numerous brick streets and many large, old houses. The American Bridge Company is headquartered in Coraopolis.

== History ==
=== Early history ===
On April 3, 1769, Andrew Montour, an Indian interpreter who had provided service to English settlers during the French and Indian War, was granted a land patent for approximately 350 acres (1.4 km^{2}) of what would later become the borough of Coraopolis and Neville Island. However, there is no evidence that Montour ever lived on this tract. The first permanent white settler in Coraopolis was Capt. Robert Vance, who settled in the vicinity of Montour's tract around 1773, just prior to the beginning of the American Revolution. Vance, a Virginian, had been a member of the regiment commanded by George Washington at the Braddock expedition during the French and Indian War. For the protection of himself and his neighbors, of whom several arrived within a few years, Vance had a log stockade built with a stone blockhouse to protect the area against Indian raids. This was known as Vance Fort (or Fort Vance). The site of the fort was around present-day Broadway and Chestnut streets, near Second Avenue. Over time the community grew and developed, and it became known as Middletown in the 1800s, either because it was situated midway between Pittsburgh and Beaver, Pennsylvania, or perhaps after an early settler named Alexander Middleton who supposedly ran "Middleton's Tavern" in the area.

One of the most important early industries in the area was begun by the Watson family, English immigrants who arrived in America in 1830. The Watsons built a sawmill on the site of the former municipal building on Fifth Avenue. Later, they operated a much larger grist mill on the river bank at Mill Street, until 1887.

=== Founding ===
The borough was incorporated on June 7, 1886. It was previously known as a village under the name of Middletown, while the post office name was Vancefort. It was established in August 1861, and changed to Coraopolis in March 1886. Legend has it that the borough was named for a member of the Watson family, Cora Watson, who was born on February 2, 1870. However, an old newspaper uncovered by longtime resident and local historian Dr. Frank Braden, Jr. suggests it more likely took the appellation from a Greek word for "maiden city". According to page 7 of the book Coraopolis, by Gia Tatone, Coraopolis Historical Society (2007), "The newspaper [Dr. Frank Braden, Jr. uncovered] was simply called the News and was published in Coraopolis, Pennsylvania, on June 5, 1897. The newspaper discusses the confusion that was occurring with the post offices in regard to the name Middletown, because several other areas in the state of Pennsylvania shared the same name. With a borough now being established, the Reverend Josiah Dillon, a pioneer clergyman, suggested the name to be changed to Coraopolis. Dillon knew Greek and was also the first burgess (mayor) at the time. So he suggested combining Kore meaning 'maiden' and opolis meaning 'city' ('maiden city') to achieve Koreopolis. However, when Greek letters and pronunciation were turned to English, it is said the spelling therefore accidentally got changed." The borough was built on land then owned by James Harvey McCabe and when the borough charter was granted, he was elected first burgess. "and, under his careful and interested administration the departments of the new government and were, in an astonishing short time, working with great lubricity and resulting high efficiency. As he took the lead in the matter of establishing the new form of government, so it was his energetic championing of the projected laying of the tracks of the Pittsburg [sic] and Lake Erie through the borough that made that enterprise possible, his active assistance in securing rights of way being an important factor in its success."

=== Growth to modern day ===
Community development in Coraopolis moved along gradually with the building of the Pittsburgh and Lake Erie Railroad in 1877. Several Coraopolis residents were stockholders in this enterprise. Eventually the P&LE spun off the Montour Railroad as a subsidiary to bring coal in from the many mines south of town. Its headquarters and main yard remained in Coraopolis. The Montour at its peak ran 50 miles to Clairton with mines all along the way. The railroad ran until the 1980s, when the coal ran out and it was closed. Its old right of way is now part of the Montour Trail.

In 1892, community development took off with the construction of the first high-speed electric street railway in the United States. The railway ran from downtown Pittsburgh through McKees Rocks, Neville Island and Coraopolis to Sewickley. Streetcars ran until 1955. Along with the railway came Consolidated Lamp and Glass Company to Coraopolis, moving from its location in Fostoria, Ohio. Consolidated Glass employed up to 350 people, and was located in Coraopolis from 1895 until 1963. Other Coraopolis residents worked for the new industries established on Neville Island. Shafer Bus Line was headquartered in Coraopolis and served the western part of Allegheny County south of the Ohio River until 1960, when it was bought out by PennDOT, which continues to run buses between Coraopolis, the Pittsburgh International Airport and downtown Pittsburgh. Standard Steel Spring Company, which was bought out by North American Rockwell Steel Corporation, operated from 1900 until 1960, when it moved to Mishewaka, Indiana. The plant made springs, bumpers and frames for vehicles. It employed 10,000 men working three shifts a day seven days a week.

Coraopolis' first municipal building was built in 1897 on State Avenue and was used until 1929, when next building was constructed on Fifth Ave. Coraopolis dedicated a new municipal complex on Fourth Ave in 2017 that houses all municipal departments, including the police and fire stations.

Two significant contributions to modern educational practice took place in the area. In 1955, Dr. Harry Houtz published a six-year study in the National Education Journal demonstrating that phonics was a more effective way of teaching reading, and in 1957, Herbert Snell published his study of performance-based academic tracking in junior high, which became widely adopted. Coraopolis and Neville Township merged their schools to form Cornell School District in 1971, and all students reported to the new Cornell Educational Center in 1976.

Coraopolis is the birthplace of actors Michael Keaton and S. William Hinzman. Jerry Gibson, a Negro league baseball player, played here for the Coraopolis Grays. The corporate headquarters for American Bridge Company are located in Coraopolis.

Coraopolis is experiencing a period of revitalization highlighted by new storefront businesses and façade improvements in the central business district. In 2017, two new brewpubs, a craft distillery, a coffee shop, a restaurant, and several other small businesses opened their doors. Coraopolis also shares a new athletic complex with neighboring Robinson and Moon Townships that will feature soccer, rugby, and lacrosse fields, when completed. The 1896 Richardsonian Romanesque train station is also being restored, and will become a community center and event space once completed.

== Geography ==
Coraopolis is located at 40°30′57″N 80°9′46″W (40.515818, -80.162791). According to the U.S. Census Bureau, the borough has a total area of 1.5 square miles (3.9 km^{2}), of which 1.3 square miles (3.4 km^{2}) is land and 0.1 square miles (0.26 km^{2}), or 9.46%, is water.

=== Surrounding and adjacent communities ===
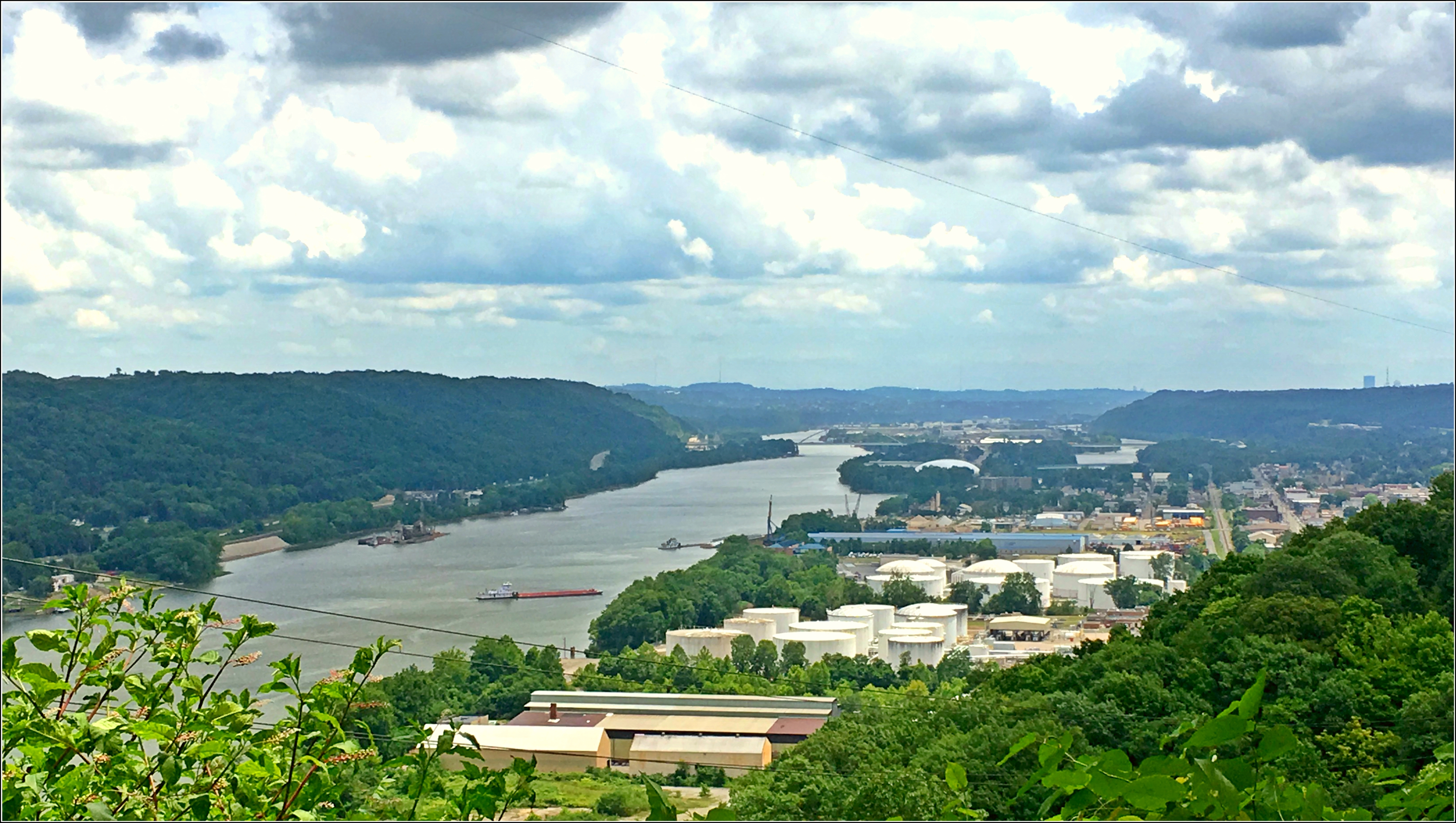
The Ohio River with Coraopolis on the right and the top of Pittsburgh's U.S. Steel Tower in the far background

Situated along the southern bank of the Ohio River, Coraopolis has two land borders, including Moon Township to the south and west and Robinson Township to the southeast. Across the Ohio River's back channel, Coraopolis is connected to Neville Island (Neville Township) via the Coraopolis Bridge to the northeast and is adjacent to the boroughs of Haysville, Glen Osborne, and Sewickley across the Ohio River's confluence at the northeast end of Neville Island.

== Demographics ==
Historical population
Census	Pop.	Note	%±
1890	962		—
1900	2,555		165.6%
1910	5,252		105.6%
1920	6,162		17.3%
1930	10,724		74.0%
1940	11,086		3.4%
1950	10,498		−5.3%
1960	9,643		−8.1%
1970	8,435		−12.5%
1980	7,308		−13.4%
1990	6,747		−7.7%
2000	6,131		−9.1%
2010	5,677		−7.4%
2020	5,559		−2.1%

As of the census of 2000, there were 6,131 people, 2,880 households, and 1,552 families residing in the borough. The population density was 4,582.3 people per square mile (1,769.2 people/km^{2}). There were 3,119 housing units at an average density of 2,331.1 per square mile (900.0/km^{2}). The racial makeup of the borough was 84.96% White, 12.43% Black or African American, 0.08% Native American, 0.28% Asian, 0.02% Pacific Islander, 0.57% from other races, and 1.66% from two or more races. Hispanic or Latino of any race were 0.98% of the population.

There were 2,880 households, out of which 21.4% had children under the age of 18 living with them, 38.0% were married couples living together, 11.8% had a female householder with no husband present, and 46.1% were non-families. 40.3% of all households were made up of individuals, and 19.2% had someone living alone who was 65 years of age or older. The average household size was 2.10 and the average family size was 2.85.

In the borough, the population was spread out, with 19.4% under the age of 18, 7.2% from 18 to 24, 30.3% from 25 to 44, 21.6% from 45 to 64, and 21.5% who were 65 years of age or older. The median age was 41 years. For every 100 females, there were 84.1 males. For every 100 females age 18 and over, there were 81.7 males.

The median income for a household in the borough was $32,321, and the median income for a family was $41,081. Males had a median income of $31,374 versus $25,269 for females. The per capita income for the borough was $17,595. About 6.4% of families and 9.7% of the population were below the poverty line, including 10.9% of those under age 18 and 11.8% of those age 65 or over.

== Government and politics ==
Coraopolis is a Pennsylvania borough with an elected borough council, elected mayor, and a professional borough manager. It is located within Pennsylvania's Representative District 45, Pennsylvania Senate District 42, and U.S. Congressional District 17.

Presidential Elections Results
Year	Republican	Democratic	Third Parties
2020	38% 1,138	59% 1,768	1% 47
2016	40% 1,066	55% 1,462	5% 128
2012	39% 1,004	60% 1,555	1% 32

== Notable people ==
- Bill DeVenzio, professional basketball player
- Dane Jackson, NFL football player
- Michael Keaton, actor and director
- John Hufnagel, Canadian Football League, quarterback, coach, general manager, chiefly with the Calgary Stampeders
- JT Miller, NHL hockey player

== See also ==
- List of cities and towns along the Ohio River
- Coraopolis Bridge
- Coraopolis Railroad Station

== Gallery ==
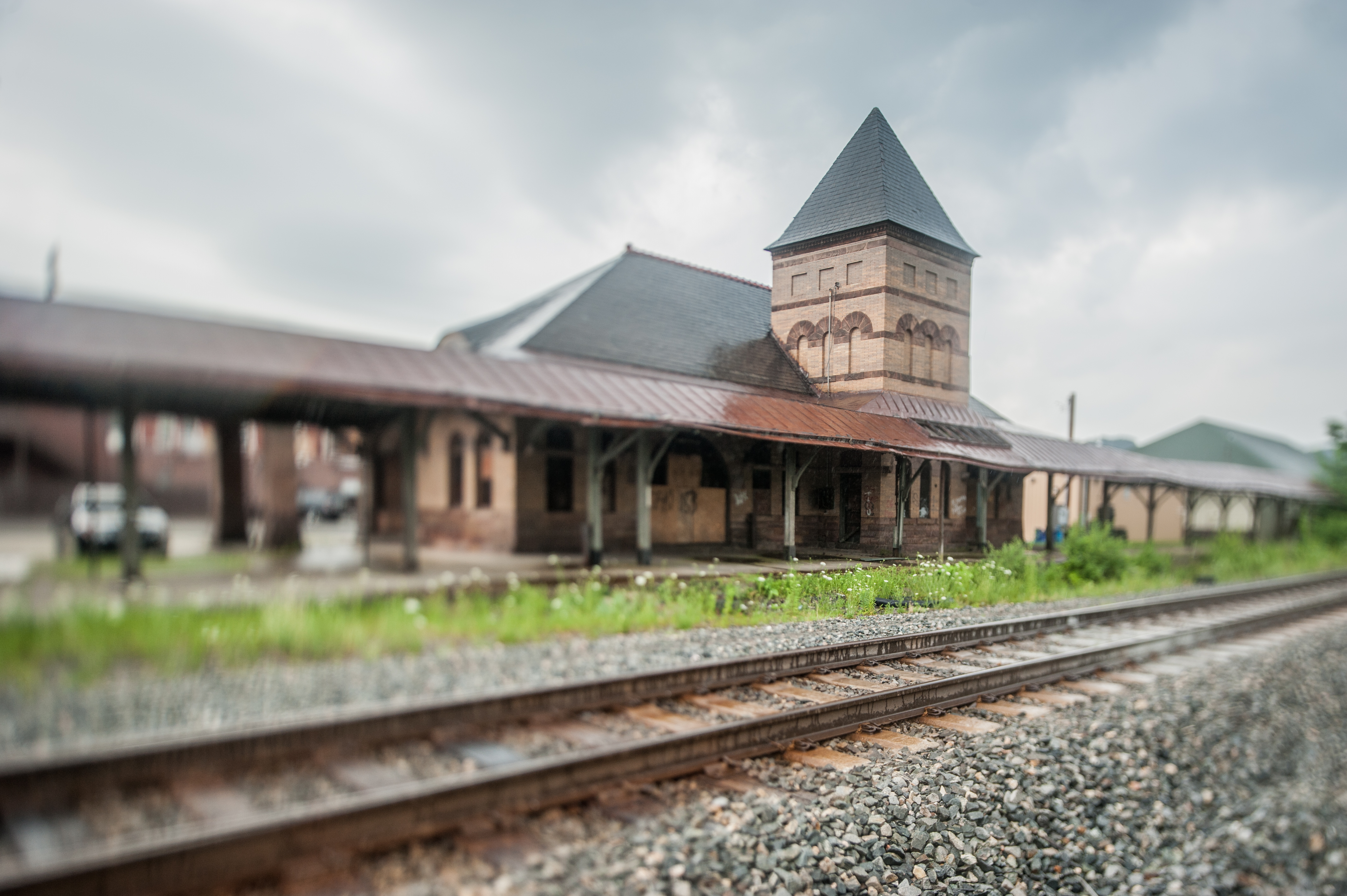
The Coraopolis Railroad Station

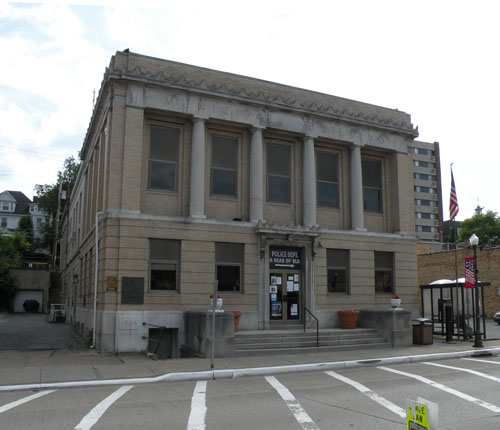
Former Coraopolis municipal building

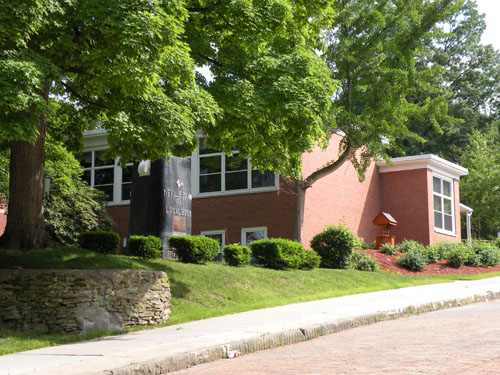
Coraopolis library

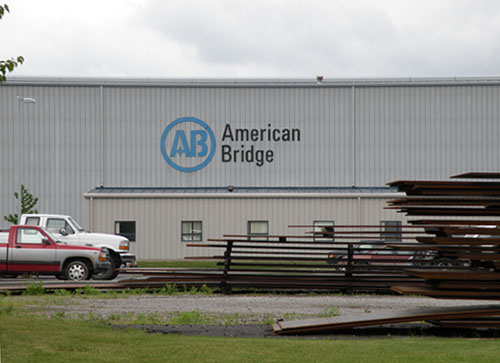
A building that is part of the American Bridge Company's headquarters in Coraopolis

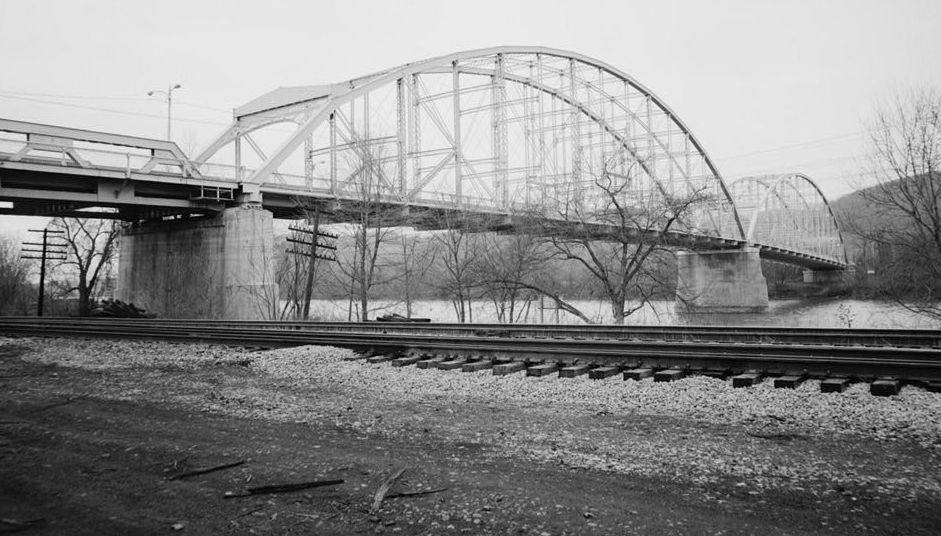
The Coraopolis Bridge

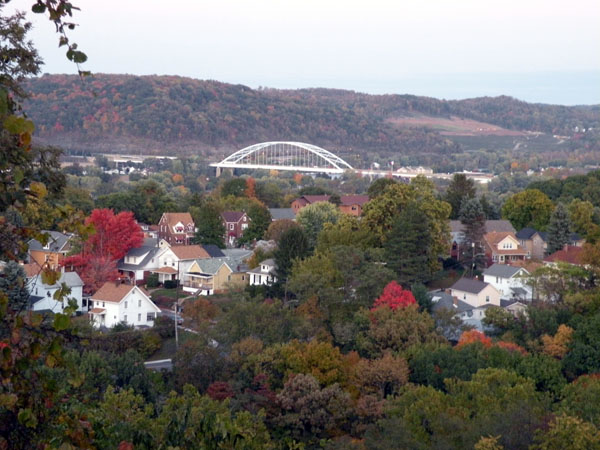
The Neville Island Bridge as viewed from a hill in Coraopolis

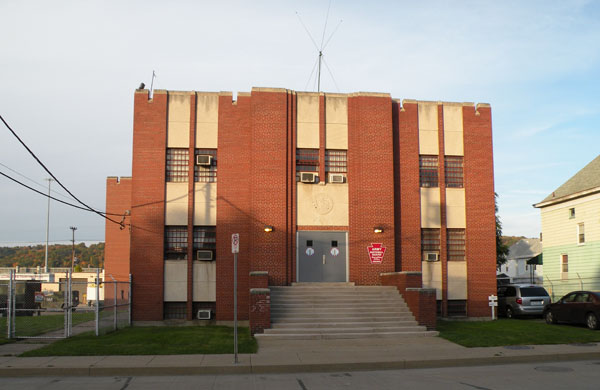
Coraopolis Armory
