= Cornell School District (Allegheny County, Pennsylvania) =

School district in Pennsylvania, USA

- Map of Allegheny County, Pennsylvania School Districts with Cornell School District in light green in western Allegheny County.

Address
- 1099 Maple Street Coraopolis, Allegheny, Pennsylvania, 15108; United States
- Coordinates: 40.507915°N 80.162968°W

District information
- Type: Public
- Motto: Pursuing Excellence in Public Education
- Grades: K-12
- Established: 1972; 54 years ago

Students and staff
- District mascot: Raiders
- Colors: Blue and Gold

Other information
- Website: www.cornellsd.org

Cornell School District is a diminutive, suburban public school district in Allegheny County, Pennsylvania. The district encompasses approximately 2 square miles. According to 2000 federal census data, it serves a resident population of 7,363. In 2009, the district residents' per capita income was $17,935, while the median family income was $41,497. It serves students in the Pittsburgh suburbs of Coraopolis and Neville Township.

Cornell School District operates 2 schools: Cornell Elementary (K-6) and Cornell High School which serves 7-12th grade. In 2010 the high school and junior high school were combined for administration purposes. Cornell School District Educational Center is located on one campus in Coraopolis with separate wings for elementary and secondary instruction. The climate-controlled building includes a gymnasium, auditorium, and pool. Separate libraries fulfill the different needs of elementary and secondary students. The elementary and secondary cafeterias serve both breakfast and lunch.
The professional staff has an average of 9 years teaching experience, and 40 percent of the teachers have advanced degrees. The district's class sizes average about 20 students and a staff/pupil ratio of 14 to one.

== Extracurriculars ==
The district offers a variety of clubs, activities and sports.

=== Athletics ===
The interscholastic athletic program provides high-level competition in both team and individual sports. Interscholastic sports are those in which students compete against teams or individuals from other school districts. Athletic activities are offered at the junior high school, 9th grade, junior varsity, and varsity levels. Some sports do not offer competition in all four levels.

- Boys: Baseball, Basketball, Cross-Country, Football, Golf, Swimming, Track, and Soccer.
- Girls: Basketball, Cross-Country, Golf, Soccer, Softball, Swimming, Track, and Volleyball.

The Pennsylvania Interscholastic Athletic Association (P.I.A.A.) governs high school interscholastic sports programs in Pennsylvania. As a member the district, follows the policies and regulations formulated by the association. Additional information regarding the athletic program is available from the athletic director.

=== Activities and clubs ===
Students are offered a number of extracurricular experiences. Students can participate in the band beginning in seventh grade. Other activities include a student newspaper, yearbook, Key Club, National Honor Society, junior high and high school student councils, and class plays.
