= Pittsburgh, Chartiers & Youghiogheny Railroad Bridge =

PC&Y Railroad Bridge
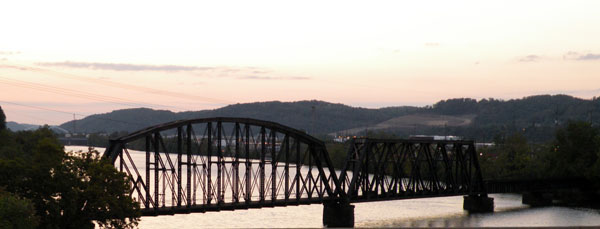
- Coordinates: 40°29′31″N 80°04′55″W
- Carries: 1 rail line
- Crosses: Ohio River
- Locale: Neville Township, Pennsylvania and Stowe Township, Pennsylvania

Characteristics
- Design: Pennsylvania-Petit Pratt through truss; subdivided Double Warren through truss; two deck girder spans
- Total length: 920 ft
- Longest span: 280 ft
- Clearance below: 7 ft est.

History
- Opened: 1894

The PC&Y Railroad Bridge carries a single railroad track over the Ohio River, between Stowe Township, Pennsylvania and Neville Island, Pennsylvania.

== Description ==
Built in 1894, this through truss railroad bridge once served the Pittsburgh, Chartiers & Youghiogheny Railroad. Previously used for the PC&Y's transport of tinplate scrap from Pittsburgh's Federal Street station to Neville Island, it spans the back channel of the Ohio River, and is still in use today. A single rail line crosses the bridge, connecting chemical plants on the industrial half of the island with the Pittsburgh and Ohio Central Railroad mainline.
