= Neville Island Bridge =

Bridge in Allegheny County, Pennsylvania

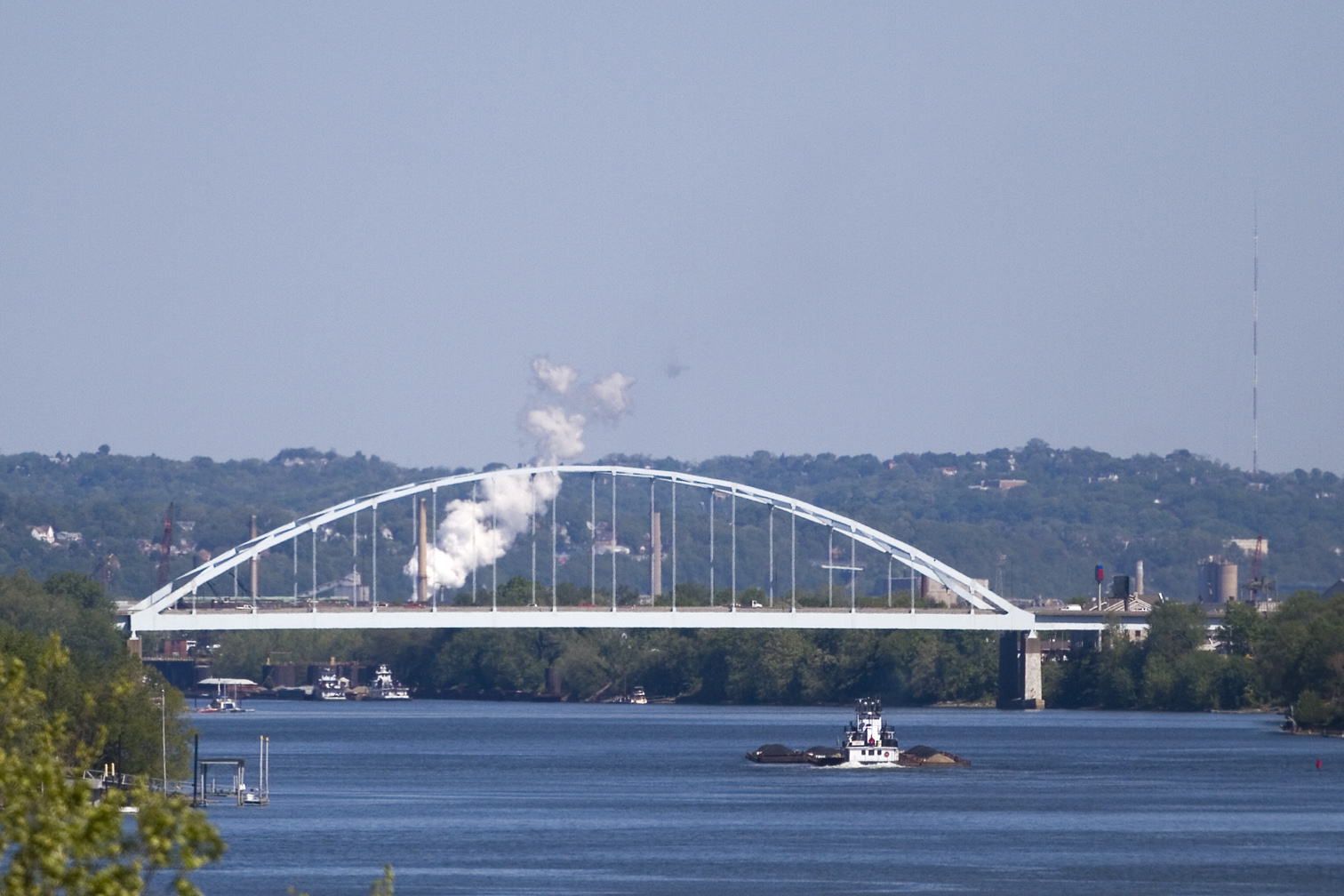
- The bridge in 2010
- Coordinates: 40.5133°N 80.1347°W
- Carries: 6 lanes of I-79
- Crosses: Ohio River and Neville Island, Pennsylvania
- Locale: Between Glenfield, Pennsylvania, Neville Township, Pennsylvania and Robinson Township, Allegheny County, Pennsylvania.
- Official name: Pittsburgh Naval & Shipbuilders Memorial Bridge 1941–1945

Characteristics
- Design: Steel bowstring arch bridge
- Longest span: 725 feet
- Clearance below: 68 feet

History
- Opened: 1976

Location
- Interactive map of Neville Island Bridge

The Neville Island Bridge is a tied arch bridge which carries Interstate 79 and the Yellow Belt across the Ohio River and over Neville Island, west of Pittsburgh, Pennsylvania.

== History ==
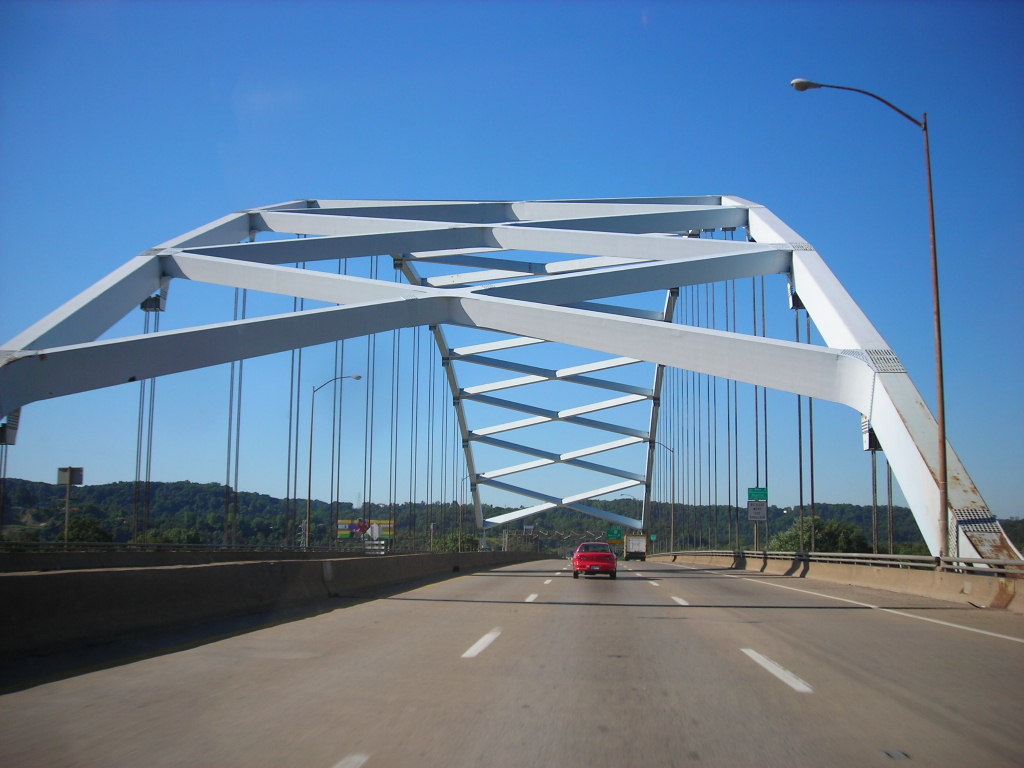
Deck of the bridge in 2006

Opening in 1976, after five years of construction, the Neville Island Bridge was the last link to finish on the 180 mile long I-79. It is also the second longest single spanning bridge in Allegheny County. The engineers, affiliated with the Pennsylvania Department of Transportation (PennDot), developed the bridge with a 125' arch.

In 1977, a crack was discovered in the bridge, causing it to sag about six feet. The bridge was immediately closed to traffic and remained closed until repairs could be performed. It was determined that the crack was not due to poor bridge design, but due to a failed weld.

During 2010 PennDot completed a $20.8 million improvement of I-79, Neville Island Bridge as well as other intersections.

A new restoration project formally began in August 2021; lane closures had been in effect on the northbound lanes since June. PennDOT contracted The Trumbull Corporation to complete the repairs at a cost of $43 million USD. Renovations include structural steel repairs, full structure painting, bearing and deck joint replacements, deck repairs and overlays, bridge barrier repair, substructure concrete work and drainage improvements. Work on the southbound lanes is expected to commence in 2022. The project includes long-term closure of the entrance ramp to I-79 from Grand Avenue, detoured via Neville Island, the Coraopolis Bridge, Pennsylvania Route 51 South, and to Exit 64. The on ramp has since reopened.

== See also ==
- List of crossings of the Ohio River
