= Coraopolis Armory =

- U.S. National Register of Historic Places
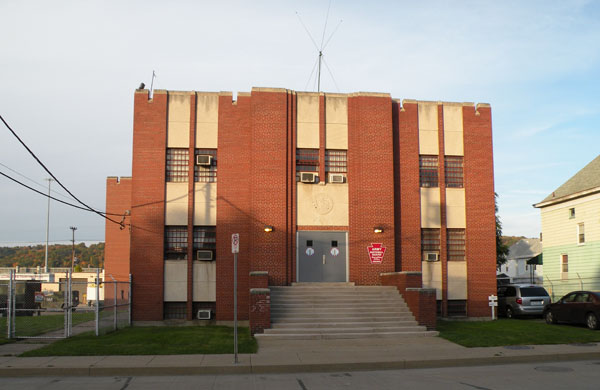

- Location within Pennsylvania Location within the United States
- Location: 835 5th Avenue, Coraopolis, Pennsylvania
- Coordinates: 40°31′10.03″N 80°10′7.82″W
- Built: 1938
- Architect: Thomas Roy Hinckley
- Architectural style: Moderne
- NRHP reference No.: 91001695
- Added to NRHP: November 14, 1991

Coraopolis Armory is an armory designed by architect Thomas Roy Hinckley and located at 835 5th Avenue in Coraopolis, Pennsylvania. It was built in 1938, and was added to the National Register of Historic Places on November 14, 1991.

The Pennsylvania National Guard took custody of the building on December 10, 1938. The previous armory was floated down the Ohio and Monongahela Rivers.

It houses the Headquarters Company, 28th Signal Battalion, Pennsylvania National Guard Army Reserve.
