= Neville Township, Pennsylvania =

Township in Pennsylvania, US

Neville Township
- Township
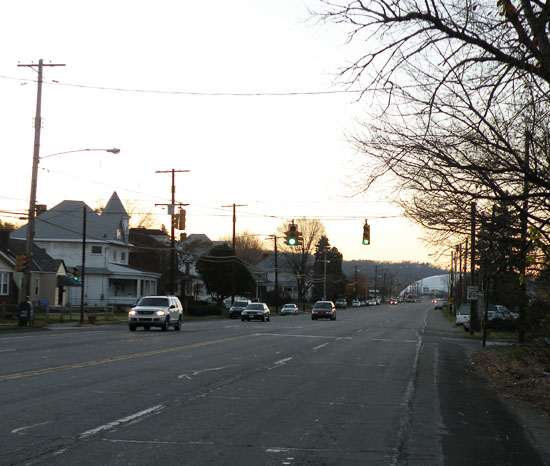
- A view of Grand Avenue, Neville Island, Pennsylvania, on November 14, 2009.

- Location in Allegheny County and state of Pennsylvania
- Coordinates: 40°30′21″N 80°6′33″W
- Country: United States
- State: Pennsylvania
- County: Allegheny
- Incorporated: April 8, 1854
- Named for: John Neville (general)

Area
  - Total: 2.34 sq mi (6.07 km^{2})
  - Land: 1.53 sq mi (3.97 km^{2})
  - Water: 0.81 sq mi (2.11 km^{2})

Population (2020)
  - Total: 1,108
  - Estimate (2022): 1,079
  - Density: 690.4/sq mi (266.56/km^{2})
- Time zone: UTC-5 (EST)
  - Summer (DST): UTC-4 (EDT)
- ZIP code: 15225
- Area code: 412
- FIPS code: 42-003-53136
- Website: https://nevilletownship.us/

Neville Township is a township in Allegheny County, Pennsylvania, United States. Its land area consists entirely of Neville Island, which is an island on the Ohio River. The population was 1,108 at the 2020 census.

== History ==
The island was formerly known as Montour's Island, named for the Native American interpreter Andrew Montour, who lived on the land in colonial times. Before the American Revolution, the island was claimed by both Pennsylvania and Virginia. Both states awarded a claim to the island to citizens of their states. The dispute found its way to the Supreme Court in Irvine v. Sims's Lessee (1799). Charles Simms won the case and gained possession of the island. It was eventually transferred to his partner in the lawsuit, General John Neville, for whom the island, and the township, is named. Neville lived on the island in his final years.

The township was incorporated on April 8, 1854, from a part of Ohio Township. It obtained first-class status in 1901.

A 1903 newspaper advertisement for real estate on the island promoted it as the next Manhattan Island.

== Island Sports Center ==
In 1998, the Hillman Company built the Island Sports Center on the western tip of Neville Island. Robert Morris University purchased the Island Sports Center in 2003. The sports center includes a 1,200-seat hockey rink, a golf range, a miniature golf course, athletic fields and a pro shop.

== Geography ==
The township boundary encompasses Neville Island and a surrounding portion of the Ohio River. According to the United States Census Bureau, the township has a total area of 2.2 square miles (5.7 km^{2}), of which 1.3 square miles (3.4 km^{2}) is land and 0.9 square miles (2.3 km^{2}) (40.36%) is water. The island, nearly five miles long, is the largest by land area in Pennsylvania.

== Government and politics ==
Presidential election results
Year	Republican	Democratic	Third parties
2020	50% 286	48% 276	1% 8
2016	50% 260	44% 225	6% 31
2012	48% 245	52% 267	1% 3

== Adjacent neighborhoods ==
Across the Ohio River's back channel, Neville Township runs adjacent with (from northwest to southeast) Coraopolis (with direct link via Coraopolis Bridge), Robinson Township, Kennedy Township and Stowe Township (with direct link via Fleming Park Bridge).

Across the river's main channel, Neville Township runs adjacent with (from northwest to southeast) Haysville, Glenfield (with the Neville Island Bridge as the direct link), Kilbuck Township, Emsworth, Ben Avon and Avalon.

The Neville Island Bridge carries Interstate 79 and the Yellow Belt across the Ohio River and over Neville Island, west of Pittsburgh. The island is approximately a 15-minute drive from Pittsburgh, depending on driving conditions and other such factors.

== Demographics ==
Historical population
Census	Pop.	Note	%±
1860	236		—
1870	289		22.5%
1880	306		5.9%
1890	353		15.4%
1900	758		114.7%
1910	634		−16.4%
1920	1,272		100.6%
1930	1,532		20.4%
1940	1,469		−4.1%
1950	2,310		57.2%
1960	2,400		3.9%
1970	2,017		−16.0%
1980	1,416		−29.8%
1990	1,273		−10.1%
2000	1,232		−3.2%
2010	1,084		−12.0%
2022 (est.)	1,079
U.S. Decennial Census

As of the 2000 census, there were 1,232 people, 624 households, and 313 families residing in the township. The population density was 929.4 inhabitants per square mile (358.8/km^{2}). There were 676 housing units at an average density of 510.0 per square mile (196.9/km^{2}). The racial makeup of the township was 97.32% White, 1.22% Black or African American, 0.08% Native American, 0.32% from other races, and 1.06% from two or more races. Hispanic or Latino of any race were largely irrelevant.

There were 624 households, out of which 20.4% had children under the age of 18 living with them, 34.8% were married couples living together, 11.2% had a female householder with no husband present, and 49.7% were non-families. 43.8% of all households were made up of individuals, and 18.3% had someone living alone who was 65 years of age or older. The average household size was 1.97 and the average family size was 2.75.

In the township the population was spread out, with 18.3% under the age of 18, 9.0% from 18 to 24, 27.4% from 25 to 44, 23.3% from 45 to 64, and 22.0% who were 65 years of age or older. The median age was 42 years. For every 100 females, there were 94.9 males. For every 100 females age 18 and over, there were 89.6 males.

The median income for a household in the township was $30,625, and the median income for a family was $44,083. Males had a median income of $31,827 versus $26,838 for females. The per capita income for the township was $19,630. About 4.6% of families and 9.7% of the population were below the poverty line, including 8.6% of those under age 18 and 11.4% of those age 65 or over.

== Gallery ==
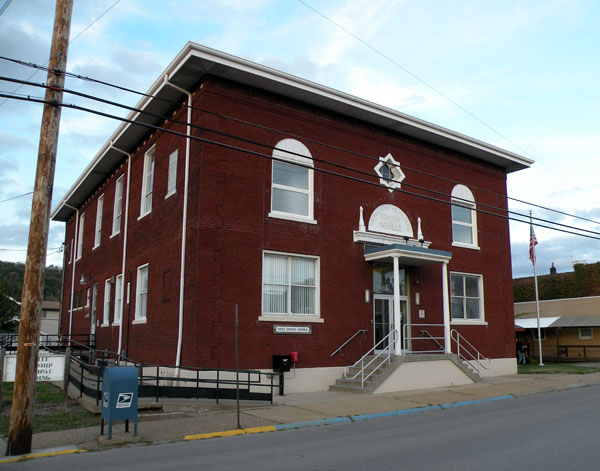
Neville Township Municipal Building, located at 5050 Grand Avenue.

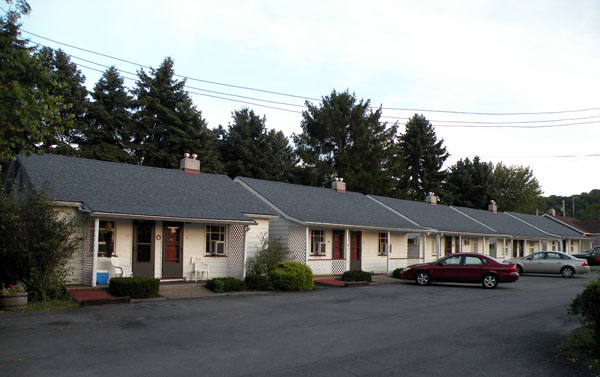
The Neville Motel Bungalows, probably date back to the 1940s or 1950s, located near the corner of Neville Road and Grand Avenue.

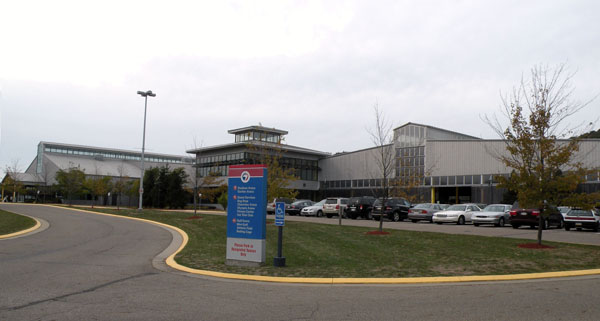
Island Sports Center, built in 1998, located at 7600 Grand Avenue.

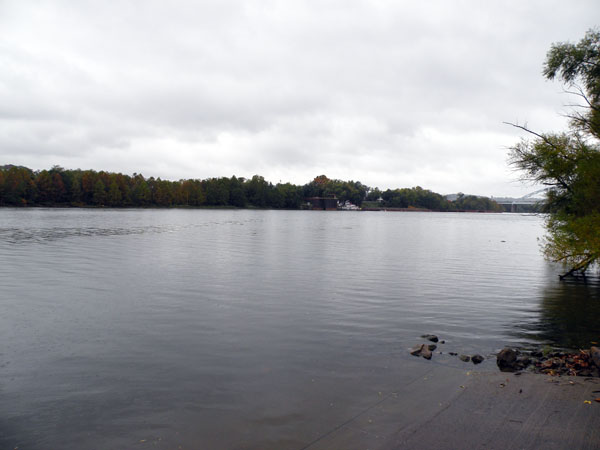
A portion of Neville Island, PA, on October 17, 2009.

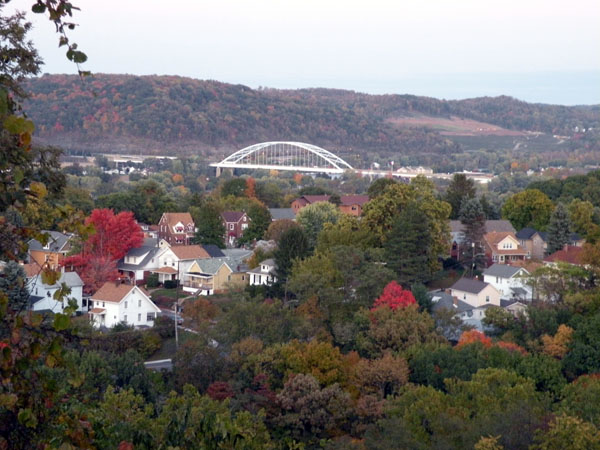
The Neville Island Bridge, opened in 1976.

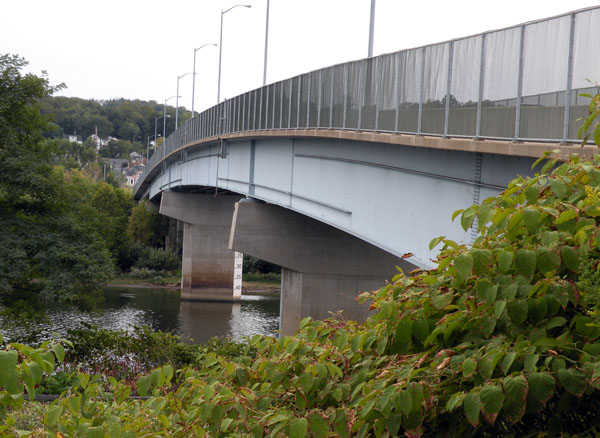
The Coraopolis-Neville Island Bridge, which opened in 1995, replaced the former Coraopolis Bridge.

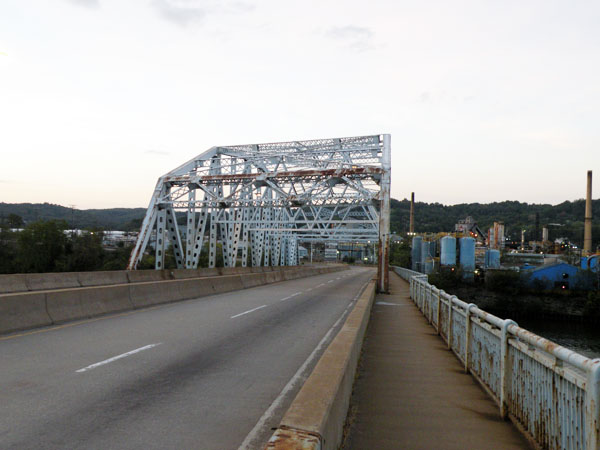
The Fleming Park Bridge, built in 1955.

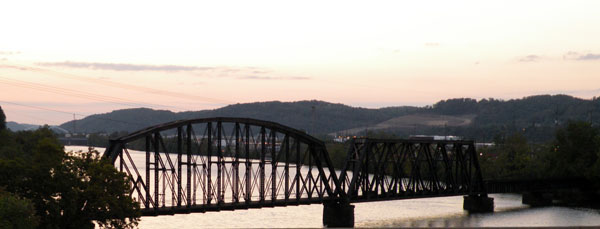
The PC&Y Railroad Bridge, built in 1894.

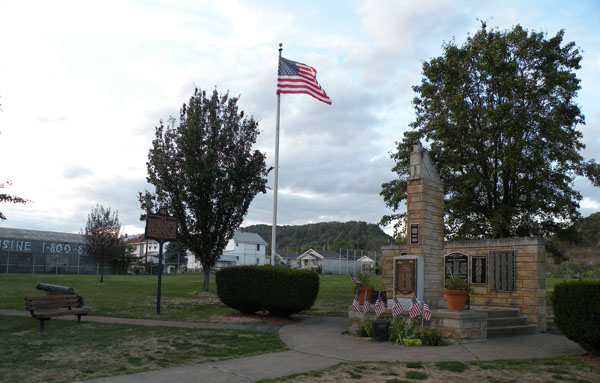
The Neville Township Memorial in Memorial Park on Grand Avenue.

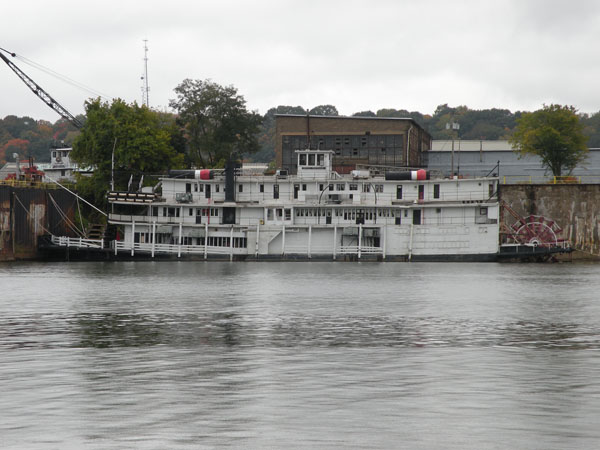
The Becky Thatcher docked on Neville Island on October 17, 2009.
