= Coraopolis Bridge =

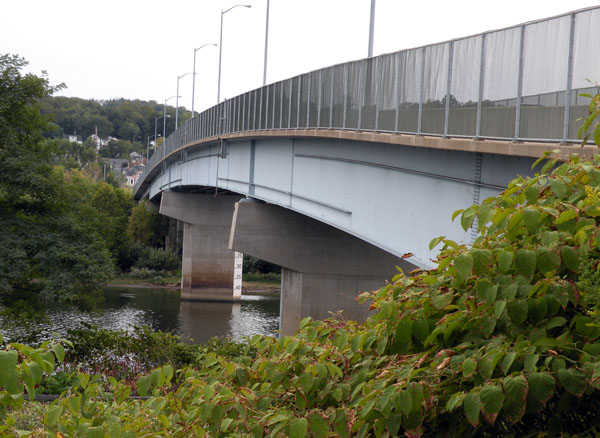
- The current bridge
- Coordinates: 40°30′58″N 80°09′07″W
- Carries: PA 51 (Coraopolis)/ Grand Avenue (Neville Township)
- Crosses: Ohio River back channel at mile 9.6, CSX (formerly PLE railway )
- Locale: Coraopolis, Pennsylvania, U.S.
- Official name: Neville Island – Coraopolis Bridge
- Maintained by: Allegheny County, Pennsylvania

Characteristics
- Design: Stringer girder bridge
- Total length: 1,108 ft (338 m)
- Longest span: 199 ft
- Clearance below: 45 ft

History
- Opened: 1995

Location
- Interactive map of Coraopolis Bridge

Coraopolis Bridge (formerly the Pittsburgh Sixth Street Bridge)
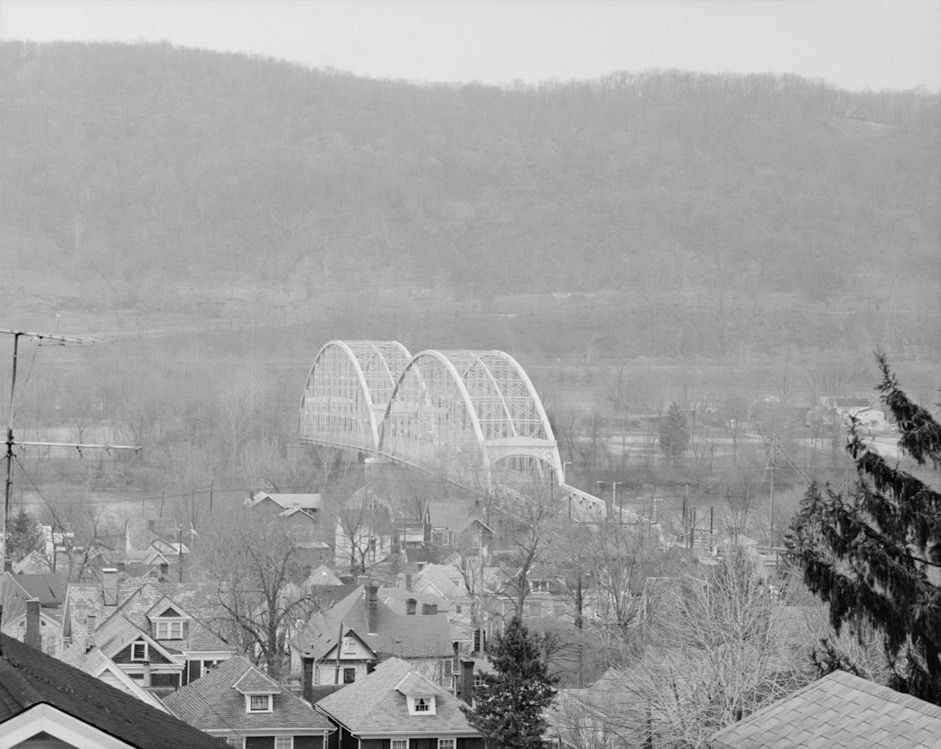
- Overall view from Coraopolis side
- Coordinates: 40°30′58″N 80°09′07″W
- Carries: Grand Avenue (Neville Twp)/Pennsylvania Route 51 (Coraopolis)
- Crosses: Ohio River back channel at mile 9.6, CSX (formerly PLE railway )
- Locale: Coraopolis, Pennsylvania
- Official name: Neville Island – Coraopolis Bridge
- Maintained by: Allegheny County, Pennsylvania

Characteristics
- Design: 2 Pratt/Bowstring/Pennsylvania through truss main spans, 2 pony truss side spans
- Longest span: 2x 439 ft
- Clearance below: 45.5 ft

History
- Opened: 1892 (original location); October 5, 1927 (this location)
- Closed: 1986, replaced 1995
- Coraopolis Bridge
- U.S. National Register of Historic Places
- Location within Pennsylvania Location within the United States
- Location: Ohio River Back Channel at Ferree St. and Grand Ave., Coraopolis, Pennsylvania
- Built: 1892
- Architect: Theodore Cooper, Baird Bros.
- Architectural style: Bowstring Truss
- MPS: Allegheny County Owned River Bridges TR
- NRHP reference No.: 86000021
- Added to NRHP: January 7, 1986

Location
- Interactive map of Coraopolis Bridge (formerly the Pittsburgh Sixth Street Bridge)

The Coraopolis Bridge ^{[1]} is a girder bridge over the back channel of the Ohio River connecting Grand Avenue on Neville Island to Ferree Street in Coraopolis, Pennsylvania. It opened in 1995 to replace a structure of historic significance. The original Pratt/Bowstring/Pennsylvania^{[2]} through truss spans, designed by Theodore Cooper, were formerly the (third) Sixth Street Bridge, spanning the Allegheny River, in downtown Pittsburgh, and were built in 1892 by the Union Bridge Company. They were floated downstream by the Foundation Company in 1927 rather than being demolished when the bridge was removed to enable construction of the present (fourth) Three Sisters (Pittsburgh) Sixth Street Self-anchored suspension bridge. However, by the late 1980s, the old bridge could no longer support traffic volumes and was replaced by a newer structure.

== Sixth Street bridges ==
The through truss spans incorporated in the present Coraopolis Bridge were originally erected across the Allegheny River at Sixth Street in Pittsburgh, linking Pittsburgh with the main business thoroughfare of neighboring Allegheny City. This was the third of four bridges to serve that location, which is considered among Pittsburgh's most important river crossings. The growth of Pittsburgh was strongly influenced by its numerous waterways, and the successful linking of the city with its neighboring communities by means of bridges was a significant factor in the development of its metropolitan identity. Allegheny City was annexed by Pittsburgh in 1907, becoming the city's "North Side".

=== First Sixth Street Bridge ===
The first bridge to cross the Allegheny at Sixth Street was a six-span, flat-roofed, covered wooden bridge constructed in 1819. This bridge had a total length of 1,037 feet (316 m), consisting of four 185-foot (56 m) spans, a 170-foot (52 m) span, and a 137-foot (42 m) span. The design and construction of this bridge have traditionally been attributed to a Mr. Lothrop; it was presumably a Burr arch truss, like the Ninth (Hand) Street Bridge, another of Lothrop's products. Physical evidence for this assumption survived until the 1890s, when an observer reported that the skewbacks from the wooden arches remained visible in the north abutment.

=== Second Sixth Street Bridge ===
In 1860, a wire-suspension bridge, designed by John A. Roebling, replaced the decaying timber structure. This bridge was four spans long, with two 344-foot (105 m) main spans, and approach spans measuring 177 and 171 feet (54 and 52 m) each. The bridge was dominated by cast iron towers, each formed by four cast iron columns.

Although the Roebling bridge, with its iron superstructure, was generally believed non-flammable, it fell victim to fire on June 19, 1881. The bridge was not destroyed, but its floor system of white pine and white oak was severely damaged. John Harper, president of the Allegheny Bridge Company, which owned and operated the structure, stated that he believed the fire was the result of "sparks and perhaps flame from the stacks" of passing steamboats igniting bird nests located under the superstructure of the bridge. After heavy electric streetcars were introduced to the bridge in 1890, concern over its functional capacity grew, and in 1891 plans were begun to replace the suspension bridge with one that could better handle the steadily increasing traffic, as well as permit trolleys to cross without reducing their speed.

=== Third Sixth Street Bridge ===
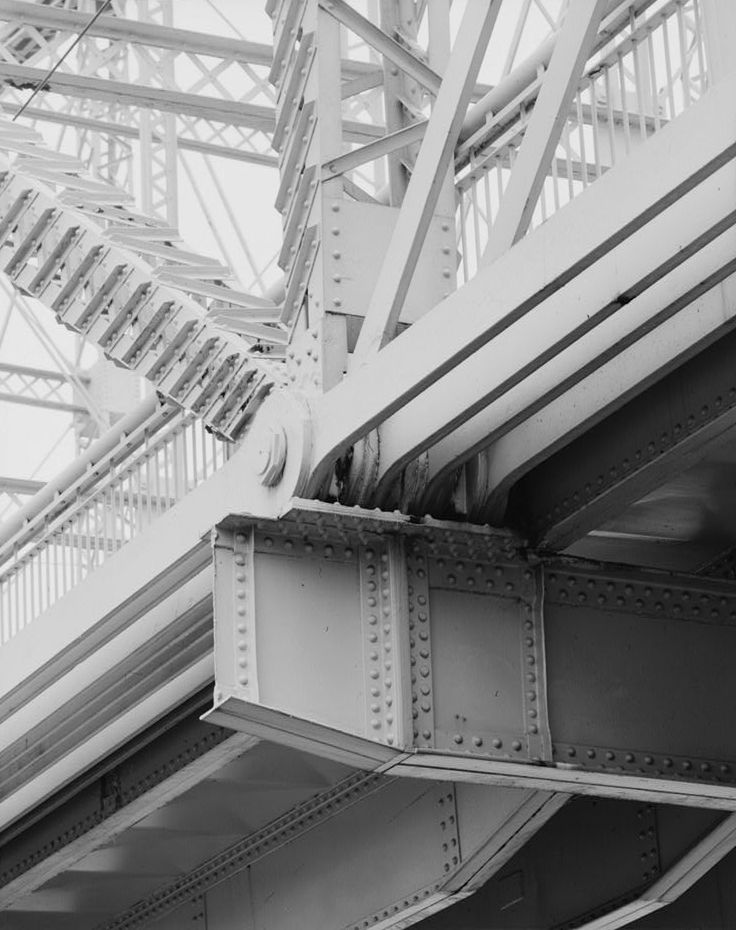
Coraopolis Bridge, from below deck, showing deck girders, eyebar tension members, lattice girders of truss superstructure

The third Sixth Street Bridge was designed by the nationally significant engineer Theodore Cooper (1839–1919). This bridge has been identified as the last surviving structure entirely designed by Cooper, whose involvement extended even to such details as the bridge's handrail, lamps, and fascia.

The third Sixth Street Bridge, like most roadway river bridges in the 19th century, was privately built and operated as a toll crossing. The total cost of construction was $560,000. This cost was underwritten by the Sixth Street Bridge Company and Fidelity Title and Trust Company, successors to the Allegheny Bridge Company, which had received its charter in 1810. When the bridge was opened in 1893, the toll was set at two cents for each man, while women crossed at no charge. Beginning in the late 1890s, Allegheny County and the City of Pittsburgh undertook a systematic program of acquiring the privately owned bridges within their jurisdiction and eliminating their tolls. The Sixth Street Bridge was purchased by Allegheny County in 1911 along with nine other bridges at the combined price of $2,851,000; all ten of these bridges were subsequently declared free.

The trusses for the third Sixth Street Bridge were fabricated by the Union Bridge Company. This company had been formed in 1884 by the merging of the Central Bridge Company of Buffalo, New York, and Kellogg and Maurice of Athens, Pennsylvania. The Buffalo plant was closed around 1890, so presumably the trusses were produced in the shops which remained at Athens.

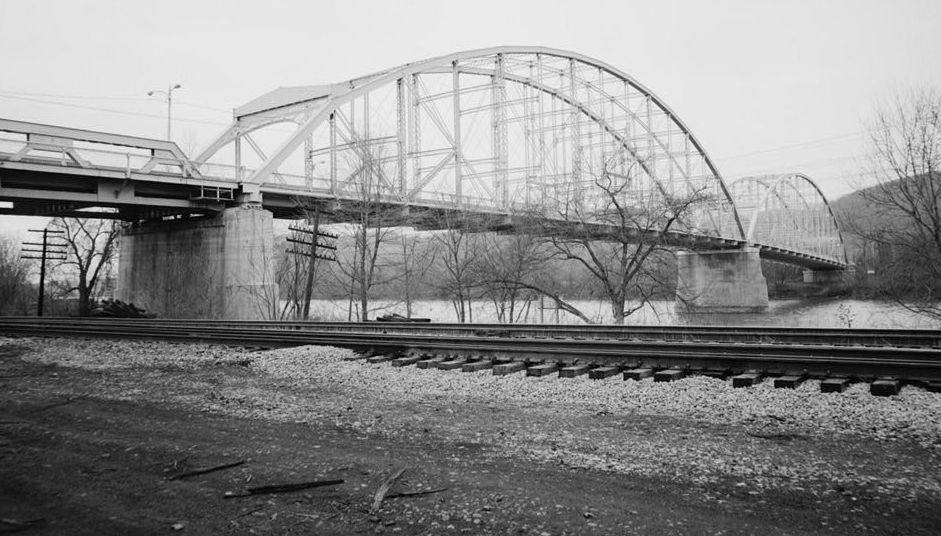
Coraopolis Bridge with newer pony truss at left, from SE (Coraopolis side)

The superstructure was erected by the Baird Brothers, John and William, who first advertised in the Pittsburgh and Allegheny City Directory in 1886 as contractors located at Home and Valley Streets. In the 1891 and 1892 editions of the Directory they were listed as bridge builders; their listings no longer appeared by 1900, and by 1911 William Baird had left the construction business and had begun managing a hotel.

The Baird Brothers had been involved with numerous bridge projects and companies in the late nineteenth century. William Baird had worked on seven bridges crossing the Missouri River, the Merchants Bridge across the Mississippi River at St. Louis, two bridges crossing the Ohio River at Wheeling, West Virginia, the bridge carrying the Baltimore and Ohio Railroad across the Susquehanna River, and bridges at Steubenville, Ohio, and Poughkeepsie, New York. John Baird had also been involved in the construction of the Eads Bridge in St. Louis and the Cairo bridge in Memphis, and was employed by the McCann Construction Company, the Keystone Bridge Company, and American Bridge Company.

This bridge was also outgrown.

While the Pittsburgh City Council and the Municipal Affairs Committee of the Pittsburgh Chamber of Commerce argued for the retention and upgrading of the existing bridges, the issue was ultimately decided by the Department of War, acting under the authority of Section 18 of the Rivers and Harbors Act of March 3, 1890 (30 Stat., 1121–1153). This act empowered the Secretary of War to require the removal or alteration of any bridge which " ... is an unreasonable obstruction to the free navigation . . . on account of insufficient height, width of span, or otherwise". So, unfortunately, the War Department decreed that the numerous bridges over the Allegheny with their differing spacing of piers, main spans, and generally low clearances, were an impediment to navigation, and decreed that all bridges would have to be replaced. Although the decree was discussed in the early 1900s, and first issued in 1917, serious work did not begin till 1924. As part of the Three Sisters (Pittsburgh) project, the bridges at Sixth, Seventh, and Ninth Streets were to be demolished and replaced. The other two bridges were destroyed and scrapped, but the Cooper Bowstring trusses were moved to Coraopolis and reused.

== Moving the Sixth Street Bridge to Coraopolis ==
Note: The material in this section is taken from a different HAER report.^{[4]}

The 1892 Sixth Street Bridge (as described above, a pair of camelback Pratt trusses and the third bridge built in this location) had a second chance. In 1927, it was lowered from its piers, the top chords partially disassembled. The structure was floated downriver to a new location over the Ohio River back channel between Coraopolis and Neville Island to make way for the current Sixth Street Bridge structure.

=== A forced opportunity ===
The Cooper spans remained in good shape, and concerns for economizing in public works projects led to recycling of the 1892 bridge. Commissioner Armstrong took credit for proposing to reuse the Cooper bridge instead of building an entirely new structure in nearby Coraopolis, saving Allegheny County $350,000. The Foundation Company bid on a contract to move the Sixth Street Bridge from its site in downtown Pittsburgh to Coraopolis, twelve miles away. Winning the contract at a bid of $316,200, the company also assumed any risk that the spans would sink or be damaged during the project. The company allowed pedestrians to cross the structure while roadway removal proceeded in the fall of 1926 in order to reduce the inconvenience for residents. Workers took off half of the roadway at a time, leaving pedestrian areas accessible until final segments were taken away

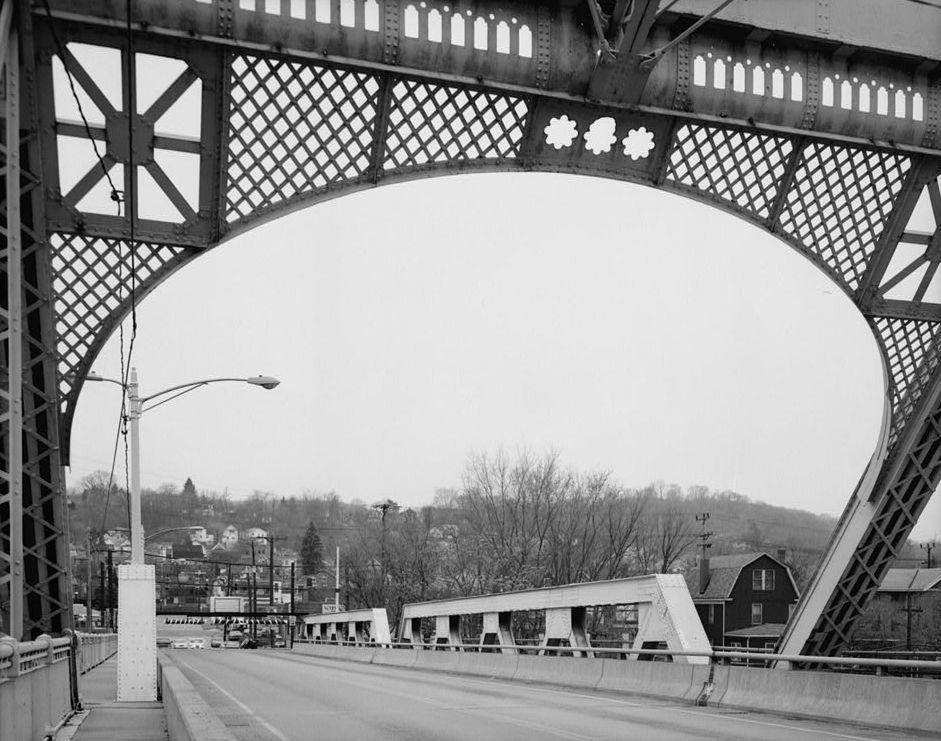
Coraopolis Bridge with newer pony trusses in background, filigree work and decorative mesh of arched openings in foreground. Built up compression girder members at side, and tie rod bracing also visible at top of arch

=== Removal process ===
The bowstring trusses, in addition to weighing 1,600 tons each, presented the difficult problem of being slightly too tall to fit under two bridges along the journey. Because of the stresses inherent in a bowstring truss, the Foundation Company could not merely disassemble them; instead, the firm had to transport the entire 450-foot (140 m) spans, which were 44 feet (13 m) wide and 80 feet (24 m) high.

Each truss consisted of sixteen eye-bar panels pinned together. Removing one part would break the structure's rigidity and make moving it very difficult. Instead of shifting the spans off piers for lowering or pivoting them from their present support, the Foundation Company lowered the structure in position, taking off the masonry and using substitute supports for resting the structure without getting in the way of the process. The contractor attached a frame to each of the piers and abutments, used straps to bind the trusses to each frame, and lowered them using the straps.

With twenty-six 7-inch (18 cm) holes punched in the strap, the company used a matching chain to counter the eight straps. Using pins to move the strap by hole sets, the company brought the spans downward 15 inches (38 cm) at a time with jacks. The pins attached to the plungers of eight 500-ton jacks. The jacks remained in place while the pins moved 15 inches (38 cm). The water-cylinder jacks were also 15 inches (38 cm) high, capable of exerting 3,200 pounds per square inch (22 MPa) after pumping. By bleeding water out of the cylinders of the jacks all at once, workers used the four jacks on each side of the bridge to lower the spans on alternate sides to the full depth of 16 feet (4.9 m).

=== Transport ===
Workers made a pontoon out of two pairs of barges, spaced to create a platform 400 feet (120 m) long and 52 feet (16 m) wide, which carried the bridge with 20 feet (6.1 m) of overhang.^{[5]} Stringers supported the bridge in forty-two places, with a 40-ton screw jack at each stringer for easier loading and unloading. When workers reached the Manchester Bridge, they had to adjust the bridge to fit the clearance, which was 14 feet (4.3 m) and 12 feet (3.7 m) less than the bridge's height. After supporting the bridge under the floor beams, they disassembled the top chord and stabilized each panel point on the trusses. Steering the bridge under the Manchester Bridge and the railroad bridge at Brunot's Island, the tugboat captains went through the Ohio River lock and up the back channel toward Coraopolis, where piers and abutments had been constructed.

=== Reassembly ===
Reversing the process and using the same jacks and steel frames to raise the structure 32 feet (9.8 m), the company erected the Cooper bridge 30 days after the project began.

The Farris Engineering Company, a Pittsburgh company located in the Empire Building, performed a great deal of work on the bridge at its new location. The original approved contract for their work had a price total of $271,811.50. They built portions of the substructure that the Foundation Company had not done. Farris also erected the two pony truss approach spans, repaired and painted the main superstructure, and paved the bridge deck and the two approaches.

The approach spans, and the end bearings for the main spans, were fabricated by the American Bridge Company at its shops located in Ambridge, Pennsylvania.

== End of life ==
Allegheny County ended up replacing the Coraopolis Bridge with a new bridge at this location. By the 1980s, due to its deteriorated condition and inadequate load carrying capacity, the four span truss bridge did not meet the transportation needs of its location.

After nearly 50 years of additional service, which included weight restrictions and closings during cold weather (for a time it was restricted to carrying vehicles with a maximum weight of three tons, and it was only open to vehicular traffic during periods when the temperature is above 30 degrees Fahrenheit), the old bridge was replaced by a deck girder bridge which was completed in 1995.

Thus, eventually it was closed, demolished, and replaced, ending a unique chapter in American bridge history.

== Current bridge at location ==
The current Coraopolis-Neville Island Bridge at this location (OB02) was built in 1994 and completed in 1995. This steel deck girder bridge spans the back channel of the Ohio River between Coraopolis, Pennsylvania, and Neville Township, Pennsylvania. The main span is approximately 199 feet (61 m), and the height of the deck is approximately 45 feet (14 m).

== See also ==
- List of bridges documented by the Historic American Engineering Record in Pennsylvania
- Three Sisters Bridges

== Notes ==
1. The town Coraopolis (and therefore the bridge) are sometimes referred to as Corapolis, that is, missing the 'O' between the 'A' and 'P', which can make searches somewhat difficult. For example, the HAER material is indexed this way although the HAER article text uses the spelling with the 'O'.
2. The trusses are conflictingly referred to in different sources as "Bowstring", "Pennsylvania" or "Pratt". Pratt is the most common name. Bowstring may refer to the shape of the bridge, it has some resemblance to a bow, with the roadway as the string (in this particular truss design instance, the members at the road level are eyebar, as can be seen in the belowdeck illustration, above, and thus are in tension only, which also may be why it's named that way) This tension only, pin joint construction is the major factor making the move difficult.
3. The HAER (Historic American Engineering Record) report gives an extensive history of the various bridges at the 6th street site, and of this bridge once moved. It is available in .tif form at external link #4, but Bruce S. Cridlebaugh of pghbridges.com has already scanned the text in. This text is available at external link #5.
4. The HAER (Historic American Engineering Record) report gives an extensive history of the various bridges at the 6th, 7th and 9th street sites, and some info on this bridge once moved. It is available in .tif form at external link #6, but Bruce S. Cridlebaugh of pghbridges.com has already scanned the text in. This text is available at external link #7.
5. This image shows the removal and barge loading process. This image (both from the pghbridges.com site) shows a truss loaded on the barge and being moved. The top chord has been disassembled to allow clearance of some bridges it must pass under.
