= Beaver County, Pennsylvania =

County in Pennsylvania, United States

- County
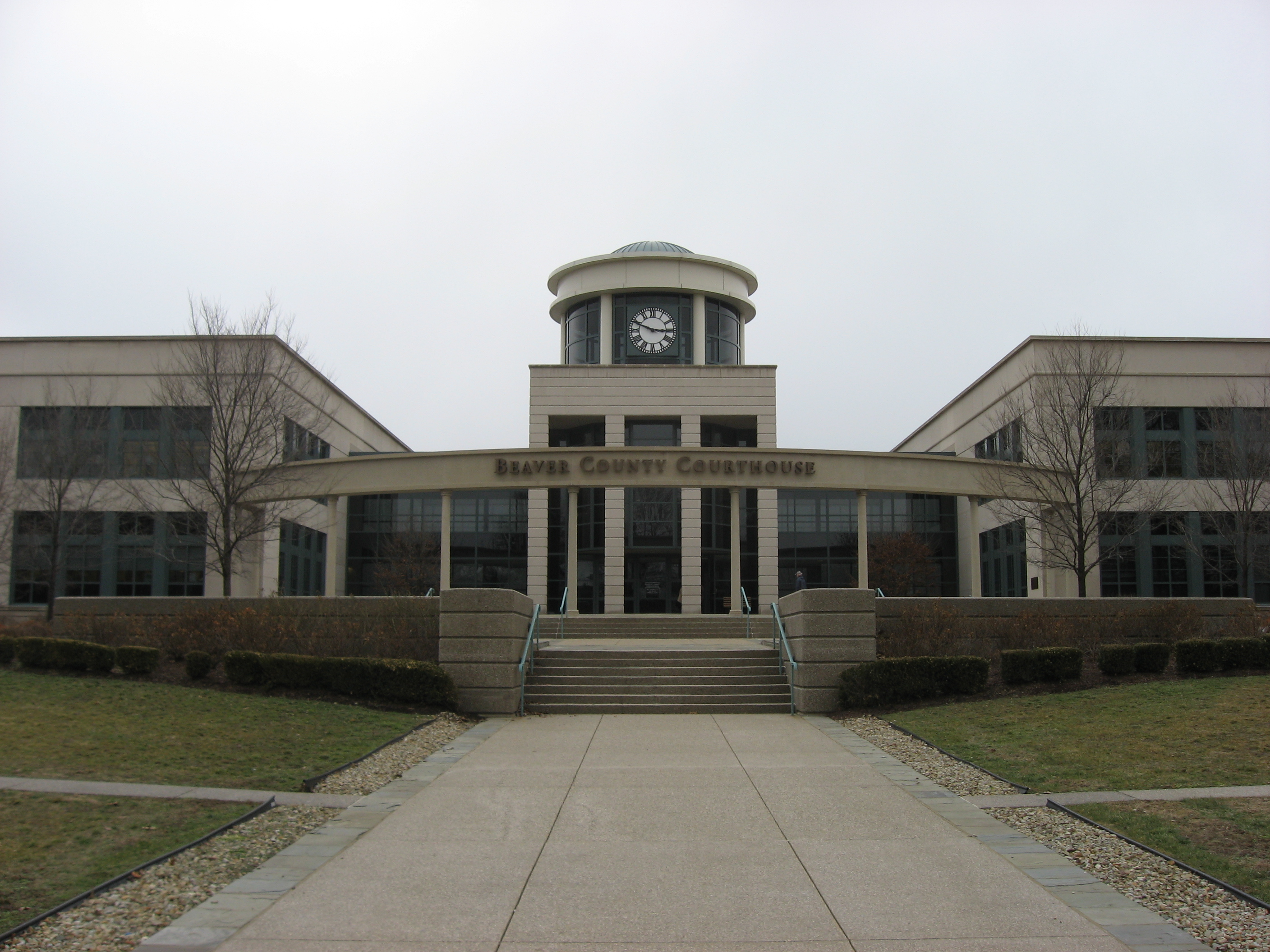
- Beaver County Courthouse

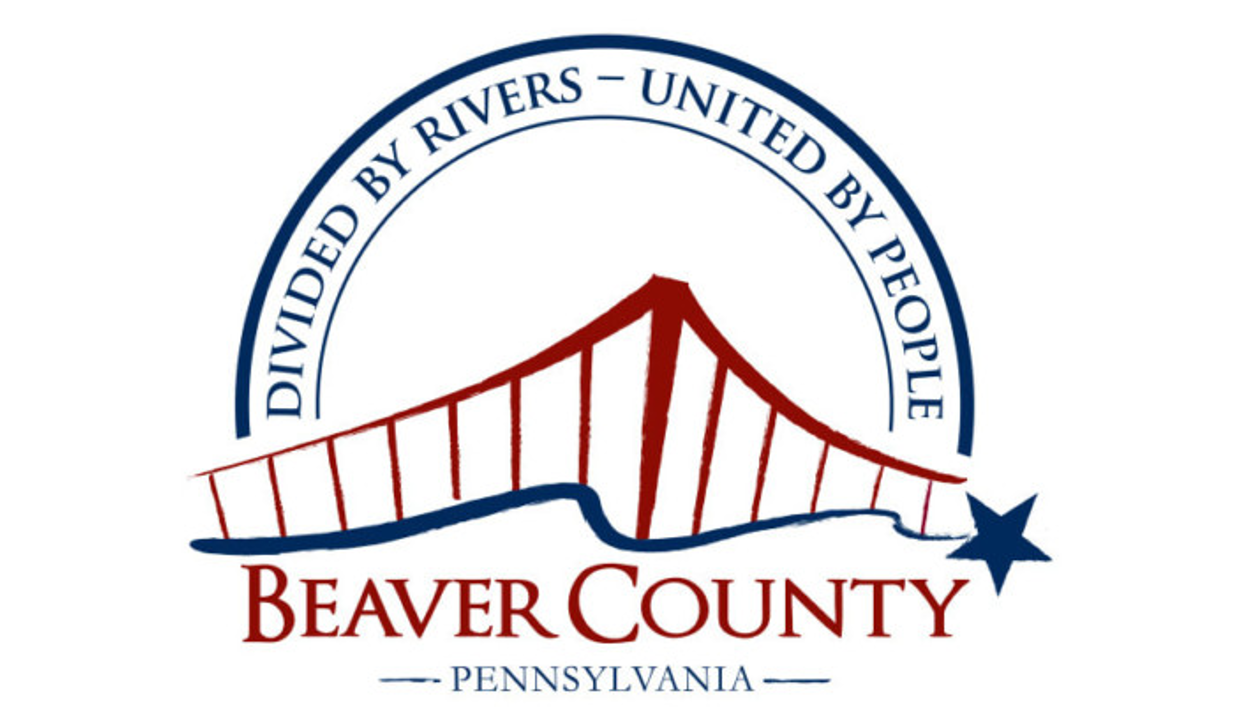
- Flag Seal Logo
- Motto: Divided by its Rivers, United by its People
- Location within the U.S. state of Pennsylvania
- Coordinates: 40°41′N 80°21′W
- Country: United States
- State: Pennsylvania
- Founded: March 12, 1800
- Named for: Beaver River
- Seat: Beaver
- Largest city: Aliquippa

Area
  - Total: 444 sq mi (1,150 km^{2})
  - Land: 435 sq mi (1,130 km^{2})
  - Water: 9.3 sq mi (24 km^{2}) 2.1%

Population (2020)
  - Total: 168,215
  - Estimate (2025): 166,032 ▼
  - Density: 387/sq mi (149/km^{2})
- Time zone: UTC−5 (Eastern)
  - Summer (DST): UTC−4 (EDT)
- Congressional district: 17th
- Website: www.beavercountypa.gov

Pennsylvania Historical Marker
- Designated: July 5, 1982

Beaver County is a county in the Commonwealth of Pennsylvania. As of the 2020 census, the population was 168,215. Its county seat is Beaver, and its largest city is Aliquippa. The county is part of the Greater Pittsburgh region of the commonwealth. (Note: Includes Allegheny, Washington, Butler, Beaver, Lawrence and Armstrong Counties)

== History ==
Beaver County was created on March 12, 1800, from parts of Allegheny and Washington counties. It took its name from the Beaver River.

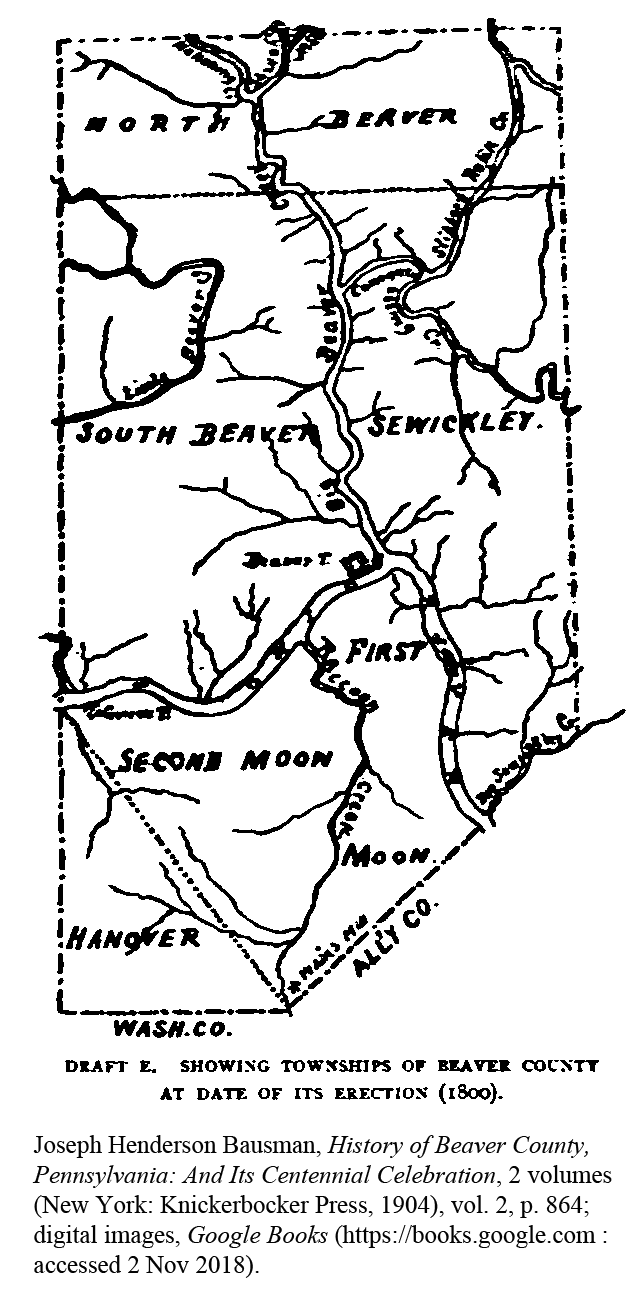
Original township in 1800

The original townships at the date of the erection of Beaver County in 1800 were North Beaver, in what would eventually become Lawrence County, east and west of the Big Beaver Creek; South Beaver, west of the Big Beaver; Sewickley, east of the Big Beaver—all north of the Ohio River; Hanover, in the southeastern corner of the county; and lastly, First Moon, and Second Moon, south of the Ohio.

== Geography ==
According to the U.S. Census Bureau, the county has a total area of 444 square miles (1,150 km^{2}), of which 435 square miles (1,130 km^{2}) is land and 9.3 square miles (24 km^{2}) (2.1%) is water. Beaver County has a hot-summer humid continental climate (Dfa). Average monthly temperatures in the Beaver/Rochester vicinity range from 29.4 °F in January to 73.2 °F in July. Beaver County is one of the 423 counties served by the Appalachian Regional Commission, and it is identified as part of the "Midlands" by Colin Woodard in his book American Nations: A History of the Eleven Rival Regional Cultures of North America.

=== Bodies of water ===
- The Ohio River flows north through Beaver County from a point near Ambridge, then turns west near Beaver and on to the Ohio and West Virginia borders. It divides the southern third of the county from the northern two-thirds.
- The Beaver River flows south from Lawrence County entering Beaver County near Koppel and continuing south to its confluence with the Ohio near Beaver.

=== Adjacent counties ===
- Lawrence County (north)
- Butler County (east)
- Allegheny County (southeast)
- Washington County (south)
- Hancock County, West Virginia (west)
- Columbiana County, Ohio (west)

=== Protected areas ===
- Phillis Island and Georgetown Island, part of the Ohio River Islands National Wildlife Refuge
- Raccoon Creek State Park
- Brady’s Run Park
- Brush Creek Park
- Buttermilk Falls Park
- Old Economy Park

== Demographics ==
Historical population
Census	Pop.	Note	%±
1800	5,776		—
1810	12,168		110.7%
1820	15,340		26.1%
1830	24,183		57.6%
1840	29,368		21.4%
1850	26,689		−9.1%
1860	29,140		9.2%
1870	36,148		24.0%
1880	39,605		9.6%
1890	50,077		26.4%
1900	56,432		12.7%
1910	78,253		38.7%
1920	111,621		42.6%
1930	149,062		33.5%
1940	156,754		5.2%
1950	175,192		11.8%
1960	206,948		18.1%
1970	208,418		0.7%
1980	204,441		−1.9%
1990	186,093		−9.0%
2000	181,412		−2.5%
2010	170,539		−6.0%
2020	168,215		−1.4%
2025 (est.)	166,032	▼	−1.3%

=== Racial and ethnic composition ===
Beaver County, Pennsylvania – Racial and ethnic composition Note: the US Census treats Hispanic/Latino as an ethnic category. This table excludes Latinos from the racial categories and assigns them to a separate category. Hispanics/Latinos may be of any race.
Race / Ethnicity (NH = Non-Hispanic)	Pop 1980	Pop 1990	Pop 2000	Pop 2010	Pop 2020	% 1980	% 1990	% 2000	% 2010	% 2020
White alone (NH)	191,263	173,870	167,018	154,196	143,881	93.55%	93.43%	92.07%	90.42%	85.53%
Black or African American alone (NH)	11,301	10,411	10,728	10,586	11,069	5.53%	5.59%	5.91%	6.21%	6.58%
Native American or Alaska Native alone (NH)	129	193	156	158	195	0.06%	0.10%	0.09%	0.09%	0.12%
Asian alone (NH)	409	370	450	717	1,022	0.20%	0.20%	0.25%	0.42%	0.61%
Native Hawaiian or Pacific Islander alone (NH)	x	x	19	32	53	x	x	0.01%	0.02%	0.03%
Other race alone (NH)	243	125	173	141	613	0.12%	0.07%	0.10%	0.08%	0.36%
Mixed race or Multiracial (NH)	x	x	1,553	2,711	7,771	x	x	0.86%	1.59%	4.62%
Hispanic or Latino (any race)	1,096	1,124	1,315	1,998	3,611	0.54%	0.60%	0.72%	1.17%	2.15%
Total	204,441	186,093	181,412	170,539	168,215	100.00%	100.00%	100.00%	100.00%	100.00%

=== 2020 census ===
As of the 2020 census, the county had a population of 168,215. The median age was 45.6 years. 19.1% of residents were under the age of 18 and 22.2% of residents were 65 years of age or older. For every 100 females there were 96.1 males, and for every 100 females age 18 and over there were 94.1 males age 18 and over.

The racial makeup of the county was 86.2% White, 6.6% Black or African American, 0.1% American Indian and Alaska Native, 0.6% Asian, <0.1% Native Hawaiian and Pacific Islander, 0.8% from some other race, and 5.6% from two or more races. Hispanic or Latino residents of any race comprised 2.1% of the population.

71.1% of residents lived in urban areas, while 28.9% lived in rural areas.

There were 71,971 households in the county, of which 24.6% had children under the age of 18 living in them. Of all households, 46.3% were married-couple households, 19.4% were households with a male householder and no spouse or partner present, and 27.6% were households with a female householder and no spouse or partner present. About 31.1% of all households were made up of individuals and 14.6% had someone living alone who was 65 years of age or older.

There were 78,944 housing units, of which 8.8% were vacant. Among occupied housing units, 72.7% were owner-occupied and 27.3% were renter-occupied. The homeowner vacancy rate was 1.5% and the rental vacancy rate was 9.6%.

=== 2000 census ===
As of the 2000 census, there were 181,412 people, 72,576 households, and 50,512 families residing in the county. The population density was 418 inhabitants per square mile (161/km^{2}). There were 77,765 housing units at an average density of 179 units per square mile (69/km^{2}). The racial makeup of the county was 92.55% White, 5.96% Black or African American, 0.10% Native American, 0.25% Asian, 0.01% Pacific Islander, 0.20% from other races, and 0.92% from two or more races. 0.72% of the population were Hispanic or Latino of any race. 23.0% were of German, 17.4% Italian, 9.9% Irish, 6.5% English, 6.4% Polish and 5.8% American ancestry.

There were 72,576 households, out of which 28.60% had children under the age of 18 living with them, 54.50% were married couples living together, 11.40% had a female householder with no husband present, and 30.40% were non-families. Of all households 26.90% were made up of individuals, and 13.10% had someone living alone who was 65 years of age or older. The average household size was 2.44 and the average family size was 2.96.

In the county, the age distribution of the population shows 22.60% under the age of 18, 7.40% from 18 to 24, 27.30% from 25 to 44, 24.20% from 45 to 64, and 18.40% who were 65 years of age or older. The median age was 41 years. For every 100 females, there were 91.90 males. For every 100 females age 18 and over, there were 88.20 males.

== Government and politics ==
2024 Presidential Election by Township and City Trump: 50–60% 60–70% 70–80% 80–90% Harris: 50–60% 60–70%

United States presidential election results for Beaver County, Pennsylvania
Year	Republican		Democratic		Third party(ies)	
Year	No.	%	No.	%	No.	%
1880	4,700	56.40%	3,498	41.97%	136	1.63%
1884	5,075	56.51%	3,546	39.48%	360	4.01%
1888	5,552	58.23%	3,706	38.87%	276	2.89%
1892	4,890	52.04%	3,822	40.68%	684	7.28%
1896	6,842	59.95%	4,322	37.87%	248	2.17%
1900	6,759	60.11%	4,076	36.25%	409	3.64%
1904	7,122	68.88%	2,342	22.65%	876	8.47%
1908	7,008	55.95%	4,200	33.53%	1,318	10.52%
1912	2,759	21.89%	3,037	24.10%	6,806	54.01%
1916	6,864	48.67%	5,805	41.16%	1,434	10.17%
1920	11,691	62.90%	4,771	25.67%	2,124	11.43%
1924	16,768	64.14%	3,220	12.32%	6,153	23.54%
1928	27,949	69.50%	11,868	29.51%	400	0.99%
1932	19,751	47.87%	19,805	48.00%	1,704	4.13%
1936	20,223	34.68%	37,205	63.80%	884	1.52%
1940	24,324	41.78%	33,609	57.73%	282	0.48%
1944	23,555	41.57%	32,743	57.79%	360	0.64%
1948	22,324	43.83%	26,629	52.28%	1,983	3.89%
1952	31,700	45.18%	38,136	54.35%	334	0.48%
1956	38,263	51.21%	36,373	48.68%	79	0.11%
1960	36,796	43.71%	47,182	56.04%	212	0.25%
1964	23,174	27.59%	60,492	72.02%	327	0.39%
1968	28,264	34.46%	45,396	55.34%	8,368	10.20%
1972	43,637	56.42%	31,570	40.82%	2,130	2.75%
1976	33,593	41.40%	46,117	56.83%	1,440	1.77%
1980	30,496	38.23%	43,955	55.11%	5,314	6.66%
1984	32,052	36.79%	54,765	62.86%	300	0.34%
1988	25,764	33.69%	50,327	65.81%	378	0.49%
1992	21,361	25.94%	44,877	54.50%	16,102	19.56%
1996	26,048	35.07%	39,578	53.28%	8,653	11.65%
2000	32,491	44.12%	38,925	52.85%	2,233	3.03%
2004	39,916	48.36%	42,146	51.06%	481	0.58%
2008	42,895	50.45%	40,499	47.63%	1,638	1.93%
2012	42,344	52.41%	37,055	45.86%	1,394	1.73%
2016	48,167	57.03%	32,531	38.52%	3,764	4.46%
2020	54,759	58.01%	38,122	40.38%	1,516	1.61%
2024	56,837	59.71%	37,196	39.07%	1,161	1.22%

=== Voter registration ===
In November 2008, there were 118,269 registered voters in Beaver County.

- Democratic: 70,819 (59.88%)
- Republican: 36,239 (30.64%)
- Other parties/non-partisan: 11,211 (9.48%)

By April 2016, there were 109,091 registered voters, a decrease of 7.7% since 2008.

The county is divided into 129 precincts.

- Democratic: 58,828 (53.93%)
- Republican: 38,015 (34.85%)
- Other parties/non-partisan: 12,248 (11.23%)

As of January 8, 2024, there were 111,767 registered voters in Beaver county. Republicans hold a plurality of voters by a margin of just 190 voters (less than 1% of the total registered), after overtaking Dems at the end of December 2023. There were 48,229 registered Republicans, 48,039 registered Democrats, 10,390 registered non-affiliated voters and 5,109 voters registered to other parties.

Voter registration and party enrollment
Party	Number of voters	Percentage
Republican	51,030	43.15%
Democratic	48,008	42.98%
Independent	10,390	9.30%
Third Party	5,109	4.57%
Total	111,767	100%

Chart of Voter Registration
1. Republican (43.1%)
2. Democratic (43.0%)
3. Independent (9.30%)
4. Third Party (4.57%)

=== Political history ===
Beaver County used to be a Democratic stronghold, and had a slight Democratic edge in registration until 2023. In 2015, the GOP took majority status in the Commissioners' Office for the first time since 1955. In 2004, Democrat John Kerry won Beaver County over Republican George W. Bush 51% to 48%. In 2008, Republican John McCain defeated Democrat Barack Obama 50% to 47%, becoming the first Republican to win there since 1972 and only the third since 1928. Mitt Romney and Donald Trump (thrice) carried the county in the next four elections. In 2010, Republican Governor Tom Corbett and Republican Senator Pat Toomey both carried Beaver in their successful statewide bids, and Toomey won the county again in 2016. However, Democrats have still seen recent success in Beaver County in non-presidential races, with Democrats often being competitive in the county in Senate and gubernatorial elections. Beaver County voted for Bob Casey Jr. in his reelection bid in 2012 50% to 47%, and again voted to re-elect Casey in 2018, as well as Democrat Tom Wolf.

In 2022, Democratic gubernatorial candidate Josh Shapiro defeated Republican Doug Mastriano in the county, but was the only Democrat that cycle to do so.

=== County commissioners ===
Commissioner	Party	Title
Daniel C. Camp III	Republican	Chairman
Tony Amadio	Democratic	
Jack Manning	Republican	

=== County officials ===
Office	Official	Party
Clerk of Courts	Judy R. Enslen	Democratic
Controller	Maria Longo	Republican
Coroner	David Gabauer	Republican
District Attorney	Nathan Bible	Democratic
Prothonotary	Jodi Janicki-Jones	Republican
Recorder of Deeds	Ronald Alberti	Republican
Register of Wills	Tracey Antoline Patton	Democratic
Sheriff	Tony Guy	Republican
Treasurer	Sandie Egley	Republican

=== Governor ===
- Josh Shapiro, Democratic, 48thPennsylvania Governor

Pennsylvania Gubernatorial election results for Beaver County
Year	Republican		Democratic		Third party(ies)	
Year	No.	%	No.	%	No.	%
1914	5,502	58.03%	3,115	32.86%	864	9.11%
1918	4,819	59.25%	2,350	28.89%	964	11.85%
1922	7,040	55.21%	5,012	39.30%	700	5.49%
1926	15,149	54.76%	11,641	42.08%	875	3.16%
1930	13,560	55.27%	7,937	32.35%	3,038	12.38%
1934	14,815	36.31%	25,203	61.76%	787	1.93%
1938	19,850	51.42%	18,210	47.18%	540	1.40%
1942	15,323	50.41%	14,600	48.03%	473	1.56%
1946	22,369	54.07%	18,501	44.72%	500	1.21%
1950	23,321	47.89%	24,751	50.83%	623	1.28%
1954	21,882	38.28%	35,131	61.46%	145	0.25%
1958	23,450	43.80%	29,880	55.81%	210	0.39%
1962	37,820	50.78%	36,229	48.64%	433	0.58%
1966	29,737	42.63%	39,298	56.34%	720	1.03%
1970	20,591	31.13%	43,442	65.67%	2,116	3.20%
1974	25,095	40.29%	36,152	58.04%	1,038	1.67%
1978	21,887	33.01%	44,094	66.51%	318	0.48%
1982	28,473	38.23%	45,408	60.97%	596	0.80%
1986	19,232	32.61%	39,216	66.50%	526	0.89%
1990	13,577	23.72%	43,348	75.73%	315	0.55%
1994	20,201	33.74%	26,965	45.04%	12,703	21.22%
1998	24,993	47.14%	19,879	37.49%	8,146	15.36%
2002	23,744	45.23%	27,322	52.05%	1,427	2.72%
2006	29,069	45.01%	35,510	54.99%	0	0.00%
2010	32,670	56.49%	25,163	43.51%	0	0.00%
2014	23,302	48.79%	24,456	51.21%	0	0.00%
2018	30,593	45.07%	36,166	53.28%	1,117	1.65%
2022	34,777	47.47%	36,917	50.39%	1,568	2.14%

=== State representatives ===
District	Representative	Party
14	Roman Kozak	Republican
15	Josh Kail	Republican
16	Robert Matzie	Democratic

=== State senators ===
District	Senator	Party
46	Camera Bartolotta	Republican
47	Elder Vogel	Republican

=== United States House of Representatives ===
District	Representative	Party
17	Chris Deluzio	Democratic

=== United States Senate ===
Senator	Party
Dave McCormick	Republican
John Fetterman	Democratic

United States Senate election results for Beaver County, Pennsylvania1
Year	Republican		Democratic		Third party(ies)	
Year	No.	%	No.	%	No.	%
1916	11,542	58.94%	6,531	33.35%	1,510	7.71%
1922	11,542	58.94%	6,531	33.35%	1,510	7.71%
1922	11,402	58.48%	6,612	33.91%	1,482	7.60%
1928	27,851	69.53%	11,795	29.45%	408	1.02%
1934	14,923	37.35%	24,118	60.36%	915	2.29%
1940	24,115	42.01%	32,968	57.43%	320	0.56%
1946	21,980	54.52%	17,925	44.46%	410	1.02%
1952	30,551	44.89%	37,219	54.69%	290	0.43%
1958	22,109	43.58%	28,443	56.06%	185	0.36%
1964	22,870	27.78%	59,211	71.93%	240	0.29%
1970	19,410	30.75%	41,895	66.37%	1,820	2.88%
1976	32,884	41.57%	45,102	57.01%	1,120	1.42%
1982	27,210	37.65%	44,551	61.64%	510	0.71%
1988	24,912	33.47%	49,210	66.11%	315	0.42%
1991	24,917	36.89%	42,109	62.35%	512	0.76%
1994	26,736	42.65%	32,357	51.62%	3,595	5.73%
2000	33,609	44.17%	41,419	54.43%	1,061	1.39%
2006	24,450	37.94%	39,998	62.06%	0	0.00%
2012	38,092	47.76%	39,970	50.11%	1,701	2.13%
2018	31,916	47.18%	34,442	50.92%	1,284	1.90%
2024	53,593	56.56%	38,529	40.66%	2,635	2.78%

United States Senate election results for Beaver County, Pennsylvania3
Year	Republican		Democratic		Third party(ies)	
Year	No.	%	No.	%	No.	%
1914	5,112	49.89%	3,240	31.62%	1,894	18.49%
1920	16,842	73.41%	4,210	18.35%	1,890	8.24%
1926	12,410	48.22%	10,215	39.69%	3,110	12.08%
1930	14,310	63.94%	6,950	31.05%	1,120	5.00%
1932	19,751	47.87%	19,805	48.00%	1,704	4.13%
1938	19,850	51.42%	18,210	47.18%	540	1.40%
1944	22,114	41.08%	31,402	58.34%	310	0.58%
1950	22,894	48.29%	24,102	50.84%	412	0.87%
1956	28,150	47.48%	30,912	52.14%	220	0.37%
1962	24,110	39.12%	37,210	60.38%	310	0.50%
1968	24,110	38.79%	35,912	57.77%	2,140	3.44%
1974	25,102	38.46%	39,250	60.13%	920	1.41%
1980	31,912	45.97%	36,102	52.00%	1,410	2.03%
1986	21,115	32.81%	42,912	66.69%	320	0.50%
1992	32,418	39.74%	43,716	53.59%	5,434	6.66%
1998	29,111	56.46%	20,729	40.20%	1,720	3.34%
2004	37,454	45.55%	38,188	46.44%	6,589	8.01%
2010	30,136	52.43%	27,339	47.57%	0	0.00%
2016	44,000	52.81%	34,263	41.12%	5,058	6.07%
2022	38,772	52.79%	32,692	44.51%	1,979	2.69%

== Recreation ==
There are two Buttermilk Falls in Beaver County. The one in Buttermilk Falls county park in Homewood is the highest. the other is in Koppel; the one in Wampum is, as of 1849, in Lawrence County. In Brighton Township there is Brady's Run Park. Racoon Creek State Park is listed as one of Pennsylvania's top fifteen state parks. The park encompasses 7,572 acres (3,064 ha) and features the 101 acres (41 ha) Raccoon Lake, a wildflower preserve, and the Frankfort Mineral Springs. Additionally, there are several riverfront parks throughout the county. The North Country National Scenic Trail (NCT) passes through the county's northern end. The NCT has an 11-mile point-to-point off-road section near Darlington to the Ohio state line and a 2.5 mile off-road section near New Galilee and Enon Valley, Pennsylvania.

== Transportation ==
=== Major roads and highways ===
- I-76 / Penna Turnpike
- I-376
- US 30 / Lincoln Highway
- PA 18
- PA 51
- PA 65
- PA 68
- PA 151
- PA 168
- PA 251
- PA 288
- PA 351
- PA 551
- PA 588
- PA 989

=== Public transit ===
Beaver County Transit Authority

=== Airports ===
- Beaver County Airport
- Zelienople Municipal Airport

== Education ==
=== Colleges and universities ===
- Geneva College
- Penn State Beaver Campus
- Trinity Episcopal School for Ministry

=== Community, junior, and technical colleges ===
- Community College of Beaver County

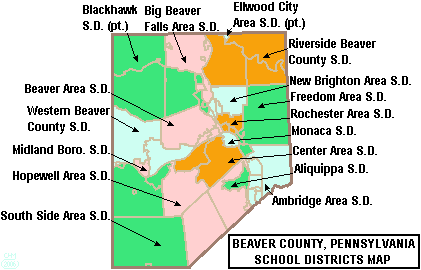
Map of Beaver County, Pennsylvania public school districts. Note that two districts on this map, Monaca School District and Center Area School District, merged in 2009 to form the Central Valley School District.

=== Public school districts ===
- Aliquippa School District
- Ambridge Area School District
- Beaver Area School District
- Big Beaver Falls Area School District
- Blackhawk School District (part)
- Central Valley School District
- Freedom Area School District
- Hopewell Area School District
- Midland Borough School District
- New Brighton Area School District
- Riverside Beaver County School District
- Rochester Area School District
- South Side Area School District
- Western Beaver County School District

==== High schools ====
- Aliquippa High School
- Ambridge Area High School
- Beaver Area High School
- Beaver County Christian High School
- Beaver Falls High School
- Blackhawk High School
- Central Valley High School
- Freedom Area High School
- Hopewell High School
- Lincoln Park Performing Arts Charter School
- New Brighton High School
- Quigley Catholic High School
- Riverside High School
- Rochester Area High School
- South Side Beaver High School
- Western Beaver High School

=== Charter schools ===
As reported by the Pennsylvania Department of Education – EdNA, as of April 2010.

- Baden Academy Charter School (grades K–6)
- Lincoln Park Performing Arts Charter School (grades 7–12)
- Midland Innovation + Technology Charter School (grades 9-12) (announced closure in August 2025)

=== Private schools ===
As reported by the Pennsylvania Department of Education – EdNA, as of April 2010.

- Agapeland Children Garden – Beaver
- Beaver County Christian School -Upper – Beaver Falls
- Beaver Co Christian -West Park Elementary – Beaver Falls
- Bethel Christian School – Aliquippa
- Deliverance Temple Ministries ROOTS Inc Christian Academy – Aliquippa
- Hope Christian Academy – Aliquippa
- North Hills Christian School – Baden
- Our Lady of Fatima School – Aliquippa
- Pleasant Hill Wesleyan Academy – Hookstown
- Quigley Catholic High School – Baden
- St John the Baptist School – Monaca
- St Monica Catholic Academy – Beaver Falls
- Sts Peter & Paul School – Beaver
- Sylvania Hills Christian – Rochester

=== Former school districts ===
In 2009, Center Area School District and Monaca School District merged to form Central Valley School District.

== Communities ==
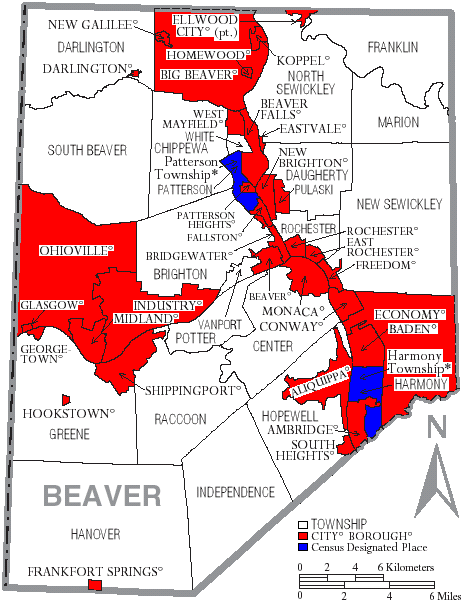
Map of Beaver County, Pennsylvania with municipal labels showing cities and boroughs (red), townships (white), and census-designated places (blue)

Under Pennsylvania law, there are four types of incorporated municipalities: cities, boroughs, townships, and, in at most two cases, towns. The following cities, boroughs and townships are in Beaver County:

=== Cities ===
- Aliquippa
- Beaver Falls

=== Boroughs ===
- Ambridge
- Baden
- Beaver (county seat)
- Big Beaver
- Bridgewater
- Conway
- Darlington
- East Rochester
- Eastvale
- Economy
- Ellwood City (mostly in Lawrence County)
- Fallston
- Frankfort Springs
- Freedom
- Georgetown
- Glasgow
- Homewood
- Hookstown
- Industry
- Koppel
- Midland
- Monaca
- New Brighton
- New Galilee
- Ohioville
- Patterson Heights
- Rochester
- Shippingport
- South Heights
- West Mayfield

=== Townships ===
- Brighton
- Center
- Chippewa
- Darlington
- Daugherty
- Franklin
- Greene
- Hanover
- Harmony
- Hopewell
- Independence
- Marion
- New Sewickley
- North Sewickley
- Patterson
- Potter
- Pulaski
- Raccoon
- Rochester
- South Beaver
- Vanport
- White

=== Census-designated places ===
- Frisco
- Hazen

=== Unincorporated communities ===
- Byersdale
- Cannelton
- Fombell
- Gringo
- Harshaville
- Kobuta
- Unionville
- West Aliquippa

=== Former communities ===
- Borough Township, established in 1804 from the small southeast corner of South Beaver Township. In 1970, it was renamed Vanport Township.
- First Moon Township, split from Moon Township in Allegheny County in 1800, and was abolished in 1812 after the county was restructured.
- Little Beaver Township, which was part of Beaver County from 1801 until 1849, when Lawrence County was created.
- Moon Township, established in 1812 in most of the territories of First and Second Moon Townships. It originally held the portion of the county South of the Ohio River. Over the next century, parts of the Township were split into Center, Potter, and Racoon Townships. It became extinct in 1932 after the remaining portion was annexed by Monaca, as the ward of Monaca Heights.
- North Beaver Township, which was one of the original townships of Beaver County, from its creation in 1799, until 1849, when Lawrence County was created.
- Perry Township, which was part of Beaver County from 1845 until 1849, when Lawrence County was created.
- Second Moon Township, split from Moon Township in Allegheny County in 1800, and was abolished in 1812 after the county was restructured.
- Sewickley Township, split from Pine Township in Allegheny County in 1797, and originally held the portion of the county East of the Beaver River. It was split into North Sewickley and New Sewickley Townships in 1801.
- Shenango Township, which was part of Beaver County from 1804 until 1849, when Lawrence County was created.
- Slippery Rock Township, which was part of Beaver County from 1837 until 1849, when Lawrence County was created.
- Wayne Township, which was part of Beaver County from 1845 until 1849, when Lawrence County was created.

=== Population ranking ===
The population ranking of the following table is based on the 2010 census of Beaver County.

† county seat

Rank	City/town/etc.	Population (2010 Census)	Municipal type	Incorporated
1	Aliquippa	9,438	City	1928 (borough) 1987 (city)
2	Beaver Falls	8,987	City	1868 (borough) 1928 (city)
3	Economy	8,970	Borough	1957
4	Ellwood City (mostly in Lawrence County)	7,921	Borough	
5	Ambridge	7,050	Borough	1905
6	New Brighton	6,025	Borough	1838
7	Monaca	5,737	Borough	1840
8	† Beaver	4,531	Borough	1802
9	Baden	4,135	Borough	1868
10	Rochester	3,657	Borough	1849
11	Ohioville	3,533	Borough	1860
12	Harmony Township	3,197	CDP and township	1851
13	Patterson Township	3,029	CDP and township	1845
14	Midland	2,635	Borough	1906
15	Conway	2,176	Borough	1902
16	Big Beaver	1,970	Borough	1858
17	Industry	1,835	Borough	1960
18	Freedom	1,569	Borough	1838
19	West Mayfield	1,239	Borough	1923
20	Koppel	762	Borough	1910
21	Bridgewater	704	Borough	1835
22	Patterson Heights	636	Borough	1899
23	East Rochester	567	Borough	1908
24	South Heights	475	Borough	1910
25	New Galilee	379	Borough	1854
26	Fallston	266	Borough	1829
27	Darlington	254	Borough	1820
28	Eastvale	225	Borough	1892
29	Shippingport	214	Borough	1910
30	Georgetown	174	Borough	1850
31	Hookstown	147	Borough	1843
32	Frankfort Springs	130	Borough	1844
33	Homewood	109	Borough	1910
34	Glasgow	60	Borough	1854

== Notable people ==
- Sam Adams – early explorer of the American west
- Gust Avrakotos – CIA operative active in Operation Cyclone
- Julian Michael Carver – science fiction novelist known for his usage of dinosaurs in fiction
- Jim Covert – former NFL offensive tackle for the Chicago Bears, inducted into the College Football Hall of Fame in 2003
- Ed DeChellis – head men's basketball coach for The Naval Academy
- Mike Ditka – former NFL tight end for the Chicago Bears, Philadelphia Eagles and Dallas Cowboys, and head coach for the Chicago Bears and New Orleans Saints, inducted into the Pro Football Hall of Fame in 1988 (as a tight end)
- Tony Dorsett – former NFL running back for the Dallas Cowboys and Denver Broncos, inducted into both the Pro and College Football Hall of Fame in 1994
- Shane Douglas – born Troy Martin, professional wrestler, best known with Extreme Championship Wrestling, having also wrestled for World Championship Wrestling, Total Nonstop Action Wrestling, and (briefly) with the World Wrestling Federation. He is also a former teacher for Beaver Area High School
- Terry Francona – former Major League Baseball first baseman and outfielder for the Montreal Expos, Chicago Cubs, Cincinnati Reds, Cleveland Indians and Milwaukee Brewers, and former manager for the Philadelphia Phillies and Boston Red Sox
- Sean Gilbert – former NFL defensive lineman for the Los Angeles/St. Louis Rams, Washington Redskins, Carolina Panthers and Oakland Raiders
- Donnie Iris – musician, former member of The Jaggerz and Wild Cherry, also notable for his solo performances
- Ty Law – former NFL cornerback for the New England Patriots, New York Jets, Kansas City Chiefs and Denver Broncos
- Joe Letteri – three-time Academy Award-winning visual imaging artist, and visual effects supervisor of the movie Avatar
- Henry Mancini – music composer, including "Moon River" and "The Pink Panther Theme", among many others
- "Pistol" Pete Maravich – former NBA guard for the Atlanta Hawks, New Orleans/Utah Jazz and Boston Celtics, inducted into the Basketball Hall of Fame in 1987
- Press Maravich – former NCAA Basketball coach
- Nate Martin – Entrepreneur and "Founding Father of Escape Rooms"
- Doc Medich – former Major League Baseball pitcher for the New York Yankees, Pittsburgh Pirates, Oakland Athletics, Seattle Mariners, New York Mets, Texas Rangers and Milwaukee Brewers
- Ryan "Archie" Miller – current NCAA Basketball coach for the Rhode Island Rams, and former NCAA Basketball coach for the Dayton Flyers and Indiana Hoosiers.
- Sean Miller – current NCAA Basketball coach for the Xavier Musketeers, and former NCAA Basketball coach for the Arizona Wildcats
- Joe Namath – former NFL and AFL quarterback for the New York Jets and Los Angeles Rams, inducted into the Pro Football Hall of Fame in 1985
- Babe Parilli – former NFL and AFL quarterback for the Green Bay Packers, Cleveland Browns, Oakland Raiders, Boston Patriots and New York Jets, former CFL quarterback for the Ottawa Rough Riders, and All-American quarterback for the University of Kentucky
- Paul Posluszny – NFL linebacker for the Jacksonville Jaguars
- Dan Radakovich – Athletics Director for the Georgia Tech Yellow Jackets
- Darrelle Revis – NFL cornerback for the New York Jets
- Jesse Steinfeld – former Surgeon General of the United States
- Pete Suder – former Major League Baseball infielder for the Philadelphia Athletics/Kansas City Athletics
- Mark Vlasic – former NFL quarterback for the San Diego Chargers, Kansas City Chiefs and Tampa Bay Buccaneers
- William Ziegler – industrialist and co-founder of the Royal Baking Powder Company

== See also ==
- List of Pennsylvania state historical markers in Beaver County
- National Register of Historic Places listings in Beaver County, Pennsylvania
- Ohio River Trail
