= Byersdale, Pennsylvania =

Unincorporated community in Pennsylvania, US

Coordinates: 40°37′25″N 80°13′28″W

Byersdale is an unincorporated community in Harmony Township, Pennsylvania, United States. The community is located in Beaver County along Pennsylvania Route 65, directly north of the confluence of the Ohio River and Legionville Run and directly south of Baden.

Byersdale is part of the Ambridge Area School District, although the mailing address for Byersdale residents is Baden.

Byersdale once boasted an Isaly's dairy store at the corner of Duss Avenue and Dearborn Street. It now has a business district confined to one block along Duss Avenue.
