= Midland Borough School District =

School district in Pennsylvania

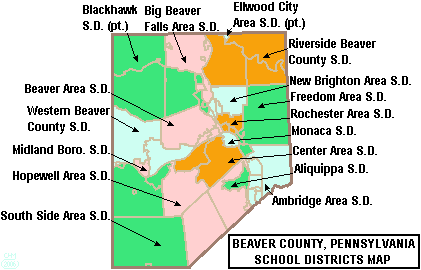

Address
- 173 7th Street Midland, Beaver County, Pennsylvania, 15059-1469; United States

District information
- Type: Public

Other information
- Website: midlandpa.org

The Midland Borough School District is a very small public school district serving Midland, Pennsylvania in Beaver County, Pennsylvania. It features one school offering PreK-8th grade Midland Elementary-Middle School. The district encompasses approximately 5.2 square miles (13 km^{2}). The 2000 Census Data reported the median household income was $23,117 in a population of 3,137 people. By 2010, the district's population declined to 2,635 people. The educational attainment levels for the School District population (25 years old and over) were 79.2% high school graduates and 13.2% college graduates.

According to the Pennsylvania Budget and Policy Center, 64.9% of the district's pupils lived at 185% or below the Federal Poverty level as shown by their eligibility for the federal free or reduced price school meal programs in 2012. In 2009, the district residents’ per capita income was $17,066. In the Commonwealth, the median family income was $49,501 and the United States median family income was $49,445, in 2010. In Beaver County, the median household income was $46,190. By 2013, the median household income in the United States rose to $52,100.

The district operates a single school, Midland Elementary Middle School. The Beaver Valley Intermediate Unit IU27 provides the district with a wide variety of services like specialized education for disabled students and hearing, speech and visual disability services and professional development for staff and faculty.

== History ==
Until 1985, the Lincoln High School operated within the borough. In 1985, the school board voted to close Lincoln Junior-Senior High School. With only 150 students in grades 7 through 12, they could no longer afford to operate the school. The district made two failed attempts to merge with neighboring Western Beaver County School District (once in 1965, and again in 1985). Midland School Board entered into a 5-year tuition agreement ($200,000 a year) with Beaver Area School District (1985 to 1990). In 1990, an agreement was reached to bus students 8 miles to East Liverpool High School in East Liverpool, Ohio where they attend 9th through 12th grades and graduate. These were the only Pennsylvania public school students attending a facility in another state. In February 2015, East Liverpool notified the Midland Borough School Board of its intention to end the agreement. Students currently attending East Liverpool will be permitted to graduate, but no new students will be admitted to the district. According to the Midland SD website (midlandpa.org) the High School students now attend the Beaver Area High School.
