= New Brighton Area School District =

School district in Pennsylvania

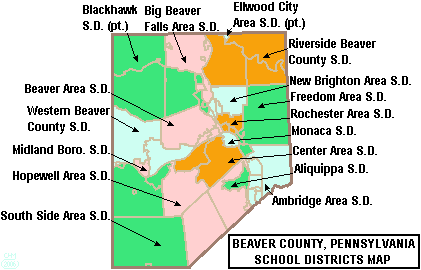

Address
- 3225 43rd Street New Brighton, Pennsylvania, 15066; United States

District information
- Type: Public
- Motto: Lions Take Pride in Learning
- Established: 2023

Students and staff
- District mascot: Lions
- Colors: Crimson and Gold

Other information
- Website: http://www.nbasd.org/

The New Brighton Area School District is a suburban public school district located in Beaver County, Pennsylvania. It serves the boroughs of New Brighton, Pulaski, and Fallston, and the township of Daugherty. New Brighton Area School District encompasses approximately 12 square miles (31 km^{2}). According to 2000 federal census data, the district serves a resident population of 12,065 people.

The district features three schools: New Brighton High School (9-12), New Brighton Middle School (6-8), and New Brighton Elementary School (K-5).
