= Bridgewater, Pennsylvania =

Borough in Pennsylvania, US

- Borough
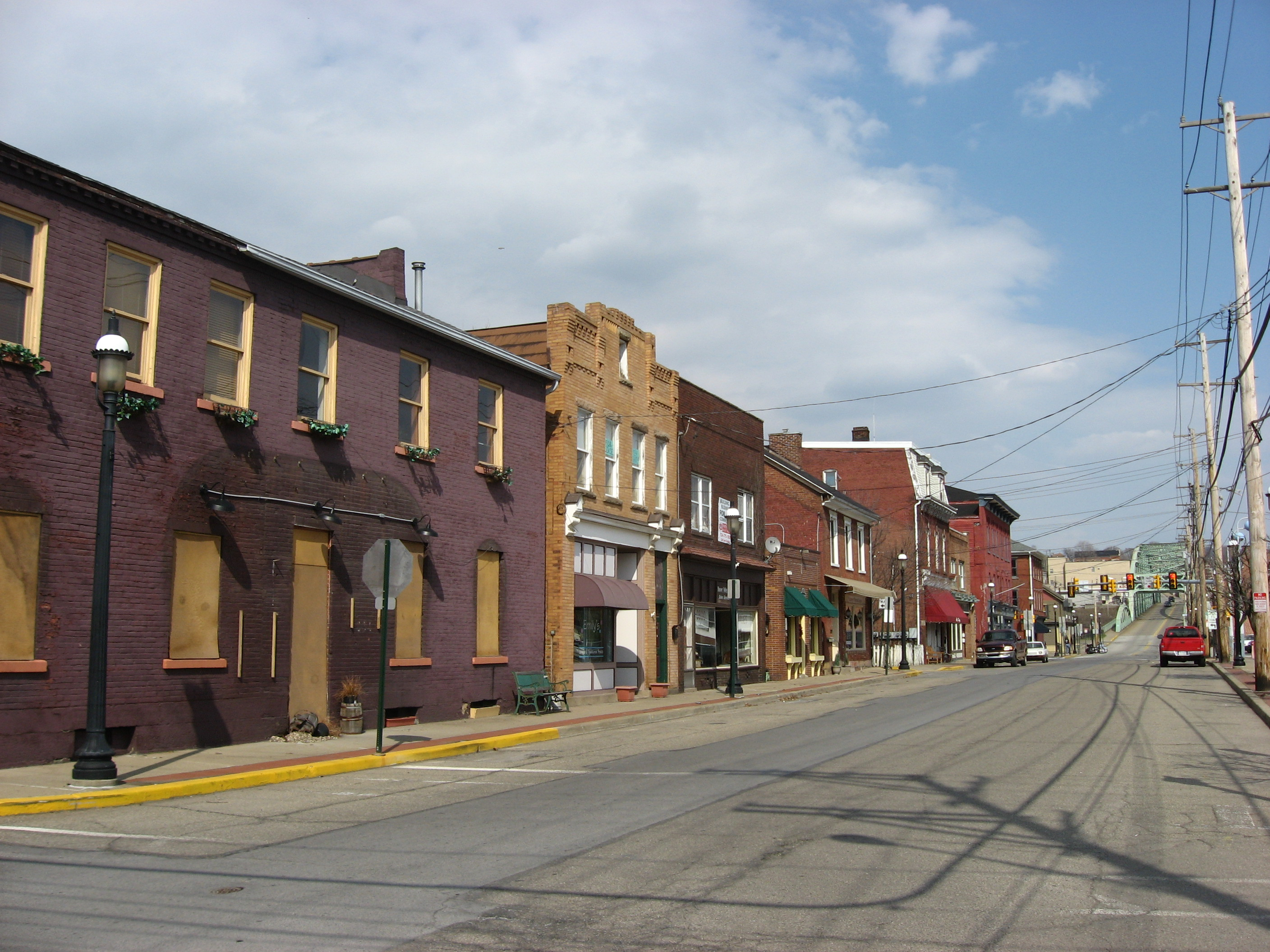
- Bridge Street in downtown Bridgewater
- Interactive map of Bridgewater, Pennsylvania
- Location within Pennsylvania Location within the United States
- Coordinates: 40°42′14″N 80°17′48″W
- Country: United States
- State: Pennsylvania
- County: Beaver
- Settled: 1798
- Incorporated: 1835

Government
  - Mayor: Tim Reddinger

Area
  - Total: 0.73 sq mi (1.89 km^{2})
  - Land: 0.62 sq mi (1.61 km^{2})
  - Water: 0.10 sq mi (0.27 km^{2})
- Elevation: 1,024 ft (312 m)

Population (2020)
  - Total: 745
  - Density: 1,196.4/sq mi (461.93/km^{2})
- Time zone: UTC-5 (Eastern (EST))
  - Summer (DST): UTC-4 (EDT)
- Area code: 724
- FIPS code: 42-08632
- Website: www.bridgewaterpa.com

Bridgewater is a borough in central Beaver County, Pennsylvania, United States, at the confluence of the Beaver and Ohio rivers. The population was 745 at the 2020 census. It is part of the Pittsburgh metropolitan area. The borough is best known as the home of the Bruster's Ice Cream chain.

== History ==
The earliest permanent American settlers arrived in about 1798 or 1799 and founded the town of Sharon. In 1805 and 1806, U.S. vice president Aaron Burr constructed boat yards in Sharon and had several cargo boats built for his travel to the Louisiana Territory. Bridgewater was incorporated as a borough on April 2, 1835, and consolidated with Sharon in 1868.

Much of Bridgewater, including its two major streets, is included in the Bridgewater Historic District. A few scenes in the 1986 movie Gung Ho were shot in Bridgewater.

== Geography ==
Bridgewater is located at 40°42′14″N 80°17′48″W (40.703827, −80.296715). The borough lies at the confluence of the Ohio and Beaver rivers. According to the United States Census Bureau, the borough has a total area of 0.8 square miles (2.1 km^{2}), of which 0.7 square miles (1.8 km^{2}) is land and 0.1 square miles (0.26 km^{2}) (10.39%) is water.

Bridgewater has three land borders, with Beaver to the southwest, Brighton Township to the west and Fallston to the northwest. Across the Beaver River from the east to its confluence with the Ohio River southeast, Bridgewater runs adjacent with Rochester Township, the borough of Rochester, and Monaca.

== Demographics ==
Historical population
Census	Pop.	Note	%±
1860	822		—
1870	1,119		36.1%
1880	1,112		−0.6%
1890	1,177		5.8%
1900	1,347		14.4%
1910	1,562		16.0%
1920	1,340		−14.2%
1930	1,792		33.7%
1940	1,621		−9.5%
1950	1,316		−18.8%
1960	1,292		−1.8%
1970	966		−25.2%
1980	879		−9.0%
1990	751		−14.6%
2000	739		−1.6%
2010	704		−4.7%
2020	745		5.8%
2021 (est.)	735	▼	−1.3%

As of the 2000 census, there were 739 people, 335 households, and 210 families residing in the borough. The population density was 1,068.5 inhabitants per square mile (412.6/km^{2}). There were 361 housing units at an average density of 522.0 per square mile (201.5/km^{2}). The racial makeup of the borough was 89.04% White, 8.80% African American, 0.14% Native American, 0.41% Asian, 0.27% from other races, and 1.35% from two or more races. Hispanic or Latino of any race were 0.54% of the population.

There were 335 households, out of which 22.7% had children under the age of 18 living with them, 44.5% were married couples living together, 13.4% had a female householder with no husband present, and 37.3% were non-families. 31.6% of all households were made up of individuals, and 14.9% had someone living alone who was 65 years of age or older. The average household size was 2.21 and the average family size was 2.71.

In the borough the population was spread out, with 19.6% under the age of 18, 8.0% from 18 to 24, 28.0% from 25 to 44, 26.8% from 45 to 64, and 17.6% who were 65 years of age or older. The median age was 42 years. For every 100 females, there were 90.0 males. For every 100 females age 18 and over, there were 85.6 males.

The median income for a household in the borough was $38,750, and the median income for a family was $42,500. Males had a median income of $31,023 versus $24,286 for females. The per capita income for the borough was $19,695. About 8.8% of families and 12.0% of the population were below the poverty line, including 15.4% of those under age 18 and 9.8% of those age 65 or over.

== Arts and culture ==
The annual Boom on the Bridge festival was moved to the borough in 2025. Replacing the borough's Summerfest, it celebrates the river towns in the vicinity, culminating in a fireworks display.

== Education ==
Children in Bridgewater are served by the Beaver Area School District, which includes two elementary schools, College Square and Dutch Ridge, one middle school conjoined to the high school campus, and Beaver Area High School.

== Media ==
The Beaver County Times, the sole newspaper covering Beaver County, has its headquarters in Bridgewater. A daily publication, it is the descendant of the acquisition and merger of many of the county's newspapers.

== Public services ==
Bridgewater houses its own police department, fire department, and emergency medical services. The Bridgewater Volunteer Fire Department was chartered in 1905..
