= North Sewickley Township, Pennsylvania =

Township in Pennsylvania, US

Coordinates: 40°48′N 80°18′W

- Township
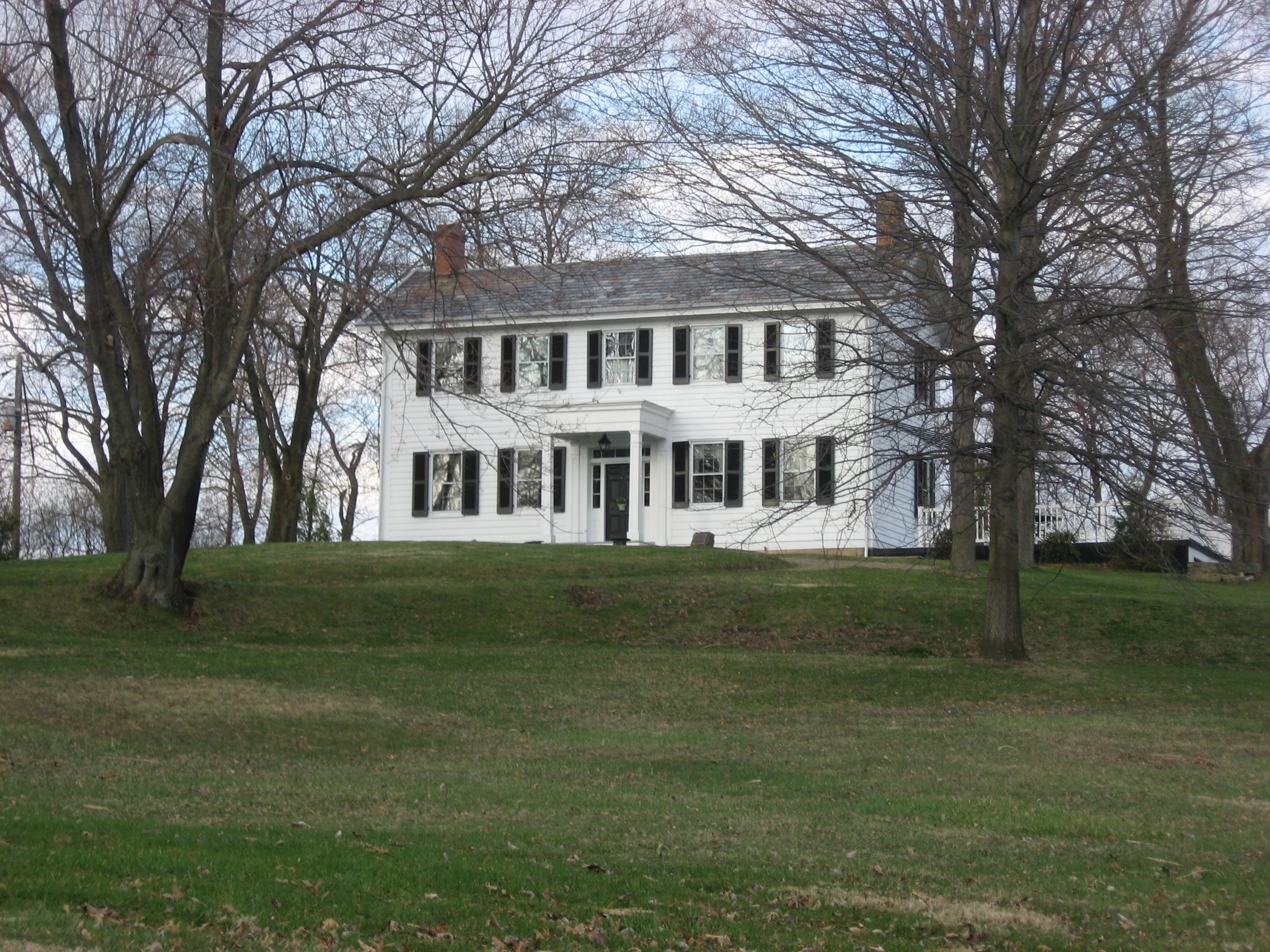
- James Beach Clow House (1830); National Register of Historic Places
- Motto: Families Growing Together for the Future
- Location in Beaver County and state of Pennsylvania
- Country: United States
- State: Pennsylvania
- County: Beaver
- Incorporated: 1801

Area
  - Total: 21.03 sq mi (54.47 km^{2})
  - Land: 20.77 sq mi (53.79 km^{2})
  - Water: 0.26 sq mi (0.68 km^{2})

Population (2020)
  - Total: 5,496 ▲
  - Estimate (2021): 5,454
  - Density: 263.7/sq mi (101.81/km^{2})
- Time zone: UTC-5 (Eastern (EST))
  - Summer (DST): UTC-4 (EDT)
- FIPS code: 42-007-55400
- Website: www.northsewickleytownship.com

North Sewickley Township is a township in Beaver County, Pennsylvania, United States. The population was 5,496 at the 2020 census. It is part of the Pittsburgh metropolitan area.

== History ==
While no clear record has been found, it appears that in 1801, North Sewickley Township was created when Sewickley Township was divided into New Sewickley and North Sewickley Townships. Sewickley Township ceased to exist at that time.

On May 31, 1985, the township was hit by an F3 tornado as part of the 1985 United States–Canada tornado outbreak, destroying four businesses (Hummel's Texaco Service Station, Spotlight 88 Drive-In Theater, Kemp's Butcher Shop and J & J Supply hardware store) and several homes.

== Geography ==
North Sewickley Township is located in northern Beaver County, on the east side of the Beaver River. Its northeastern boundary is formed by Connoquenessing Creek. The northern boundary of the township is the Beaver County-Lawrence County line.

According to the United States Census Bureau, the township has a total area of 21.1 square miles (54.6 km^{2}), of which 20.8 square miles (53.8 km^{2}) is land and 0.31 square miles (0.8 km^{2}), or 1.44%, is water. It contains the census-designated place of Hazen.

North Sewickley Township is drained by tributaries of the Beaver River including Thompson Run and Bennett Run in the west. On the north and east, it is drained by Brush Run, a tributary of Connoquenessing Creek and directly by Connoquenessing Creek.

=== Surrounding and adjacent neighborhoods ===
North Sewickley Township has five land borders with Wayne Township in Lawrence County and Ellwood City to the north, Marion Township to the east, Daugherty Township to the south, and Eastvale to the southwest. To the northeast across Connoquenessing Creek, North Sewickley Township runs adjacent with Franklin Township with a direct link via Mercer Road Bridge on PA Route 65. Across the Beaver River to the west, North Sewickley Township runs adjacent with, from north to south, Koppel, Big Beaver, and Beaver Falls.

== Demographics ==
Historical population
Census	Pop.	Note	%±
1970	6,048		—
1980	6,758		11.7%
1990	6,178		−8.6%
2000	6,120		−0.9%
2010	5,488		−10.3%
2020	5,496		0.1%
2021 (est.)	5,454		−0.8%
U.S. Decennial Census

As of the 2000 census, there were 6,120 people, 2,238 households, and 1,759 families residing in the township. The population density was 294.7 inhabitants per square mile (113.8/km^{2}). There were 2,326 housing units at an average density of 112.0 per square mile (43.2/km^{2}). The racial makeup of the township was 98.20% White, 0.90% African American, 0.02% Native American, 0.20% Asian, 0.02% Pacific Islander, 0.05% from other races, and 0.62% from two or more races. Hispanic or Latino of any race were 0.33% of the population.

There were 2,238 households, out of which 32.2% had children under the age of 18 living with them, 67.4% were married living together, 7.8% had a female householder with no husband present, and 21.4% were non-families. 18.4% of all households were made up of individuals, and 9.6% had someone living alone who was 65 years of age or older. The average household size was 2.69 and the average family size was 3.06.

In the township the population was spread out, with 24.2% under the age of 18, 6.7% from 18 to 24, 26.3% from 25 to 44, 25.8% from 45 to 64, and 17.0% who were 65 years of age or older. The median age was 41 years. For every 100 females, there were 94.2 males. For every 100 females age 18 and over, there were 92.6 males.

The median income for a household in the township was $41,375, and the median income for a family was $44,736. Males had a median income of $33,431 versus $26,179 for females. The per capita income for the township was $18,731. About 3.1% of families and 5.0% of the population were below the poverty line, including 6.1% of those under age 18 and 5.9% of those age 65 or over.

== See also ==
- New Sewickley Township, Pennsylvania
- Sewickley Township, Beaver County, Pennsylvania

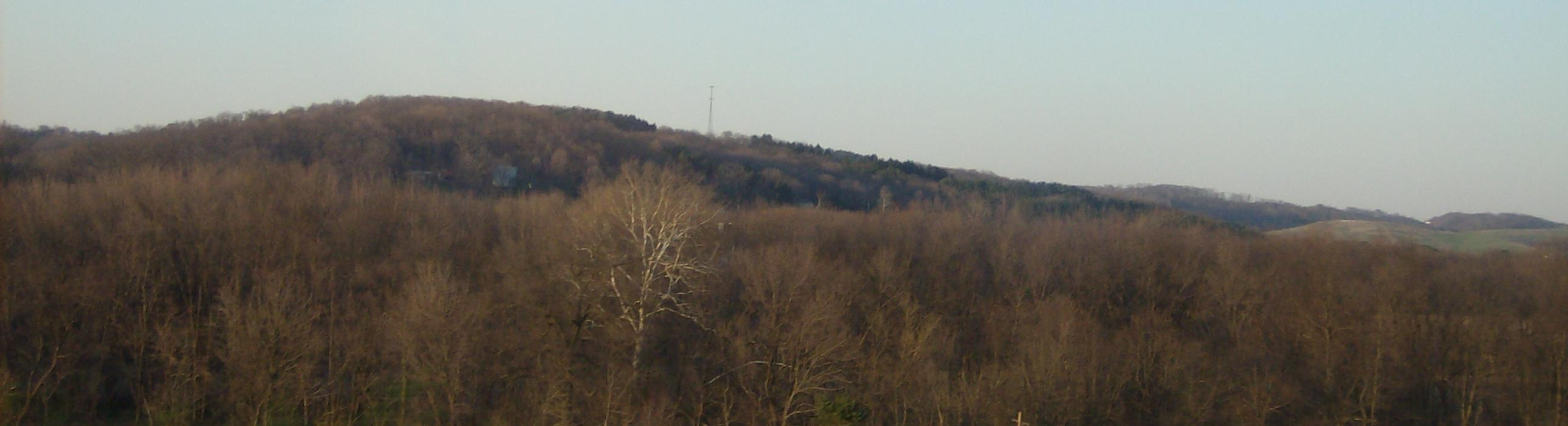
Countryside in North Sewickley Township
