= Freedom Area School District =

School district in Pennsylvania

Coordinates: 40.67769°N 80.24293°W

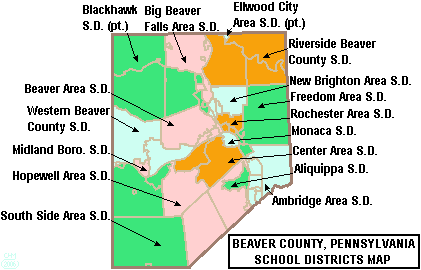

Address
- 1701 Eighth Avenue Freedom, Pennsylvania, 15042; United States

District information
- Type: Public

Students and staff
- District mascot: Bulldog
- Colors: Red and white

Other information
- Website: freedomareaschools.org

The Freedom Area School District is a small, rural, public school district in Beaver County, Pennsylvania, USA. It serves the boroughs of Freedom, Conway, and the township of New Sewickley. Freedom Area School District encompasses approximately 35 square miles (91 km^{2}). According to 2000 federal census data, it has a resident population of 11,129 people. In 2009, the district residents’ per capita income was $17,961, while the median family income was $46,125. In the Commonwealth, the median family income was $49,501 and the United States median family income was $49,445, in 2010.

The district operates three schools: Freedom Area High School (9th–12th), Freedom Area Middle School (5th–8th), and Freedom Area Elementary School (K-4th).
