= Riverside Beaver County School District =

School district in Pennsylvania

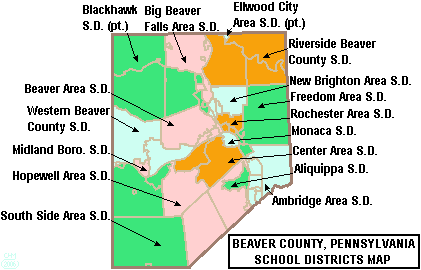

Address
- 300 Country Club Drive Ellwood City, Beaver County, Pennsylvania, 16117-4910; United States

District information
- Type: Public

Other information
- Website: http://www.riverside.k12.pa.us

Riverside Beaver County School District is a small public school district located in Beaver County, Pennsylvania. It serves the residents of the townships of North Sewickley, Marion, and Franklin Townships. The Riverside Beaver County School District encompasses approximately 49 square miles (130 km^{2}). According to 2000 federal census data, it serves a resident population of 11,367. In 2009, the district residents’ per capita income was $19,408, while the median family income was $45.382. In the Commonwealth, the median family income was $49,501 and the United States median family income was $49,445, in 2010.

The district features a progression of four schools: Riverside Beaver Primary School (K-3), Riverside Beaver Intermediary School (4–5), Riverside Beaver Middle School (6–8), and Riverside Beaver High School (9–12).
