= Pulaski Township, Pennsylvania =

Pulaski Township is the name of some places in the U.S. state of Pennsylvania:

- Pulaski Township, Beaver County, Pennsylvania
- Pulaski Township, Lawrence County, Pennsylvania
