= Ambridge Area School District =

School district in Pennsylvania

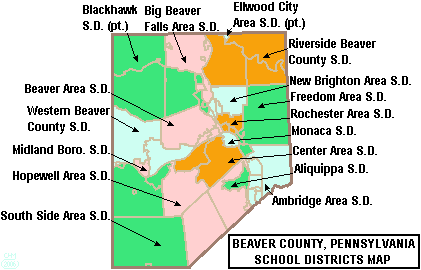

Address
- 901 Duss Avenue Ambridge, Pennsylvania, 15003; United States
- Coordinates: 40.592295°N 80.225945°W

District information
- Type: Public
- Grades: K-12
- Established: 1971
- NCES District ID: 4202440

Students and staff
- District mascot: Bridgers

Other information
- Website: www.ambridge.k12.pa.us

The Ambridge Area School District is a midsized, urban public school district in Beaver County, Pennsylvania. It serves the boroughs of Ambridge, Baden, Economy and South Heights and Harmony Township. The district encompasses approximately 27 square miles (70 km^{2}). According to 2000 United States Census Bureau data, it serves a resident population of 25,022. By 2010, the District's population declined to 23,831 people. The educational attainment levels for the Ambridge Area School District population (25 years old and over) were 89.8% high school graduates and 21.8% college graduates. The district is one of the 500 public school districts of Pennsylvania.

According to the Pennsylvania Budget and Policy Center, 40.6% of the district's pupils lived at 185% or below the Federal Poverty Level as shown by their eligibility for the federal free or reduced price school meal programs in 2012. In 2013, the Pennsylvania Department of Education, reported that 16 students in the Ambridge Area School District were homeless. In 2009, Ambridge Area School District residents’ per capita income was $18,652, while the median family income was $46,294. In Beaver County, the median household income was $49,217. In the Commonwealth, the median family income was $49,501 and the United States median family income was $49,445, in 2010. By 2014, the median household income in the USA was $53,700.

Ambridge Area School District operates five schools: Ambridge Area High School, Ambridge Area Junior High School, Economy Elementary, Highland Elementary and State Street Elementary. High school students may choose to attend the Beaver County Career and Technology Center for training in the construction and mechanical trades. For the 2014-15 school year, 381 resident students chose to enroll in public charter schools and cyber charter schools, rather than attend the district's schools.

The Beaver Valley Intermediate Unit IU27 provides the District with a wide variety of services like: specialized education for disabled students; state mandated training on recognizing and reporting child abuse; speech and visual disability services; criminal background check processing for prospective employees and professional development for staff and faculty.

== Extracurriculars ==
The district offers a variety of clubs, activities and sports.

=== Sports ===
The District funds:

Varsity

Boys

- Baseball - AAAA
- Basketball- AAAA
- Bowling - AAAAAA
- Cross Country - AA
- Football - AAAA
- Golf - AAA
- Soccer - AAA
- Tennis - AA
- Track and Field - AAA
- Volleyball - AA
- Wrestling - AAA

Girls

- Basketball - AAAA
- Bowling - AAAAAA
- Cross Country - AA
- Golf - AA
- Soccer (Fall) - AAA
- Softball - AAAA
- Girls' Tennis - AA
- Track and Field - AAA
- Volleyball - AAA

Junior High Middle School Sports

Boys

- Baseball
- Basketball
- Cross Country
- Football
- Soccer
- Track and Field
- Volleyball
- Wrestling

Girls

- Basketball
- Cross Country
- Soccer
- Softball
- Track and Field
- Volleyball

According to PIAA directory July 2016
