= Conway, Pennsylvania =

Borough in Pennsylvania, US

- Borough
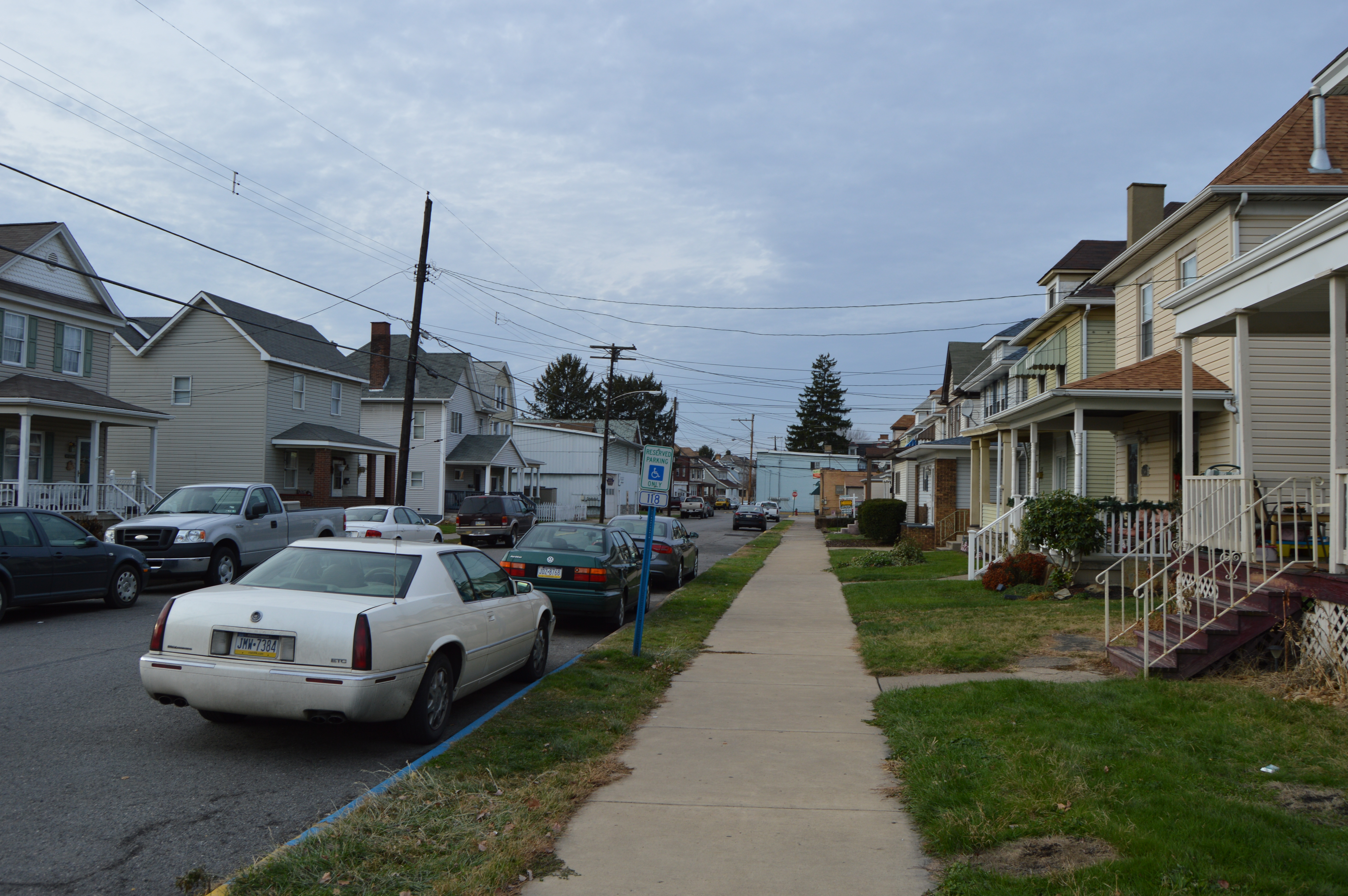
- Houses on Second Avenue
- Interactive map of Conway, Pennsylvania
- Location within Pennsylvania Location within the United States
- Coordinates: 40°39′48″N 80°14′10″W
- Country: United States
- State: Pennsylvania
- County: Beaver
- Incorporated: 1902

Government
  - Type: Borough Council

Area
  - Total: 1.46 sq mi (3.78 km^{2})
  - Land: 1.28 sq mi (3.31 km^{2})
  - Water: 0.18 sq mi (0.47 km^{2})
- Elevation: 909 ft (277 m)

Population (2020)
  - Total: 2,168
  - Density: 1,698.7/sq mi (655.86/km^{2})
- Time zone: UTC-5 (Eastern (EST))
  - Summer (DST): UTC-4 (EDT)
- Zip code: 15027
- Area code: 724
- FIPS code: 42-15872
- Website: conwaypa.org

Conway is a borough in Beaver County, Pennsylvania, United States, located along the Ohio River. At the 2020 census, the borough had a total population of 2,168. It is part of the Pittsburgh metropolitan area. Conway is the site of the Conway Yard, a major railroad classification yard and locomotive facility owned by the Norfolk Southern Railway. From 1956 until 1980, it was the largest rail yard in the world.

== History ==
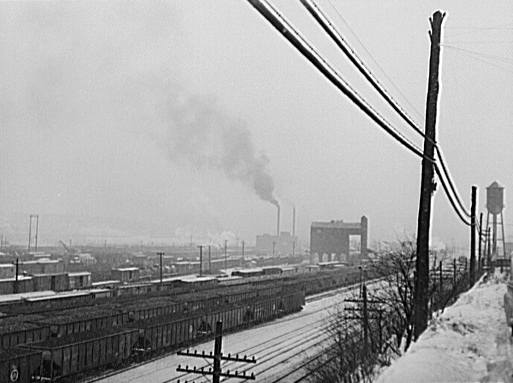
Conway Yard in 1941

The area that would become Conway was first settled by former American Revolutionary War General John McKee, an Irish immigrant, around 1800 through an 800-acre grant of New Sewickley Township. The area had formerly been known as Crow's Run Valley by several tribes of Native Americans because of the abundance of crows that nested in the Hemlock trees of the region. McKee's land extended in to the forest about 2 miles (3.2 km) from the Ohio River.

In 1825 McKee sold 230 acres of his land to Michael Conway, a fellow Irish American. McKee then used the funds to help finance the construction of the first railroad between Pittsburgh and Beaver County, which would later become a branch of the Pennsylvania Railroad. The Conway Yard was built in 1884 by the Pittsburgh, Fort Wayne and Chicago Railway, a subsidiary of the Pennsylvania Railroad. It was expanded in the early 20th century, and again in a massive effort in the 1950s, which made it the largest railway yard in the world for some time. Apart from the railroad, other industries flourished in the production of clay, coal, oil, building stone, brick making and building railroads, primarily through the various endeavors of James I. Park and his sons William A., John H. and George I. Park.

A post office, originally known as Agnew, was created in 1881. The borough was incorporated as Conway on June 3, 1902, with Addru Bepler serving as the town's first mayor.

== Geography ==
Conway is located at 40°39′48″N 80°14′10″W (40.663466, −80.235981).

According to the United States Census Bureau, the borough has a total area of 1.5 square miles (3.9 km^{2}), of which 1.2 square miles (3.1 km^{2}) is land and 0.2 square miles (0.52 km^{2}) (13.70%) is water.

=== Surrounding and adjacent neighborhoods ===
Conway has three land borders, with Freedom and New Sewickley Township to the north, and Economy from the east to the south. Across the Ohio River, Conway runs adjacent with Monaca and Center Township.

== Demographics ==
Historical population
Census	Pop.	Note	%±
1910	1,483		—
1920	1,858		25.3%
1930	2,014		8.4%
1940	1,865		−7.4%
1950	1,570		−15.8%
1960	1,926		22.7%
1970	2,822		46.5%
1980	2,747		−2.7%
1990	2,424		−11.8%
2000	2,290		−5.5%
2010	2,176		−5.0%
2020	2,168		−0.4%
2021 (est.)	2,144	▼	−1.1%

At the 2000 census, there were 2,290 people, 988 households, and 656 families living in the borough. The population density was 707.3/square kilometer; (1,825.3/square mile). There were 1,026 housing units at an average density of 316.9/square kilometer; (817.8/square mile). The racial makeup of the borough was 98.25% White, 1.27% African American, 0.04% Native American, 0.04% from other races, and 0.39% from two or more races. Hispanic or Latino of any race were 0.48% of the population.

There were 988 households, 23.7% had children under the age of 18 living with them, 53.8% were married couples living together, 8.9% had a female householder with no husband present, and 33.6% were non-families. 31.0% of households were made up of individuals, and 19.2% were one person aged 65 or older. The average household size was 2.30 and the average family size was 2.87.

In the borough the population was spread out, with 18.7% under the age of 18, 7.1% from 18 to 24, 25.4% from 25 to 44, 25.4% from 45 to 64, and 23.4% 65 or older. The median age was 44 years. For every 100 females, there were 89.4 males. For every 100 females aged 18 and over, there were 85.4 males.

The median household income was $34,181 and the median family income was $46,250. Males had a median income of $36,167 versus $23,516 for females. The per capita income for the borough was $18,699. About 4.8% of families and 7.6% of the population were below the poverty line, including 7.1% of those under the age of 18 and 10.0% of those ages 65 and older.

== Education ==
Children in Conway are served by the Freedom Area School District. The current schools serving Conway are:

- Freedom Area Elementary School – grades K–4
- Freedom Area Middle School – grades 5–8
- Freedom Area High School – grades 9–12

== See also ==
- List of cities and towns along the Ohio River
