= New Sewickley Township, Pennsylvania =

Township in Pennsylvania, US

Coordinates: 40°43′N 80°14′W

- Township
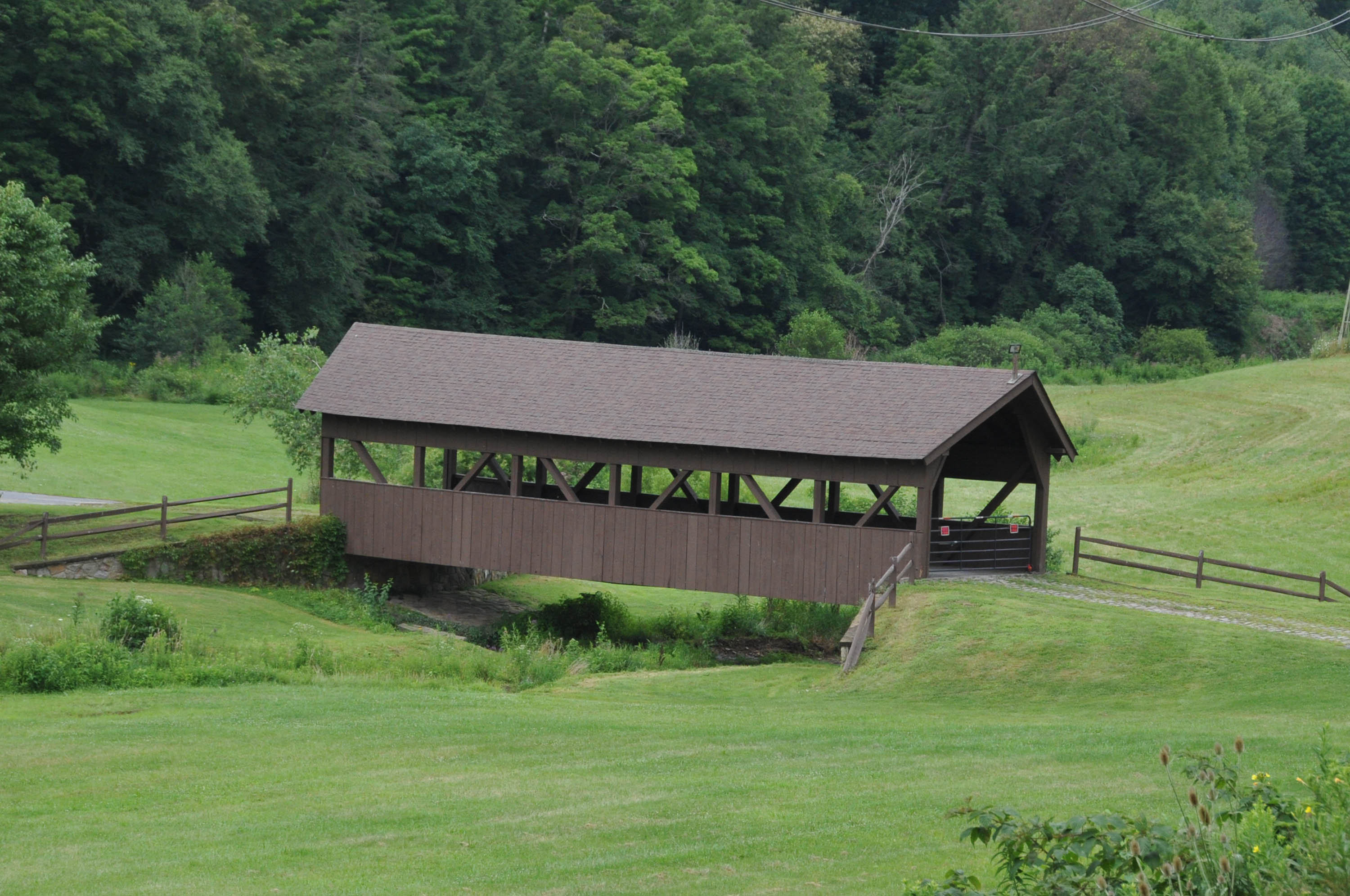
- Hoffarosa Covered Bridge

- Location in Beaver County and state of Pennsylvania
- Country: United States
- State: Pennsylvania
- County: Beaver
- Incorporated: 1801

Area
  - Total: 32.69 sq mi (84.67 km^{2})
  - Land: 32.69 sq mi (84.67 km^{2})
  - Water: 0 sq mi (0.00 km^{2})

Population (2020)
  - Total: 7,163 ▼
  - Estimate (2021): 7,092
  - Density: 230/sq mi (87/km^{2})
- Time zone: UTC-5 (Eastern (EST))
  - Summer (DST): UTC-4 (EDT)
- Postal codes: 15042, 15066, 15074, 16063
- Area code: 724
- FIPS code: 42-007-54072
- Website: newsewickley.com

New Sewickley Township is a township in Beaver County, Pennsylvania, United States. The population was 7,164 at the 2020 census. It is part of the Pittsburgh metropolitan area.

== History ==
New Sewickley Township is a part of Depreciation Lands that were set aside by Act of Assembly on March 12, 1783, to be awarded to those men who served in the American Revolutionary War. In 1801 the original Sewickley Township was divided and New Sewickley Township was created. At that time, New Sewickley Township was situated in the eastern part of Beaver County and was composed of about 19,279 acres (78.02 km^{2}) of hilly, but very fertile land. Over the next 28 years, New Sewickley Township was reduced in size by forming Economy Borough, Rochester Township and Pulaski Township. Despite being the closest municipality in Beaver County in proximity to Cranberry Township and where I-76 and I-79 meet, New Sewickley is predominantly rural and undeveloped.

== Geography ==
The township is located in eastern Beaver County. According to the United States Census Bureau, the township has a total area of 32.7 square miles (84.7 km^{2}), all land.

=== Surrounding neighborhoods ===
New Sewickley Township has eight borders, including Marion Township to the north, Economy to the south, Conway and Freedom to the southwest, Rochester and Daugherty Townships to the west, and the Butler County townships of Jackson to the northeast and Cranberry to the east.

== Demographics ==
Historical population
Census	Pop.	Note	%±
1970	5,719		—
1980	7,340		28.3%
1990	6,861		−6.5%
2000	7,076		3.1%
2010	7,360		4.0%
2020	7,164		−2.7%
2021 (est.)	7,092		−1.0%
U.S. Decennial Census

As of the 2000 census, there were 7,076 people, 2,736 households, and 2,093 families residing in the township. The population density was 216.6 inhabitants per square mile (83.6/km^{2}). There were 2,879 housing units at an average density of 88.1 per square mile (34.0/km^{2}). The racial makeup of the township was 98.98% White, 0.17% African American, 0.13% Native American, 0.16% Asian, 0.01% from other races, and 0.55% from two or more races. Hispanic or Latino of any race were 0.34% of the population.

There were 2,736 households, out of which 30.4% had children under the age of 18 living with them, 65.0% were married living together, 8.0% had a female householder with no husband present, and 23.5% were non-families. 19.6% of all households were made up of individuals, and 8.3% had someone living alone who was 65 years of age or older. The average household size was 2.59 and the average family size was 2.97.

In the township the population was spread out, with 22.9% under the age of 18, 7.5% from 18 to 24, 29.0% from 25 to 44, 25.9% from 45 to 64, and 14.8% who were 65 years of age or older. The median age was 40 years. For every 100 females there were 100.2 males. For every 100 females age 18 and over, there were 97.6 males.

The median income for a household in the township was $42,614, and the median income for a family was $47,381. Males had a median income of $36,206 versus $21,732 for females. The per capita income for the township was $18,147. About 4.8% of families and 6.8% of the population were below the poverty line, including 8.2% of those under age 18 and 3.6% of those age 65 or over.
