= Economy, Pennsylvania =

Borough in Pennsylvania, US

- Borough
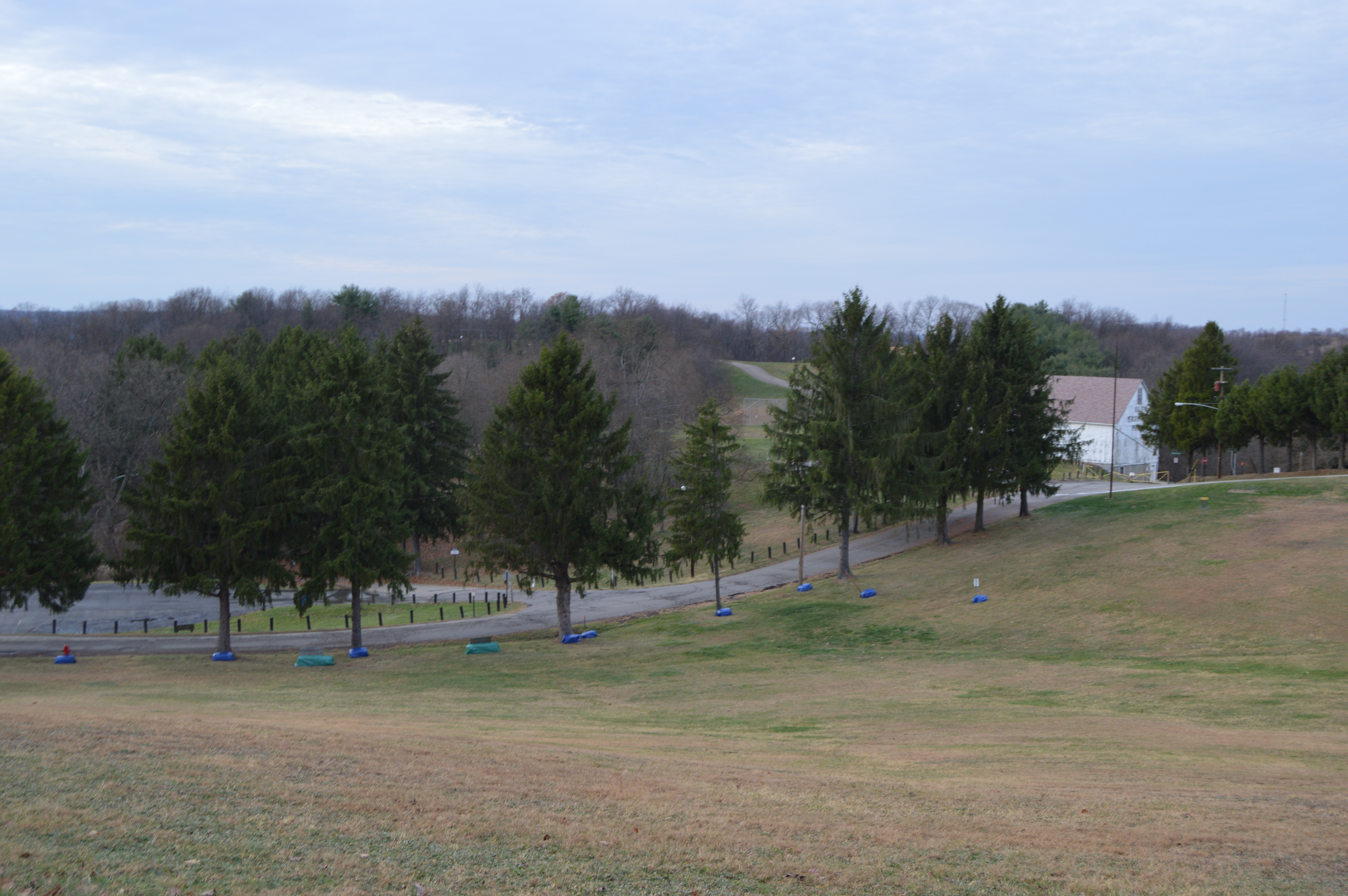
- Fields at Old Economy County Park
- Interactive map of Economy, Pennsylvania
- Location within Pennsylvania Location within the United States
- Coordinates: 40°38′18″N 80°11′06″W
- Country: United States
- State: Pennsylvania
- County: Beaver
- Incorporated: 1827 (township); 1957 (borough)

Government
  - Type: Borough Council

Area
  - Total: 17.92 sq mi (46.41 km^{2})
  - Land: 17.87 sq mi (46.29 km^{2})
  - Water: 0.050 sq mi (0.13 km^{2})
- Elevation: 971 ft (296 m)

Population (2020)
  - Total: 9,098
  - Density: 509.1/sq mi (196.56/km^{2})
- Time zone: UTC-5 (Eastern (EST))
  - Summer (DST): UTC-4 (EDT)
- Zip code: 15003, 15005, 15042, 15143
- Area code: 724
- FIPS code: 42-22264
- Website: https://www.economyborough.org/

Economy is a borough in Beaver County, Pennsylvania, United States. The population was 9,098 at the 2020 census. It is a part of the Pittsburgh metropolitan area.

== History ==
Economy Township was established in 1827 and named for Economy, the planned village built by the Harmony Society on the banks of the Ohio River at what is now called Old Economy Village, in the borough of Ambridge. In 1957 residents of Economy Township petitioned for borough status in order to prevent further annexation by surrounding communities. The borough of Economy was established on January 1, 1958.

== Geography ==
Economy is located at 40°38′18″N 80°11′6″W (40.638466, −80.184891).

According to the United States Census Bureau, the borough has a total area of 17.8 square miles (46 km^{2}), of which 17.7 square miles (46 km^{2}) is land and 0.1 square miles (0.26 km^{2}) (0.39%) is water.

=== Surrounding neighborhoods ===
Economy borders seven municipalities, including New Sewickley Township to the north, Harmony Township and Baden to the west, Conway to the northwest, and the Allegheny County neighborhoods of Marshall Township to the east, Franklin Park to the southeast and Bell Acres to the south.

== Demographics ==
Historical population
Census	Pop.	Note	%±
1890	413		—
1960	5,925		—
1970	7,176		21.1%
1980	9,538		32.9%
1990	9,519		−0.2%
2000	9,363		−1.6%
2010	8,970		−4.2%
2020	9,098		1.4%
2021 (est.)	9,003	▼	−1.0%

As of the 2000 census, there were 9,363 people, 3,528 households, and 2,854 families residing in the borough. The population density was 529.0 inhabitants per square mile (204.2/km^{2}). There were 3,629 housing units at an average density of 205.0 per square mile (79.2/km^{2}). The racial makeup of the borough was 98.33% White, 0.66% African American, 0.10% Native American, 0.28% Asian, 0.13% from other races, and 0.50% from two or more races. Hispanic or Latino of any race were 0.44% of the population.

There were 3,528 households, out of which 30.8% had children under the age of 18 living with them, 72.1% were married couples living together, 5.9% had a female householder with no husband present, and 19.1% were non-families. 16.7% of all households were made up of individuals, and 8.0% had someone living alone who was 65 years of age or older. The average household size was 2.65 and the average family size was 2.99.

In the borough the population was spread out, with 22.2% under the age of 18, 6.5% from 18 to 24, 28.1% from 25 to 44, 29.6% from 45 to 64, and 13.6% who were 65 years of age or older. The median age was 42 years. For every 100 females there were 99.6 males. For every 100 females age 18 and over, there were 98.0 males.

The median income for a household in the borough was $52,446, and the median income for a family was $60,081. Males had a median income of $41,756 versus $27,121 for females. The per capita income for the borough was $22,453. About 2.0% of families and 2.4% of the population were below the poverty line, including 2.2% of those under age 18 and 5.8% of those age 65 or over.

== Education ==
Children in Economy are served by the Ambridge Area School District. The current schools serving Economy are:

- Economy Elementary School – grades K–5
- Ambridge Area Middle School – grades 6–8
- Ambridge Area High School – grades 9–12

== See also ==
- Old Economy Village
- Ambridge, Pennsylvania
- Harmony Society
- George Rapp
- Harmony, Pennsylvania
- New Harmony, Indiana
