= Sewickley Township, Beaver County, Pennsylvania =

Coordinates: 40°47′N 80°14′W

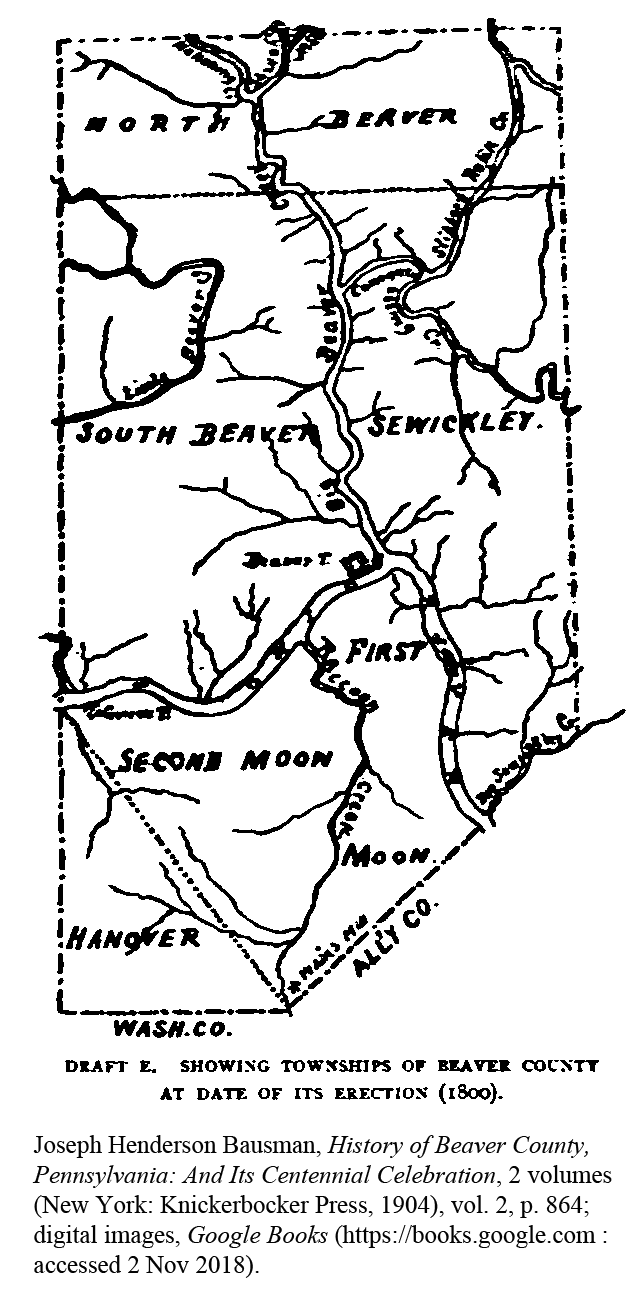

Sewickley Township was a township that was located in Allegheny County, Pennsylvania, from 1797 until 1800, and after in Beaver County until the town's extinction in 1801.

== History ==
Sewickley Township was created in 1797 when Pine Township, Allegheny County, was divided by the east line of Breading's District of Depreciation Lands, and the part west of that line was called "Sewickley Township."

Because the township predated the creation of Beaver County, the township originally held parts of what would become Beaver County east of the Beaver River as part of Allegheny County. After the formation of Beaver County in 1800, Sewickley was given the same territory, now as one of the counties' original townships.

While no clear record has been found, it appears that Sewickley Township was divided into New Sewickley and North Sewickley townships in 1801 and then subsequently ceased to exist.
