= Freedom Area Senior High School =

Location
- 1190 Bulldog Drive; Freedom, Pennsylvania 15042; United States; 40.6781°N 80.2406°W

Information
- Type: Public high school
- Established: 1900
- School district: Freedom Area School District
- Principal: Steven Mott
- Teaching staff: 31.30 (FTE)
- Grades: 9-12
- Enrollment: 366 (2024-2025)
- Student to teacher ratio: 11.69
- Campus type: Large Suburb
- Colors: Red and White
- Athletics conference: Western Pennsylvania Interscholastic Athletic League
- Team name: Bulldogs
- Newspaper: FHS Press
- Yearbook: Shawnee
- Website: High School

Freedom Area Senior High School is a public high school in Freedom, Pennsylvania, United States. It is the only high school in the Freedom Area School District. Athletic teams compete as the Freedom Bulldogs in the Western Pennsylvania Interscholastic Athletic League.
