= Marion Township, Beaver County, Pennsylvania =

Township in Pennsylvania, US

Coordinates: 40°47′11″N 80°12′08″W

Marion Township, Pennsylvania
- Township
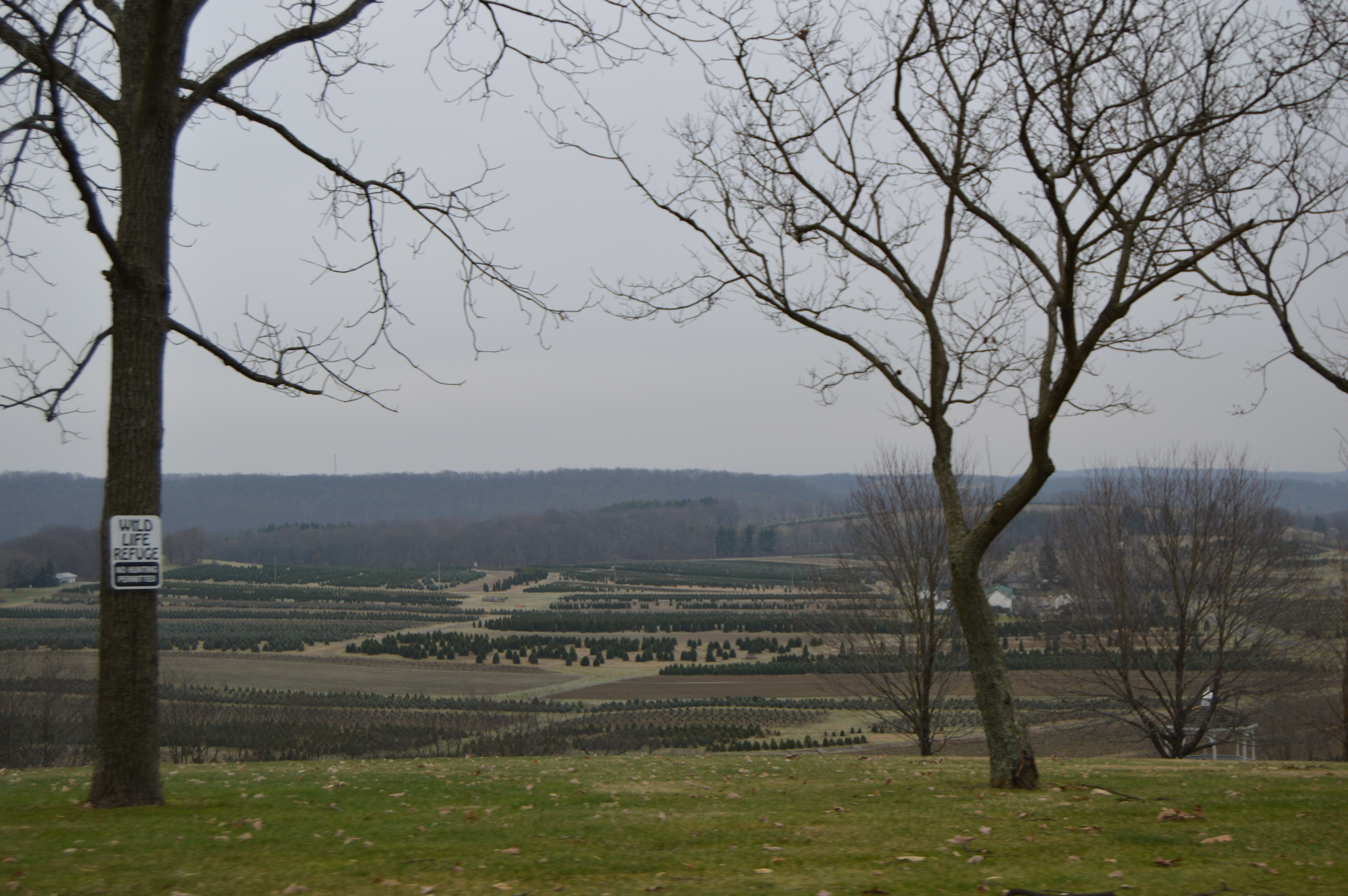
- Christmas tree farm in the township's northwest

- Location in Beaver County and state of Pennsylvania
- Country: United States
- State: Pennsylvania
- County: Beaver
- Incorporated: 1845

Area
  - Total: 10.36 sq mi (26.84 km^{2})
  - Land: 10.25 sq mi (26.54 km^{2})
  - Water: 0.12 sq mi (0.31 km^{2})

Population (2020)
  - Total: 800 ▼
  - Estimate (2022): 790
  - Density: 87.2/sq mi (33.65/km^{2})
- Time zone: UTC-5 (Eastern (EST))
  - Summer (DST): UTC-4 (EDT)
- FIPS code: 42-007-47432
- Website: Website

Marion Township is a township that is located in Beaver County, Pennsylvania, United States. The population was 800 at the time of the 2020 census.

It is part of the Pittsburgh metropolitan area.

== Geography ==
The township is located in northeastern Beaver County. According to the United States Census Bureau, the township has a total area of 10.5 square miles (27.2 km^{2}), of which 10.3 square miles (26.6 km^{2}) is land and 0.23 square miles (0.6 km^{2}), or 2.26%, is water.

=== Surrounding neighborhoods ===
Marion Township has five borders, with Franklin Township to the north, New Sewickley Township to the south, North Sewickley Township to the west, and the Butler County neighborhoods of Zelienople to the east and Jackson Township to the southeast.

== Demographics ==
Historical population
Census	Pop.	Note	%±
1970	1,292		—
1980	941		−27.2%
1990	909		−3.4%
2000	940		3.4%
2010	913		−2.9%
2020	800		−12.4%
2022 (est.)	790		−1.2%
U.S. Decennial Census

As of the 2000 census, there were 940 people, 361 households, and 264 families residing in the township.

The population density was 91.5 inhabitants per square mile (35.3/km^{2}). There were 388 housing units at an average density of 37.8 per square mile (14.6/km^{2}).

The racial makeup of the township was 98.19% White, 0.64% African American, 0.11% Pacific Islander, and 1.06% from two or more races. Hispanic or Latino of any race were 0.74% of the population.

There were 361 households, out of which 32.4% had children under the age of 18 living with them; 62.6% were married couples living together, 7.8% had a female householder with no husband present, and 26.6% were non-families. 21.9% of all households were made up of individuals, and about 7% had someone living alone who was 65 years of age or older.

The average household size was 2.60 and the average family size was 3.08.

Within the township, the population was spread out, with 24.5% of residents who were under the age of 18, 7.9% who were aged 18 to 24, 31.7% who were aged 25 to 44, 24.6% who were aged 45 to 64, and 11.4% who were 65 years of age or older. The median age was 39 years.

For every 100 females there were about 98 males. For every 100 females who were aged 18 or older, there were 96.1 males.

The median income for a household in the township was $43,365, and the median income for a family was $50,000. Males had a median income of $34,688 compared with that of $24,327 for females.

The per capita income for the township was $20,808.

Approximately 7.3% of families and 10.0% of the population were living below the poverty line, including 15.7% of those who were under the age of 18 and 8.5% of those who were aged 15 or older.
