= Baden, Pennsylvania =

Borough in Pennsylvania, US

- Borough
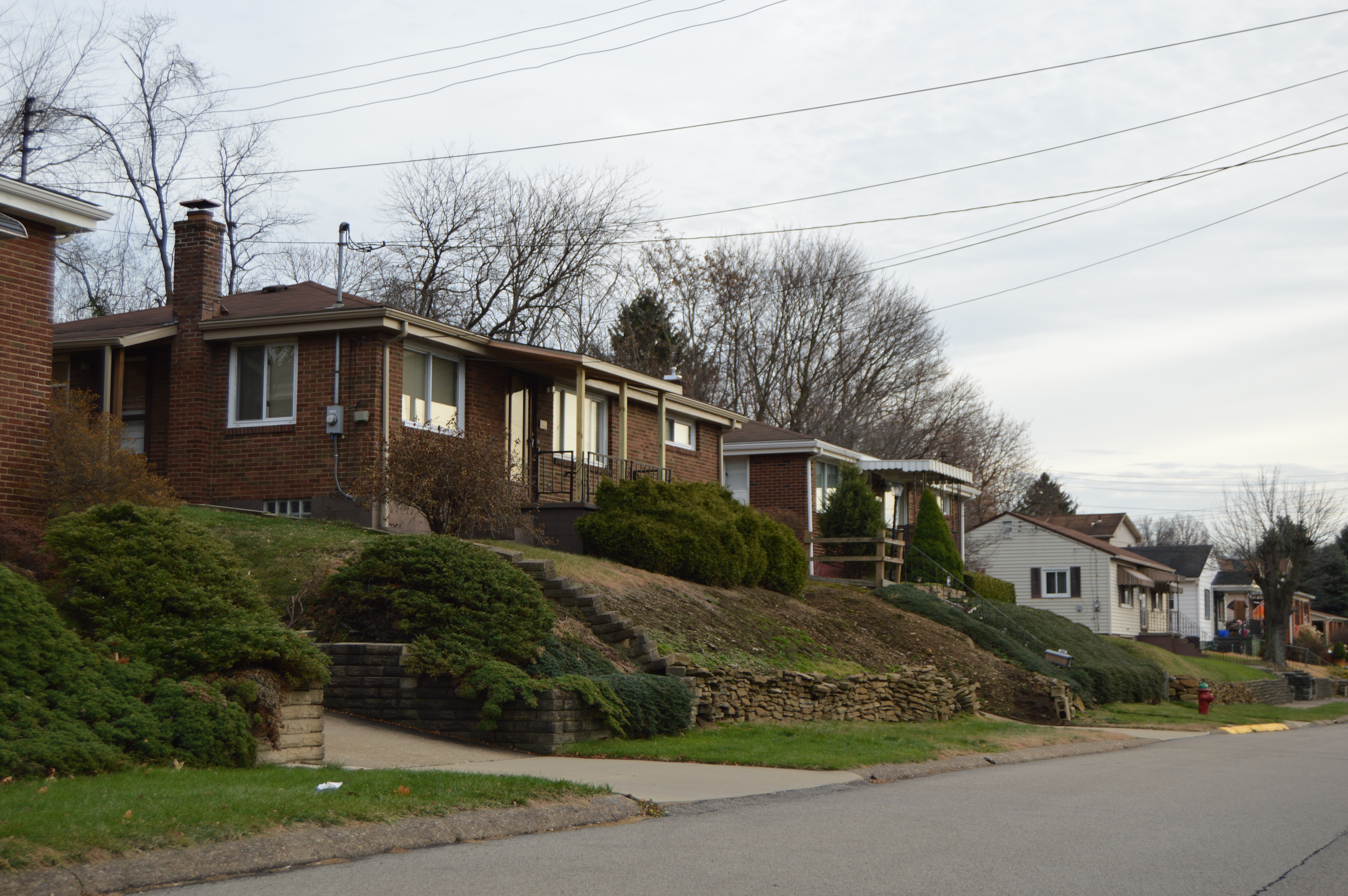
- Residential neighborhood on Berry Street
- Interactive map of Baden, Pennsylvania
- Location within Pennsylvania Location within the United States
- Coordinates: 40°38′23″N 80°13′36″W
- Country: United States
- State: Pennsylvania
- County: Beaver
- Settled: 1838
- Incorporated: 1858
- Named after: Baden-Baden, Germany

Government
  - Type: Borough Council

Area
  - Total: 2.48 sq mi (6.43 km^{2})
  - Land: 2.26 sq mi (5.86 km^{2})
  - Water: 0.22 sq mi (0.58 km^{2})
- Elevation: 827 ft (252 m)

Population (2020)
  - Total: 3,904
  - Density: 1,726.9/sq mi (666.76/km^{2})
- Time zone: UTC-5 (Eastern (EST))
  - Summer (DST): UTC-4 (EDT)
- Zip code: 15005
- Area code: 724
- FIPS code: 42-03736
- Website: https://badenborough.com/

Baden is a borough in southeastern Beaver County, Pennsylvania, along the Ohio River. The population was 3,904 at the 2020 census. It is part of the Pittsburgh metropolitan area. Baden is the former site of Logstown, a significant Native American settlement.

== History ==
The site of Baden was the location of Logstown, a Native American village. The Treaty of Logstown was signed by representatives of the Iroquois Confederation, Lenape and Shawnee leaders there; George Washington visited the area to speak with the Natives himself under Queen Alliquippa. The oldest recorded house in Baden was built in the early 1800s, and it became a stopping place for farmers on their way to Pittsburgh to sell their livestock. Baden was founded as a village in 1838 and was named after the German resort town of Baden-Baden at the border of the Black Forest.

Early on, Baden was home to boat building yards, quarries, a lath mill and a gristmill. After Baden was established as a borough in 1858, it grew with the appearance of steel mills and oil wells in the area as well as the growth of the railroads, including the nearby Conway Yard, now operated by Norfolk Southern.

== Geography ==
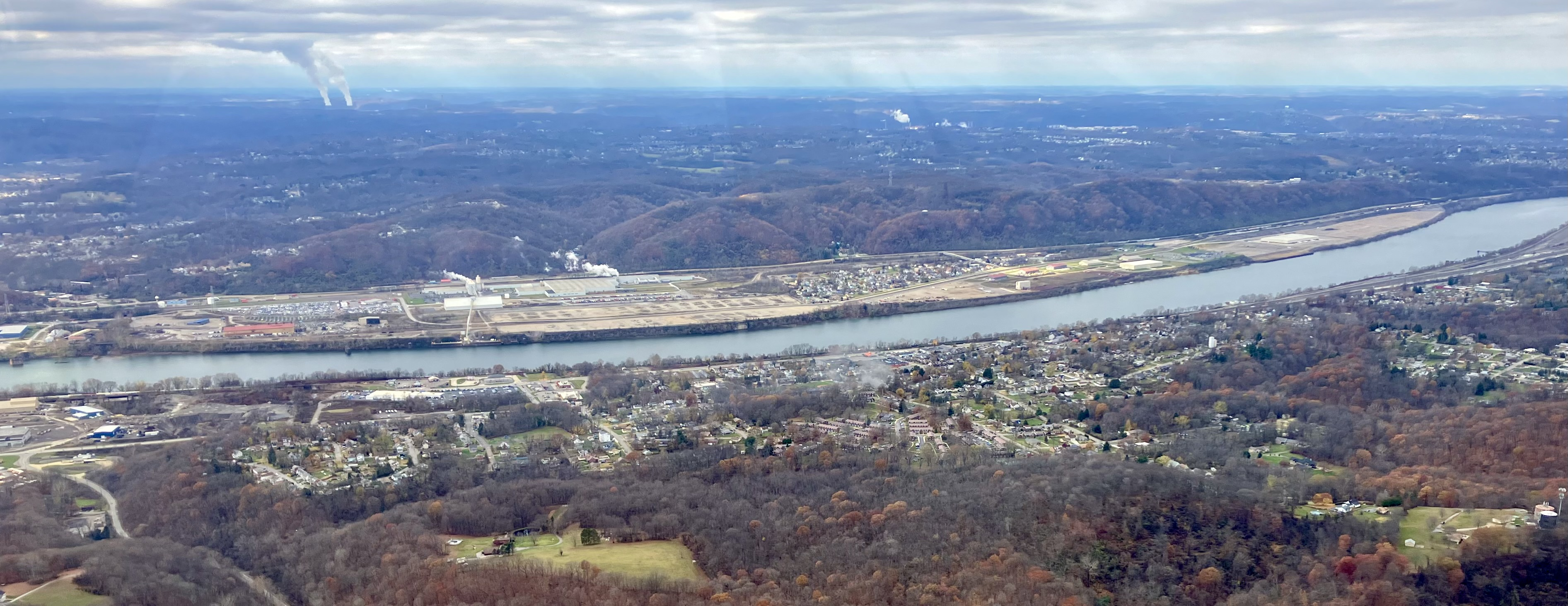
Baden from 1300ft above the ground (near side of the river bank)

Baden is located at 40°38′23″N 80°13′36″W (40.639847, −80.226727). It is approximately 20 miles northwest of Pittsburgh.

According to the United States Census Bureau, the borough has a total area of 2.5 square miles (6.5 km^{2}), of which 2.3 square miles (6.0 km^{2}) is land and 0.2 square miles (0.5 km^{2}) (8.03%) is water.

=== Surrounding communities ===
Baden borders two municipalities, with Economy to the north and east, and Harmony Township to the south. Across the Ohio River, Baden runs adjacent with Aliquippa and Hopewell Township.

== Demographics ==
Historical population
Census	Pop.	Note	%±
1880	400		—
1890	390		−2.5%
1900	427		9.5%
1910	601		40.7%
1920	805		33.9%
1930	1,924		139.0%
1940	2,135		11.0%
1950	3,732		74.8%
1960	6,109		63.7%
1970	5,536		−9.4%
1980	5,318		−3.9%
1990	5,074		−4.6%
2000	4,377		−13.7%
2010	4,135		−5.5%
2020	3,904		−5.6%
2021 (est.)	3,864	▼	−1.0%

=== 2020 census ===
As of the 2020 census, Baden had a population of 3,904. The median age was 49.9 years. 14.7% of residents were under the age of 18 and 27.9% of residents were 65 years of age or older. For every 100 females there were 93.4 males, and for every 100 females age 18 and over there were 90.0 males age 18 and over.

100.0% of residents lived in urban areas, while 0.0% lived in rural areas.

There were 1,876 households in Baden, of which 18.4% had children under the age of 18 living in them. Of all households, 38.0% were married-couple households, 23.2% were households with a male householder and no spouse or partner present, and 31.3% were households with a female householder and no spouse or partner present. About 40.1% of all households were made up of individuals and 19.4% had someone living alone who was 65 years of age or older.

There were 2,032 housing units, of which 7.7% were vacant. The homeowner vacancy rate was 0.9% and the rental vacancy rate was 11.9%.

Racial composition as of the 2020 census
Race	Number	Percent
White	3,613	92.5%
Black or African American	76	1.9%
American Indian and Alaska Native	6	0.2%
Asian	18	0.5%
Native Hawaiian and Other Pacific Islander	0	0.0%
Some other race	12	0.3%
Two or more races	179	4.6%
Hispanic or Latino (of any race)	58	1.5%

=== 2010 census ===
As of the 2010 census, there were 4,135 people, 1,897 households, and 1,081 families residing in the borough. The population density was 1,913.8 inhabitants per square mile (738.9/km^{2}). There were 1,995 housing units at an average density of 868.4 per square mile (335.3/km^{2}). The racial makeup of the borough was 96.9% White, 1.5% African American, 0.1% Native American, 0.3% Asian, 0.2% from other races, and 1.0% from two or more races. Hispanic or Latino of any race were 0.9% of the population.

There were 1,897 households, out of which 36.6% had children under the age of 18 living with them, 40.8% were married couples living together, 11.8% had a female householder with no husband present, and 43.0% were non-families. 37.4% of all households were made up of individuals, and 17.4% had someone living alone who was 65 years of age or older. The average household size was 2.08 and the average family size was 2.72.

In the borough the population was spread out, with 17.2% under the age of 18, 6.1% from 18 to 24, 23.5% from 25 to 44, 28.2% from 45 to 64, and 24.9% who were 65 years of age or older. The median age was 47.3 years. For every 100 females, there were 87.3 males. For every 100 females age 18 and over, there were 79.9 males.

=== Income and poverty ===
In 2000, the median income for a household in the borough was $32,924, and the median income for a family was $40,924. Males had a median income of $31,025 versus $23,813 for females. The per capita income for the borough was $17,112. About 5.1% of families and 7.9% of the population were below the poverty line, including 12.5% of those under age 18 and 9.2% of those age 65 or over.

== Education ==
Children in Baden are served by the Ambridge Area School District. The current schools serving Baden are:

- State Street Elementary School – grades K–5
- Ambridge Area Middle School – grades 6–8
- Ambridge Area High School – grades 9–12

The community is also served by the Baden Academy private charter school.

== See also ==
- List of cities and towns along the Ohio River
- Legionville
