= West Aliquippa, Pennsylvania =

Village in Pennsylvania, U.S.

Coordinates: 40.591°N 80.321°W

West Aliquippa is a neighborhood of the city of Aliquippa, Pennsylvania, United States, located along the Ohio River north of the rest of Aliquippa.

West Aliquippa is part of the Aliquippa City School District. Jazz musician Henry Mancini was raised in West Aliquippa. His father was a steel worker there starting in the 1920s. During this time, nearly all of West Aliquippa was made up of Italian immigrants.
