= Harmony Township, Beaver County, Pennsylvania =

Township in Pennsylvania, US

Harmony Township, Pennsylvania
- Township
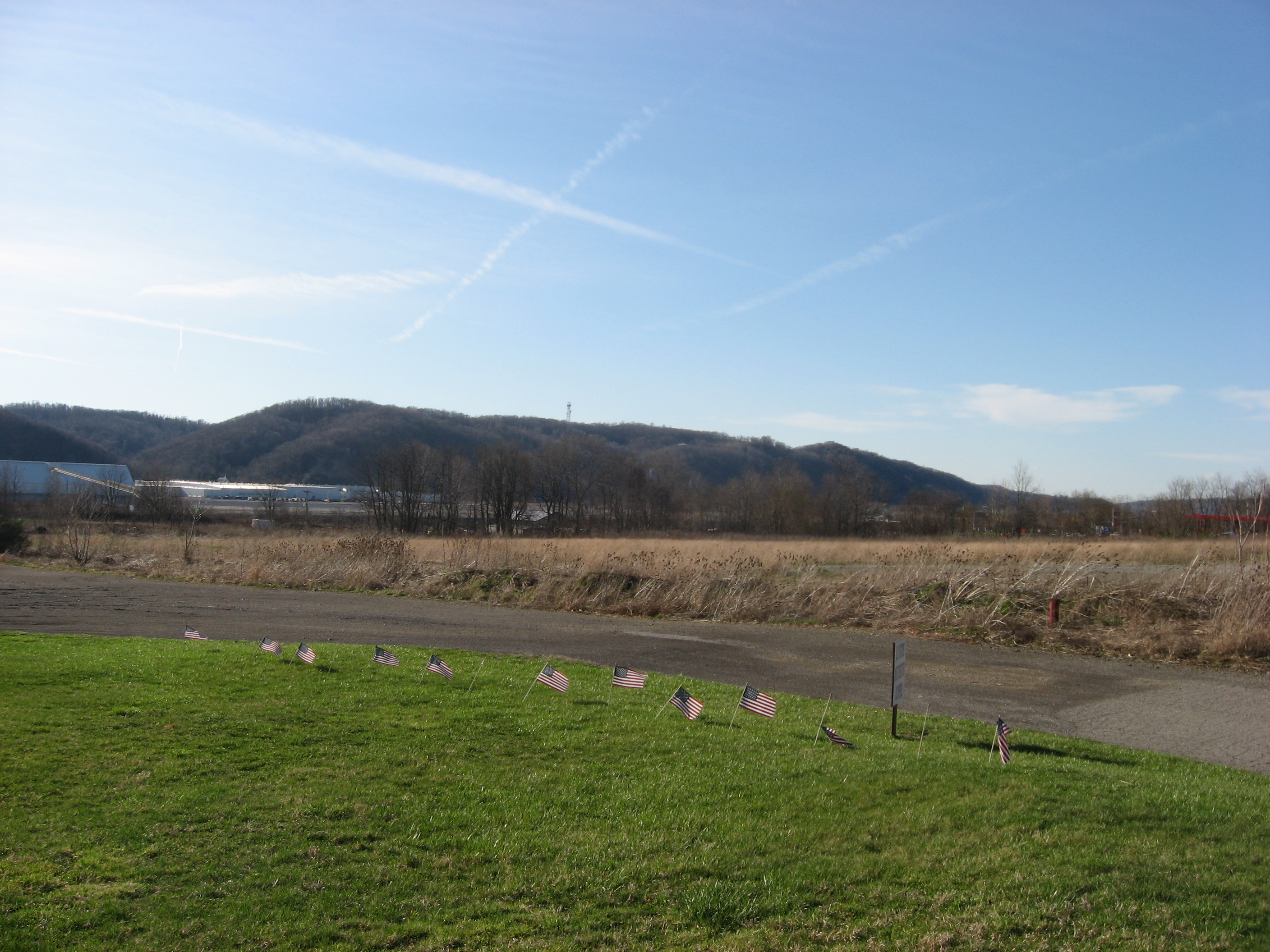
- Fields at Legionville, a historic United States Army site in Harmony Township

- Location in Beaver County and state of Pennsylvania
- Coordinates: 40°36′26″N 80°13′13″W
- Country: United States
- State: Pennsylvania
- County: Beaver
- Settled: 1772
- Incorporated: 1851

Area
  - Total: 3.07 sq mi (7.95 km^{2})
  - Land: 2.91 sq mi (7.53 km^{2})
  - Water: 0.16 sq mi (0.41 km^{2})

Population (2020)
  - Total: 3,195 ▼
  - Estimate (2022): 3,128
  - Density: 1,060/sq mi (409.3/km^{2})
- Time zone: UTC-5 (Eastern (EST))
  - Summer (DST): UTC-4 (EDT)
- FIPS code: 42-007-32680
- Website: harmonytwp.com

Harmony Township is a township and census-designated place in Beaver County, Pennsylvania, United States. The population was 3,195 at the 2020 census. It is part of the Pittsburgh metropolitan area.

== Geography ==
Harmony Township is located in southeastern Beaver County at 40°36′25″N 80°13′13″W (40.607217, -80.220321).

According to the United States Census Bureau, Harmony Township has a total area of 3.1 square miles (7.9 km^{2}), of which 2.9 square miles (7.5 km^{2}) is land and 0.15 square miles (0.4 km^{2}), or 5.21%, is water.

=== Surrounding and adjacent neighborhoods ===
Harmony Township has four land borders, including Baden to the north, Economy to the east, Ambridge to the southwest, and the Allegheny County neighborhood of Leet Township to the south. Across the Ohio River to the west, Harmony Township runs adjacent with Aliquippa.

== Demographics ==
Historical population
Census	Pop.	Note	%±
1970	5,022		—
1980	3,977		−20.8%
1990	3,694		−7.1%
2000	3,373		−8.7%
2010	3,197		−5.2%
2020	3,195		−0.1%
2022 (est.)	3,128		−2.1%
U.S. Decennial Census

As of the census of 2000, there were 3,373 people, 1,439 households, and 991 families residing in the township. The population density was 1,176.3 inhabitants per square mile (454.2/km^{2}). There were 1,509 housing units at an average density of 526.2 units per square mile (203.2 units/km^{2}). The racial makeup of the township was 97.48% White, 1.45% Black or African American, 0.12% Asian, 0.12% Pacific Islander, 0.21% from other races, and 0.62% from two or more races. Hispanic or Latino of any race were 0.56% of the population.

There were 1,439 households, out of which 23.7% had children under the age of 18 living with them, 55.9% were married couples living together, 9.2% had a female householder with no husband present, and 31.1% were non-families. 28.2% of all households were made up of individuals, and 19.2% had someone living alone who was 65 years of age or older. The average household size was 2.33 and the average family size was 2.84.

In the township the population was spread out, with 19.1% under the age of 18, 5.3% from 18 to 24, 26.9% from 25 to 44, 21.8% from 45 to 64, and 26.8% who were 65 years of age or older. The median age was 44 years. For every 100 females, there were 90.8 males. For every 100 females age 18 and over, there were 87.7 males.

The median income for a household in the township was $37,056, and the median income for a family was $48,824. Males had a median income of $35,682 versus $24,464 for females. The per capita income for the township was $18,663. About 2.6% of families and 4.7% of the population were below the poverty line, including 4.0% of those under age 18 and 3.9% of those age 65 or over.
