= Beaver Area School District =

School district in Pennsylvania, United States

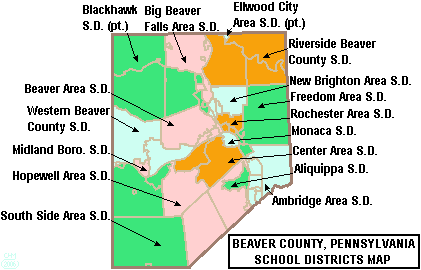

Address
- 855 Second Street Beaver, Pennsylvania, 15009; United States
- Coordinates: 40.69162°N 80.30681°W

District information
- Type: Public
- Grades: K-12
- Schools: 4 total: Beaver Area Middle School; Beaver Area Senior High School; College Square Elementary School; Dutch Ridge Elementary School
- NCES District ID: 4203120

Students and staff
- Teachers: 120
- District mascot: Bobcats
- Colors: Maroon; Gray

Other information
- Website: www.basd.k12.pa.us

Beaver Area School District is a suburban, public school district in Beaver County, Pennsylvania, United States. The district encompasses approximately 21 square miles (54 km^{2}) serving the Boroughs of Beaver and Bridgewater and Brighton Township and Vanport Township in Beaver County, Pennsylvania. The district serves a resident population of 14,993 people.

The district operates one High School, one Middle School and two Elementary Schools.

- Elementary - College Square grades (grades K–2)
- Elementary/Intermediate - Dutch Ridge (grades 3–6)
- Beaver Area Middle School (BAMS) (grades 7–8)
- Beaver Area High School (BHS) (grades 9–12)

== Extracurriculars ==
The district offers a variety of clubs, activities and sports. They also offer classes to choose from, such as JROTC, band, orchestra, mock trial, and extra math classes.

=== Athletics ===
Beaver's athletic teams all fall under the name Beaver Bobcats. Beaver Area is a member the PIAA (Pennsylvania Interscholastic Athletic Association) and the WPIAL (Western Pennsylvania Interscholastic Athletic League). Varsity Sports:

Varsity Boys

- Baseball
- Basketball
- Football
- Golf
- Soccer
- Tennis
- Cross Country
- Track and Field
- Archery
- Swimming
- Wrestling

Varsity Girls

- Softball
- Basketball
- Volleyball
- Soccer
- Tennis
- Cross Country
- Track and Field
- Swimming
- Archery

=== Middle School and Junior High ===
Middle School and Junior High Sports – A middle school team is open only to students in 7th and 8th grade, and a junior high team includes 7th through 9th graders.

Fall

- Middle School Boys Soccer
- Middle School Girls Soccer
- Middle School Boys Cross Country
- Middle School Girls Cross Country
- Middle School Girls Basketball
- Middle School Football

Winter

- Middle School Wrestling
- Middle School Boys Basketball
- Middle School Swimming
- Junior High Boys Basketball (grade 9 only)
- Hockey (club sport)

Spring

- Middle School Girls Volleyball
- Middle School Boys Track and Field
- Middle School Girls Track and Field
- Middle School Baseball

== Notable alumni ==
- Amber Brkich, winner of Survivor: All-Stars
- O. Richard Bundy, Penn State Marching Blue Band director (1983–2015)
- John Burkett, MLB pitcher (1987-2003), National League All-Star (1993 and 2001) and currently a professional bowler
- Jerald Ingram, New York Giants current running backs coach
- John Skorupan, NFL linebacker (1973–1980), and Penn State (1969–1972) All-American
- Johannes Weertman, noted glaciologist with a long career teaching at Northwestern University
