= Beaver Area High School =

Location
- 1 Gypsy Glen Road; Beaver, Pennsylvania 15009; United States; 40.6967°N 80.3194°W

Information
- Type: Public, coeducational high school
- Established: 1899
- School district: Beaver Area School District
- Superintendent: Dr. Sean Aiken
- CEEB code: 390200
- Principal: Sean Snowden
- Teaching staff: 41.49 (FTE)
- Grades: 9-12
- Enrollment: 650 (2024-2025)
- Student to teacher ratio: 15.67
- Campus type: Large suburb
- Colors: Maroon and grey
- Slogan: "Where tradition dictates a standard of excellence"
- Athletics: Yes
- Athletics conference: Western Pennsylvania Interscholastic Athletic League
- Mascot: Bobcat
- Team name: Bobcats
- Newspaper: BASD Echo
- Yearbook: SHINGAS
- Athletic Director: Alan Alcalde
- Website: www.basd.k12.pa.us/beaverareahighschool_home.aspx

Beaver Area High School is a public high school in Beaver, Pennsylvania, United States. It is the only high school in the Beaver Area School District. Athletic teams compete as the Beaver Bobcats in the Western Pennsylvania Interscholastic Athletic League. The school has its own choir and orchestra.

== Academics ==
According to the National Center for Education Statistics, in 2010, the school reported an enrollment of 665 pupils in grades 9th through 12th, with 85 pupils eligible for a federal free or reduced-price lunch. The school employed 33 teachers, yielding a student–teacher ratio of 20.5:1. According to a report by the Pennsylvania Department of Education, 5 teachers were rated "Non-Highly Qualified" under No Child Left Behind.

The school's eleventh grade ranked 21st out of 123 western Pennsylvania high schools for student academic achievement in 2009. The ranking was reported by the Pittsburgh Business Times. It was based on the previous three years of PSSA results on: reading, writing, math and science.

In 2010 and 2011 Beaver Area High School achieved AYP status under the federal No Child Left Behind Act.

PSSA results:
11th grade reading

- 2011 - 77% on grade level (13% below basic). State - 69.1% of 11th graders were on grade level.
- 2010 - 84% (5% below basic), state - 66%
- 2009 - 82% (3% below basic), state - 65%
- 2008 - 73%, state - 65%

11th grade math:

- 2011 - 68% on grade level (11% below basic). In Pennsylvania, 60.3% of 11th graders were on grade level.
- 2010 - 76% (12% below basic), state - 59%
- 2009 - 78% (7% below basic), state - 56%
- 2008 - 76%, state - 56%

11th grade science:

- 2011 - 58% on grade level (7% below basic). State - 40% of 11th graders were on grade level.
- 2010 - 64% (4% below basic), state - 39%
- 2009 - 61% (6% below basic), state - 40%
- 2008 - 41%, state - 39%

=== College remediation ===
According to a Pennsylvania Department of Education study released in January 2009, 43% of Beaver Area School District graduates required remediation in mathematics and/or reading before they were prepared to take college level courses in the Pennsylvania State System of Higher Education or community colleges. Less than 66% of Pennsylvania high school graduates who enroll in a four-year college in Pennsylvania will earn a bachelor's degree within six years. Among Pennsylvania high school graduates pursuing an associate degree, only one in three graduates in three years. Per the Pennsylvania Department of Education, one in three recent high school graduates who attend Pennsylvania's public universities and community colleges takes at least one remedial course in math, reading or English.

=== Dual enrollment ===
The high school does offer the Pennsylvania dual enrollment program which permits students to earn deeply discounted college credits while still enrolled in high school. The school offers credits with Carlow University, University of Pittsburgh, and Seton Hill University.

=== SAT scores ===
From January to June 2011, 118 Beaver Area School District students took the SAT exams. The district's average verbal score was 521. The average math score was 518. The average writing score was 491. Pennsylvania ranked 40th among states with SAT scores: verbal - 493, math - 501, writing - 479. In the United States 1.65 million students took the exam in 2011. They averaged 497 (out of 800) in verbal, 514 in math and 489 in writing.
