= Daugherty Township, Pennsylvania =

Township in Pennsylvania, US

Coordinates: 40°44′56″N 80°14′55″W

- Township
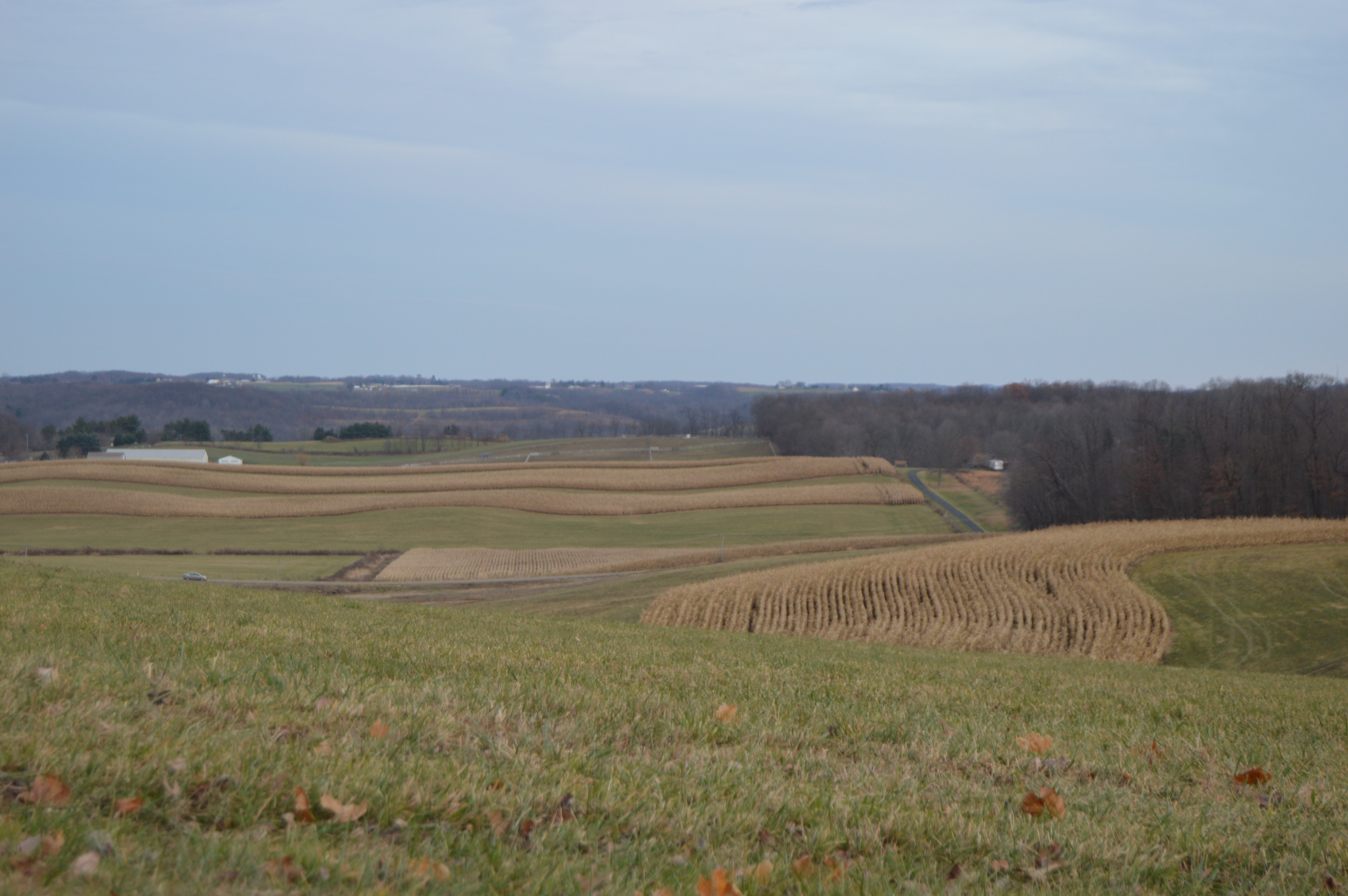
- Open land in the township's north

- Seal Logo
- Nickname: "A Miniature Americana"
- Location in Beaver County and state of Pennsylvania
- Country: United States
- State: Pennsylvania
- County: Beaver
- Settled: 1793
- Incorporated: 1894

Government
  - Type: Board of Supervisors
  - Chairman: William L. Pasquale, Jr.
  - Vice chairman: Thomas Albanese
  - Supervisor: Ivan Fabyanic
  - Secretary-Treasurer: Eric W. Bock

Area
  - Total: 9.92 sq mi (25.69 km^{2})
  - Land: 9.88 sq mi (25.60 km^{2})
  - Water: 0.035 sq mi (0.09 km^{2})

Population (2020)
  - Total: 3,078 ▼
  - Estimate (2022): 3,015
  - Density: 314.6/sq mi (121.47/km^{2})
- Time zone: UTC-5 (Eastern (EST))
  - Summer (DST): UTC-4 (EDT)
- FIPS code: 42-007-18264
- Website: www.daughertytownship-pa.gov

Daugherty Township is a township in Beaver County, Pennsylvania, United States. The population was 3,078 at the 2020 census. It is part of the Pittsburgh metropolitan area.

== Geography ==
According to the United States Census Bureau, the township has a total area of 9.9 square miles (25.7 km^{2}), of which 25.6 square kilometres (9.9 sq mi) is land and 0.04 square miles (0.1 km^{2}), or 0.35%, is water.

== Demographics ==
Historical population
| Census | Pop. | Note | %± |
|---|---|---|---|
| 1970 | 3,719 | | — |
| 1980 | 3,605 | | −3.1% |
| 1990 | 3,433 | | −4.8% |
| 2000 | 3,441 | | 0.2% |
| 2010 | 3,187 | | −7.4% |
| 2020 | 3,078 | | −3.4% |
| 2022 (est.) | 3,015 | | −2.0% |
U.S. Decennial Census

As of the 2000 census, there were 3,441 people, 1,269 households, and 994 families residing in the township. The population density was 344.9 inhabitants per square mile (133.2/km^{2}). There were 1,317 housing units at an average density of 132.0 per square mile (51.0/km^{2}). The racial makeup of the township was 97.09% White, 1.83% African American, 0.17% Native American, 0.15% Asian, 0.06% Pacific Islander, and 0.70% from two or more races. Hispanic or Latino of any race were 0.23% of the population.

There were 1,269 households, out of which 31.1% had children under the age of 18 living with them, 69.2% were married couples living together, 6.2% had a female householder with no husband present, and 21.6% were non-families. 18.8% of all households were made up of individuals, and 9.8% had someone living alone who was 65 years of age or older. The average household size was 2.62 and the average family size was 2.98.

In the township the population was spread out, with 24.1% under the age of 18, 6.7% from 18 to 24, 26.9% from 25 to 44, 26.0% from 45 to 64, and 16.4% who were 65 years of age or older. The median age was 41 years. For every 100 females there were 96.7 males. For every 100 females age 18 and over, there were 95.6 males.

The median income for a household in the township was $44,628, and the median income for a family was $49,534. Males had a median income of $33,919 versus $24,808 for females. The per capita income for the township was $17,646. About 4.4% of families and 7.4% of the population were below the poverty line, including 7.2% of those under age 18 and 3.8% of those age 65 or over.
