= Pulaski Township, Beaver County, Pennsylvania =

Township in Pennsylvania, US

Coordinates: 40°43′55″N 80°17′55″W

Pulaski Township, Pennsylvania
- Township
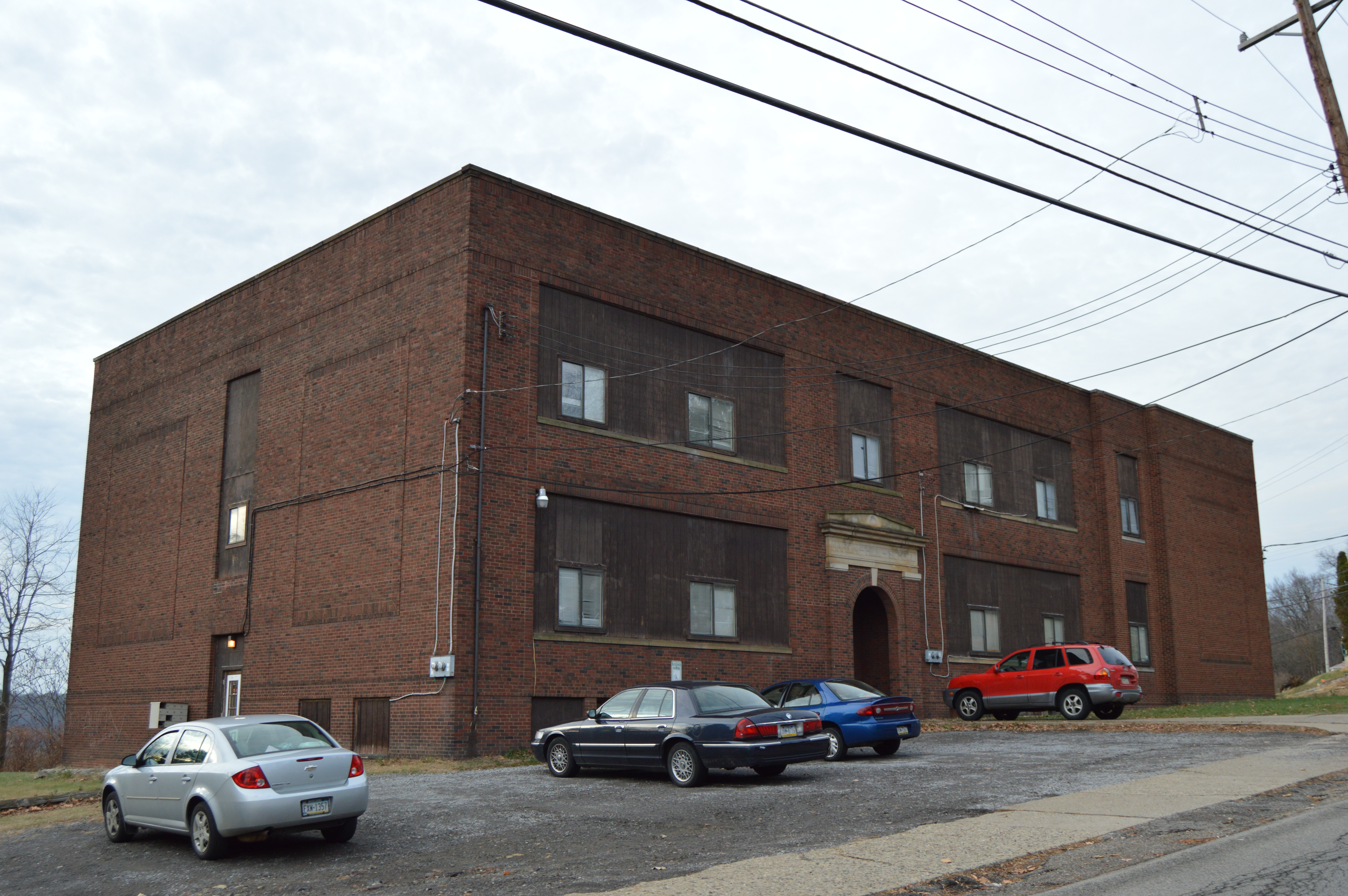
- Former Marion Hill School

- Location in Beaver County and state of Pennsylvania
- Country: United States
- State: Pennsylvania
- County: Beaver
- Incorporated: 1854

Government
  - Type: Board of Supervisors
  - Chairman: Mr. Aurthur D. Margetic
  - Vice Chairman: Mr. George Hage II
  - Supervisor: Mr. Byron Money

Area
  - Total: 0.73 sq mi (1.88 km^{2})
  - Land: 0.73 sq mi (1.88 km^{2})
  - Water: 0 sq mi (0.00 km^{2})

Population (2020)
  - Total: 1,296 ▼
  - Estimate (2021): 1,278
  - Density: 1,990.4/sq mi (768.51/km^{2})
- Time zone: UTC-5 (Eastern (EST))
  - Summer (DST): UTC-4 (EDT)
- FIPS code: 42-007-62888
- Website: www.pulaskitwpbeavercounty.org

Pulaski Township is a township in Beaver County, Pennsylvania, United States. The population was 1,296 at the 2020 census. It is part of the Pittsburgh metropolitan area.

== Geography ==
According to the United States Census Bureau, the township has a total area of 0.73 square miles (1.9 km^{2}), all land.

== Demographics ==
Historical population
Census	Pop.	Note	%±
1970	2,126		—
1980	1,998		−6.0%
1990	1,697		−15.1%
2000	1,674		−1.4%
2010	1,500		−10.4%
2020	1,296		−13.6%
2021 (est.)	1,278		−1.4%
U.S. Decennial Census

As of the 2000 census, there were 1,674 people, 726 households, and 471 families residing in the township. The population density was 2,032.0 inhabitants per square mile (784.6/km^{2}). There were 764 housing units at an average density of 927.4 per square mile (358.1/km^{2}). The racial makeup of the township was 95.40% White, 3.17% African American, 0.24% Native American, 0.18% Asian, 0.12% from other races, and 0.90% from two or more races. Hispanic or Latino of any race were 0.54% of the population.

There were 726 households, out of which 30.3% had children under the age of 18 living with them, 44.8% were married couples living together, 15.3% had a female householder with no husband present, and 35.0% were non-families. 29.8% of all households were made up of individuals, and 14.0% had someone living alone who was 65 years of age or older. The average household size was 2.31 and the average family size was 2.84.

In the township the population was spread out, with 23.2% under the age of 18, 7.5% from 18 to 24, 28.9% from 25 to 44, 24.4% from 45 to 64, and 15.9% who were 65 years of age or older. The median age was 39 years. For every 100 females there were 88.7 males. For every 100 females age 18 and over, there were 84.2 males.

The median income for a household in the township was $28,464, and the median income for a family was $33,259. Males had a median income of $28,795 versus $22,174 for females. The per capita income for the township was $14,742. About 11.5% of families and 14.1% of the population were below the poverty line, including 23.7% of those under age 18 and 11.5% of those age 65 or over.
