= National Register of Historic Places listings in Beaver County, Pennsylvania =

Location of Beaver County in Pennsylvania

This is a list of the National Register of Historic Places listings in Beaver County, Pennsylvania.

This is intended to be a complete list of the properties and districts on the National Register of Historic Places in Beaver County, Pennsylvania, United States. The locations of National Register properties and districts for which the latitude and longitude coordinates are included below, may be seen in a map.

There are 23 properties and districts listed on the National Register in the county. Three sites are further designated as National Historic Landmarks.

This National Park Service list is complete through NPS recent listings posted May 1, 2026.

== Current listings ==
	Name on the Register	Image	Date listed	Location	Municipality	Description
1	Ambridge Commercial Historic District	Ambridge Commercial Historic District	August 13, 2020 (#100005420)	Merchant St. between 3rd and 8th Sts. 40°35′12″N 80°13′38″W	Ambridge	
2	Beaver Historic District	Beaver Historic District	October 24, 1996 (#96001201)	Roughly bounded by the Cumberland and Pennsylvania Railroad tracks, Fair Avenue, 5th Street, 3rd Street, and Sassafras Lane; 40°41′41″N 80°18′27″W	Beaver	Encompasses virtually the entire community of Beaver
3	Beginning Point of the U.S. Public Land Survey	Beginning Point of the U.S. Public Land Survey	October 15, 1966 (#66000606)	On the Ohio/Pennsylvania border, east of East Liverpool; 40°38′33″N 80°31′10″W	Ohioville	Location from which most of the United States, other than the original colonies, was surveyed
4	Bridge in South Beaver Township	Bridge in South Beaver Township	June 22, 1988 (#88000868)	Watts Mill Road over the Little Beaver Creek; 40°47′26″N 80°29′38″W	Darlington and South Beaver Townships	Pratt pony truss bridge in rural northwestern Beaver County
5	Bridgewater Historic District	Bridgewater Historic District	June 28, 1996 (#96000713)	Roughly bounded by Bridge Street, Mulberry Street, Fulton Street, Cherry Alley, Elm Street, and the Beaver River; 40°42′22″N 80°17′40″W	Bridgewater and Rochester	Historic residential and commercial areas of Bridgewater, plus a bridge from Bridgewater to Rochester
6	Carnegie Free Library, Beaver Falls	Carnegie Free Library, Beaver Falls	September 5, 1985 (#85001967)	1301 7th Avenue; 40°45′10″N 80°19′10″W	Beaver Falls	Carnegie library and museum
7	James Beach Clow House	James Beach Clow House	May 17, 1989 (#89000349)	Chapel Drive at Ann Street; 40°49′33″N 80°15′32″W	North Sewickley Township	Well-preserved Greek Revival farmhouse
8	William B. Dunlap Mansion	William B. Dunlap Mansion	August 29, 1980 (#80003409)	1298 Market Street; 40°42′28″N 80°17′53″W	Bridgewater	Home of merchant and politician William B. Dunlap
9	Economy Historic District	Economy Historic District	May 21, 1985 (#85001142)	Old Economy Village roughly bounded by Pennsylvania Route 65 and 12th, Merchant, and 16th Streets; 40°35′46″N 80°13′55″W	Ambridge	Final home of the Harmony Society
10	Fort McIntosh Site	Fort McIntosh Site	April 24, 1975 (#75001614)	On a bluff overlooking the Ohio River, along River Road between College and Dravo Avenues; 40°41′27″N 80°18′15″W	Beaver	Site of a 1780s frontier fort
11	Greersburg Academy	Greersburg Academy	February 24, 1975 (#75001616)	Junction of Third and Market Streets; 40°48′36″N 80°25′25″W	Darlington	Formerly a school and currently a museum
12	Irish-Townsend House		October 25, 2024 (#100010922)	1229 7th Avenue; 40°43′54″N 80°18′27″W	New Brighton	
13	B.F. Jones Memorial Library	B.F. Jones Memorial Library	December 15, 1978 (#78002341)	663 Franklin Avenue; 40°36′47″N 80°15′05″W	Aliquippa	Built in honor of steel tycoon B.F. Jones
14	Legionville	Legionville	March 27, 1975 (#75001617)	Between the Ohio River and Duss Avenue, north of its intersection with Legionville Road and south of its intersection with Anthony Wayne Drive; 40°37′16″N 80°13′42″W	Harmony Township	First official U.S. Army training grounds
15	David Littell House	David Littell House	October 31, 1986 (#86002886)	Pennsylvania Route 18; 40°33′24″N 80°24′15″W	Hanover Township	Well-preserved 1850s brick farmhouse
16	Merrick Art Gallery	Merrick Art Gallery	August 5, 1983 (#83002215)	5th Avenue and 11th Street; 40°43′59″N 80°18′39″W	New Brighton	
17	Merrill Lock No. 6	Merrill Lock No. 6	September 4, 1980 (#80003410)	East of Midland on Pennsylvania Route 68; 40°40′07″N 80°21′06″W	Industry	Buildings associated with a lock and dam complex on the Ohio River
18	Old Economy	Old Economy	October 15, 1966 (#66000644)	Northeast of Pittsburgh on Pennsylvania Route 65; 40°35′46″N 80°13′59″W	Ambridge	Final home of the Harmony Society
19	Pittsburgh and Lake Erie Passenger Station, Aliquippa	Pittsburgh and Lake Erie Passenger Station, Aliquippa	April 26, 1990 (#90000700)	111 Station Street; 40°37′10″N 80°14′35″W	Aliquippa	Former railroad station and office building
20	Matthew S. Quay House	Matthew S. Quay House	May 15, 1975 (#75001615)	205 College Avenue; 40°41′37″N 80°18′15″W	Beaver	Home of Matthew S. Quay, a powerful U.S. senator
21	Raccoon Creek RDA	Raccoon Creek RDA	May 18, 1987 (#87000745)	Along Pennsylvania Route 18 in Raccoon Creek State Park; 40°30′42″N 80°26′34″W	Hanover Township	Recreational Demonstration Area constructed during the Great Depression
22	United Steelworkers Local #1211 Union Hall		April 12, 2021 (#100006368)	501 Franklin Ave. 40°36′55″N 80°14′55″W	Aliquippa	
23	Capt. William Vicary House	Capt. William Vicary House	November 8, 1974 (#74001749)	1235 3rd Ave. 40°40′55″N 80°15′00″W	Freedom	Early nineteenth-century stone mansion

== See also ==
- List of Pennsylvania state historical markers in Beaver County
