= Blackhawk School District =

School district in Pennsylvania

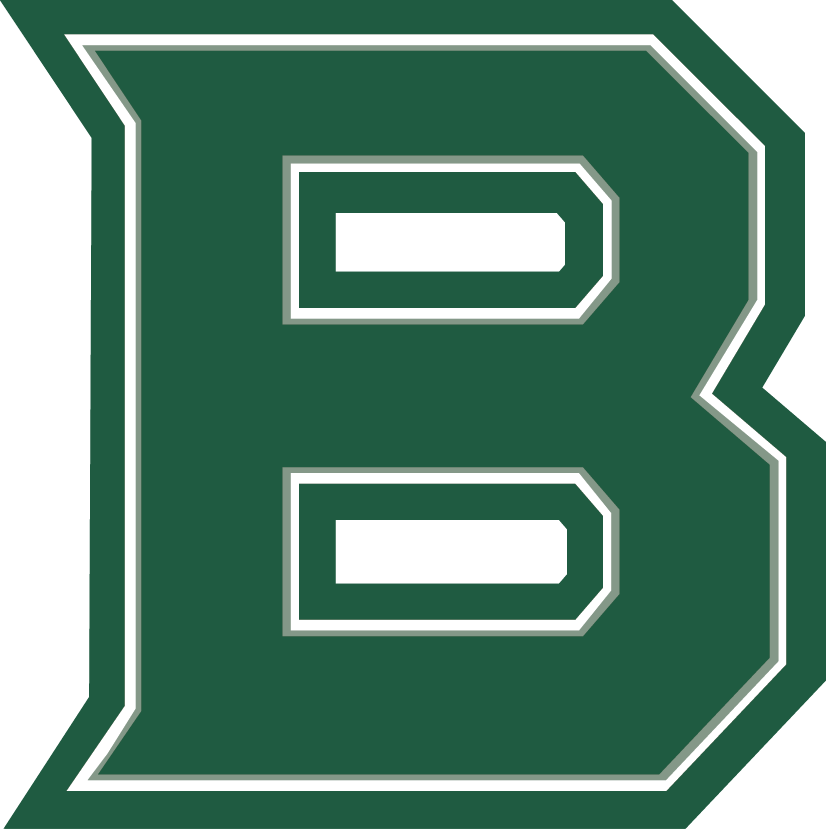

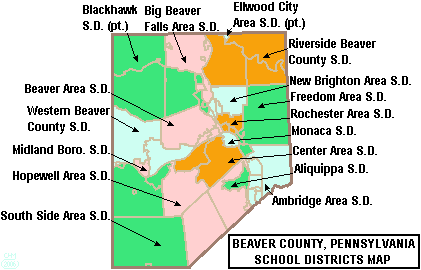

Address
- 500 Blackhawk Road Beaver Falls, Pennsylvania, 15010; United States
- Coordinates: 40.765012°N 80.401799°W

District information
- Type: Public

Students and staff
- District mascot: Cougar
- Colors: Green; Gold

Other information
- Website: www.bsd.k12.pa.us

The Blackhawk School District is a tiny, rural public school district that spans portions of two counties in Pennsylvania, United States. Blackhawk School District encompasses approximately 69 square miles (180 km^{2}). In Beaver County it covers the boroughs of Darlington, Patterson Heights and West Mayfield and Chippewa Township, Darlington Township, Patterson Township and South Beaver Township. In Lawrence County it covers the borough of Enon Valley. According to the 2000 federal census, it serves a resident population of 17,322. By 2010, the district's population increased to 17,765. 93.6% of Blackhawk School District's residents (25 years old and over) were high school graduates and 24.1% were college graduates. It is one of the 500 public school districts of Pennsylvania.

According to the Pennsylvania Budget and Policy Center, 27.123% of the district’s pupils lived at 185% or below the Federal Poverty Level as shown by their eligibility for federal free or reduced price school meal programs in 2012. In 2013 the Pennsylvania Department of Education reported that 15 students in the Blackhawk School District were homeless. In 2009, the district residents' per capita income was $21,310, while the median family income was $52,242. In the Commonwealth, the median family income was $49,501 The United States median family income was $49,445 in 2010. In Beaver County, the median household income was $49,217. By 2013, the median household income in the United States rose to $52,100. In 2014, the median household income in the US was $53,700.

Blackhawk School District operates Blackhawk High School (grades 9-12), Highland Middle School (5-8), Blackhawk Intermediate School (3-4), and Patterson Primary School (K-2). The district also offers a free, taxpayer-funded preschool for four-year-olds at the Intermediate School. The Northwestern Primary School was used up until 2018 due to damage to the building. The school was sold in 2021. Also, the High school students may choose to attend Beaver County Career and Technology Career for training in the construction and mechanical trades. The Beaver Valley Intermediate Unit IU27 provides the district with a wide variety of services like specialized education for disabled students and hearing, speech and visual disability services and professional development for staff and faculty.

== Extracurriculars ==
Blackhawk School District offers a wide variety of clubs, activities and an extensive sports program.

The Blackhawk High School Music Academy is a program open to students in grades 9 through 12 in Beaver County. The music program focuses on performance as well as music theory, technology and history. It provides voice and instrument instruction.

=== Sports ===
The district funds (as of 2015):

Varsity

Boys

- Baseball – AAAA
- Basketball- AAAA
- Cross country – AA
- Football – AAAA
- Golf – AAA
- Soccer – AA
- Swimming and diving – AA
- Tennis – AA
- Track and field – AAA
- Wrestling – AA

Girls

- Basketball – AAAA
- Cross country – AA
- Golf – AAA
- Lacrosse – AA
- Soccer (fall) – AA
- Softball – AAA
- Swimming and diving – AA
- Tennis – AA
- Track and field – AAA
- Volleyball – AA

Middle school sports

Boys

- Basketball
- Cross country
- Football
- Soccer
- Swimming and diving
- Track and field
- Wrestling

Girls

- Basketball
- Cross country
- Soccer
- Softball
- Swimming and diving
- Track and field
- Volleyball
