= West Mayfield, Pennsylvania =

Borough in Pennsylvania, US

- Borough
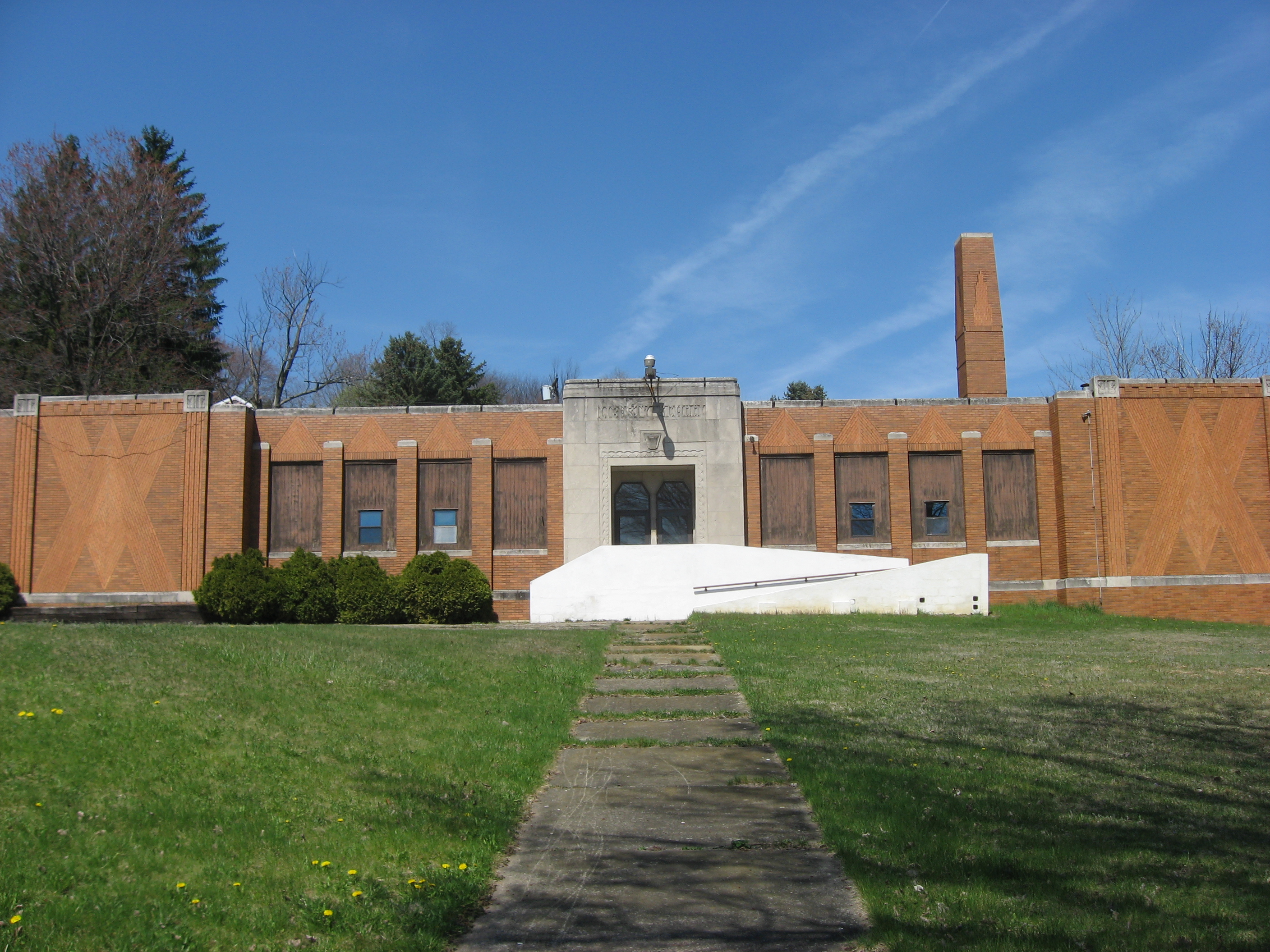
- Former school in central West Mayfield
- Motto: "A Nice Place to Live"
- Interactive map of West Mayfield, Pennsylvania
- Location within Pennsylvania Location within the United States
- Coordinates: 40°46′43″N 80°20′12″W
- Country: United States
- State: Pennsylvania
- County: Beaver
- Incorporated: 1923

Government
  - Type: Borough Council

Area
  - Total: 0.80 sq mi (2.06 km^{2})
  - Land: 0.80 sq mi (2.06 km^{2})
  - Water: 0 sq mi (0.00 km^{2})
- Elevation: 1,017 ft (310 m)

Population (2020)
  - Total: 1,195
  - Density: 1,503.2/sq mi (580.37/km^{2})
- Time zone: UTC-5 (Eastern (EST))
  - Summer (DST): UTC-4 (EDT)
- ZIP code: 15010
- Area code: 724
- FIPS code: 42-83472
- Website: www.westmayfieldborough.us

West Mayfield is a borough in northern Beaver County, Pennsylvania, United States. The population was 1,195 at the 2020 census. It is a part of the Pittsburgh metropolitan area.

== History ==
The authoritative written history of West Mayfield comes from Edith Porter's "West Mayfield History", reprinted here from Milestones, Vol. 27, No. 1, Winter 2002.

At the founding of Beaver County, the Borough of West Mayfleld was part of South Beaver Township. In 1816, it came within Chippewa's bounds upon founding of that township. In 1887, the land passed into the newly formed White Township. Around this time, the site known as Mayfield was little more than a station on the Pennsylvania Railroad. The station stop took its name from a farm up on the hill known as Mayfield Cottage. West Mayfield, then, was the area west of the station stop. It had areas too. The Oakville area centered around the present Rock Avenue just southwest of 37th Street. Another section was known as West Park. These names survive in the vicinity today in the name for a school, West Park; the name of a part of Route 251, Oakville Road; and the name of the community, West Mayfield. Its increasing industrialization and the need for more and better schools led to the split from White Township and its incorporation in 1923.

Most of West Mayfield lies along the north and south of a long, steep hill called 37th Street, part of Route 251. To the south is a hollow which was once part of the Harbison farm and coal yards. Before the industries began, there were only the farmlands of the Whites, Edwards, Harbisons, Ridings, Waggoners and Schuttes, about a dozen houses and a little schoolhouse. Thirty-seventh Street was a narrow dirt road traveled by a few buggies and wagons in the summer and in the winter by a similar number of sleds and sleighs. When it snowed, the young people of College Hill and Geneva College had bobsled parties on the road.

Most of the names we have found among the early settlers were English. John White, credited with being the first settler, came to this area about 1792-93 under the "Settlement and Improvement Act of 1792". He came from County Antrim, Ireland. John Edwards appears to have bought land from John White on 37th Street hill, now part of West Mayfield. He was born in Wales and came to this area sometime after 1852. Other prominent names in West Mayfleld which appear to be English, Irish or Scotch are Scranton, Patterson, Portman, Calhoun, Ridings, Garvin, and Goe, Schutte and Gumph are evidently German names. Rouzer, Keller, Ohnsman, Smith, McConnels, Patterson and Ridings were instrumental in forming the charter for the township as it broke away from White Township.

The Edwards School, a one-room red brick structure, was built about 1880 on land donated by the Edwards family. John Edwards had come to Pittsburgh from Wales when he was a young boy. He worked on the canal along the Beaver River. He worked in the gold fields of California for a year and returned to buy a farm on 37th Street hill. The Edwards School building also served as a community meeting house and as an auditorium for lectures and other programs. At the end of each school year it hosted the annual picnic for the school children and their families. The Edwards home was a welcome stop for sledders to share warmth, refreshments and hospitality. The information seems to indicate that the Edwards School had replaced the White Schoolhouse since it was, in the 1880s, "the only school for miles around." It served the area for many years. A News-Tribune article of August 30, 1924, announced that forty pupils were expected to take up their studies in the Edwards School under Miss Leiper on September 2, the opening day of school. The school administration was still under White Township, even though they had split away the previous year, according to the News-Tribune item. That year, 1924, the three teachers at the West Park building were Mr. Balph, and the Misses Anna Birnnisser and Florence Garvin, with the enrollment expected to be between 105 and 110.

The West Park building was begun in 1919 with four classrooms. A News-Tribune article of December 23, 1930, announced the laying of the cornerstone for the new West Mayfield School (to be named Liberty School). It would house grades 1–3, and West Park School grades 4–6. It is presumed that the Edwards School continued in use as a Community Building for a time, since the Volunteer Fire Department used it as a meeting place until they were able to use the borough building. A two-story and partial basement addition to the West Park School was completed in 1959. Ten years later, in the fall of 1969, a one-story addition was occupied, and the Liberty School was no longer required for classrooms. It has become the West Mayfield Municipal Building. The enrollment at West Park has declined from a projected 255, in the Long Range Developmental Program of the Blackhawk District, (1970), to about 155 for the 1980–81 school year. Previously, secondary education was available in the Beaver Falls schools; when the borough became a part of the Highland jointure, students could attend the Highland Junior High and Northwestern High School, or they could choose to go to Beaver Falls. Since the borough is now a part of Blackhawk School District, students continue in Middle School at Highland and attend the four-year Blackhawk High School on Blackhawk Road.

St. Philomena Catholic Church serves the West Mayfield community, though it is located just outside the borough boundaries. It has a parish school, begun in 1958. One grade was added each year until eight grades were provided in September 1964. Present enrollment is about 130, and many of the students come from the community of West Mayrfield.

A Christian School was established in West Mayfield in 1978. It has grades K–12 and an enrollment of about 60. It is housed in the West Mayfield Community Church, now listed in the phone book as the West Mayfleld Bible Baptist Church. The congregation began from the need for Christian teaching for children in the West Mayfield Housing Project in 1948. From a group of children in Sunday School classes in the community building of the project, the attendance grew, and a congregation formed which was known as the West Mayfleld Reformed Presbyterian Mission. They separated from the affiliation with the Reformed Presbyterian denomination and were chartered in 1962 as the West Mayfleld Community Church. They began their building in 1967 on property located on lower High Street.

The Church of the Living Christ is located on Rock Avenue near 37th Street. It is a small chapel, built here in 1910, in the Oakville area, to conduct a Mission Sabbath school. A permanent Christian Association, under the College Hill Reformed Church, was formed for this congregation. It continued until about fifteen years ago when Ken Engle purchased the building from the College Hill Reformed Church for the purpose of holding Boy Scout meetings. It served the Boy Scouts for ten years until the present congregation purchased the chapel from Mr. Engle. They have held services here for the past five years.

Early industries in the area included a scale works and a key works, and coal was mined in Harbison Hollow. Large scale industrial development began in 1899 with the move into the present West Mayfield of a tube making industry, now Babcock & Wilcox Company, Tubular Products Division. Other manufacturers followed; present ones include Mayfleld Foundry, maker of castings for the local mills and manufacturer of heritage articles of early American Colonial days, and Standard Steel Specialty Company, maker of elevator guides and other products.

As the new tube mill was built, there was a need for homes and workmen and their families, so the farms gradually became subdivisions. As the plant expanded, more and more homes were needed. It is a fairly densely populated area, as contrasted with Chippewa, Darlington, or South Beaver townships. West Mayfield probably has more families of different ethnic backgrounds than any other areas as well. As industrial needs increased, people from many walks of life sought employment in the borough. It had the highest proportion of rentals in the Blackhawk District in 1970, but with the increasing number of apartments in both Chippewa and Patterson and the increase in new homes built in West Mayfield, the percentage has probably changed in the past ten years. The area is .66 square miles, and it has a population of about 2,200.

West Mayfield is fairly close-knit, in terms of community spirit. They have an active Volunteer Fire Department, and the school has enjoyed the support of a fine Parent-Teacher Organization. The P.T.O. has contributed much to the library, school equipment and furnishings, school programs and activities, including field trips. Most of the youngsters participate in various Little League ball clubs with much support from the community. The "Hollow" is West Mayfleld's main recreational facility. It is the community park in Harbison Hollow. An extensive flat area features three ball fields, basketball and tennis courts, picnic shelters and playground equipment. It is the site of the annual school picnic. Teachers and children walk to the park. Bordered by the wooded hillsides, it is reminiscent of the way it might have been at the Edwards School a hundred years ago.

== Geography ==
West Mayfield is located in north-central Beaver County at 40°46′43″N 80°20′12″W (40.778664, −80.336796). According to the United States Census Bureau, the borough has a total area of 0.8 square miles (2.1 km^{2}), all land.

West Mayfield is home to a picturesque community park containing a meandering stream called Walnut Bottom Run, which eventually empties into the Beaver River.

=== Surrounding neighborhoods ===
West Mayfield has four borders, including Big Beaver to the north, Beaver Falls to the east, White Township to the south, and Chippewa Township to the west.

== Demographics ==
Historical population
Census	Pop.	Note	%±
1930	876		—
1940	963		9.9%
1950	1,768		83.6%
1960	2,201		24.5%
1970	2,152		−2.2%
1980	1,712		−20.4%
1990	1,312		−23.4%
2000	1,187		−9.5%
2010	1,239		4.4%
2020	1,195		−3.6%
2021 (est.)	1,181	▼	−1.2%
U.S. Decennial Census

As of the 2000 census, there were 1,187 people, 469 households, and 334 families residing in the borough. The population density was 1,514.8 inhabitants per square mile (584.9/km^{2}). There were 499 housing units at an average density of 636.8 per square mile (245.9/km^{2}). The racial makeup of the borough was 97.14% White, 2.02% African American, 0.08% Native American, 0.08% Asian, 0.42% from other races, and 0.25% from two or more races. Hispanic or Latino of any race were 0.42% of the population.

There were 469 households, out of which 30.7% had children under the age of 18 living with them, 55.9% were married couples living together, 10.7% had a female householder with no husband present, and 28.6% were non-families. 24.1% of all households were made up of individuals, and 13.0% had someone living alone who was 65 years of age or older. The average household size was 2.51 and the average family size was 2.96.

In the borough the population was spread out, with 24.7% under the age of 18, 6.4% from 18 to 24, 27.7% from 25 to 44, 21.9% from 45 to 64, and 19.3% who were 65 years of age or older. The median age was 40 years. For every 100 females there were 87.2 males. For every 100 females age 18 and over, there were 83.6 males.

The median income for a household in the borough was $36,324, and the median income for a family was $41,645. Males had a median income of $32,292 versus $23,125 for females. The per capita income for the borough was $17,609. About 5.8% of families and 10.3% of the population were below the poverty line, including 16.0% of those under age 18 and 2.9% of those age 65 or over.

== Education ==
Children in West Mayfield are served by the Blackhawk School District. The current schools serving West Mayfield are:

- Patterson Primary School – grades K–2
- Blackhawk Intermediate School – grades 3–5
- Highland Middle School – grades 6–8
- Blackhawk High School – grades 9–12
