= Dante Calabria =

Italian-American basketball player and coach

Pistoia Basket 2000
- Title: Head coach
- League: LBA

Personal information
- Born: November 8, 1973 (age 53) Pottstown, Pennsylvania, U.S.
- Listed height: 6 ft 5 in (1.96 m)
- Listed weight: 175 lb (79 kg)

Career information
- High school: Blackhawk (Chippewa, Pennsylvania)
- College: North Carolina (1992–1996)
- NBA draft: 1996: undrafted
- Playing career: 1996–2010
- Position: Shooting guard
- Coaching career: 2012–present

Career history

Playing
- 1996–1997: Bini Viaggi Livorno
- 1997–1998: Fort Wayne Fury
- 1998–1999: JDA Dijon
- 1999: Pau Orthez
- 2000: Aris B.C.
- 2000–2001: Telit Trieste
- 2001–2002: Pamesa Valencia
- 2002–2003: Benetton Treviso
- 2003–2004: Oregon Scientific Cantú
- 2004–2007: Armani Jeans Milano
- 2007–2008: Upim Bologna
- 2008–2009: Triboldi Soresina
- 2010: Igea Sant'Antimo

Coaching
- 2011–2013: UNC Wilmington (assistant)
- 2014–2015: Montverde Academy
- 2015: Basket Taranto
- 2016–2017: Keiser (assistant)
- 2017–2018: Keiser
- 2018–2019: Auxilium Torino (assistant)
- 2019–2021: Barry (assistant)
- 2022–2024: Bethel Park HS
- 2024–present: Pistoia Basket 2000

Career highlights
- NCAA champion (1993); Third-team All-ACC (1996)

Dante John Calabria (born November 8, 1973) is an Italian-American former professional basketball player and coach. He is currently the head coach of Pistoia Basket 2000 of the Lega Basket Serie A (LBA).

== College career ==
Calabria played college basketball at North Carolina under coach Dean Smith from 1992 to 1996. He was a member of the Tar Heels’ 1993 national championship team.

== Professional career ==
He moved to Europe for his professional career, spending a good part of it in the Italian Serie A.

== International career ==
A dual national of United States and Italy, he played for the Italy national basketball team.

== Coaching career ==
In 2011, Calabria was named director of basketball operations at UNC Wilmington under coach Buzz Peterson. In 2012, he was moved to a full assistant role with the departure of Brooks Lee. Calabria then had coaching stints at Montverde Academy in Florida and at Basket Taranto in Italy, before joining NAIA school Keiser University as an assistant coach under Rollie Massimino. After Massimino's death, Calabria was named Keiser's Interim Head Coach in September 2017, with the Interim tag being removed in January 2018.

In June 2018, Calabria became an assistant coach of Larry Brown for the Italian basketball club Auxilium Torino. Calabria spent two seasons as an assistant coach at Barry University in Florida. He resigned in September 2021. On May 25, 2022, he was named the head basketball coach of Bethel Park High School in Bethel Park, Pennsylvania.

On July 17, 2024, he signed with Pistoia Basket 2000 of the Lega Basket Serie A (LBA).
