= Senator Dunlap =

Senator Dunlap may refer to:

- Henry M. Dunlap (1853–1938), Illinois State Senate
- Jim Dunlap (born 1961), Oklahoma State Senate
- John F. Dunlap (1922–2022), California State Senate
- Renick William Dunlap (1872–1945), Ohio State Senate
- Robert P. Dunlap (1794–1859), Maine State Senate
- William B. Dunlap (fl. 1870s–1890s), Pennsylvania State Senate
- William Claiborne Dunlap (1798–1872), Tennessee State Senate
