= William Dunlap (disambiguation) =

William Dunlap (1766–1839) was a pioneer of American theater.

William Dunlap may also refer to:

- William Dunlap Simpson (1823–1890), Governor of South Carolina
- William Claiborne Dunlap (1798–1872), U.S. Representative from Tennessee
- William R. Dunlap (born 1944), American artist, arts commentator and educator
- William B. Dunlap (fl. 1870s–1890s), former Democratic member of the Pennsylvania State Senate
- Bill Dunlap (William James Dunlap, 1909–1980), Major League Baseball player

== See also ==
- Bill Dunlop (born 1963), Canadian boxer
