= Patterson Heights, Pennsylvania =

Borough in Pennsylvania, US

- Borough
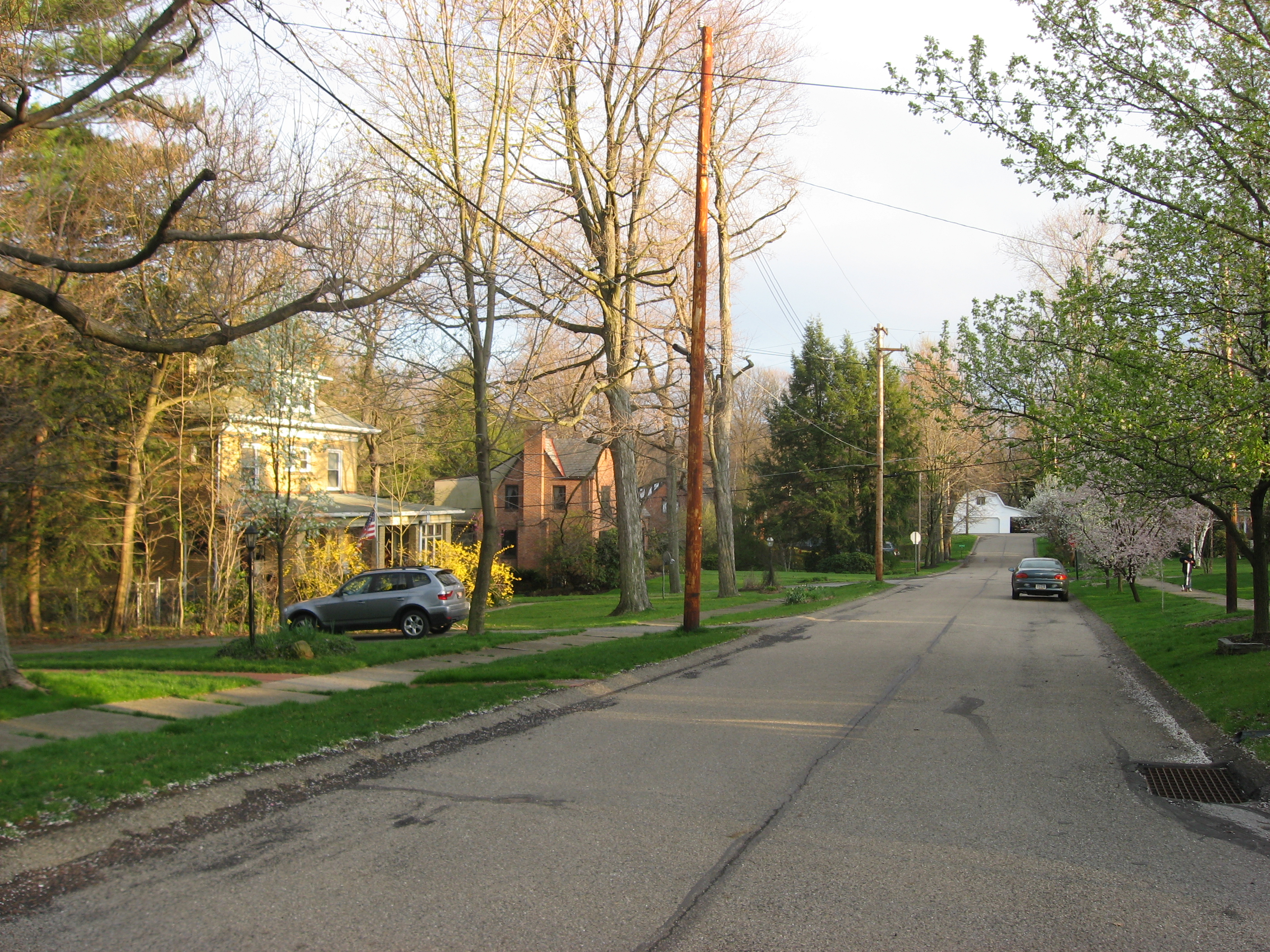
- Fourth avenue located on the west side of Patterson Heights
- Interactive map of Patterson Heights, Pennsylvania
- Location within Pennsylvania Location within the United States
- Coordinates: 40°44′21″N 80°19′41″W
- Country: United States
- State: Pennsylvania
- County: Beaver
- Settled: 1895
- Incorporated: 1899

Government
  - Type: Borough Council
  - Mayor: Bard Hendry
  - Fire Chief: Jason Medlin

Area
  - Total: 0.23 sq mi (0.60 km^{2})
  - Land: 0.22 sq mi (0.58 km^{2})
  - Water: 0.0039 sq mi (0.01 km^{2})
- Elevation: 1,053 ft (321 m)

Population (2020)
  - Total: 589
  - Density: 2,834/sq mi (1,094.2/km^{2})
- Time zone: UTC-5 (Eastern (EST))
  - Summer (DST): UTC-4 (EDT)
- ZIP code: 15010
- Area code: 724
- FIPS code: 42-58384
- Website: patterson-hgts.com

Patterson Heights is a borough in north-central Beaver County, Pennsylvania, United States. The population was 639 at the 2020 census. It is a part of the Pittsburgh metropolitan area.

== History ==
In 1899, a petition was signed by residents of Patterson Heights to incorporate the borough into the larger Patterson Township. In 1895, the Patterson Heights Railway Company opened the Patterson Heights Incline, which ran successfully until 1927, when automobiles began to increase in popularity. In 1919, the Patterson Heights Airport was built on Fallston Hill, making it the first airport located in Beaver County, which lasted until 1957, when the Beaver Valley Golf Club wanted to expand its golf course.

== Geography ==
Patterson Heights is located in north-central Beaver County at 40°44′21″N 80°19′41″W (40.739029, −80.328050). According to the United States Census Bureau, Patterson Heights has a total area of 0.23 square miles (0.6 km^{2}), of which 0.004 square miles (0.01 km^{2}), or 2.46%, is water.

=== Surrounding and adjacent neighborhoods ===
Patterson Heights has two land borders, including Beaver Falls to the northeast and Patterson Township to the south, west and northwest. Across the Beaver River to the east, Patterson Heights run adjacent with New Brighton.

== Demographics ==
Historical population
Census	Pop.	Note	%±
1900	272		—
1910	367		34.9%
1920	459		25.1%
1930	639		39.2%
1940	657		2.8%
1950	678		3.2%
1960	816		20.4%
1970	777		−4.8%
1980	797		2.6%
1990	576		−27.7%
2000	670		16.3%
2010	636		−5.1%
2020	639		0.5%
2021 (est.)	629	▼	−1.6%

As of the 2000 census, there were 670 people, 256 households, and 199 families residing in the borough. The population density was 2,757.4 inhabitants per square mile (1,064.6/km^{2}). There were 268 housing units at an average density of 1,103.0 per square mile (425.9/km^{2}). The racial makeup of the borough was 96.57% White, 0.30% African American, 0.45% Asian, 1.04% from other races, and 1.64% from two or more races. Hispanic or Latino of any race were 1.34% of the population.

There were 256 households, out of which 29.7% had children under the age of 18 living with them, 69.1% were married couples living together, 6.3% had a female householder with no husband present, and 21.9% were non-families. 19.9% of all households were made up of individuals, and 9.4% had someone living alone who was 65 years of age or older. The average household size was 2.62 and the average family size was 3.02.

In the borough the population was spread out, with 25.7% under the age of 18, 4.5% from 18 to 24, 23.4% from 25 to 44, 26.6% from 45 to 64, and 19.9% who were 65 years of age or older. The median age was 43 years. For every 100 females, there were 91.4 males. For every 100 females age 18 and over, there were 87.9 males.

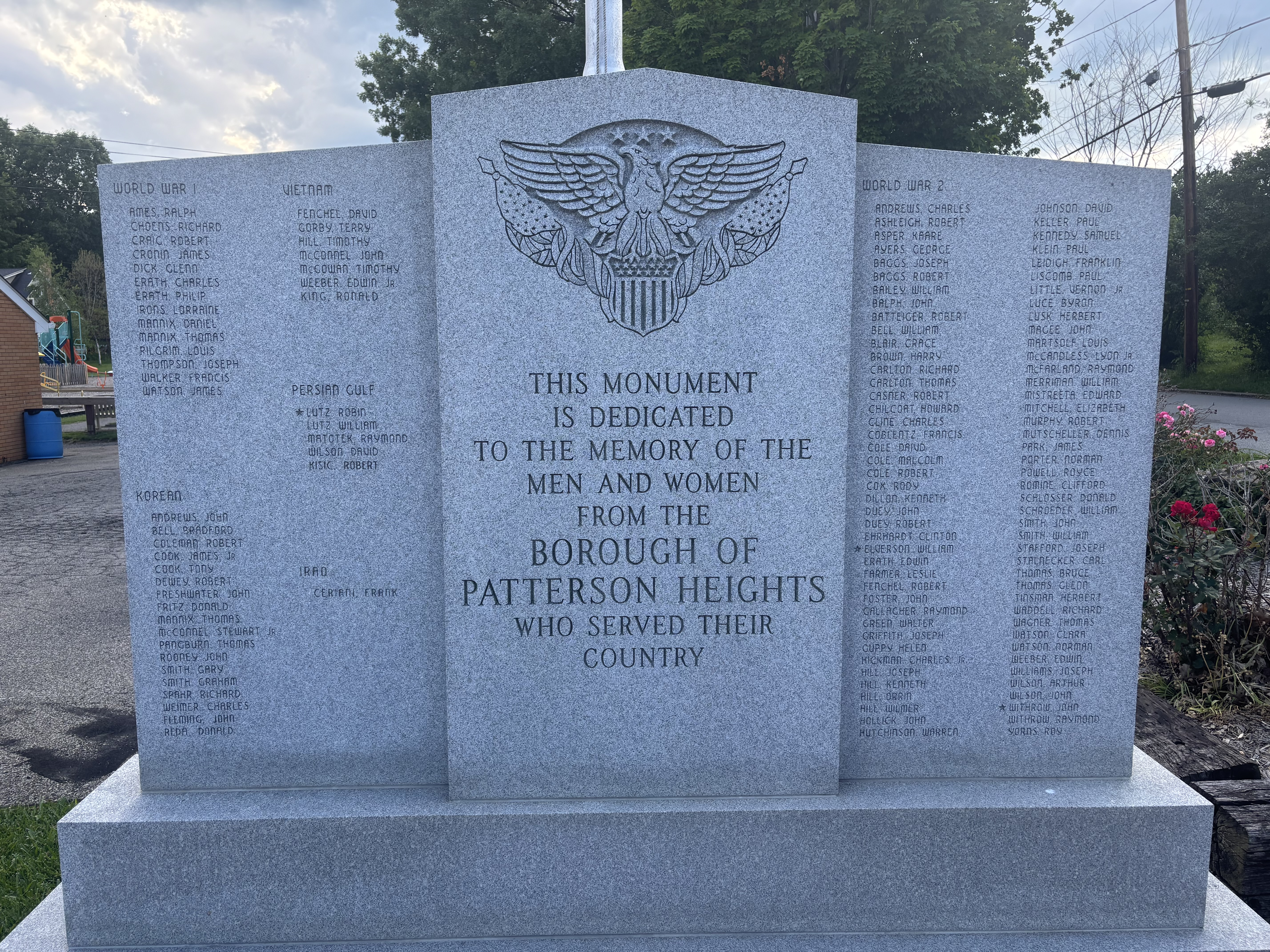
Cenotaph located at the borough building

The median income for a household in the borough was $49,917, and the median income for a family was $52,411. Males had a median income of $39,250 versus $31,771 for females. The per capita income for the borough was $21,244. About 7.7% of families and 6.6% of the population were below the poverty line, including 6.6% of those under age 18 and 9.2% of those age 65 or over.

== Education ==
Children in Patterson Heights are served by the Blackhawk School District. The current schools serving Patterson Heights are:

- Patterson Primary School – grades K–2
- Blackhawk Intermediate School – grades 3–5
- Highland Middle School – grades 6–8
- Blackhawk High School – grades 9–12

== Public services ==
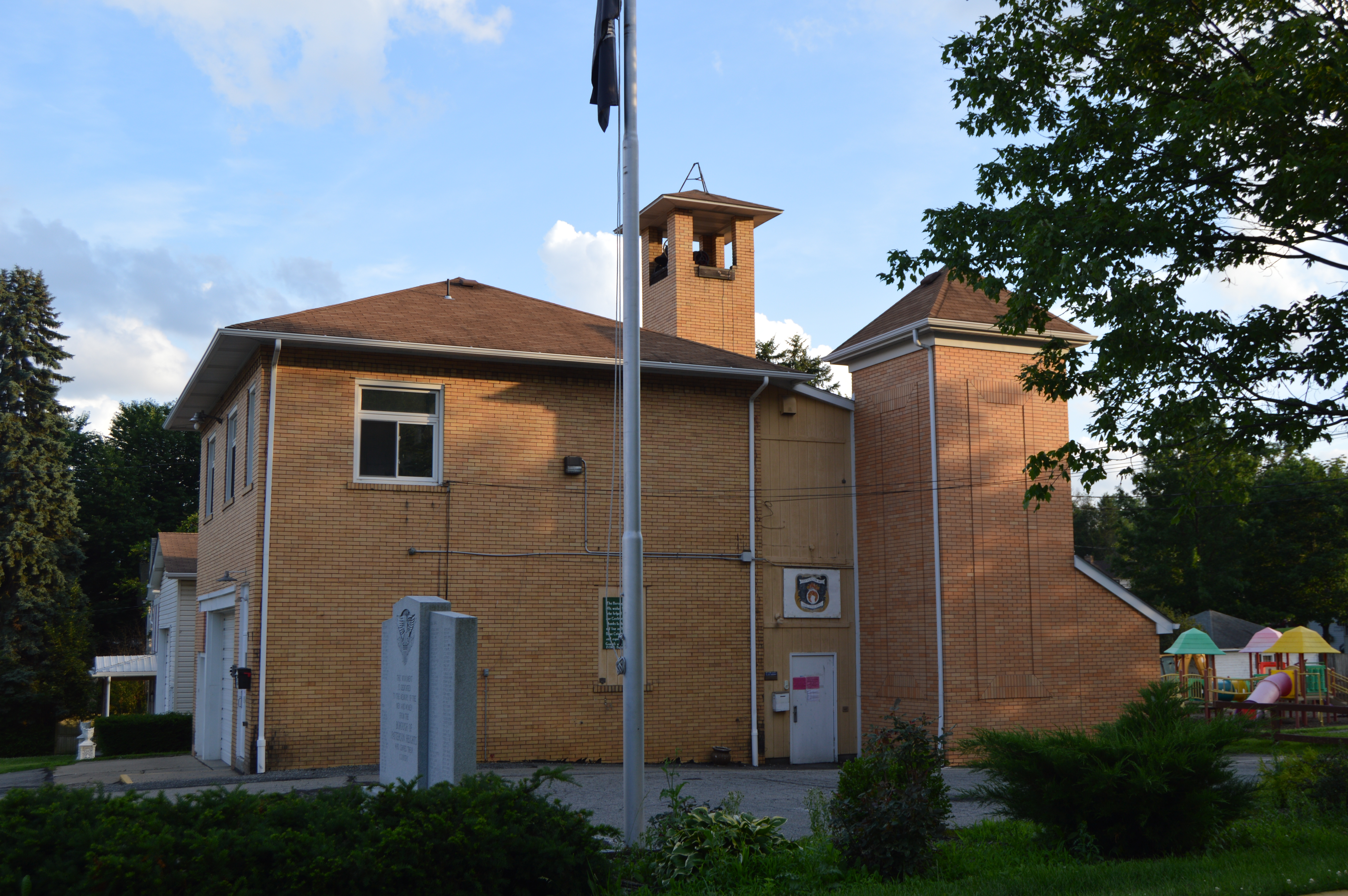
Borough building

Patterson Heights has a small volunteer fire department consisting of roughly 25 members. The Patterson Heights Volunteer Fire Department was incorporated November 4, 1903, making it Beaver County's first incorporated fire department. Patterson Heights does not have a police department. Police protection is contracted to the Patterson Township Police Department.
