= Watts Mill Bridge =

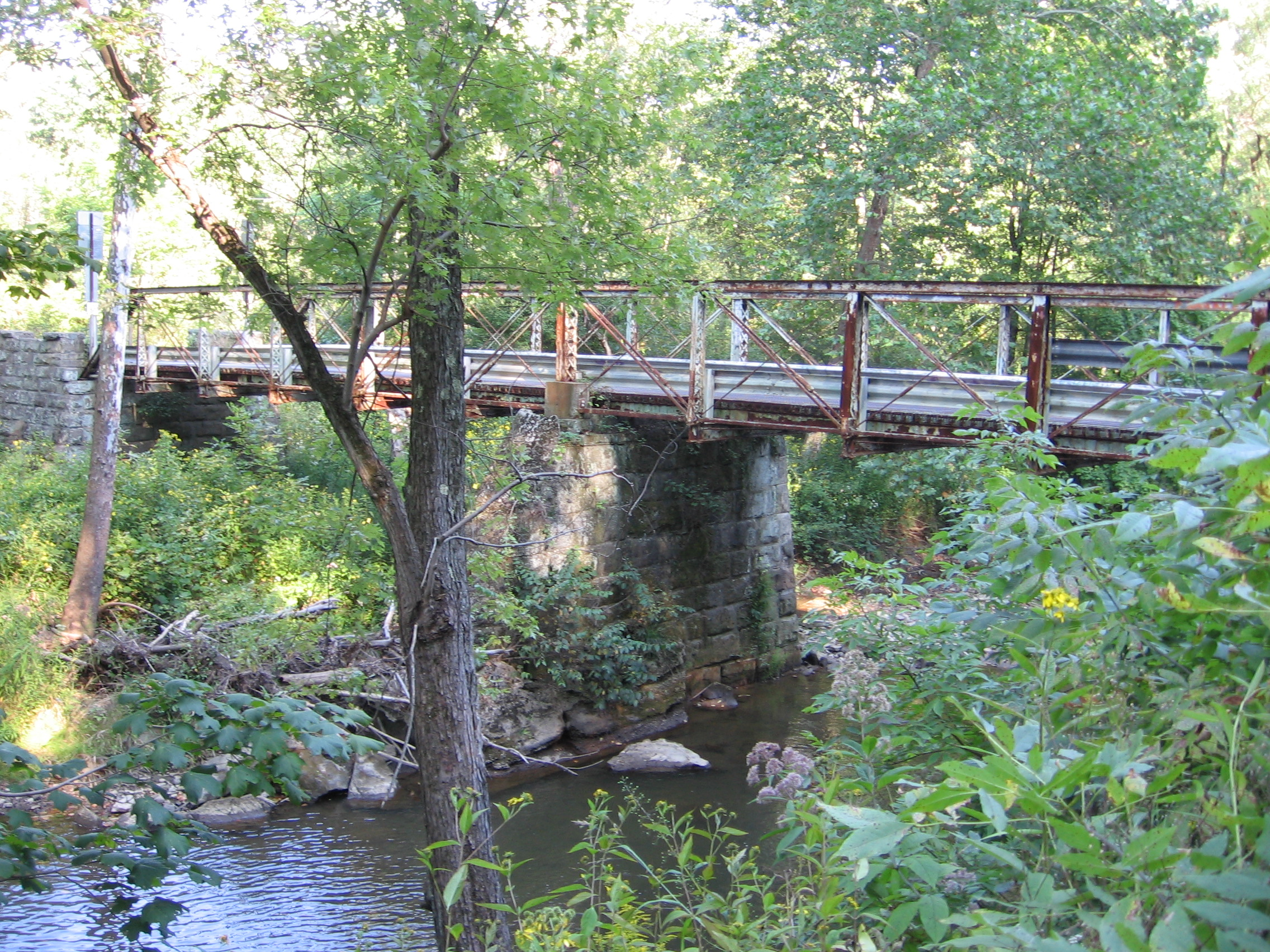
- Watts Mill Bridge in September 2008
- Coordinates: 40°47′26″N 80°29′38″W
- Carries: Watts Mill Road
- Crosses: Little Beaver Creek
- Locale: Beaver, Pennsylvania, United States
- Other name: Bridge in South Beaver Township
- Maintained by: PennDOT
- NBI Number: 044009006000000

Characteristics
- Total length: 109 ft (33 m)
- Width: 12.5 ft (3.8 m)
- Load limit: 14.5 t (16.0 short tons)

History
- Constructed by: West Penn Bridge Company
- Built: 1878
- Bridge in South Beaver Township
- U.S. National Register of Historic Places
- Area: less than one acre
- Architect: West Penn Bridge Co.
- MPS: Highway Bridges Owned by the Commonwealth of Pennsylvania, Department of Transportation TR
- NRHP reference No.: 88000868
- Added to NRHP: June 22, 1988

Location
- Interactive map of Watts Mill Bridge

The Watts Mill Bridge is a pin-connected Pratt pony truss bridge located over the Little Beaver Creek in Cannelton, Pennsylvania, United States.

The bridge was constructed in 1878 by the West Penn Bridge Company, based in nearby Beaver Falls PA. The bridge is located in a valley approximately a 1/8 mile west of the North Country National Scenic Trail. The bridge and adjacent Mill remains were listed on the National Register of Historic Places in 1988. When the bridge was given this designation by the NRHP, it was simply known as the Bridge in South Beaver Township. It is the only bridge in Beaver County on the National Register for itself, although the Bridgewater-Rochester Bridge over the Beaver River is part of the Bridgewater Historic District in Bridgewater to the south.

In 2004, the bridge, which was becoming rusty and falling into disrepair and considered for demolition by PennDOT, was placed on the Top Ten Best Historic Preservation Opportunities in the Pittsburgh Area by the Young Preservationists Association of Pittsburgh.

The bridge was removed in 2019 in cooperation with a partnership with Workin' Bridges to rehabilitate the bridge for pedestrian only usage and be able to have continued access to historical and recreational opportunities in the immediate area. The refurbished pedestrian bridge was returned in March, 2023.

== See also ==
- List of bridges on the National Register of Historic Places in Pennsylvania
- National Register of Historic Places listings in Beaver County, Pennsylvania
