= White Township, Beaver County, Pennsylvania =

Township in Pennsylvania, US

Coordinates: 40°45′57″N 80°20′07″W

White Township, Pennsylvania
- Township
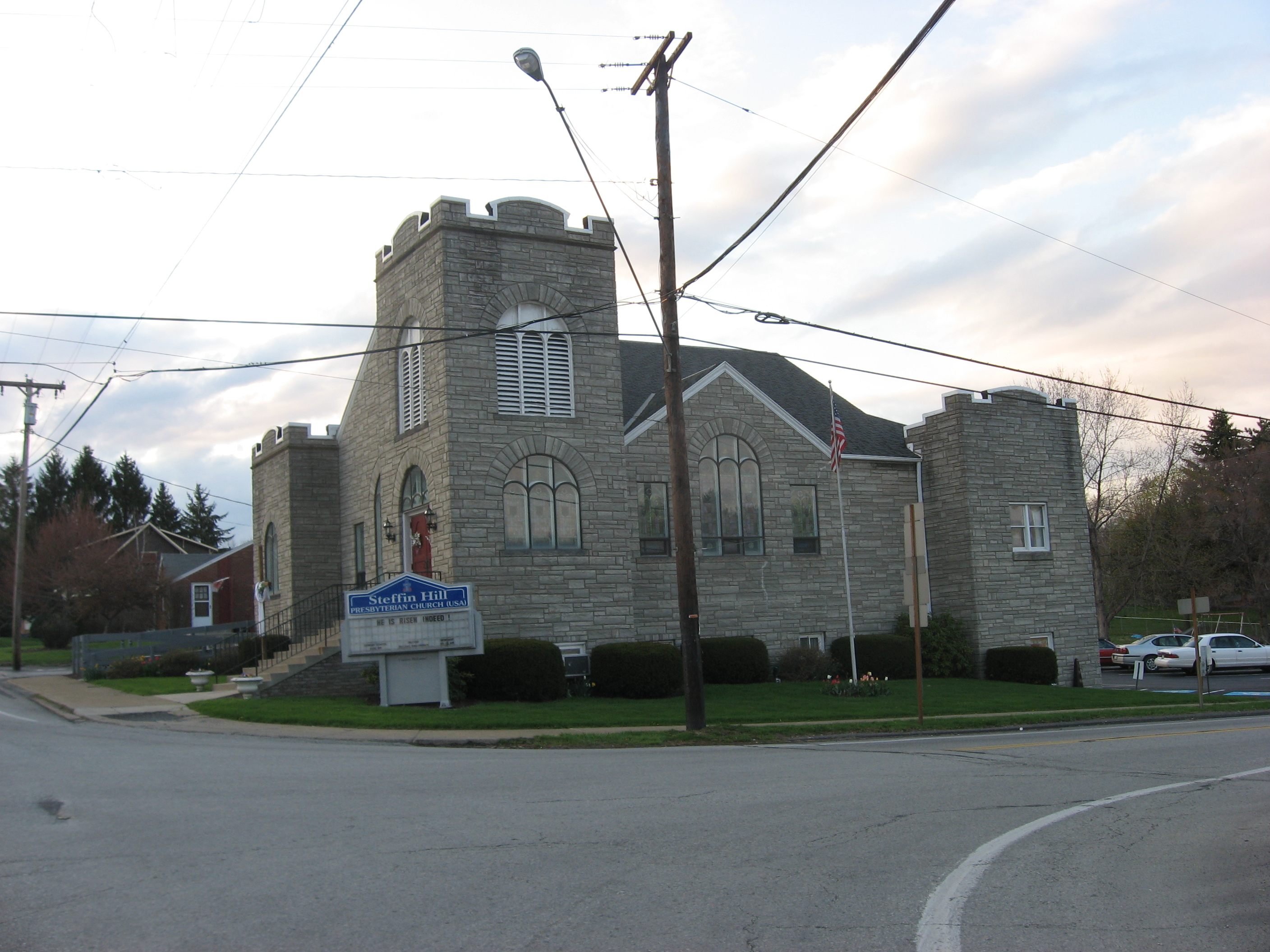
- Steffin Hill Presbyterian Church

- Location in Beaver County and state of Pennsylvania
- Country: United States
- State: Pennsylvania
- County: Beaver
- Settled: 1789
- Incorporated: 1887

Area
  - Total: 0.70 sq mi (1.81 km^{2})
  - Land: 0.70 sq mi (1.81 km^{2})
  - Water: 0 sq mi (0.00 km^{2})

Population (2020)
  - Total: 1,318 ▼
  - Estimate (2021): 1,300
  - Density: 1,943.3/sq mi (750.32/km^{2})
- Time zone: UTC-5 (Eastern (EST))
  - Summer (DST): UTC-4 (EDT)
- FIPS code: 42-007-84444
- Website: https://whitetwp.net/

White Township is a township that is located in Beaver County, Pennsylvania, United States. The population was 1,318 at the time of the 2020 census.

It is part of the Pittsburgh metropolitan area.

== Geography ==
According to the United States Census Bureau, the township has a total area of 0.69 square miles (1.8 km^{2}), all land.

=== Surrounding neighborhoods ===
White Township has four borders, including West Mayfield to the north, Beaver Falls to the east and southeast, Patterson Township to the Southwest and Chippewa Township to the west.

== Demographics ==
Historical population
Census	Pop.	Note	%±
1970	1,414		—
1980	1,870		32.2%
1990	1,610		−13.9%
2000	1,434		−10.9%
2010	1,394		−2.8%
2020	1,318		−5.5%
2021 (est.)	1,300		−1.4%
U.S. Decennial Census

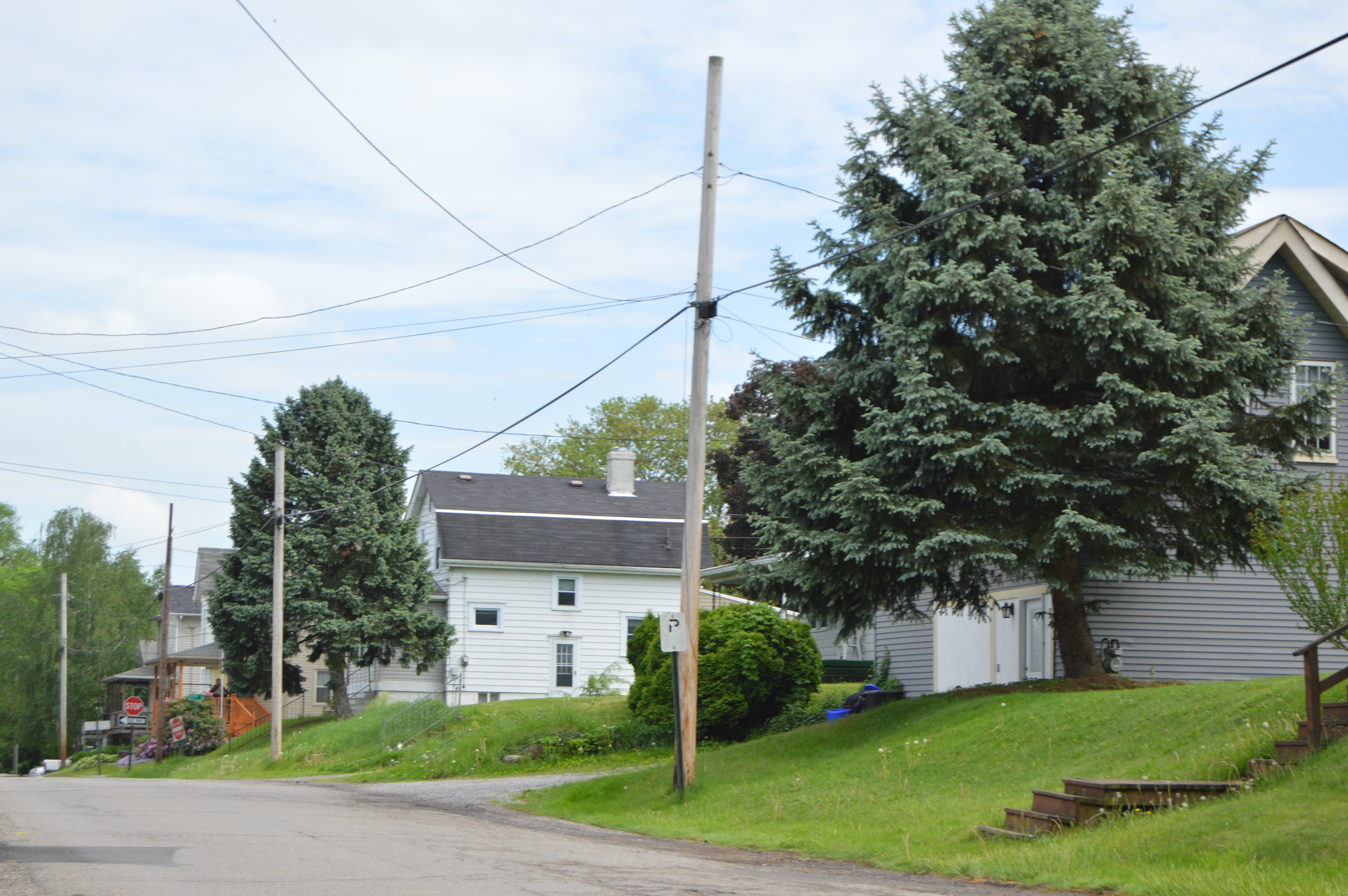
Houses on Twelfth Avenue

As of the 2000 census, there were 1,434 people, 628 households, and 396 families residing in the township.

The population density was 1,978.1 inhabitants per square mile (763.7/km^{2}). There were 667 housing units at an average density of 920.1 per square mile (355.3/km^{2}).

The racial makeup of the township was 87.31% White, 9.97% African American, 0.35% Native American, 0.42% Asian, 0.21% Pacific Islander, 0.42% from other races, and 1.32% from two or more races. Hispanic or Latino of any race were 0.84% of the population.

There were 628 households, out of which 28.7% had children who were under the age of 18 living with them, 45.5% were married couples living together, 14.6% had a female householder with no husband present, and 36.8% were non-families. Out of all of the households that were documented, 32.2% were made up of individuals, and 11.9% had someone living alone who was 65 years of age or older.

The average household size was 2.28 and the average family size was 2.86.

Within the township, the population was spread out, with 24.0% of residents who were under the age of 18, 8.4% who were aged 18 to 24, 27.6% who were aged 25 to 44, 25.5% who were aged 45 to 64, and 14.6% who were 65 years of age or older. The median age was 36 years.

For every one hundred females there were 84.3 males. For every one hundred females who were aged 18 or older, there were 78.7 males.

The median income for a household in the township was $34,375, and the median income for a family was $39,293. Males had a median income of $31,382 compared with that of $20,625 for females.

The per capita income for the township was $16,354.

Approximately 9.8% of families and 11.2% of the population were living below the poverty line, including 22.2% of those who were under the age of 18 and 4.6% of those who were aged 65 or older.
