= List of Pennsylvania state historical markers in Beaver County =

Location of Beaver County in Pennsylvania

This is a list of the Pennsylvania state historical markers in Beaver County.

This is intended to be a complete list of the official state historical markers placed in Beaver County, Pennsylvania by the Pennsylvania Historical and Museum Commission (PHMC). The locations of the historical markers, as well as the latitude and longitude coordinates as provided by the PHMC's database, are included below when available. There are 17 historical markers located in Beaver County.

== Historical markers ==
Marker title	Image	Date dedicated	Location	Marker type	Topics
Beaver County		July 5, 1982	County Courthouse, at park on 3rd Street (PA 68), Beaver(MISSING)	City	Business & Industry, Government & Politics, Government & Politics 19th Century, Transportation
Fort McIntosh		October 31, 1946	3rd Street (PA 68) at Insurance Street, Beaver; 40.69479°N 80.30601°W	Roadside	American Revolution, Forts, Military
Harmony Society Cemetery		December 2, 1963	Church Street & 11th Street, center of cemetery, Ambridge; 40.59304°N 80.23217°W	City	Religion
Harmony Society Church		September 11, 1967	Church Street near Creese Street, Ambridge; 40.59605°N 80.23218°W	City	Buildings, Religion
Ingram-Richardson Manufacturing Co.		May 4, 2001	24th Street Extension and 31st Street Extension, Beaver Falls; 40.7704°N 80.328°W	Roadside	Business & Industry
King Beaver's Town		September 25, 1946	3rd Street (PA 68) at Wilson Avenue, Beaver; 40.69742°N 80.29964°W	Roadside	Cities & Towns, Government & Politics, Government & Politics 18th Century, Native American
Legionville		September 25, 1946	Duss Avenue at Anthony Wayne Drive north of Ambridge; 40.62488°N 80.22926°W	Roadside	American Revolution, Cities & Towns, Military, Native American
Legionville		September 25, 1946	Duss Avenue at Anthony Wayne Drive, north of Ambridge (MISSING)	Roadside	American Revolution, Military
Logstown		October 31, 1946	Duss Avenue at Anthony Wayne Drive, north of Ambridge; 40.62283°N 80.2265°W	Roadside	Cities & Towns, Early Settlement, French & Indian War, Government & Politics, Government & Politics 18th Century, Native American
Logstown - PLAQUE		June 1, 1918	Duss Avenue at Anthony Wayne Drive, north of Ambridge (MISSING); 40.6228°N 79.7734°W	Plaque	Early Settlement, French & Indian War, Native American
Matthew S. Quay		July 22, 1949	3rd Street (PA 68) at Insurance Street, Beaver; 40.69464°N 80.30617°W	Roadside	Government & Politics, Government & Politics 19th Century
NLRB v. Jones & Laughlin Supreme Court Ruling		April 8, 2000	112 Station Street, Aliquippa; 40.61964°N 80.2428°W	Roadside	Government & Politics 20th Century, Labor
Old Economy		n/a	PA 65 in Ambridge, across from site 40.59565°N 80.23218°W	Roadside	Religion
Old Economy Memorial		n/a	Old Economy, 13th & Church Streets, Ambridge; 40.59585°N 80.23373°W	Roadside	Religion
Pennsylvania		March 25, 1949	US 30, .4 miles from state line (MISSING)	Roadside	Government & Politics, Government & Politics 17th Century, William Penn
Pennsylvania		March 25, 1949	PA 68 at state line (MISSING)	Roadside	Government & Politics, Government & Politics 17th Century, William Penn
White Cottage		May 27, 1969	1221 3rd Avenue (PA 65/18), New Brighton; 40.73084°N 80.31003°W	City	Houses & Homesteads, Women, Writers

== See also ==
- List of Pennsylvania state historical markers
- National Register of Historic Places listings in Beaver County, Pennsylvania
