= Cannelton, Pennsylvania =

Unincorporated community in Pennsylvania, US

Cannelton is an unincorporated community located in Darlington Township, Beaver County, Pennsylvania, approximately three miles west of Darlington. Settled in 1795, the Darlington Cannel Coal Railroad was built there starting in 1852 eventually connecting to the Pennsylvania Railroad in New Galilee, Pennsylvania. Cannelton derived its name from the cannel coal that was mined there beginning in 1838.
