= Brighton Township, Pennsylvania =

Township in Pennsylvania, US

- Township
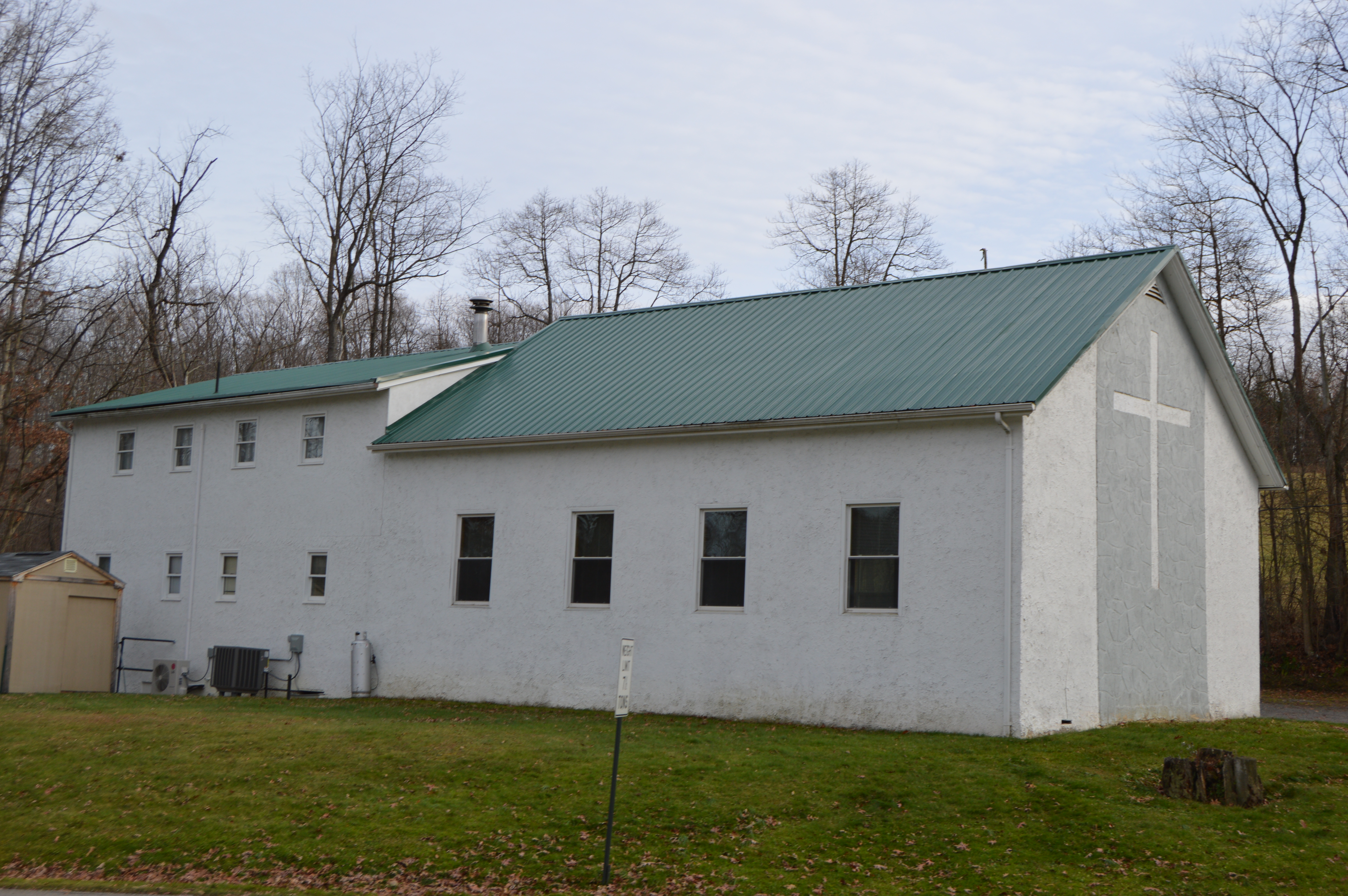
- Tusca Area Reformed Presbyterian Church

- Seal

- Location in Beaver County and state of Pennsylvania
- Coordinates: 40°43′20″N 80°20′29″W
- Country: United States
- State: Pennsylvania
- County: Beaver
- Settled: 1798
- Incorporated: 1816

Area
  - Total: 19.44 sq mi (50.36 km^{2})
  - Land: 19.41 sq mi (50.26 km^{2})
  - Water: 0.039 sq mi (0.10 km^{2})

Population (2020)
  - Total: 8,791 ▲
  - Estimate (2022): 8,763
  - Density: 431.3/sq mi (166.52/km^{2})
- Time zone: UTC-5 (Eastern (EST))
  - Summer (DST): UTC-4 (EDT)
- FIPS code: 42-007-08680
- Website: www.brightontwp.org

Brighton Township is a township in Beaver County, Pennsylvania, United States. The population was 8,791 at the 2020 census. It is part of the Pittsburgh metropolitan area.

== History ==
In late 2007, it was proposed that the borough of Beaver and Brighton Township combine. According to a report by the Governor's Center for Local Government Services, the two municipalities would possibly derive a significant financial benefit from uniting. Also being considered was the type of combination: either merger, in which one of the municipalities would be annexed by the other, or consolidation, in which the two would become a single new municipality under a new name. Any union would require voter approval.

== Geography ==
According to the United States Census Bureau, the township has a total area of 19.5 square miles (50.4 km^{2}), of which 19.4 square miles (50.3 km^{2}) is land and 0.04 square miles (0.1 km^{2}), or 0.20%, is water.

=== Surrounding neighborhoods ===
Brighton Township has nine borders with Chippewa Township to the north, Patterson Township and Fallston to the northeast, Bridgewater to the east, Beaver to the southeast, Vanport Township to the south-southeast, Industry to the south, Ohioville to the west, and South Beaver Township in the northwestern corner.

== Demographics ==
Historical population
Census	Pop.	Note	%±
1970	7,532		—
1980	7,858		4.3%
1990	7,489		−4.7%
2000	8,024		7.1%
2010	8,227		2.5%
2020	8,791		6.9%
2022 (est.)	8,763		−0.3%
U.S. Decennial Census

As of the 2000 census, there were 8,024 people, 2,783 households, and 2,193 families residing in the township. The population density was 422.1 inhabitants per square mile (163.0/km^{2}). There were 2,875 housing units at an average density of 151.2/sq mi (58.4/km^{2}). The racial makeup of the township was 97.96% White, 1.07% African American, 0.05% Native American, 0.44% Asian, 0.01% Pacific Islander, 0.06% from other races, and 0.41% from two or more races. Hispanic or Latino of any race were 0.61% of the population.

There were 2,783 households, out of which 33.0% had children under the age of 18 living with them, 70.1% were married couples living together, 6.4% had a female householder with no husband present, and 21.2% were non-families. 19.4% of all households were made up of individuals, and 10.5% had someone living alone who was 65 years of age or older. The average household size was 2.63 and the average family size was 3.02.

In the township the population was spread out, with 23.1% under the age of 18, 5.0% from 18 to 24, 23.8% from 25 to 44, 25.8% from 45 to 64, and 22.3% who were 65 years of age or older. The median age was 44 years. For every 100 females there were 88.0 males. For every 100 females age 18 and over, there were 82.1 males.

The median income for a household in the township was $52,008, and the median income for a family was $58,895. Males had a median income of $48,173 versus $29,682 for females. The per capita income for the township was $22,437. About 2.0% of families and 3.7% of the population were below the poverty line, including 2.7% of those under age 18 and 5.3% of those age 65 or over.
