= William B. Dunlap Mansion =

Historic house in Pennsylvania, United States

- U.S. National Register of Historic Places
- U.S. Historic district – Contributing property
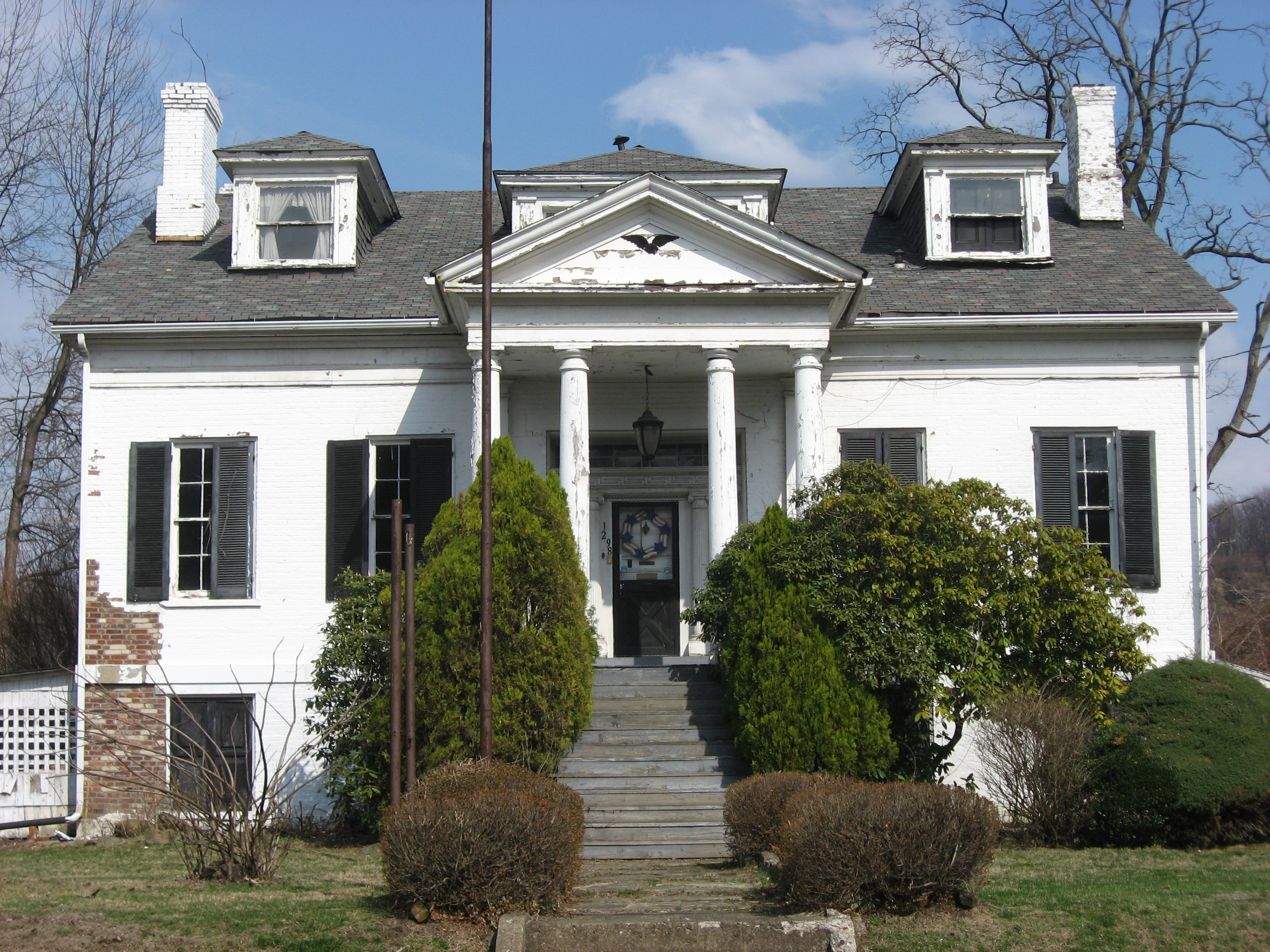
- Front of the mansion

- Location within Pennsylvania Location within the United States
- Location: 1298 Market St., Bridgewater, Pennsylvania
- Coordinates: 40°42′28″N 80°17′53″W
- Area: 0.6 acres (0.24 ha)
- Built: 1840
- Architectural style: Greek Revival
- Demolished: 16 January 2017
- Part of: Bridgewater Historic District (ID96000713)
- NRHP reference No.: 80003409
- Added to NRHP: August 29, 1980

The William B. Dunlap Mansion was a historic house in Bridgewater, Pennsylvania, United States. Erected in 1840 on a bluff over the Beaver River in the northern part of the borough, it has been ranked as the grandest and best-preserved 19th-century house in Bridgewater. On January 16, 2017, the structure was demolished by borough authorities following condemnation.

== History ==
The mansion was built for coffee entrepreneur James Arbuckle, whose architect employed the Greek Revival style of architecture. Arbuckle lived in the house until 1865, when he sold it to Samuel R. Dunlap and his family. Among the mansion's new residents was Samuel's son William, who ran his river transportation business from the house. Upon Samuel's death in 1890, the house passed into William; he continued to reside at the property until his own death in 1922. During these years, the house was the home of a public official: William was elected to represent the 46th District in the Pennsylvania State Senate in 1890, and he remained in this position until his death. After his death, the house passed through the hands of few owners; it changed ownership very few times and was only rarely vacant, and thus it has seen less change than most period houses. Except for a period as the home of a veterans' organization, the mansion has always been used as a residence, although would-be buyers sought to convert it into offices or a print shop.

Dunlap's mansion is a three-story brick structure built on a stone foundation, with four large chimneys and a cedar interior. Although the house is currently surrounded by a lawn and shrubs, it was once surrounded by a formal garden that may have been larger than any other such garden in western Pennsylvania.

On August 29, 1980, the house was added to the National Register of Historic Places for its architecture and for its association with William B. Dunlap. It is also a contributing property to a historic district, the Bridgewater Historic District, which was listed on the National Register in 1996.

Following a court order obtained upon the city's request, the mansion was demolished on January 16, 2017. 15-20 by-passers watched the historic mansion being demolished. According to the code enforcement officer, "plaster was falling from the ceiling, the boiler had rusted into place and floorboards were rotting". The owner (John Provich Jr.) was given a year to bring the house up to code before demolition would proceed, but no renovation was done.
