= Chippewa Township, Pennsylvania =

Township in Pennsylvania, US

Coordinates: 40°46′10″N 80°22′34″W

- Township
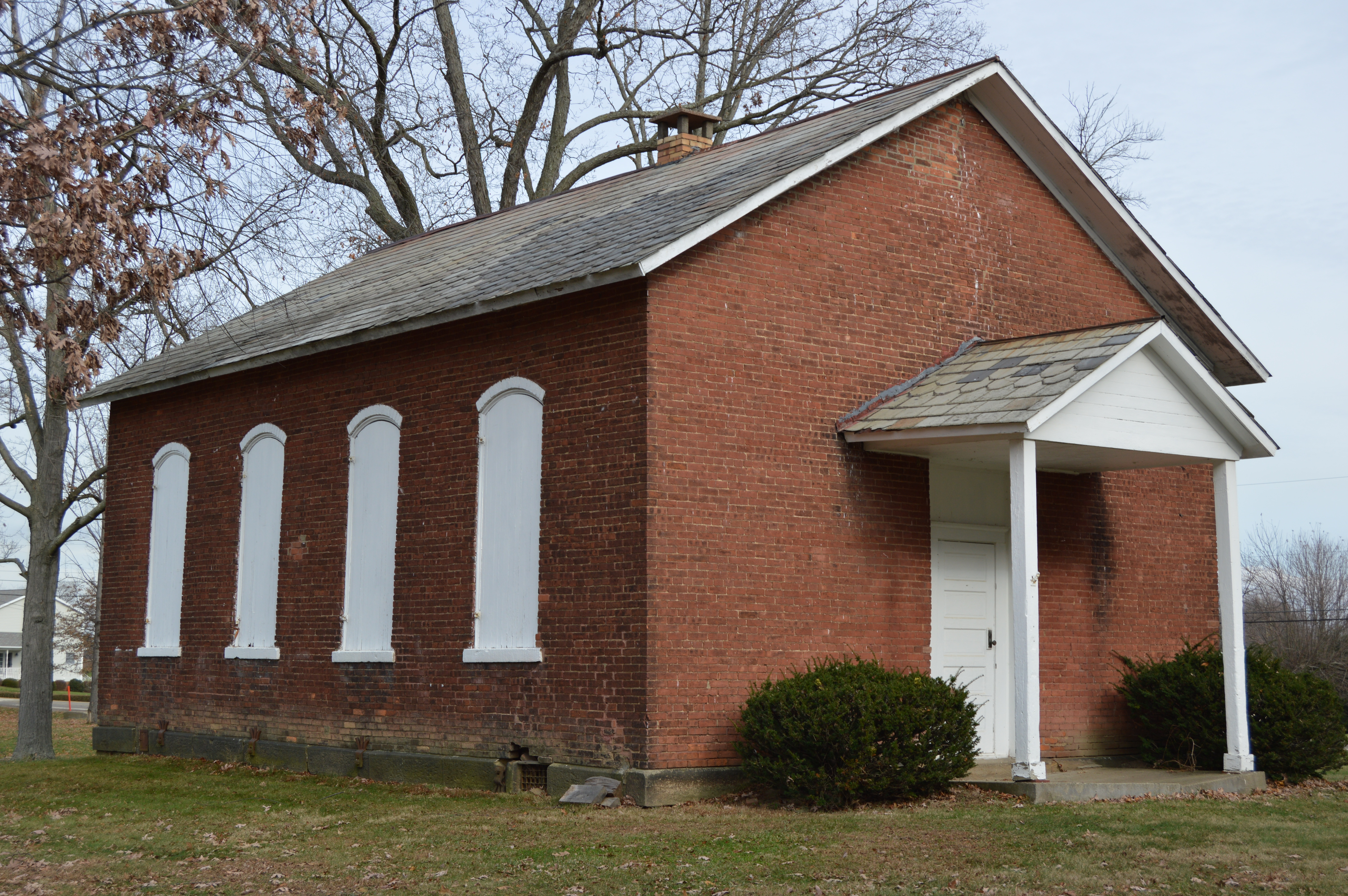
- Former McKinley School #3

- Seal Logo

- Location in Beaver County and state of Pennsylvania
- Country: United States
- State: Pennsylvania
- County: Beaver
- Incorporated: 1816

Government
  - Type: Board of Supervisors
  - Chairman: James R. Bouril
  - Vice chairman: Daniel Woodske
  - Supervisor: Nancy Lamey

Area
  - Total: 15.69 sq mi (40.64 km^{2})
  - Land: 15.69 sq mi (40.64 km^{2})
  - Water: 0 sq mi (0.00 km^{2})

Population (2020)
  - Total: 8,040 ▲
  - Estimate (2022): 7,949
  - Density: 493.3/sq mi (190.46/km^{2})
- Time zone: UTC-5 (Eastern (EST))
  - Summer (DST): UTC-4 (EDT)
- ZIP Code: 15010
- FIPS code: 42-007-13488
- Website: Website

Chippewa Township is a township in Beaver County, Pennsylvania, United States. The population was 8,040 at the 2020 census. The township shares the ZIP Code of nearby Beaver Falls. It is part of the Pittsburgh metropolitan area.

== Geography ==
According to the United States Census Bureau, the township has a total area of 15.7 square miles (40.6 km^{2}), all land.

=== Surrounding neighborhoods ===
Chippewa Township has seven borders, including Big Beaver to the north, West Mayfield to the northeast, White Township to the east, Patterson Township to the southeast, Brighton Township to the south, South Beaver Township to the west, and a very small border with Darlington Township to the northwest.

== Demographics ==
Historical population
Census	Pop.	Note	%±
1970	6,654		—
1980	7,245		8.9%
1990	6,988		−3.5%
2000	7,021		0.5%
2010	7,620		8.5%
2020	8,040		5.5%
2022 (est.)	7,949		−1.1%
U.S. Decennial Census

As of the 2000 census, there were 7,021 people, 2,807 households, and 2,049 families residing in the township. The population density was 442.0 inhabitants per square mile (170.7/km^{2}). There were 2,933 housing units at an average density of 184.7 per square mile (71.3/km^{2}). The racial makeup of the township was 97.61% White, 0.93% African American, 0.01% Native American, 0.61% Asian, 0.03% Pacific Islander, 0.13% from other races, and 0.68% from two or more races. Hispanic or Latino of any race were 0.27% of the population.

There were 2,807 households, out of which 29.4% had children under the age of 18 living with them, 64.9% were married couples living together, 6.1% had a female householder with no husband present, and 27.0% were non-families. 24.6% of all households were made up of individuals, and 11.8% had someone living alone who was 65 years of age or older. The average household size was 2.47 and the average family size was 2.96.

In the township the population was spread out, with 22.7% under the age of 18, 5.7% from 18 to 24, 26.3% from 25 to 44, 26.9% from 45 to 64, and 18.3% who were 65 years of age or older. The median age was 42 years. For every 100 females there were 95.7 males. For every 100 females age 18 and over, there were 93.6 males.

The median income for a household in the township was $51,361, and the median income for a family was $62,095. Males had a median income of $44,814 versus $26,690 for females. The per capita income for the township was $23,666. About 3.0% of families and 3.7% of the population were below the poverty line, including 4.3% of those under age 18 and 3.6% of those age 65 or over.

== Education ==
Children residing in Chippewa Township attend the Blackhawk School District. There are four schools in the district: Patterson Primary School (K-2), Blackhawk Intermediate School (3–5), Highland Middle School (6–8), and Blackhawk High School (9–12). Students in Patterson Township attend Patterson Primary School until third grade where they merge at Blackhawk Intermediate School. Also, the students who live towards Darlington and the South Beaver area go to Blackhawk Intermediate School from K to 5th with the students who went to Patterson Primary School.
