= Merrill Lock No. 6 =

- U.S. National Register of Historic Places
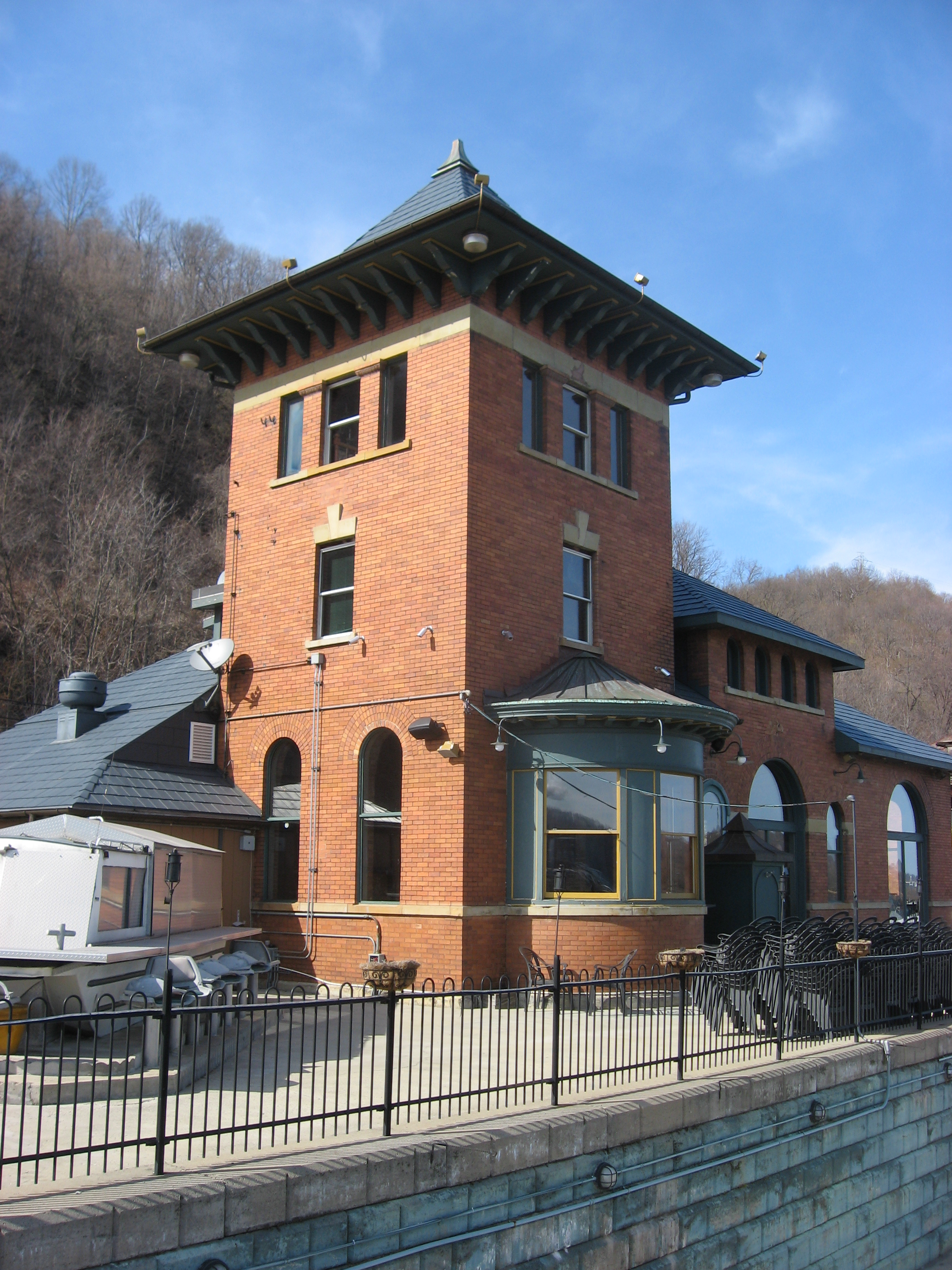
- Contemporary view of the main building

- Location within Pennsylvania Location within the United States
- Location: Pennsylvania Route 68
- Nearest city: Industry, Pennsylvania, United States
- Coordinates: 40°40′7″N 80°21′6″W
- Area: 2.43 acres (9,830 m²)
- Built: 1892–1904
- Architect: United States Army Corps of Engineers
- Architectural style: Romanesque
- NRHP reference No.: 80003410
- Added to NRHP: September 4, 1980

The Merrill Lock No. 6 is the remnant of a historic lock and dam complex located along the Ohio River at Industry, Pennsylvania, United States. The remaining buildings, which now compose a restaurant, are together listed on the National Register of Historic Places.

== Construction ==
The dam was built at the community of Merrill (now a part of the borough of Industry), near the mouth of Raccoon Creek, as part of the process of canalization of the Ohio River. Construction began at the site on June 2, 1892, several years before many of Pennsylvania's other Ohio River dams were started. By late 1903, construction was virtually complete; only the lock gates remained to be placed, as well as the necessary buildings that were yet unfinished. Within a year, the gates had been added and the buildings completed. Operations began on August 3, 1904; the entire project had cost $1,123,441.80. The complex was named for William Emery Merrill, an officer of the United States Army Corps of Engineers who had been responsible for the earliest successful Ohio River dam in Pennsylvania.

== Site profile ==
Lock No. 6 itself was a concrete structure, 600 feet by 110 feet (180 m by 33 m); its first gates were built of pine wood, but steel gates were eventually put in their place. It lay at the northern end of the dam, which had a 600-foot (180 m) spillway and included a weir and two other locks. The three buildings on the site were a three-story powerhouse (measuring about sixty feet/18 m square), which contained the machinery to operate the lock, and with two identical 2 1/2-story residences for the lock master and for the crew that worked at the site. All three buildings were built of brick on a concrete foundation and roofed with slate.

Only one modification to the site was made during the lock's operational years. In the early 1920s, the engines in the powerhouse were converted from coal-burning to oil-burning; this was a purely interior change and had no effect on the exterior of the building.

== Recent history ==
After the construction of the Montgomery Locks and Dam downstream in 1936, the Merrill Lock and Dam ceased to operate. It was recognized for its historical integrity on September 4, 1980, when the buildings, all brick Romanesque structures, were listed on the National Register of Historic Places. By this time, the buildings had been abandoned for nearly 45 years, but they still remained in their original places and in virtually original condition—a status unequalled by any comparable site. After a period of reconstruction, the powerhouse was opened in early 2000 as a restaurant, the Lock 6 Landing. Its position along the riverside enables the restaurant to operate a marina for passing boaters. The lock master's residence, located downstream of the powerhouse, was removed at some point after the property was listed on the Register.
