= Bridgewater Historic District (Bridgewater, Pennsylvania) =

Historic district in Pennsylvania, United States

- U.S. National Register of Historic Places
- U.S. Historic district
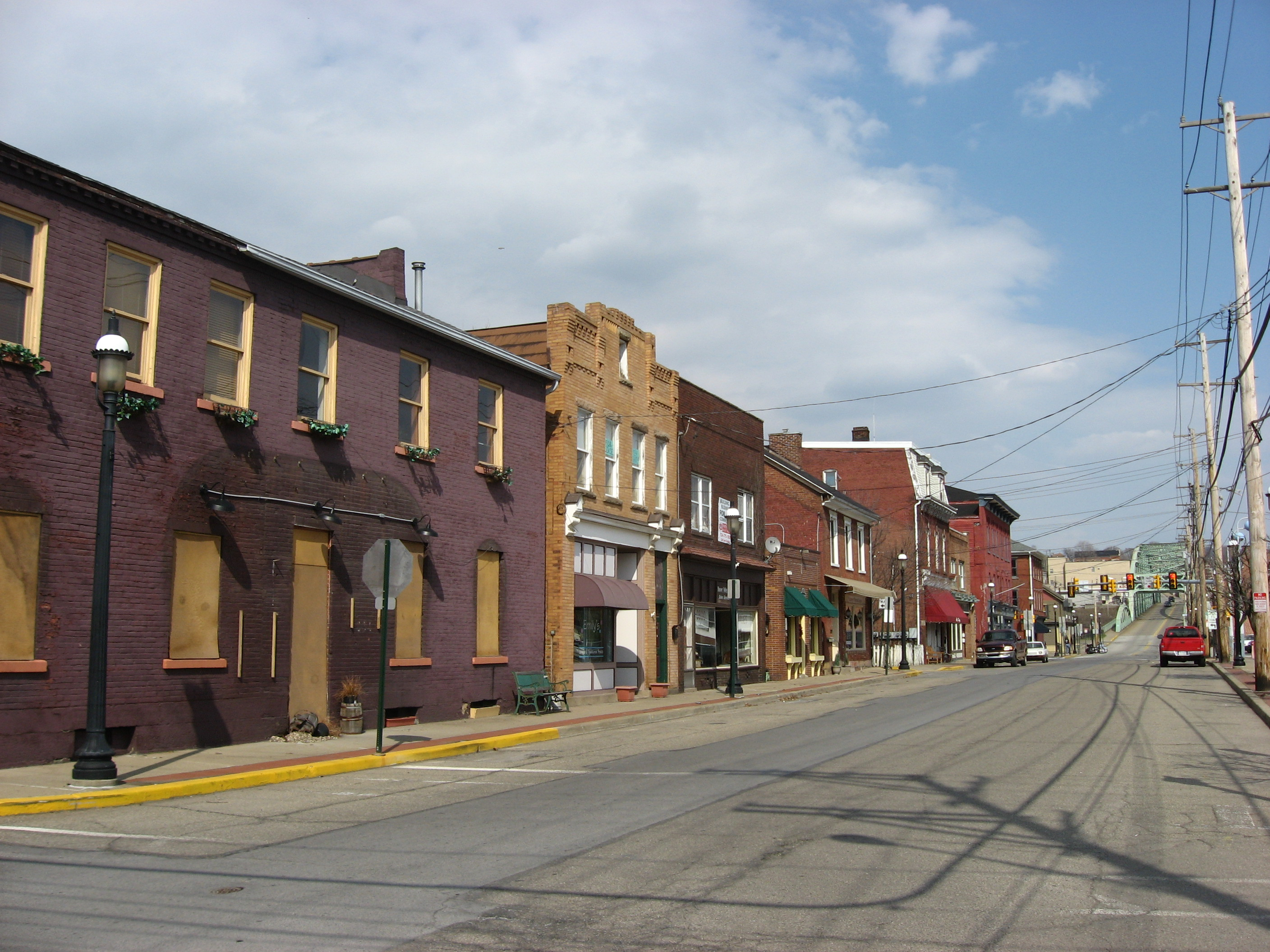
- Bridge Street

- Location within Pennsylvania

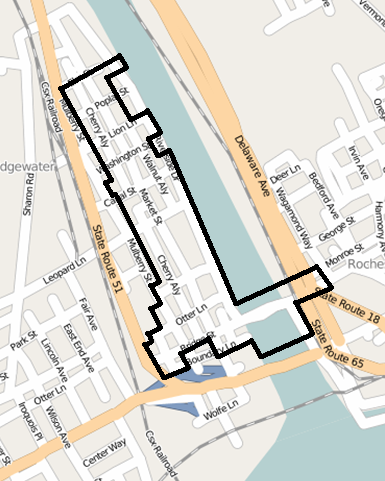
- Map of the Bridgewater Historic District
- Location: Bridgewater, Pennsylvania
- Coordinates: 40°42′22″N 80°17′40″W
- Area: 72.1 acres (29.2 ha)
- Built: 1834
- Architectural style: Greek Revival, Italianate, Queen Anne
- NRHP reference No.: 96000713
- Added to NRHP: June 28, 1996

The Bridgewater Historic District is a historic district in Bridgewater, Pennsylvania, United States. Listed on the National Register of Historic Places on June 28, 1996, it includes buildings built between 1818 and 1933, although the most significant buildings in the district are those that were built before the Civil War in the 1860s. Located at the confluence of the Ohio and Beaver Rivers, Bridgewater was a transportation center as the terminus of the Bridgewater Canal during the pre–Civil War era. This prosperity is reflected in many of the district's buildings: the adjacent communities of Beaver and Rochester were less significant during that time, and accordingly have a much smaller number of period buildings.

The district includes the Bridgewater-Rochester Bridge, a canal lock for the Bridgewater Canal, and 97 buildings. Among its contributing properties are three churches, the Keystone Bakery, and the William B. Dunlap Mansion, which is separately listed on the Register. Because the bridge spans the Beaver River to Rochester, a small portion of the district is located in Rochester. Another building in the district is the house of Joseph Hemphill, a local landowner who platted much of Bridgewater in 1818. Built in 1818, it is Bridgewater's oldest extant house.

During Bridgewater's heyday, Bridge Street was a vibrant downtown street. Its buildings housed a wide variety of businesses, ranging from offices to stores to metalworking shops. Among the leading businesses of Bridge Street, the Keystone Bakery, was once the largest bakery in Western Pennsylvania outside of Pittsburgh and Allegheny. Now located on Market Street, Keystone left Bridge Street in 1884 because of its rapid expansion.

The Bridgewater United Methodist Church was organized in 1839 and built its first building in the same year. Its current building, a Gothic Revival structure located on Market Street, was erected in 1907. First Presbyterian Church worships in a Romanesque Revival church at the western end of Bridge Street. The congregation was founded as the result of an 1845 split in the Presbyterian church in Rochester. Built in 1845 and remodelled several times since, the church remains in use to the present day.
