= Blackhawk High School =

Coordinates: 40.76417°N 80.39878°W

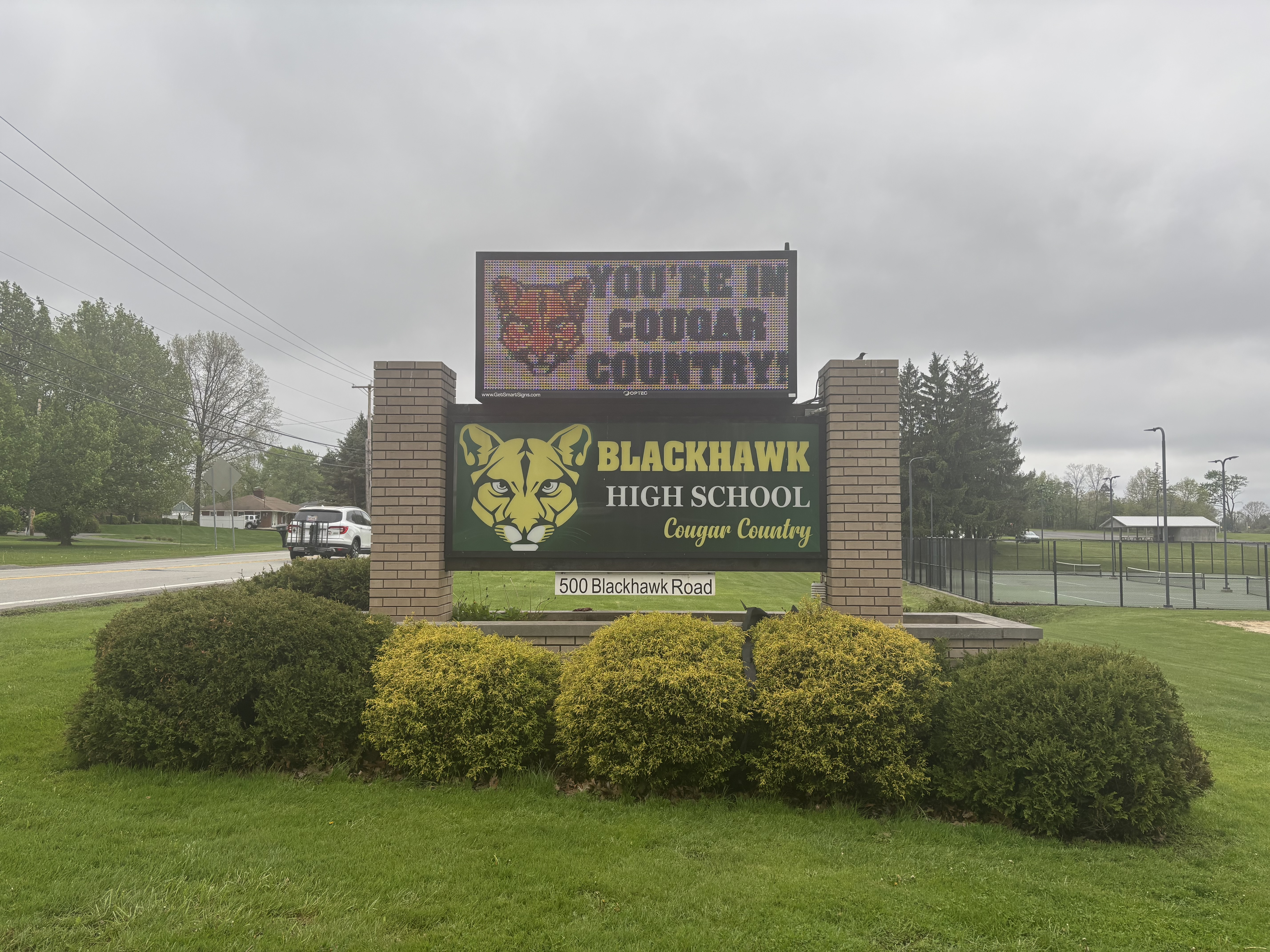

Location
- 500 Blackhawk Road; Chippewa Township (Beaver Falls), Pennsylvania 15010; United States

Information
- Type: Public high school
- Established: 1973
- School district: Blackhawk School District
- Principal: Rick Ford
- Teaching staff: 49.86 (FTE)
- Grades: 9-12
- Enrollment: 763 (2024–2025)
- Student to teacher ratio: 15.30
- Colors: Green and gold
- Fight song: "Victory March"
- Athletics conference: Western Pennsylvania Interscholastic Athletic League
- Team name: Cougars
- Rival: Beaver Falls High School
- Website: www.bsd.k12.pa.us/blackhawkhighschool_home.aspx

Blackhawk High School is a public high school in Chippewa Township, Pennsylvania, United States, with a mailing address for nearby Beaver Falls. It is the only high school in the Blackhawk School District. Athletic teams compete as the Blackhawk Cougars in the Western Pennsylvania Interscholastic Athletic League.

== Demographics ==
According to the Pennsylvania Department of Education, during the 2024–25 school year, Blackhawk High School reported an enrollment of 763 pupils in grades 9 through 12, with 36.8% of pupils being regarded as economically disadvantaged. The school's student population is 93.2% White, 1.3% Black, 0.4% Asian, 0.1% American Indian or Alaska Native, 2.2% Hispanic, and 2.8% from two or more races.

== Extracurriculars ==
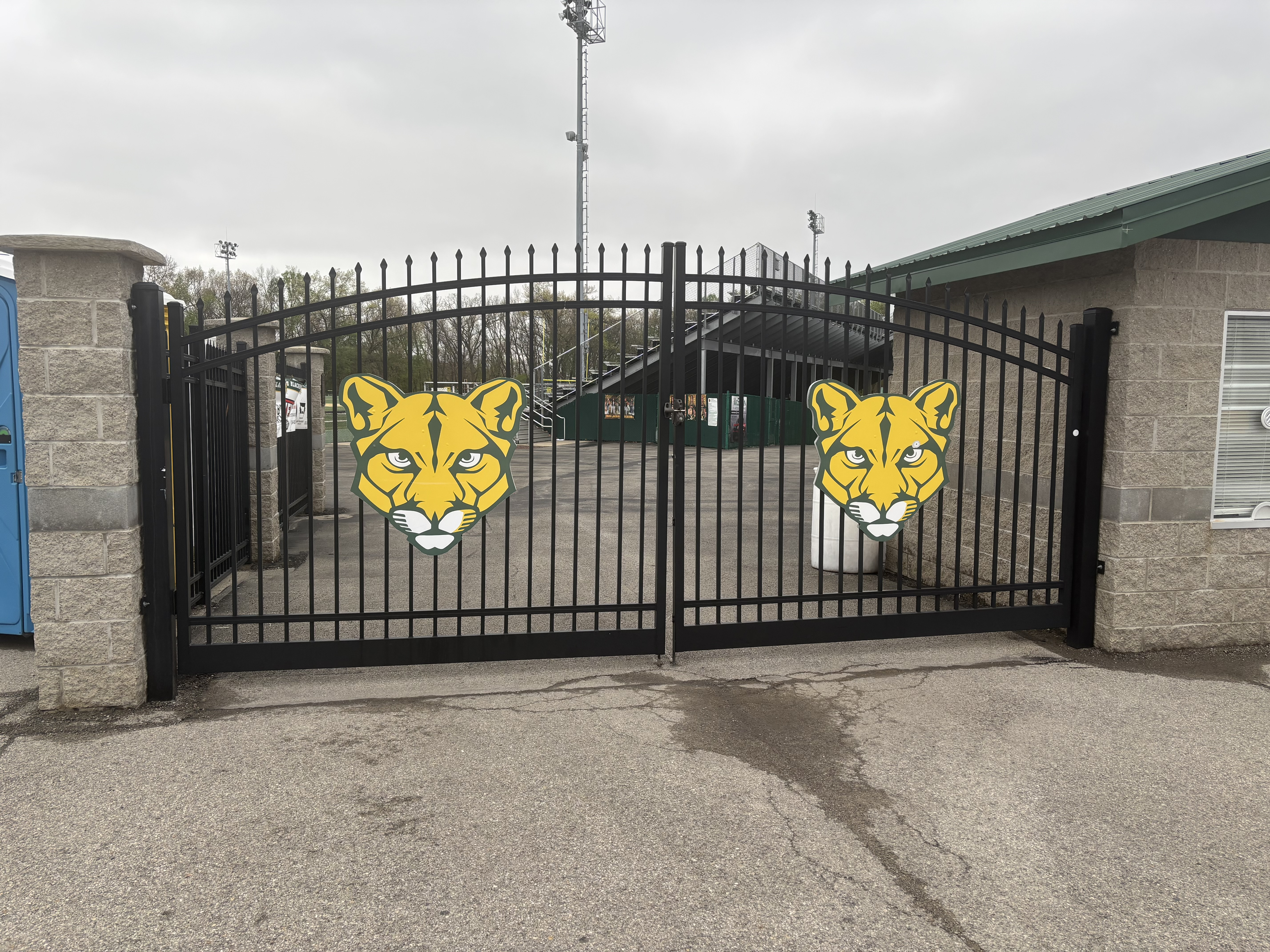
The entrance to Blackhawk Stadium

The district offers a variety of clubs, activities and sports. Sports include wrestling, golf, soccer, football, baseball, softball, volleyball, swimming, tennis, lacrosse, hockey, and track and field.

In the 2011 season, the Blackhawk men's varsity soccer team went undefeated for the first time, finishing with a record of 16-0-1, and defeating archrival Beaver in the last game of the regular season for the section title.

There are an orchestra, concert band, marching band who won the 2014 PIMBA championship, jazz band, pit orchestra for the musicals and plays, and indoor competitions consisting of indoor percussion competition and indoor color guard performances for the winter months. BHS also offers the Music Academy for students considering a professional job in the realm of music. These students have the opportunity to take more music related classes instead of academic classes and includes extra band classes. The music academy requires no higher academic achievement, but does allow for fewer state required classes.

== Notable alumni ==
- Greg Best, football player
- Dante Calabria, basketball player
- Jim Cantamessa, basketball player and coach
- Clayton Hamilton, baseball player
- Adam Liberatore, MLB baseball player, Los Angeles Dodgers
- Brendan McKay, baseball player
- Archie Miller, basketball player and coach
- Sean Miller, basketball player and coach
- Brian Omogrosso, baseball player
