= South Beaver Township, Pennsylvania =

Township in Pennsylvania, US

Coordinates: 40°47′10″N 80°26′32″W

- Township
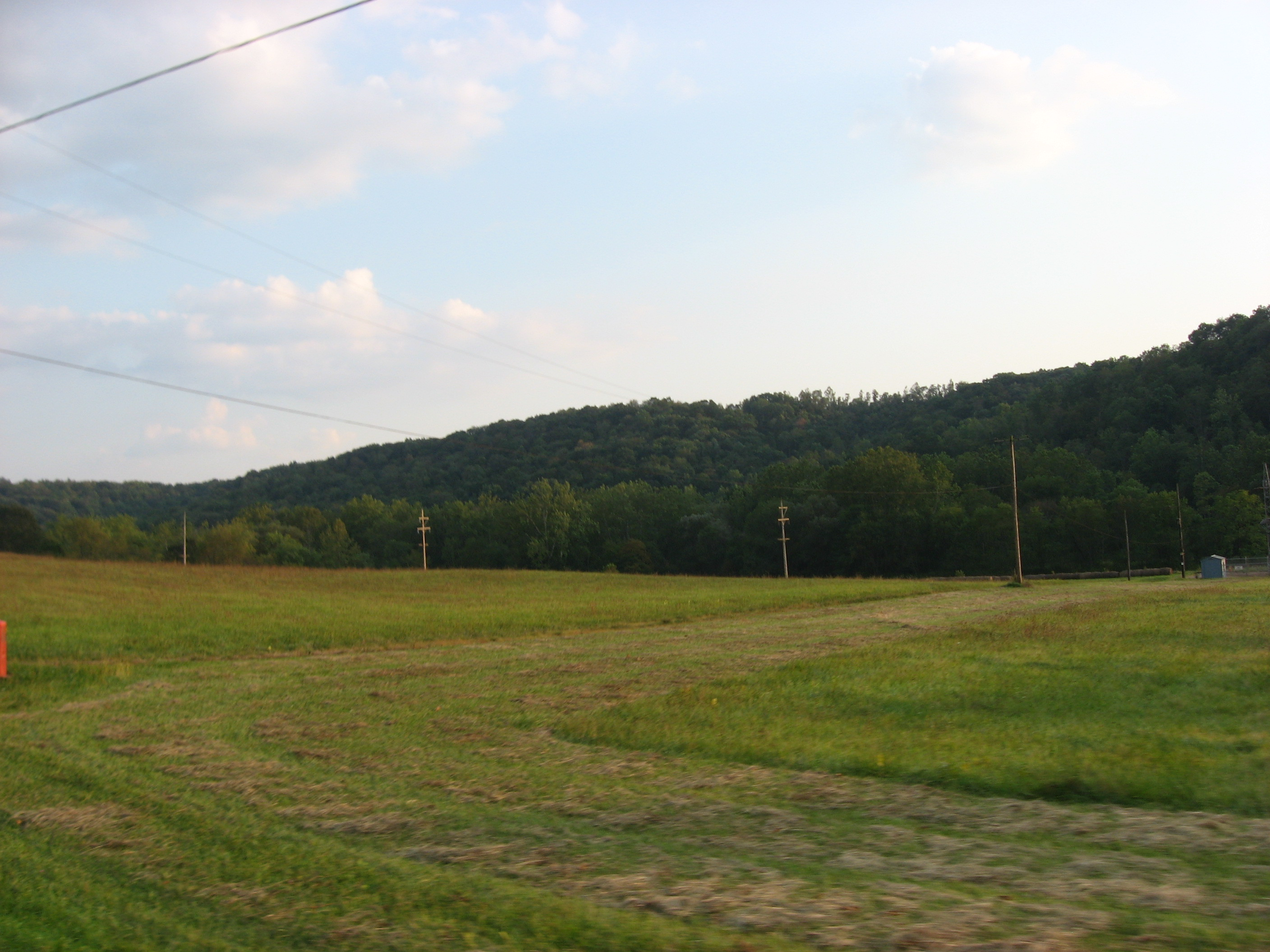
- Countryside in South Beaver Township

- Location in Beaver County and state of Pennsylvania
- Country: United States
- State: Pennsylvania
- County: Beaver
- Incorporated: 1800

Area
  - Total: 29.77 sq mi (77.10 km^{2})
  - Land: 29.69 sq mi (76.89 km^{2})
  - Water: 0.081 sq mi (0.21 km^{2})

Population (2020)
  - Total: 2,690 ▼
  - Estimate (2021): 2,659
  - Density: 89.1/sq mi (34.39/km^{2})
- Time zone: UTC-5 (Eastern (EST))
  - Summer (DST): UTC-4 (EDT)
- FIPS code: 42-007-71952
- Website: www.southbeavertwp.com

South Beaver Township is a township in Beaver County, Pennsylvania, United States. The population was 2,690 at the 2020 census. It is part of the Pittsburgh metropolitan area.

== History ==
Darlington and South Beaver townships are connected by the Watts Mill Bridge, which is listed on the National Register of Historic Places as the "Bridge in South Beaver Township".

== Geography ==
According to the United States Census Bureau, the township has a total area of 29.8 square miles (77.1 km^{2}), of which 29.7 square miles (76.9 km^{2}) is land and 0.077 square miles (0.2 km^{2}), or 0.27%, is water.

=== Surrounding neighborhoods ===
South Beaver Township has five borders, with Darlington Township to the north, Chippewa Township to the east, Brighton Township to the southeast, Ohioville to the south, and Middleton Township, Ohio, to the west.

== Demographics ==
Historical population
Census	Pop.	Note	%±
1970	2,339		—
1980	2,932		25.4%
1990	2,942		0.3%
2000	2,974		1.1%
2010	2,717		−8.6%
2020	2,690		−1.0%
2021 (est.)	2,659		−1.2%
U.S. Decennial Census

As of the 2000 census, there were 2,974 people, 1,090 households, and 821 families residing in the township. The population density was 99.1 inhabitants per square mile (38.3/km^{2}). There were 1,139 housing units at an average density of 38.0 per square mile (14.7/km^{2}). The racial makeup of the township was 98.02% White, 1.24% African American, 0.10% Native American, 0.20% Asian, 0.10% from other races, and 0.34% from two or more races. Hispanic or Latino of any race were 0.37% of the population.

There were 1,090 households, out of which 29.8% had children under the age of 18 living with them, 66.0% were married couples living together, 6.3% had a female householder with no husband present, and 24.6% were non-families. 21.7% of all households were made up of individuals, and 7.8% had someone living alone who was 65 years of age or older. The average household size was 2.55 and the average family size was 2.97.

In the township the population was spread out, with 21.0% under the age of 18, 5.6% from 18 to 24, 24.9% from 25 to 44, 27.7% from 45 to 64, and 20.6% who were 65 years of age or older. The median age was 44 years. For every 100 females, there were 92.6 males. For every 100 females age 18 and over, there were 89.8 males.

The median income for a household in the township was $43,835, and the median income for a family was $50,673. Males had a median income of $36,090 versus $25,809 for females. The per capita income for the township was $18,913. About 1.6% of families and 3.0% of the population were below the poverty line, including 2.0% of those under age 18 and 4.9% of those age 65 or over.

== Recreation ==
Portions of the Pennsylvania State Game Lands Number 285 are located in the township.
