= William B. Dunlap =

American politician

William Boyd Dunlap

Member of the Pennsylvania Senate from the 46th district
- In office 1891–1894
- Preceded by: J. R. McLain
- Succeeded by: Samuel P. White
- Constituency: Parts of Beaver and Washington Counties

Personal details
- Resting place: Beaver Cemetery; Beaver, Pennsylvania
- Party: Democratic

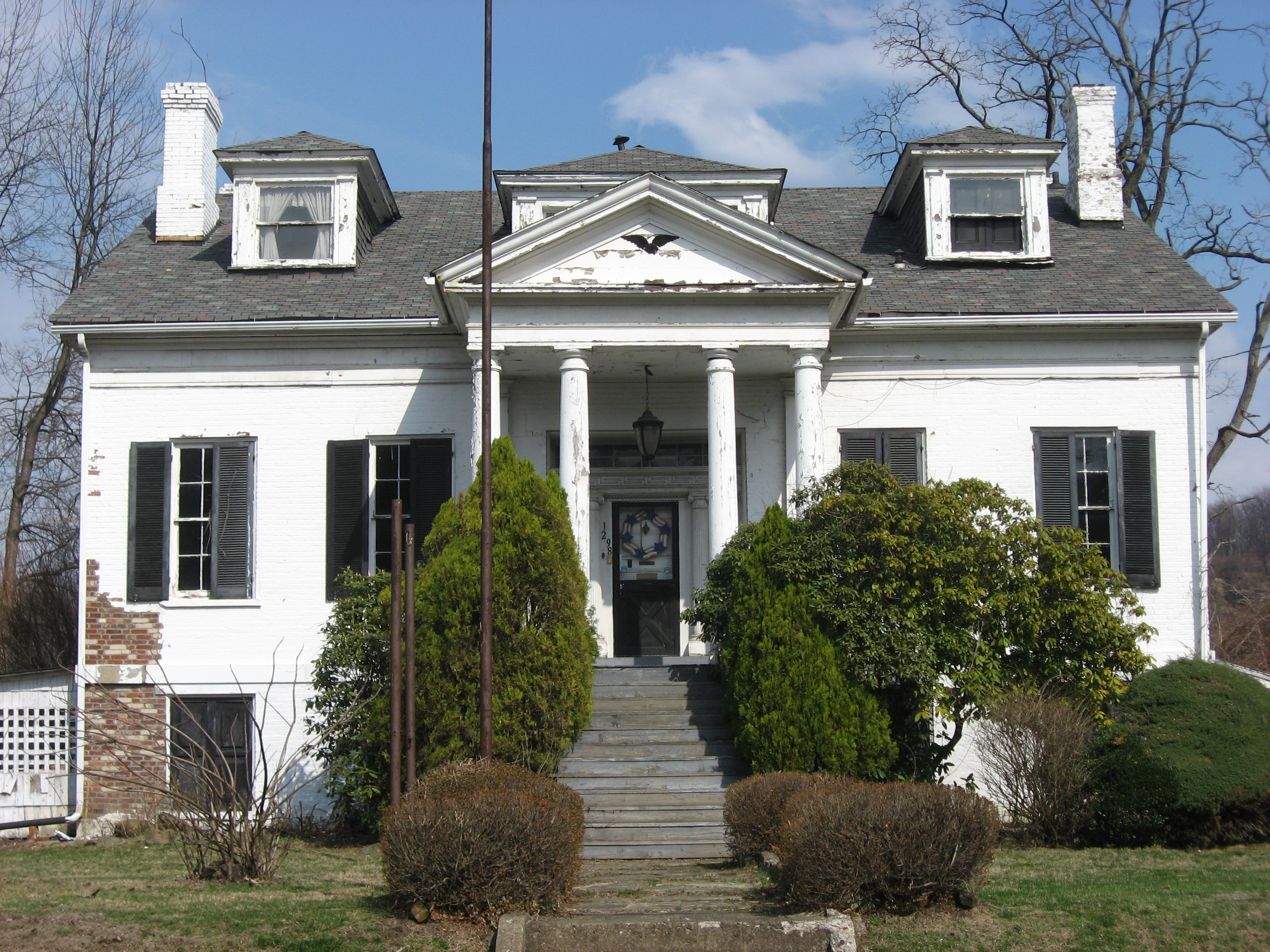
Dunlap's home

William Boyd Dunlap was a former Democratic member of the Pennsylvania State Senate.

He worked as a riverboat captain. He was a delegate to the 1876 Democratic National Convention. He represented the 46th senatorial district in the Pennsylvania State Senate from 1891 to 1894.

William B. Dunlap Mansion, his home in Bridgewater, Pennsylvania, is on the National Register of Historic Places.
