= Darlington Township, Pennsylvania =

Township in Pennsylvania, US

Coordinates: 40°49′28″N 80°27′53″W

- Township
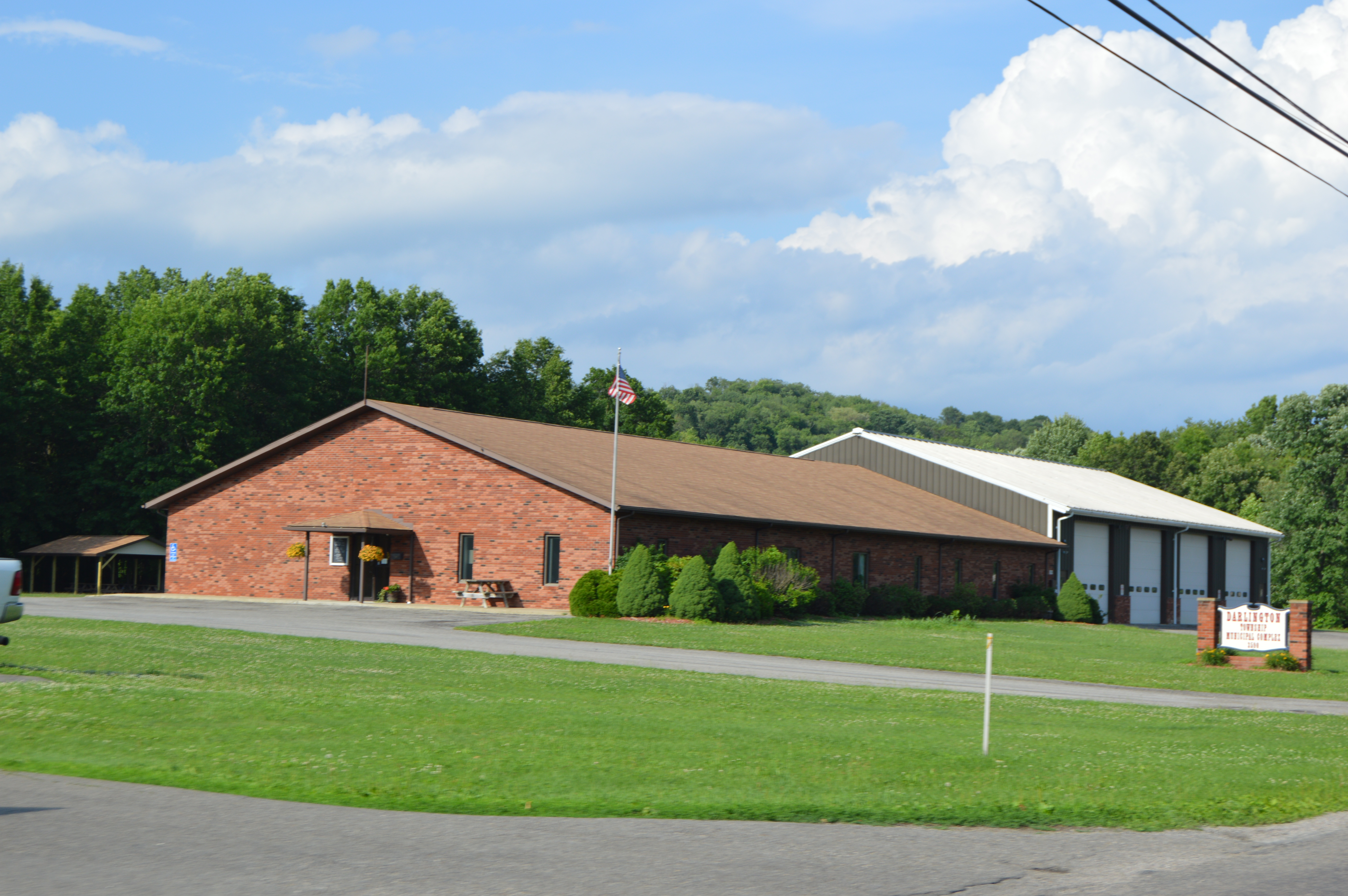
- Darlington Township Municipal Building

- Logo

- Location in Beaver County and state of Pennsylvania
- Country: United States
- State: Pennsylvania
- County: Beaver
- Incorporated: 1847

Area
  - Total: 22.05 sq mi (57.10 km^{2})
  - Land: 21.97 sq mi (56.91 km^{2})
  - Water: 0.073 sq mi (0.19 km^{2})

Population (2020)
  - Total: 1,813 ▼
  - Estimate (2022): 1,775
  - Density: 86.7/sq mi (33.49/km^{2})
- Time zone: UTC-5 (Eastern (EST))
  - Summer (DST): UTC-4 (EDT)
- FIPS code: 42-007-18200
- Website: www.darlingtontwp.com

Darlington Township is a township in Beaver County, Pennsylvania, United States. The population was 1,813 at the 2020 census. It is part of the Pittsburgh metropolitan area.

== History ==
Darlington and South Beaver townships are connected by the Watts Mill Bridge over Little Beaver Creek. The bridge is listed on the National Register of Historic Places.

== Geography ==
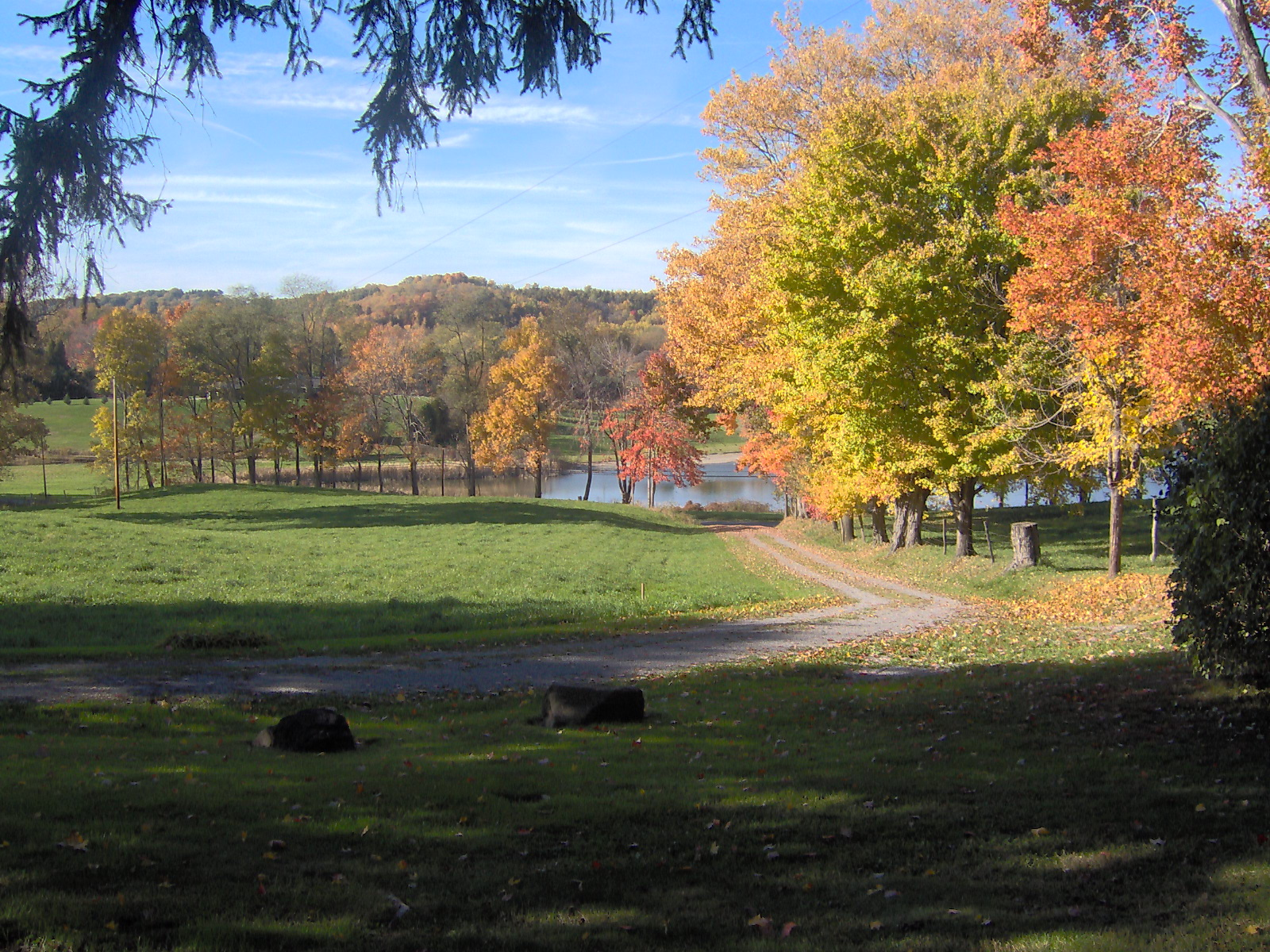
Autumn scenery in southwest Darlington Township near the borough of Darlington

According to the United States Census Bureau, the township has a total area of 22.0 square miles (57.1 km^{2}), of which 22.0 square miles (56.9 km^{2}) is land and 0.08 square miles (0.2 km^{2}), or 0.33%, is water.

=== Surrounding neighborhoods ===
Darlington Township has nine borders, including Little Beaver Township and Enon Valley (both in Lawrence County) to the north, Big Beaver and New Galilee to the east, a very small border with Chippewa Township to the southeast, South Beaver Township to the south, and the Columbiana County, Ohio townships of Middleton and Unity to the west. The borough of Darlington is situated within Darlingtown Township near the southeastern corner.

== Demographics ==
Historical population
Census	Pop.	Note	%±
1970	2,056		—
1980	2,090		1.7%
1990	2,040		−2.4%
2000	1,974		−3.2%
2010	1,962		−0.6%
2020	1,813		−7.6%
2022 (est.)	1,775		−2.1%
U.S. Decennial Census

As of the 2000 census, there were 1,974 people, 782 households, and 570 families residing in the township. The population density was 89.6 inhabitants per square mile (34.6/km^{2}). There were 847 housing units at an average density of 38.4 per square mile (14.8/km^{2}). The racial makeup of the township was 99.44% White, 0.10% African American, 0.20% Native American, and 0.25% from two or more races. Hispanic or Latino of any race were 0.15% of the population.

There were 782 households, out of which 29.2% had children under the age of 18 living with them, 58.4% were married couples living together, 9.8% had a female householder with no husband present, and 27.0% were non-families. 24.0% of all households were made up of individuals, and 10.9% had someone living alone who was 65 years of age or older. The average household size was 2.52 and the average family size was 2.95.

In the township the population was spread out, with 23.0% under the age of 18, 6.6% from 18 to 24, 29.4% from 25 to 44, 25.4% from 45 to 64, and 15.7% who were 65 years of age or older. The median age was 40 years. For every 100 females, there were 97.6 males. For every 100 females age 18 and over, there were 99.5 males.

The median income for a household in the township was $38,011, and the median income for a family was $43,875. Males had a median income of $31,815 versus $21,336 for females. The per capita income for the township was $18,173. About 8.1% of families and 10.7% of the population were below the poverty line, including 14.2% of those under age 18 and 7.4% of those age 65 or over.

== Recreation ==
Portions of the Pennsylvania State Game Lands Number 285 are located in the township.
