= Pennsylvania House of Representatives, District 15 =

American legislative district

Pennsylvania's 15th State House of Representatives district
Representative
Josh Kail; R–Beaver
- Population (2022): 66,277

The 15th Pennsylvania House of Representatives District is located in southwest Pennsylvania and has been represented by Josh Kail since 2019.

== District profile ==
The 15th District is located in Beaver County and Washington County. It includes the following areas:

Beaver County

- Beaver
- Brighton Township
- Frankfort Springs
- Georgetown
- Glasgow
- Greene Township
- Hanover Township
- Hookstown
- Independence Township
- Industry
- Midland
- Ohioville
- Potter Township
- Raccoon Township
- Shippingport
- South Beaver Township
- Vanport Township

Washington County

- Blaine Township
- Buffalo Township
- Burgettstown
- Canton Township
- Claysville
- Cross Creek Township
- Donegal Township
- Hanover Township
- Hopewell Township
- Independence Township
- Jefferson Township
- Midway
- Robinson Township
- Smith Township
- West Middletown

== Representatives ==
Representative	Party	Years	District home	Note
Before 1969, seats were apportioned by county.
Charles D. Stone	Democrat	1969 – 1972		
Robert O. Davis	Republican	1973 – 1974		
Fred R. Milanovich	Democrat	1975 – 1980		
Nick Colafella	Democrat	1981 – 2002		
Vincent A. Biancucci	Democrat	2003 – 2008	Aliquippa	Unsuccessful candidate for reelection
Jim Christiana	Republican	2009 – 2019	Beaver	Retired to run for U.S. Senate
Josh Kail	Republican	2019 – present	Beaver	Incumbent

== Recent election results ==
PA House election, 2024: Pennsylvania House, District 15
Party	Candidate	Votes	%
Republican	Josh Kail (incumbent)	24,702	68.93
Democratic	Ashlee Caul	11,135	31.07
Total votes		35,837	100.00
Republican hold			

PA House election, 2022: Pennsylvania House, District 15
Party	Candidate	Votes	%
Republican	Josh Kail (incumbent)	Unopposed	
Total votes		22,375	100.00
Republican hold			

PA House election, 2020: Pennsylvania House, District 15
Party	Candidate	Votes	%
Republican	Josh Kail (incumbent)	24,558	70.85
Democratic	Bob Williams, Sr.	10,102	29.15
Total votes		34,660	100.00
Republican hold			

PA House election, 2018: Pennsylvania House, District 15
Party	Candidate	Votes	%
Republican	Josh Kail	15,393	61.46
Democratic	Terri Mitko	9,651	38.54
Total votes		25,044	100.00
Republican hold			

PA House election, 2016: Pennsylvania House, District 15
Party	Candidate	Votes	%
Republican	Jim Christiana (incumbent)	19,248	62.97
Democratic	Mike Rossi	11,318	37.03
Total votes		30,566	100.00
Republican hold			

PA House election, 2014: Pennsylvania House, District 15
Party	Candidate	Votes	%
Republican	Jim Christiana (incumbent)	12,585	69.42
Democratic	Paul Cain	5,545	30.58
Total votes		18,130	100.00
Republican hold			

PA House election, 2012: Pennsylvania House, District 15
Party	Candidate	Votes	%
Republican	Jim Christiana (incumbent)	17,473	61.06
Democratic	Robert O. Williams	11,144	38.94
Total votes		28,617	100.00
Republican hold			

PA House election, 2010: Pennsylvania House, District 15
Party	Candidate	Votes	%
Republican	Jim Christiana (incumbent)	13,308	62.27
Democratic	Frank Bovalino	8,062	37.73
Total votes		21,370	100.00
Republican hold			
