= Charles Stone =

Charles, Charlie, or Chuck Stone may refer to:

== Law and politics ==
- Charles W. Stone (1843–1912), American politician in Pennsylvania
- Sir Charles Stone (mayor) (1850–1931), English politician
- Charles D. Stone (1920–1992), American politician in Pennsylvania
- Charlie Stone (politician) (born 1948), American politician in Florida

== Military ==
- Charles Pomeroy Stone (1824–1887), American army general
- Charles Edwin Stone (1889–1952), English soldier
- Charles B. Stone III (1904–1992), United States Air Force general
- Charles P. Stone (1915–2012), American army officer

== Sports ==
- Charles Stone (English cricketer) (1865–1951), English cricketer
- Charles Stone (New Zealand cricketer) (1866–1903), New Zealand cricketer
- Gordon Stone (rugby union) (Charles Gordon Stone, 1914–2015), Australian rugby union player
- Charlie Stone (rugby league) (1950–2018), English rugby league player

== Others ==
- Charles Stone (priest) (died 1799), Irish Anglican priest
- Charles A. Stone (1867-1941), American electrical engineer
- Chuck Stone (1924–2014), American journalist and Tuskegee Airman
- Charles Joel Stone (1936–2019), American statistician and mathematician
- Charles Stone III (born 1966), American film director

== See also ==
- Charley Stone, English multi-instrumentalist musician
