= Evalena Fryer Hedley =

American journalist and author (1865–1943)

Evalena Fryer Hedley (pen name, Grace Goodhouse; 1865–1943) was an American journalist, editor, and author of Philadelphia, Pennsylvania. In addition to serving on the editorial staff of The Saturday Evening Post, she contributed to leading journals and juvenile publications. Her compilation, Glimpses Through Life's Windows; selections from the writings of J. R. Miller, was published in 1932.

== Early life and education ==
Evalena I. Fryer was born in Chester, Pennsylvania, 1865. John Plummer and Mary (Goheen) Fryer. Hedley was a descendant of the Huguenot Vicomte Claude de Bessonett.

She was educated in the public schools, Wellesley Preparatory School of Philadelphia, and Philadelphia Normal School. She also had a music education.

== Career ==
In 1889–99, Hedley was the editor of Sabbath School Papers of the Presbyterian Board of Publications. She joined the editorial staff of The Saturday Evening Post in 1899 and remained for five years. In 1904–14, she edited the women's columns in a daily newspaper under the pen name "Grace Goodhouse". Hedley was a general writer on household topics for newspapers and a contributor to leading journals and to juvenile publications. She also gave travel talks, illustrated with stereoptican views. She was the compiler of Glimpses Through Life's Windows and the author of other works.

Hedley was the founder and president of the West Philadelphia Garden Club and Secretary-Treasurer of the Philadelphia Women's Press Association. She was a member of various societies, including the University Extension Society, Browning Society, Society of Arts and Letters, Woman Suffrage Society of Philadelphia, Huguenot Society of Pennsylvania, and Pennsylvania Society of the Daughters of the American Revolution. Hedley's club affiliations included the Philomusian, the City History, and the Women's City Club.

In 1903, she joined a party of women to visit California and the Grand Canyon in Arizona. Her interests included philanthropic work such as the Old Folks' Home and hospitals.

== Personal life ==
On June 16, 1904, she married Thomas Wilson Hedley, librarian of the Mercantile Library of Philadelphia.

In religion, she was Presbyterian.

Evalena Fryer Hedley died in Philadelphia on July 6, 1943.

== Selected works ==
- "A Modern Hero. Pathetic Story of an Irishman Who Went to His Loved Ones.", New York Independent, via The Wyandott Herald (Kansas City, Kansas, June 26, 1890)
- "Felix Birthday Party.", The Journal and Tribune (Knoxville, Tennessee, May 31, 1896) (text)
- "Washington's English Coach. by Evalena I. Fryer.", Santa Cruz Sentinel (Santa Cruz, California, February 23, 1898) (text)
- "The Crusade of the Children", The Household, via The Standard Union (Brooklyn, New York, March 4, 1899) (text)
- "How the States Were Named", The Epworth Herald, Volume 15, May 20, 1905 (text)
- Glimpses Through Life's Windows; selections from the writings of J. R. Miller (Philadelphia, The Peter Reilly Company, 1932)
