= South Side Area School District =

School district in Pennsylvania

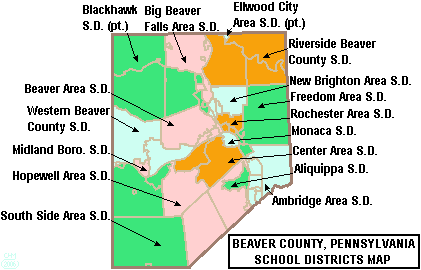

Address
- 4949 State Route 151 Hookstown, Pennsylvania, 15050; United States

District information
- Type: Public

Other information
- Website: http://www.sssd.k12.pa.us/

The South Side Area School District is a small, rural, public school district in Beaver County, Pennsylvania. The district encompasses approximately 76 square miles (200 km^{2}). It serves the boroughs of Shippingport, Hookstown, Frankfort Springs, and Georgetown, and the township of Greene Township and Hanover Township. According to 2020 federal census data, it serves a resident population of 6,143 people. In 2022, the district residents’ per capita income was $38,890, while the median family income was $83,938. In the Commonwealth, the median family income was $71,798 and the United States median family income was $74,580, in 2022.

South Side Area School District operates three schools: South Side High School (9th-12th), South Side Middle School (6th-8th), South Side Elementary School (K-5th).
