= Fred Milanovich =

American politician

Fred R. Milanovich

Member of the Pennsylvania House of Representatives from the 15th district
- In office January 7, 1975 – November 30, 1980
- Preceded by: Robert Davis
- Succeeded by: Nick Colafella

Personal details
- Born: March 3, 1915 Aliquippa, Pennsylvania
- Died: May 13, 1997 (aged 82) Sewickley, Pennsylvania
- Party: Democratic

Fred R. Milanovich (March 3, 1915 – May 13, 1997) was a Democratic member of the Pennsylvania House of Representatives.
