= Josh Kail =

American politician

Joshua Daniel Kail

Member of the Pennsylvania House of Representatives from the 15th district
- Incumbent
- Assumed office January 1, 2019
- Preceded by: Jim Christiana

Personal details
- Born: Joshua Daniel Kail; March 29, 1986 (age 40) Pittsburgh, Pennsylvania, U.S.
- Party: Republican
- Spouse: Abby
- Children: 8
- Education: Geneva College (BA); Regent University (JD)
- Occupation: Attorney

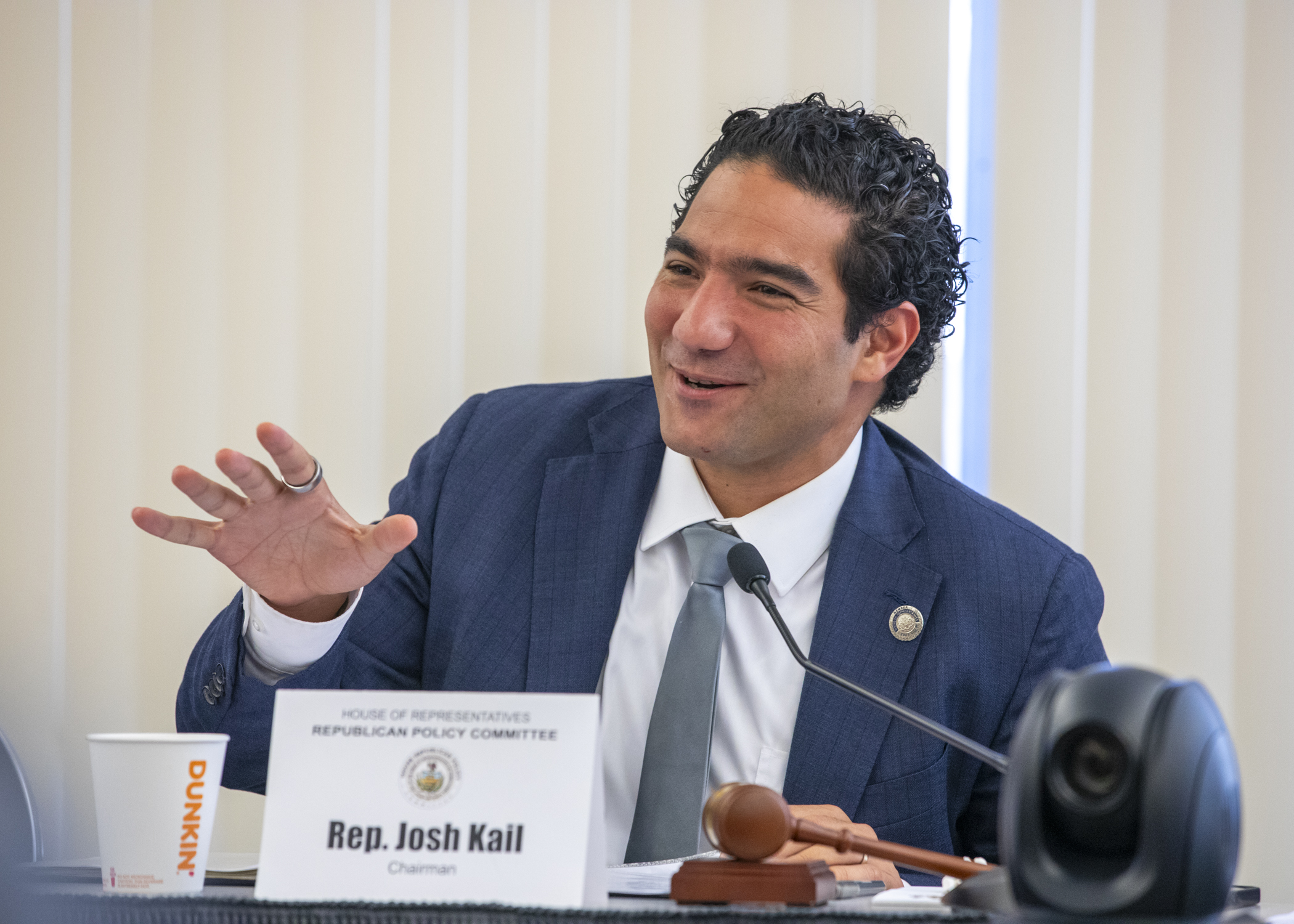
Chairman Josh Kail, "Back to School" Republican Policy Hearing at Middle Bucks Institute of Technology, August 13, 2024

Joshua Daniel Kail (born March 29, 1986) is an American politician. He is a Republican representing the 15th district in the Pennsylvania House of Representatives. He currently serves as the Chair of the Republican Policy Committee for the 2023-2024 legislative session.

== Early life ==
Kail earned a Bachelor of Arts in Political Science from Geneva College in 2008, and a JD from Regent University School of Law in 2011.

== Political career ==
In 2018, Kail ran for election to represent District 15 in the Pennsylvania House of Representatives. He was unopposed in the Republican primary, and won the general election with 61.5% of the vote. In 2020, he was re-elected with 71.7% of the vote.

=== Former Committee assignments ===
- Education
- Environmental Resources & Energy
- Judiciary
- Rules

=== Electoral record ===
2018 general election: Pennsylvania House of Representatives, District 15
Party	Candidate	Votes	%
Republican	Josh Kail	15,393	61.5%
Democratic	Terri Mitko	9,651	38.5%

2020 general election: Pennsylvania House of Representatives, District 15
Party	Candidate	Votes	%
Republican	Josh Kail	23,812	71.7%
Democratic	Robert Williams	9,405	28.3%
