= St. Luke's Anglican Church (Georgetown, Pennsylvania) =

Historic Anglican church in Georgetown, Pennsylvania, United States

Coordinates: 40°38′24″N 80°29′57″W

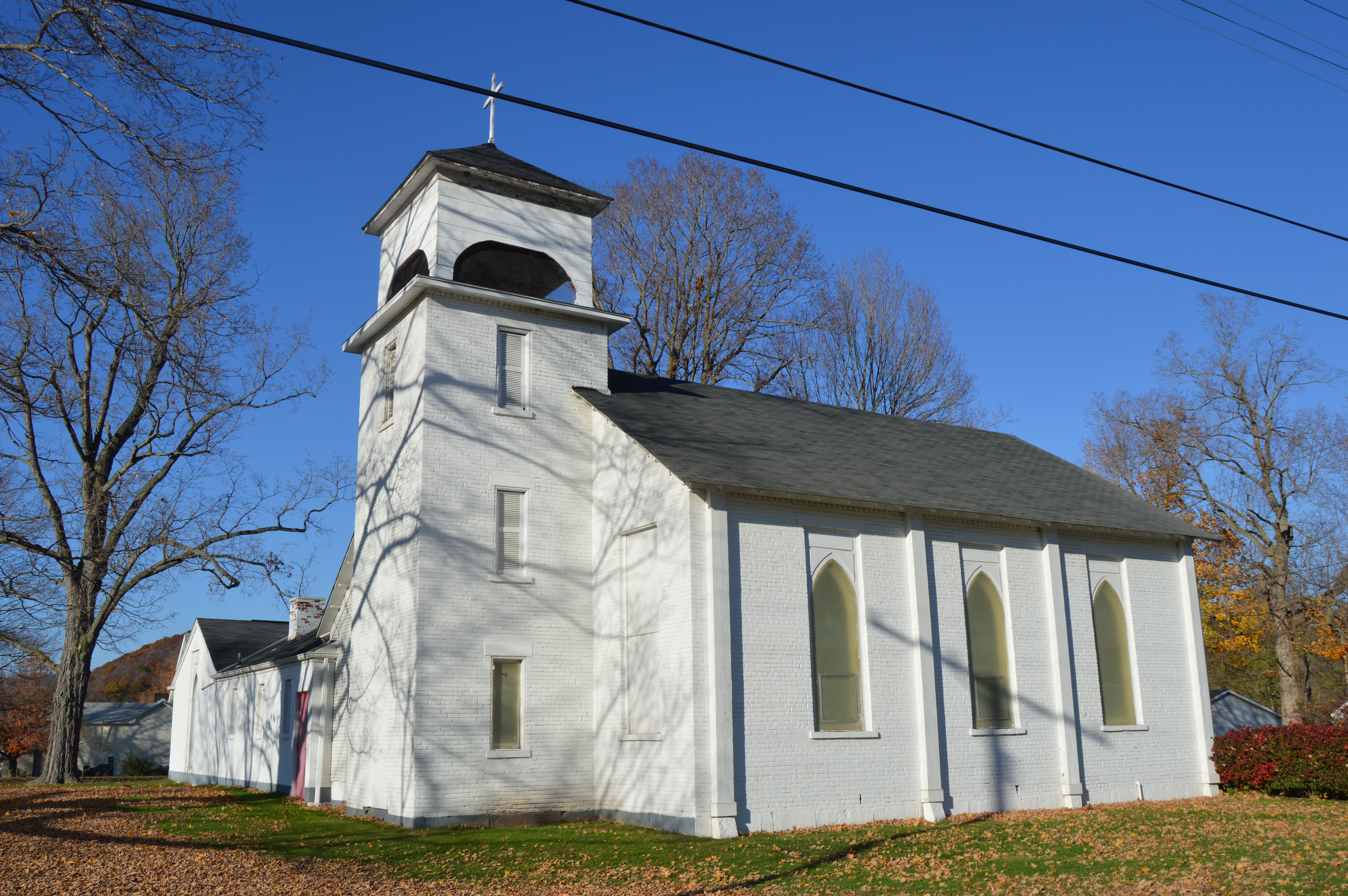
- Location: 122 Market Street, Georgetown, Beaver County, Pennsylvania
- Country: United States
- Denomination: Anglican Church in North America

History
- Founded: 1814
- Dedicated: 1852

Architecture
- Style: Gothic Revival
- Years built: 1833

Administration
- Diocese: Pittsburgh

Clergy
- Rector: The Rev. Suzanne Perkins

St. Luke's Anglican Church is a historic Anglican church in Georgetown, Beaver County, Pennsylvania. Founded in 1814 and completed in 1833, the church is the oldest building in the Anglican Diocese of Pittsburgh.

== History ==
Georgetown was first served by priests who traveled through Southwestern Pennsylvania on horseback or by river boat; early services were held on an Ohio River flat boat. St. Luke's was founded in 1814 by Episcopal priest John Taylor, who had also organized Trinity Church in Pittsburgh. Episcopal priest Francis Reno was the first Episcopal missionary to work in Beaver County, starting around 1799. After Taylor, Reno served St. Luke's as priest from 1819 to 1825. That year, Pennsylvania Bishop William White visited St. Luke's on an episcopal visit to the region.

The first St. Luke's building was a log church; the present-day brick church was built and completed in 1833 on land donated by John and Lydia Beaver, and consecrated by Bishop Alonzo Potter in 1852. A parish hall was completed in 1972.

In 2008, as part of the Anglican realignment, St. Luke's joined the majority of the Episcopal Diocese of Pittsburgh in disassociating from the Episcopal Church and forming the Anglican Diocese of Pittsburgh under Bishop Robert Duncan.

== Architecture ==
St. Luke's was built of homemade red brick. The church is three bays long, each bay originally containing a rectangular window. A steeple stands at the liturgical east end of the church.

In 1905, the church was extensively renovated. A sacristy was added, and the altar was enlarged. During the renovation, outside shutters were removed and the casements were altered to allow for stained glass lancet windows. A further renovation in 1951 saw the interior re-plastered. The exterior bricks were weatherized and painted white.

== Notable clergy ==
- William S. Thomas (priest in charge, 1927–1936), future bishop suffragan of Pittsburgh
- Walter C. Righter (priest in charge, 1951–1954), future bishop of Iowa
