= Georgetown, Beaver County, Pennsylvania =

Borough in Pennsylvania, US

Georgetown, Pennsylvania
- Borough
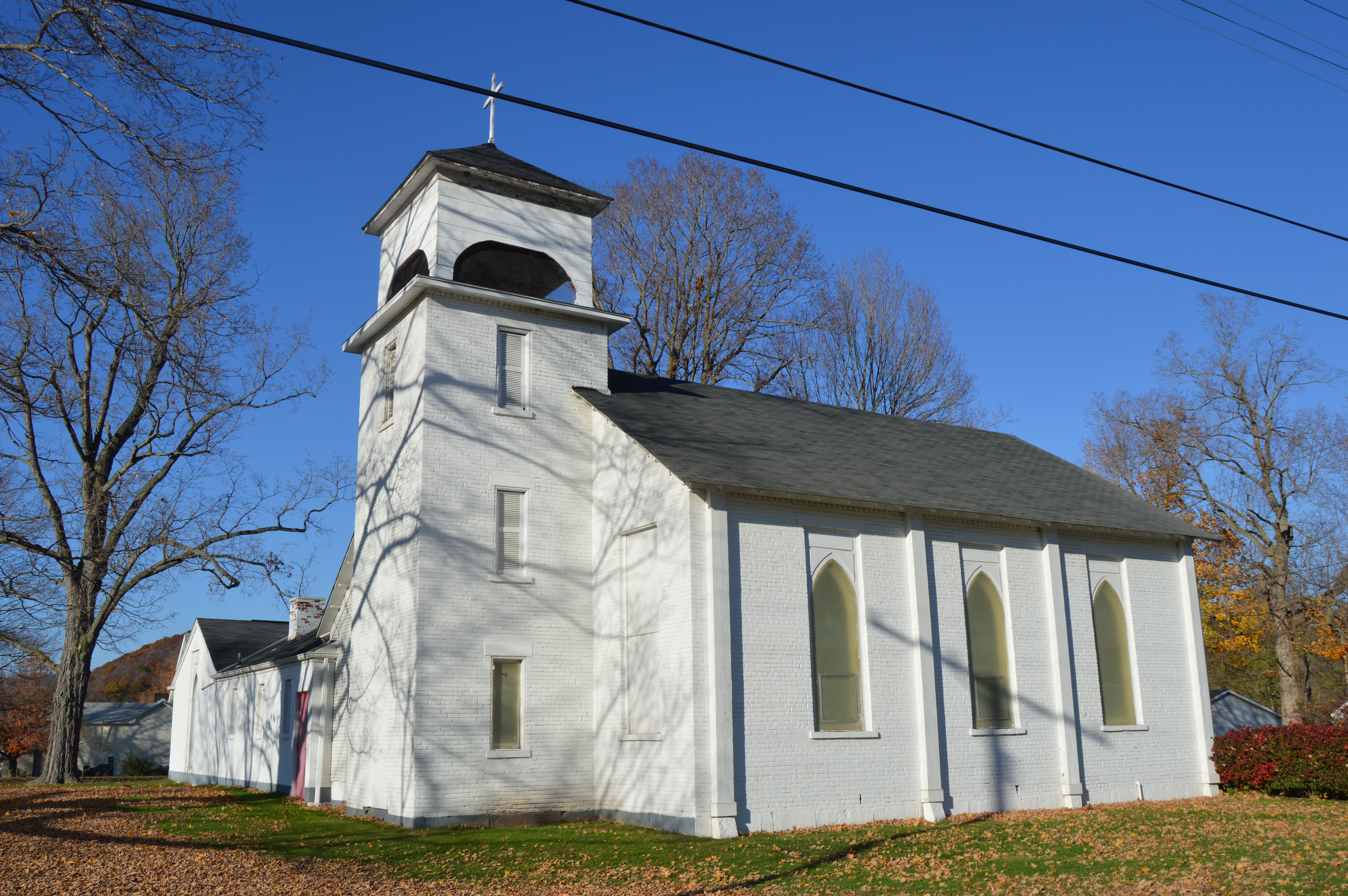
- St. Luke's Anglican Church, built 1833
- Interactive map of Georgetown, Pennsylvania
- Location within Pennsylvania Location within the United States
- Coordinates: 40°38′28″N 80°30′00″W
- Country: United States
- State: Pennsylvania
- County: Beaver
- Settled: 1793
- Incorporated: 1850

Government
  - Type: Borough Council

Area
  - Total: 0.25 sq mi (0.65 km^{2})
  - Land: 0.17 sq mi (0.45 km^{2})
  - Water: 0.077 sq mi (0.20 km^{2})
- Elevation: 741 ft (226 m)

Population (2020)
  - Total: 208
  - Density: 1,188.9/sq mi (459.05/km^{2})
- Time zone: UTC-5 (Eastern (EST))
  - Summer (DST): UTC-4 (EDT)
- Zip code: 15043
- Area code: 724
- FIPS code: 42-28824
- GNIS feature ID: 1214876

Georgetown is a borough in Beaver County, Pennsylvania, United States. It lies along the Ohio River near the state's border with West Virginia. The population was 208 at the 2020 census. It is part of the Pittsburgh metropolitan area. The U.S.'s largest coal slurry waste impound, Little Blue Run Lake, is located next to the town.

== History ==
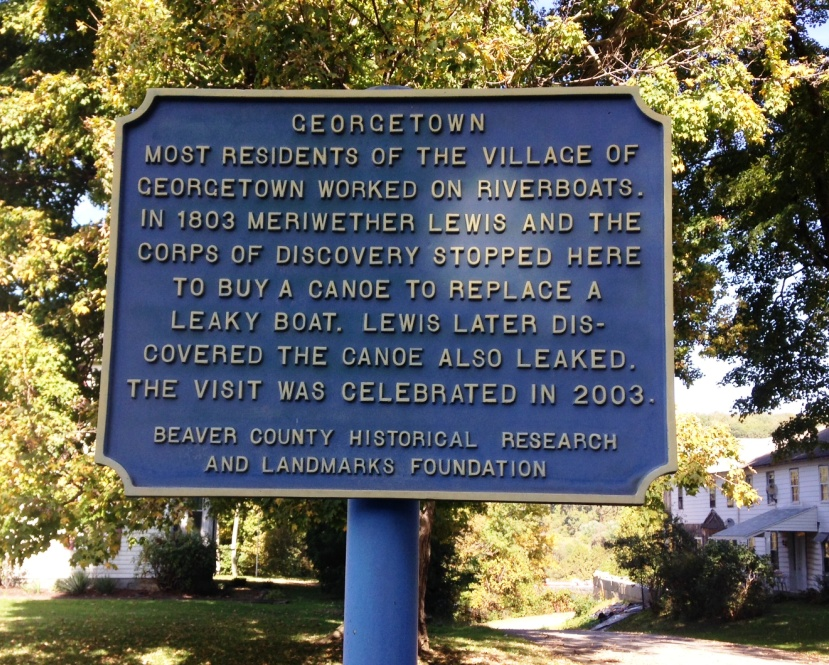
Georgetown historical marker.

The area of the Ohio headwaters was long inhabited by the Shawnee and several other groups of Native Americans. The first known Europeans to enter the region were French explorers/traders during the 17th century.

Christopher Gist was one of the first English colonists to survey the Ohio River Region around present day Pittsburgh in 1751. George Washington would also survey the area in 1753 as an envoy to demand the French to vacate the territory, which the British had claimed, as land disputes were occurring between British and French colonies at the time. Hostilities broke out in 1754 which triggered the French and Indian War.

In 1763, the region became British territory after the Treaty of Paris. The Province of Pennsylvania gained control of the land through an Indian treaty in 1768.

After the end of the American Revolutionary War in 1783, settlers began to move into western Pennsylvania, Pittsburgh and further west by way of the Ohio River. The area around Georgetown was known to riverboat travelers west of Pittsburgh as a 'last chance' stopping place for food and supplies, before entering into the roughly-charted and dangerous Northwest Territory, (there was an ongoing Indian War in the territory at the time). The closest place of protection was Ft. McIntosh, (in modern-day Beaver), about 20 miles east of the Pennsylvania border line.

The town as it is today was laid out by Benoni Dawson on January 13, 1793, and named 'Georgetown'. One theory suggests the name was bestowed in honor of George Dawson, his son. Another theory suggests the town was named in honor of the new U.S. President George Washington, who surveyed the Ohio River area years earlier. Settlement to the area was slow due to hostilities with the Native Americans until General Wayne's Treaty of Greenville in 1795. In 1800, Georgetown would be part of the newly formed Beaver County, surrounded by several townships. The first post office in Georgetown was established in 1802, including its first hotel.

In 1803, in preparation for the Lewis and Clark Expedition, Meriwether Lewis had a keelboat built near Pittsburgh, with plans to sail it down the Ohio River and meet up with William Clark in Kentucky to begin the Expedition. Lewis and his crew stopped at Georgetown to buy a canoe to replace one that was leaky. Lewis later discovered the new canoe also leaked. In 1812 the nearby Mill Creek was used to power mills to grind grain into flour. The first church was built in 1814, St. Luke's Episcopal Church. Georgetown remained a river town for keelboats and later steam boats, until the expansion of railroads and oil drilling after the Civil War.

== Geography ==
Georgetown is located at 40°38′28″N 80°30′0″W (40.641172, −80.500037).

According to the United States Census Bureau, the borough has a total area of 0.3 square miles (0.78 km^{2}), of which 0.2 square miles (0.52 km^{2}) is land and 0.1 square miles (0.26 km^{2}) (33.33%) is water.

=== Surrounding and adjacent neighborhoods ===
Georgetown has only one land border with Greene Township to the south, east and west. Across the Ohio River to the north, the borough runs adjacent with Glasgow and Ohioville.

== Demographics ==
Historical population
Census	Pop.	Note	%±
1860	295		—
1870	297		0.7%
1880	288		−3.0%
1890	274		−4.9%
1900	271		−1.1%
1910	269		−0.7%
1920	251		−6.7%
1930	260		3.6%
1940	253		−2.7%
1950	246		−2.8%
1960	246		0.0%
1970	234		−4.9%
1980	231		−1.3%
1990	194		−16.0%
2000	182		−6.2%
2010	174		−4.4%
2020	208		19.5%

As of the 2000 census, there were 182 people, 67 households, and 52 families residing in the borough. The population density was 1,010.6 inhabitants per square mile (390.2/km^{2}). There were 70 housing units at an average density of 388.7 per square mile (150.1/km^{2}). The racial makeup of the borough was 100.00% White.

There were 67 households, out of which 34.3% had children under the age of 18 living with them, 70.1% were married couples living together, 3.0% had a female householder with no husband present, and 20.9% were non-families. 16.4% of all households were made up of individuals, and 11.9% had someone living alone who was 65 years of age or older. The average household size was 2.72 and the average family size was 3.11.

In the borough, the population was spread out, with 22.0% under the age of 18, 7.7% from 18 to 24, 28.0% from 25 to 44, 25.3% from 45 to 64, and 17.0% who were 65 years of age or older. The median age was 40 years. For every 100 females, there were 122.0 males. For every 100 females age 18 and over, there were 105.8 males.

The median income for a household in the borough was $57,500, and the median income for a family was $59,167. Males had a median income of $38,750 versus $31,528 for females. The per capita income for the borough was $19,838. About 4.0% of families and 3.3% of the population were below the poverty line, including 3.7% of those under the age of 18 and none of those 65 or over.

== Industry ==
Georgetown is a rural agricultural area, just outside the major steel industries of Pittsburgh. Nevertheless, Georgetown is still close to heavy industry with potential hazards. In the 1970s the Little Blue Run Lake, the country's largest coal slurry waste impoundment, formed as a large artificial lake south-west of Georgetown (on the Pennsylvania and West Virginia state lines). Because of its large toxic pollution content, the facilities closed down in 2016.

Georgetown is a couple miles downstream from old J & L steel mills and other metal facilities such as ATI Allegheny Ludlum, Marathon Petroleum and the Beaver Valley Nuclear Power Plant.

== Education ==
Children in Georgetown are served by the South Side Area School District. The current schools serving Georgetown are:

- South Side Elementary School – grades K–5
- South Side Middle School – grades 6–8
- South Side High School – grades 9–12

== Notable people ==
- Andrew Jackson Poe, landscape artist

== See also ==
- List of cities and towns along the Ohio River
