= Robert O. Davis =

American politician

Member of the Pennsylvania House of Representatives from the 15th district
- In office 1973–1974
- Preceded by: Charles Stone
- Succeeded by: Fred Milanovich

Member of the Pennsylvania House of Representatives from the 13th district
- In office 1969–1972
- Preceded by: District Created
- Succeeded by: Earl Smith

Member of the Pennsylvania House of Representatives from the Beaver County district
- In office 1967–1968

Personal details
- Born: July 15, 1910 New Castle, Pennsylvania
- Died: July 1, 1992 (aged 81) Beaver, Pennsylvania
- Party: Republican

Robert O. Davis (July 15, 1910 – July 1, 1992) was a Republican member of the Pennsylvania House of Representatives.

== Life ==
Born in New Castle, Pennsylvania on July 15, 1910, Davis attended Pennsylvania State University, where he was a member of Sigma Pi fraternity.

He died in Beaver, Pennsylvania on July 1, 1992.
