= Jim Christiana =

American politician (born 1983)

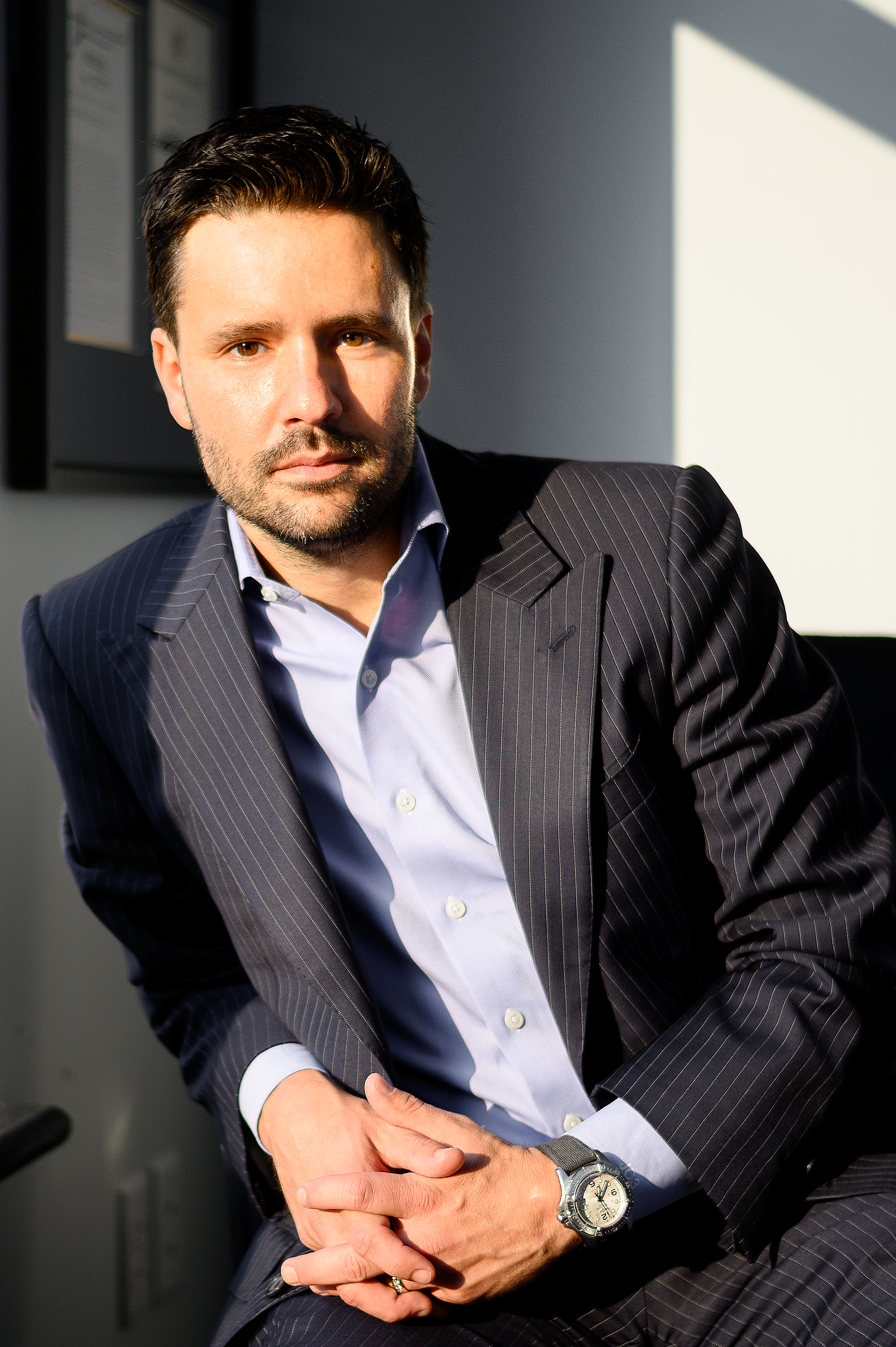

Member of the Pennsylvania House of Representatives from the 15th district
- In office January 6, 2009 – January 1, 2019
- Preceded by: Vince Biancucci
- Succeeded by: Josh Kail

Personal details
- Born: October 3, 1983 (age 42) Pittsburgh, Pennsylvania, U.S.
- Party: Republican
- Spouse: Jayann (2012–present)
- Education: Washington and Jefferson College (BA)

James J. Christiana III (born October 3, 1983) is an American politician. He served as a Republican member of the Pennsylvania House of Representatives from 2009 to 2019.

== Early life and education ==
The great-grandson of Italian immigrants, Christiana is a fourth-generation resident of Beaver County, Pennsylvania, and a member of the First Presbyterian Church in Beaver, Pennsylvania. He graduated from Beaver High School in Beaver, Pennsylvania, in 2002.

He attended Washington & Jefferson College, where he played on the men's soccer team. As a college senior in 2005, Christiana became the youngest member of the Beaver Borough Council. He graduated in 2006 with a degree in political science.

As a Republican member of the Beaver Borough Council, Christiana served as the chair of the Finance Committee.

== State House ==
In November 2008, he defeated Democratic incumbent Vince Biancucci to represent the 15th legislative district in the Pennsylvania House of Representatives.

=== Senate race ===
In April 2017, Christiana announced he was running for Republican nomination for U.S. Senate, seeking to challenge incumbent Democratic Senator Bob Casey Jr. in 2018. Christiana ran against Berwick borough councilman Andrew Shecktor and Representative Lou Barletta. He was defeated by Barletta in the primary 63 percent to 37 percent.

== Electoral history ==
15th legislative district in the Pennsylvania House of Representatives
Year	Republican	Votes	Pct	Democrat	Votes	Pct
2008	Jim Christiana	15,134	51.5	Vince Biancucci	14,280	48.5
2010	Jim Christiana	13,308	62.3	Frank Bovalino	8,062	37.7
2012	Jim Christiana	17,473	61.1	Robert Williams	11,144	38.9
2014	Jim Christiana	12,585	69.4	Paul Cain	5,545	30.6
2016	Jim Christiana	18,368	63.1	Michael Rossi	10,759	36.9

Republican primary results
Party	Candidate	Votes	%
Republican	Lou Barletta	433,312	63.03%
Republican	Jim Christiana	254,118	36.97%
Total votes		687,430	100.00%
