= Bethann Beall Faris Van Ness =

American writer (1902–1993)

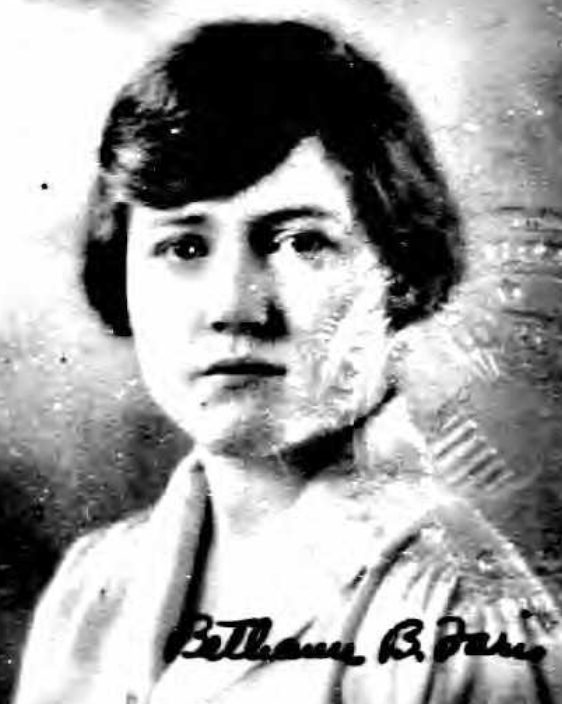
- Bethann Beall Faris, from her 1924 application for a US passport
- Born: May 26, 1902; Mount Carmel, Illinois
- Died: December 23, 1993; Rockland, Maine
- Occupation: Writer
- Parent: John Thomson Faris

Bethann Beall Faris Van Ness (May 26, 1902 – December 23, 1993) was an American writer. She wrote religious books for children, and was executive director of the YWCA in Nashville. She was also manager of the Nashville Symphony.

== Early life and education ==
Bethann Faris was born in Mount Carmel, Illinois, and raised in Philadelphia, the daughter of John Thomson Faris and Clara Carter Faris. Her father, a clergyman, wrote several books about the American West. She graduated from Wellesley College in 1924, and was a member of Phi Beta Kappa. She pursued further studies at the Tennessee School of Social Work.

== Career ==
Faris worked for the Presbyterian Sunday School Board in Philadelphia from 1924 to 1928. She moved to Nashville after she married, and worked at a publishing house there. During World War II, she wrote articles about the YWCA's war work for the Tennessee Banner.

Despite having no musical training, Van Ness was manager of the Nashville Symphony from 1953 to 1961. She was executive director of the Nashville YWCA from 1961. She was deputy commissioner of the Girl Scout Council, a charter member of the Association for the Preservation of Virginia Antiquities, active in the Red Cross, and taught Sunday School at Immanuel Baptist Church in Nashville.

== Publications ==
Van Ness wrote books for children, many of them published by the Southern Baptist Convention's Sunday School Board. Eagle Boy (1971) is about "a Tsimshian Indian boy growing up in Alaska in the 1940s".

- This is My Bible (1944)
- My Family and I (1948)
- The Talking Penny (1953)
- The Bible Story Book (1963, illustrated by Harold Minton)
- Eagle Boy (1971)
- Bible Stories for Children (audio recordings, 1976)

== Personal life ==
Bethann Faris married Noble Van Ness in 1928; he was an editor and manager at the Baptist Sunday School Board. They had three children. The Van Nesses retired to Vinalhaven, Maine in 1965. Her husband died in 1976, and she died in 1993, in Rockland, Maine, aged 91 years.
