= South Side High School (Hookstown, Pennsylvania) =

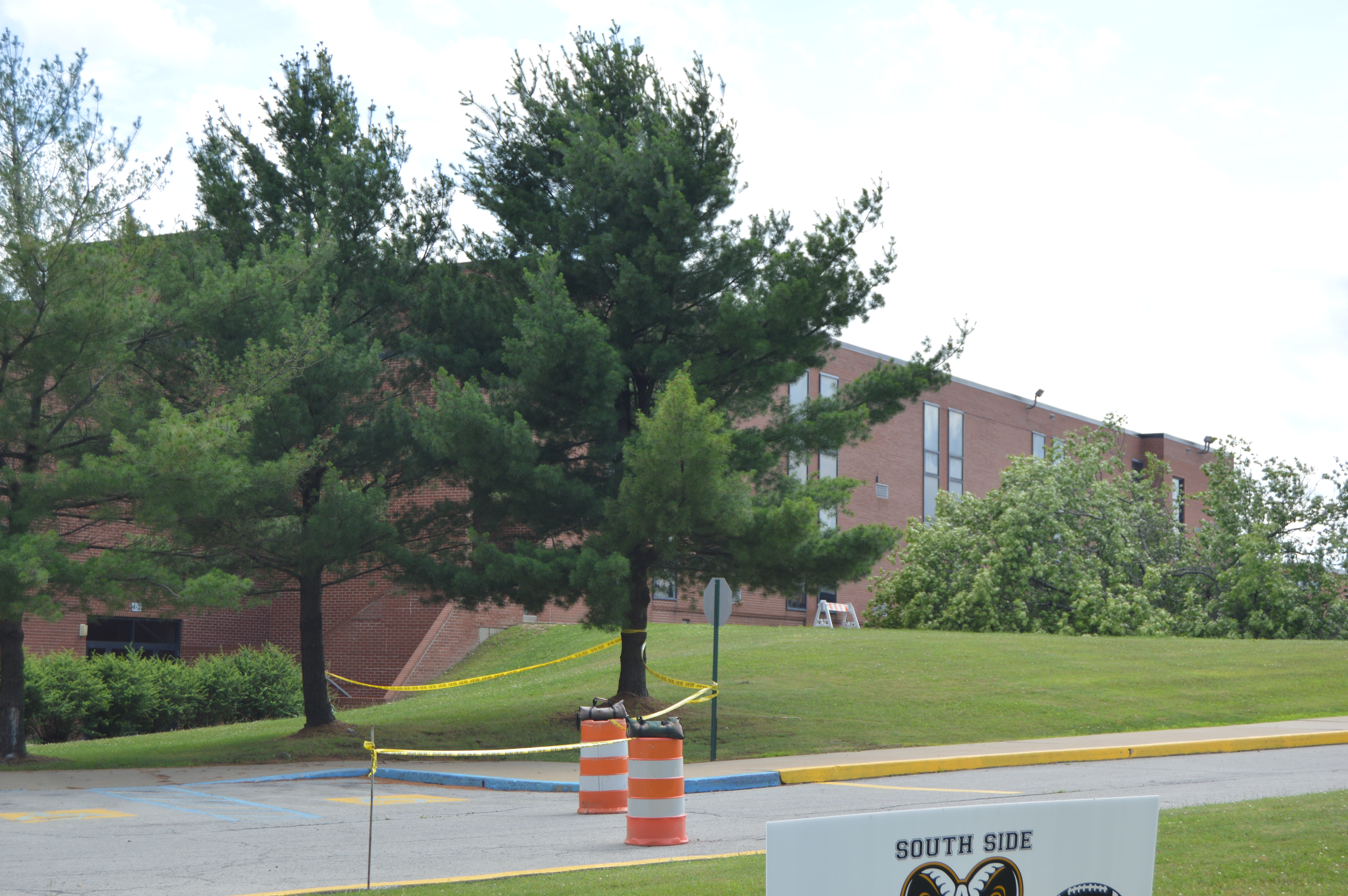
- The South Side High School building in Hookstown, PA

Location
- 4949 State Route 151; Hookstown, Pennsylvania 15050; United States; 40.5682°N 80.4369°W

Information
- Type: Public, Coeducational high school
- Established: 10 November 1957; 68 years ago
- School district: South Side Area School District
- Superintendent: Alan Fritz Jr.
- CEEB code: 391823
- NCES School ID: 422223000714
- Dean: Luke Travelpiece
- Principal: Lora Batchelor
- Grades: 9-12
- Enrollment: 272 (2024-25)
- Student to teacher ratio: 11.45
- Colors: Black, White
- Athletics conference: Western Pennsylvania Interscholastic Athletic League
- Sports: Football, Soccer, Golf, Volleyball, Baseball
- Mascot: Rams
- Team name: Rams
- Rival: Rochester Area High School
- Yearbook: The Rambler
- Website: www.sssd.k12.pa.us

South Side High School is a public high school in Greene Township, Pennsylvania, United States. South Side provides secondary education for students in grades 9 through 12 and is the only high school in the South Side Area School District. Prior to the district's formation in 1969, the high school was initially part of the Southern Beaver County School District, a joint school district established in 1950 by five municipalities (Frankfort Springs Borough, Greene Township, Hanover Township, Hookstown Borough, and Shippingport Borough.)

== History ==
=== Campus ===
In 1954, while the adjacent elementary school was being constructed, work on the high school also began, and it opened in the fall of 1957. The original building consisted of 12 classrooms and underwent continuous expansion starting in 1965.

In 1965, the first addition was completed, adding 13 classrooms, 4 restrooms, and a library.

In 1975, a two-story addition was built, providing 11 classrooms, a gymnasium, locker rooms, an elevator, and additional storage and miscellaneous spaces.

In 1991, two additional storage units were added to the southeastern side of the building. This expansion also included a new office area, 9 classrooms, a high school gymnasium, locker rooms, music, choir, and school band rooms, 4 restrooms, and other miscellaneous spaces.

In 1994, minor renovations were made to the second-floor science labs.

In 2013, additions and renovations were performed. These included an enlargement of the kitchen area, renovations to the main entrance, cafeteria, half of the office area, 4 restrooms, and modifications to incorporate a multi-purpose room and locker rooms. As part of the improvements, the roof was replaced throughout the entire school.

In 2014, further renovations were made to the second half of the Middle/High School Administration Office, the student entrance, the hallway between the main entrance and the student entrances, a new fire alarm system, and a new high-voltage electrical distribution system.

=== Tractor Day ===
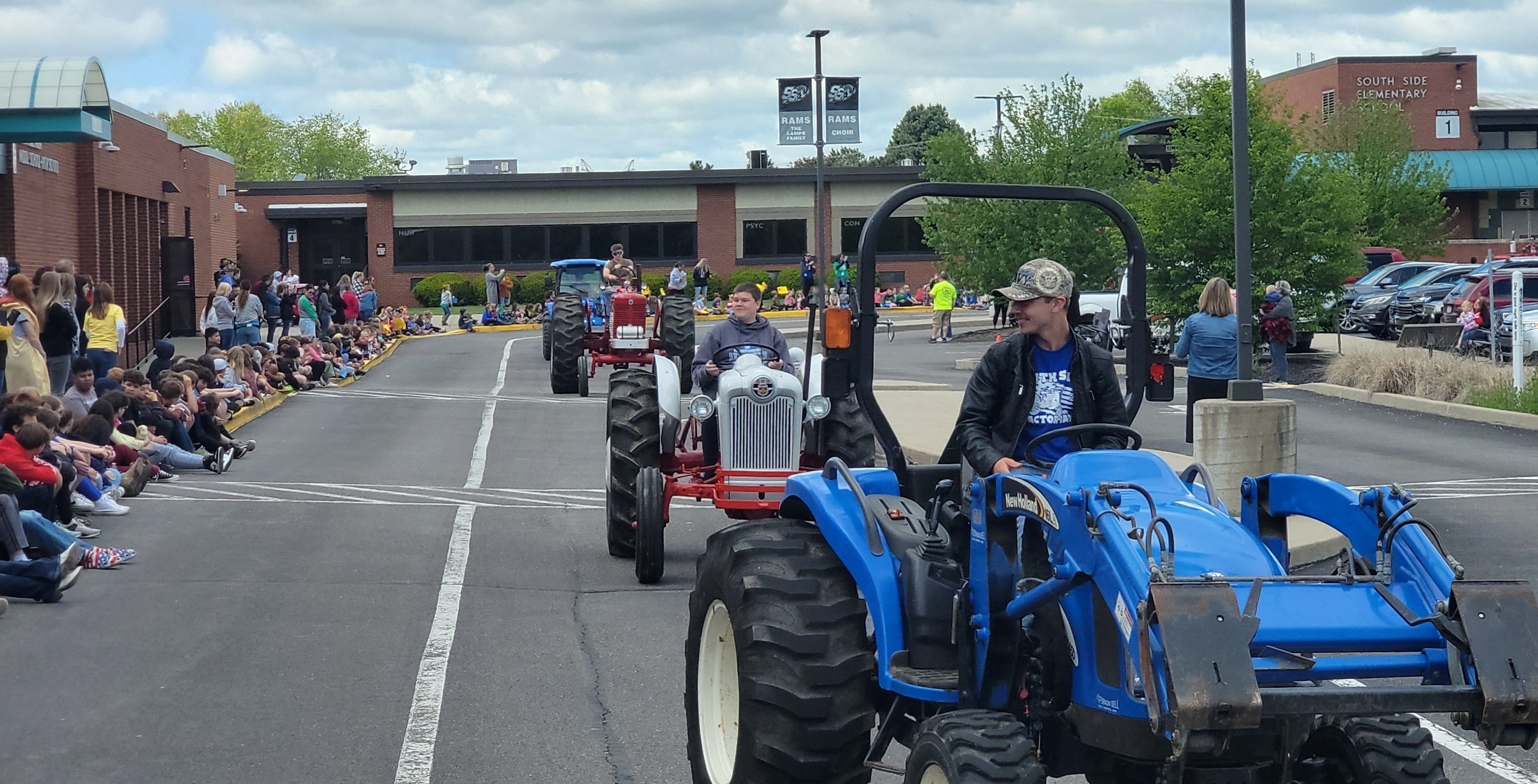
The South Side students ride tractors shortly before prom later that day

Tractor Day is an annual parade held within the school district, where students drive their tractors to school in celebration of Prom Day. The event typically features a procession of tractors arriving in the north parking lot in the late morning. After arriving, the students parade their tractors around the parking lot before driving home and then to prom.

Tractor Day began sometime in the late 1980s, though its exact beginnings are unclear. Various stories are circulated about how the tradition initially began, but the most widely accepted version details that a small group of students chose to ride their tractors to school on the day of prom, leading to the start of the tradition.

=== Principals ===
- Nandor A. Hrutkay, 1957–1961
- Charles P. Henderson, 1961–1966
- Andrew Campbell, 1966–1968
- William Kerr, 1968–1974
- William Edgar, 1974–1992
- William Suit, 1992–1996
- William Edgar, 1996–1997
- Thomas Salvati, 1997–2003
- Vincent Trombetta, 2003–2010
- Anthony Paull, 2010–2021
- Matthew Tumulty, 2021–2023
- Lora Batchelor, 2023–Present

== Extracurricular activities ==
=== Athletics ===
Athletic teams compete as the South Side Rams in the Western Pennsylvania Interscholastic Athletic League (WPIAL).

==== Football ====
The South Side Rams football team compete in the Western Pennsylvania Interscholastic Athletic League (WPIAL) Class 1A. The football team has won one state championship title in 1999 along with two WPIAL championship titles in 1970 and 1999. The teams last appearance in state championships was in 2018 where they reached the quarterfinals before being eliminated by Steel Valley 48–6. The team has also been runner-up in WPIAL championships two times, in 1991 and 2023. Their most recent playoff appearance was in 2023, where they advanced to the quarterfinals after defeating Clairton 28–12, before being eliminated by Fort Cherry 28–42. During the 2023 season, the South Side Rams achieved an overall record of 14–1, including a perfect 6–0 record in conference play.

==== Track and field ====
South Side track teams compete in the Western Pennsylvania Interscholastic Athletic League (WPIAL) Class 2A. The track team won its sole WPIAL championship title in 2006.

=== Academic Competition ===
The school fields a Quiz Bowl team under the name "South Side High School," often referred to simply as "South Side" and officially nicknamed the "Rams." The team has routinely performed well in National Academic Quiz Tournaments (NAQT) in the Greater Pittsburgh Area. The team has qualified for and competed in eight Small School National Championship Tournaments (SSNCT) since 2016, achieving its best finish in 2024 by placing 8th overall with a 12–3 record and a total score of 5,170 points across all games—the best showing among nine other Pennsylvania schools that year.

South Side's Quiz Bowl team has also appeared on CBS Pittsburgh's KD Quiz, winning the competition in 2024.
