= Vincent A. Biancucci =

American politician

Member of the Pennsylvania House of Representatives from the 15th district
- In office January 7, 2003 – November 30, 2008
- Preceded by: Nick Colafella
- Succeeded by: Jim Christiana

Personal details
- Born: September 24, 1940 Aliquippa, Pennsylvania
- Died: November 24, 2018 (aged 78) Baden, Pennsylvania
- Party: Democratic
- Spouse: Marilyn Biancucci
- Education: Youngstown State University

Vincent A. Biancucci (September 24, 1940 – November 24, 2018) was a Democratic member of the Pennsylvania House of Representatives for the 15th District and was elected in 2002.

He was defeated for re-election in the 2008 general election. He died in 2018.
