= J. R. Miller =

American writer and pastor (1840–1912)

James Russell Miller
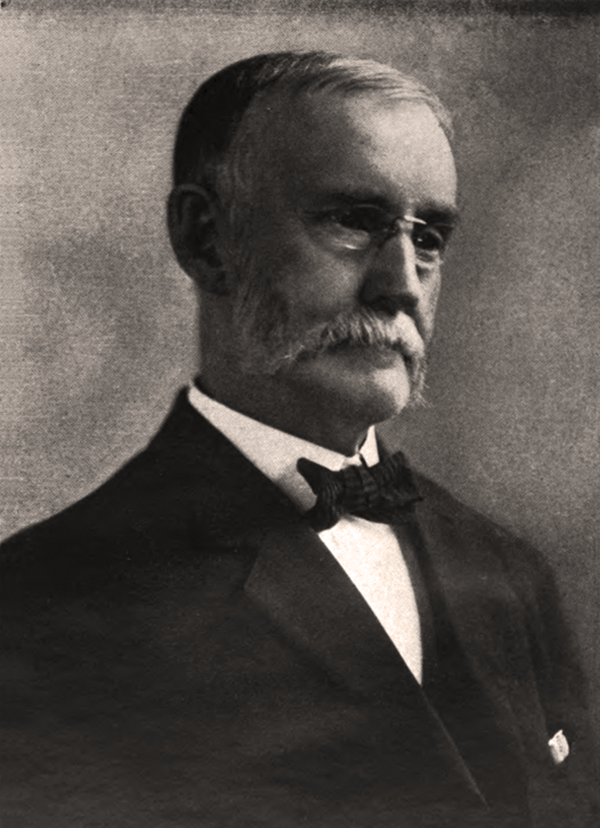

Personal life
- Born: 20 March 1840 near Frankfort Springs, Pennsylvania
- Died: 2 July 1912 (aged 72) Philadelphia, Pennsylvania
- Spouse: Louise E. King
- Children: 3

Religious life
- Religion: Christian
- Denomination: Presbyterian
- Church: Presbyterian Church (U.S.A.)
- Profession: Author, editor

Senior posting
- Post: Pastor

James Russell Miller (20 March 1840 – 2 July 1912) was a popular Christian author, Editorial Superintendent of the Presbyterian Board of Publication, and pastor of several churches in Pennsylvania and Illinois.

== Early years ==
James Russell Miller was born near Frankfort Springs, Pennsylvania, on the banks of the Big Traverse, which according to his biographer, John T. Faris, is a merry little mill stream which drains one of the most beautiful valleys in the southern part of Beaver County. His parents were James Alexander Miller and Eleanor Creswell who were of Irish and Scottish origin.

Miller was the second child of ten, but his older sister died before he was born. James and his sisters attended the district school in Hanover Township, Beaver County, Pennsylvania until, when James was about fourteen, his father moved to a farm near Calcutta, Ohio. The children then went to the district school during the short winters and worked on the farm during summer.

In 1857, James entered Parsonsfield Seminary and in 1862 he progressed to Westminster College, Pennsylvania, from which he was graduated in June 1862. Then in the autumn of that year he entered the theological seminary of the United Presbyterian Church at Allegheny, Pennsylvania.

== The Christian Commission ==
The Christian Commission was created in response to the disastrous First Battle of Bull Run. On 14 November 1861, the National Committee of the Young Men's Christian Association (YMCA) called a convention which met in New York City. The work of the United States Christian Commission was outlined and the organization completed the next day.

In March 1863, Miller promised to serve for six weeks as a delegate of the United States Christian Commission, but at the end of this time he was persuaded to become an Assistant Field Agent and later he was promoted to General Field Agent. He left the Commission on 15 July 1865.

== The Pastorate ==
Miller resumed his interrupted studies at the Allegheny Theological Seminary in the fall of 1865 and completed them in the spring of 1867. That summer he accepted a call from the First United Presbyterian Church of New Wilmington, Pennsylvania. He was ordained and installed on 11 September 1867.

Miller held firmly to the great body of truth professed by the United Presbyterian Church, in which he had been reared, but he did not like the rule requiring the exclusive singing of the Psalms, and he felt that it was not honest for him to profess this as one of the articles of his Christian belief. He therefore resigned from his pastorate to seek membership in the Presbyterian Church (USA). In his two years as pastor, nearly two hundred names were added to the church roll.

The Old and New School Presbyterian Churches were reunited as the Presbyterian Church (USA) on 12 November 1869, and Miller became pastor of the Bethany Presbyterian Church of Philadelphia just nine days later. When he became pastor at Bethany the membership was seventy five and when he resigned in 1878 Bethany was the largest Presbyterian church in Philadelphia, having about twelve hundred members.

Miller then accepted the pastorate of the New Broadway Presbyterian Church of Rock Island, Illinois.

In 1880, Westminster College, his Alma mater conferred on him the degree of Doctor of Divinity and later in the same year came the invitation to undertake editorial work for the Presbyterian Board of Publication in Philadelphia. Hence, Miller had to resign the Rock Island, Illinois pastorate.

In Philadelphia, Miller became interested in the Hollond Mission and eventually became its pastor. During the sixteen months of the pastorate the church membership grew from 259 to 1,164 and Sunday School membership climbed from 1,024 to 1,475.

On 29 October 1899, St. Paul Church in West Philadelphia was organized with sixty-six members. Miller was chosen temporary supply and became pastor in 1906. Miller remained pastor until the year of his death, 1912. The church at that time had 1,397 members.

== Family ==
On 22 June 1870, Miller married Miss Louise E. King of Argyle, New York, whom he had met two years earlier. They had three children,

- William King,
- Russel King, a fairly well known music teacher and composer, and
- Mary Wannamker Miller who married W.B. Mount.

== Editor and author ==
Miller began contributing articles to religious papers while at Allegheny Seminary. This continued while he was at the First United, Bethany, and New Broadway churches. In 1875, Miller took over from Henry C. McCook, D.D. when the latter discontinued his weekly articles in The Presbyterian, which was published in Philadelphia.

Five years later, in 1880, Miller became assistant to the Editorial Secretary at the Presbyterian Board of Publication, also in Philadelphia.

When Dr. Miller joined the Board its only periodicals were

- The Westminster Teacher
- The Westminster Lesson Leaf
- The Senior Quarterly
- The Sabbath School Visitor
- The Sunbeam
- The Presbyterian Monthly Record

During his tenure at the board the following periodicals were added:

- The Junior Lesson Leaf in 1881
- The German Lesson Leaf in 1881
- Forward in 1882
- The Morning Star in 1883
- The Junior Quarterly in 1885
- The Lesson Card circa in 1894
- The Intermediate Quarterly circa 1895
- The Question Leaf circa 1996
- The Blackboard circa 1898
- The Home Department Quarterly in 1899
- The Primary Quarterly in 1901
- The Normal Quarterly in 1902
- The Bible Roll in 1902
- The Beginners Lessons (forerunner of The Graded Lessons) in 1903
- The Primary Teacher in 1906
- The Graded Lessons from 1909 to 1912
  - for Beginners
  - Primary
  - Junior
  - Intermediate
  - Senior
- The Westminster Adult Bible Class in 1909

The Sabbath School Visitor — the Board's oldest periodical — became The Comrade in 1909.

From 1880, when Miller first joined the Board to 1911, when he effectively retired because of ill health, the total annual circulation grew from 9,256,386 copies to 66,248,215 copies.

Miller's first book, Week Day Religion, was published by the board in 1880, the year he joined the Board.

== Books ==
Miller's lasting fame is through his books. Many are still in publication.

John T. Faris provides the following Bibliography.

- Week Day Religion, 1880
- Home Making, 1882 (currently published by The Vision Forum as The Family)
- In His Steps: For Those Beginning the Christian Life, 1885
- The Wedded Life, 1886
- Silent Times, 1886
- Come Ye Apart, 1887
- The Marriage Altar, 1888
- Practical Religion, 1888
- Bits of Pasture, 1890
- Making the Most of Life, 1891
- The Everyday of Life, 1892
- Girls: Faults and Ideals, 1892
- Young Men: Faults and Ideals, 1893
- Glimpses Through Life's Windows, 1893
- The Building of Character, 1894
- Secrets of Happy Home Life, 1894
- Life’s Byways and Waysides, 1895
- For a Busy Day, 1895
- Year Book, 1895
- Family Prayers, 1895
- The Hidden Life, 1895
- The Blessing of Cheerfulness, 1896
- Things to Live For, 1896
- Story of A Busy Life, 1896
- A Gentle Heart, 1896
- Personal Friendships of Jesus, 1897
- By the Still Waters, 1897
- The Secret of Gladness, 1898
- The Joy of Service, 1898
- The Master’s Blessed, 1898
- Young People’s Problems, 1898
- Unto the Hill, 1899
- Strength and Beauty, 1899
- The Golden Gate of Prayer, 1900
- Loving My Neighbour, 1900
- The Ministry of Comfort, 1901
- Summer Gathering, 1901
- How? When? Where?, 1901
- The Upper Currents, 1902
- Today and Tomorrow, 1902
- In Perfect Peace, 1902
- The Lesson of Love, 1903
- The Face of the Master, 1903
- Our New Eden, 1904
- Finding the Way, 1904
- The Inner Life, 1904
- Manual for Communicant Classes, 1905
- The Beauty of Kindness, 1905
- When the Song Begins, 1905
- The Best Things, 1907
- Glimpses of the Heavenly Life, 1907
- Morning Thoughts for Every Day in The Year, 1907
- Evening Thoughts, 1908
- The Gate Beautiful, 1909
- The Master's Friendships, 1909
- The Beauty of Every Day, 1910
- The Beauty of Self Control, 1911
- Learning to Love, 1911
- The Book of Comfort, 1912
- The Joy of The Lord, 1912
- Devotional Hours with the Bible (eight volumes), 1909-1913

This list is incomplete; it captures only a few of Miller pamphlets, of which there are several dozen. Some publications have alternative titles (e.g. one of Miller's best selling works, Bits of Pasture was renamed In Green Pastures).

Other books known to exist are:

- The Garden of the Heart (Hodder and Stoughton, 1910, copyright 1906)
- The Pathos of Divine Love, 1906

According to biographer John Thomson Faris, Miller sold over two million copies of his books during his lifetime.

== Archival collections ==
The Presbyterian Historical Society in Philadelphia, Pennsylvania, has J.R. Miller's papers including materials from the United States Christian Commission, sermons, and a scrapbook of his articles.
