= Earl H. Smith =

American politician (1909–1987)

Member of the Pennsylvania House of Representatives from the 13th district
- In office January 2, 1973 – November 30, 1982
- Preceded by: Robert Davis
- Succeeded by: Art Hershey

Personal details
- Born: June 8, 1909 West Caln Township, Pennsylvania
- Died: June 15, 1987 (aged 78) Caln Township, Pennsylvania
- Party: Republican

Earl H. Smith (June 8, 1909 – June 15, 1987) was a Republican member of the Pennsylvania House of Representatives.
