= Nick Colafella =

American politician

Nicholas A. Colafella

Member of the Pennsylvania House of Representatives from the 15th district
- In office January 6, 1981 – November 30, 2002
- Preceded by: Fred Milanovich
- Succeeded by: Vincent Biancucci

Personal details
- Born: January 13, 1939 (age 87) West Aliquippa, Pennsylvania
- Party: Democratic
- Spouse: Frances
- Education: Youngstown University; Duquesne University; University of Pittsburgh

Nicholas A. Colafella (born January 13, 1939) is a former Democratic member of the Pennsylvania House of Representatives.

He is a 1956 graduate of Aliquippa High School. He earned a degree in education from Youngstown University in 1962, an M.Ed. from Duquesne University in 1965, and a Ph.D. in higher education from the University of Pittsburgh.

Prior to elective office, he served as a dean at the Community College of Beaver County. In 1978, he unsuccessfully sought the Democratic nomination for Pennsylvania's 25th congressional district. He was first elected to represent the 15th legislative district in the Pennsylvania House of Representatives in 1980, a position he held until his retirement in 2002.

He was named to the Pennsylvania State Ethics Commission in 2004.
