= Ohioville, Pennsylvania =

Borough in Pennsylvania, US

- Borough
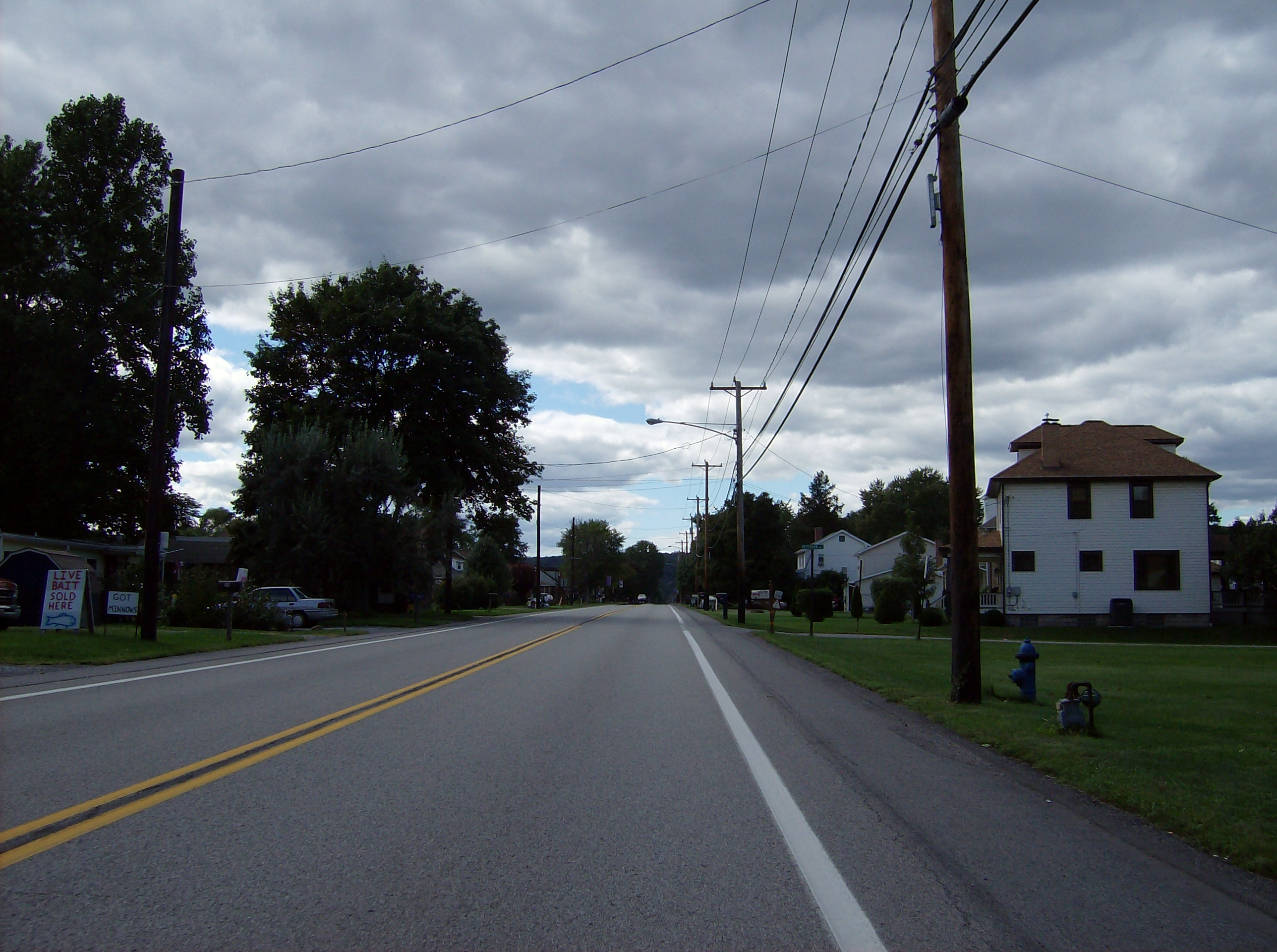
- Along Pennsylvania Route 68 in eastern Ohioville
- Interactive map of Ohioville, Pennsylvania
- Location within Pennsylvania Location within the United States
- Coordinates: 40°40′46″N 80°28′17″W
- Country: United States
- State: Pennsylvania
- County: Beaver
- Settled: 1790
- Incorporated: 1860

Government
  - Type: Borough Council

Area
  - Total: 23.69 sq mi (61.36 km^{2})
  - Land: 23.34 sq mi (60.44 km^{2})
  - Water: 0.36 sq mi (0.92 km^{2})
- Elevation: 1,253 ft (382 m)

Population (2020)
  - Total: 3,349
  - Density: 143.5/sq mi (55.41/km^{2})
- Time zone: UTC-5 (Eastern (EST))
  - Summer (DST): UTC-4 (EDT)
- Area code: 724
- FIPS code: 42-56432
- Website: ohiovilleboro.org

Ohioville is a borough in western Beaver County, Pennsylvania, United States. The population was 3,349 at the 2020 census. It is part of the Pittsburgh metropolitan area.

== History ==
Ohioville was originally Ohio Township, formed in 1805 from parts of South Beaver Township. The region had, in years past, been home to numerous tribes of Native Americans, most notably the Archaic and Woodland periods, which is shown by Iroquoian extraction. Prior to William Penn's arrival in eastern Pennsylvania, the Iroquois tribe of the Five Nations used the region for hunting.

Ohio Township was once home to a ferry run by Maryland native Thomas Smith. This ferry transported passengers from the north side of the Ohio to the south, and back again. Near the ferry, a spring of "bituminous oil" arose that would play a crucial role in the township's development. At one time there were also several Indian pictographs. (These are currently underwater.)

=== Early communities ===
Blackhawk village was a small community on the South Beaver Township line. Its first post office was established sometime after 1837. Even earlier, the New Salem United Presbyterian Church was established circa 1798, around the same time as Big Beaver's Mount Pleasant Church.

In 1811, Four Mile United Presbyterian Church was founded. Located on Tuscarawas Road (whose name derives from the old Tuscarora hunting trail), the church was originally named Four Mile Square Church.

In 1816, Ohio Township lost some of its territory to Brighton Township. With the establishment of Glasgow Borough (1854), Industry Township (1856), and Midland Borough (1906), even more land was lost.

In 1960, to prevent further land from being annexed by encroaching boroughs, Ohio Township was incorporated as Ohioville Borough.

== Geography ==
Ohioville is located in western Beaver County at 40°40′46″N 80°28′17″W (40.679398, −80.471512), in part along the Ohio River.

Pennsylvania Route 168 is the main road through the township, running south into Midland and north to Darlington and New Galilee. Pennsylvania Route 68 runs along the Ohio River in the southern part of the borough, between Midland to the east and Glasgow, Pennsylvania, and East Liverpool, Ohio, to the west.

According to the United States Census Bureau, the borough has a total area of 23.7 square miles (61.4 km^{2}), of which 23.3 square miles (60.4 km^{2}) is land and 0.35 square miles (0.9 km^{2}), or 1.50%, is water.

=== Surrounding neighborhoods ===
Ohioville has nine land borders, including South Beaver Township to the north, Brighton Township to the east, Industry to the southeast, Midland to the south Glasgow to the south-southwest, and the Columbiana County, Ohio, neighborhoods of East Liverpool and Liverpool Township to the southwest, St. Clair Township to the west, and Middleton Township to the northwest.

Across the Ohio River to the south, Ohioville runs adjacent with the Georgetown and Greene townships.

== Recreation ==
Most of Pennsylvania State Game Lands Number 173 is located in Ohioville.

== Demographics ==
Historical population
Census	Pop.	Note	%±
1970	3,918		—
1980	4,217		7.6%
1990	3,865		−8.3%
2000	3,759		−2.7%
2010	3,533		−6.0%
2020	3,349		−5.2%
2021 (est.)	3,317	▼	−1.0%

=== 2020 census ===
As of the 2020 census, Ohioville had a population of 3,349. The median age was 47.5 years. 17.7% of residents were under the age of 18 and 22.6% of residents were 65 years of age or older. For every 100 females there were 103.2 males, and for every 100 females age 18 and over there were 99.0 males age 18 and over.

0.0% of residents lived in urban areas, while 100.0% lived in rural areas.

There were 1,396 households in Ohioville, of which 24.6% had children under the age of 18 living in them. Of all households, 57.0% were married-couple households, 16.5% were households with a male householder and no spouse or partner present, and 19.2% were households with a female householder and no spouse or partner present. About 22.8% of all households were made up of individuals and 11.3% had someone living alone who was 65 years of age or older.

There were 1,503 housing units, of which 7.1% were vacant. The homeowner vacancy rate was 1.7% and the rental vacancy rate was 7.5%.

Racial composition as of the 2020 census
Race	Number	Percent
White	3,110	92.9%
Black or African American	37	1.1%
American Indian and Alaska Native	5	0.1%
Asian	9	0.3%
Native Hawaiian and Other Pacific Islander	5	0.1%
Some other race	14	0.4%
Two or more races	169	5.0%
Hispanic or Latino (of any race)	66	2.0%

=== 2000 census ===
As of the 2000 census, there were 3,759 people, 1,371 households, and 1,095 families residing in the borough. The population density was 160.9 inhabitants per square mile (62.1/km^{2}). There were 1,439 housing units at an average density of 61.6 per square mile (23.8/km^{2}). The racial makeup of the borough was 97.15% White, 2.00% African American, 0.03% Native American, 0.08% Asian, 0.24% from other races, and 0.51% from two or more races. Hispanic or Latino of any race were 0.80% of the population.

There were 1,371 households, out of which 34.2% had children under the age of 18 living with them, 66.8% were married couples living together, 9.0% had a female householder with no husband present, and 20.1% were non-families. 17.2% of all households were made up of individuals, and 9.2% had someone living alone who was 65 years of age or older. The average household size was 2.70 and the average family size was 3.04.

In the borough, the population was spread out, with 25.0% under the age of 18, 6.7% from 18 to 24, 27.5% from 25 to 44, 26.3% from 45 to 64, and 14.5% who were 65 years of age or older. The median age was 40 years. For every 100 females, there were 97.1 males. For every 100 females age 18 and over, there were 96.4 males.

The median income for a household in the borough was $39,962, and the median income for a family was $48,995. Males had a median income of $36,146 versus $22,324 for females. The per capita income for the borough was $17,837. About 2.9% of families and 5.5% of the population were below the poverty line, including 8.6% of those under age 18 and 3.0% of those age 65 or over.

== See also ==
- List of cities and towns along the Ohio River
