= Glasgow, Pennsylvania =

Borough in Pennsylvania, US

- Borough
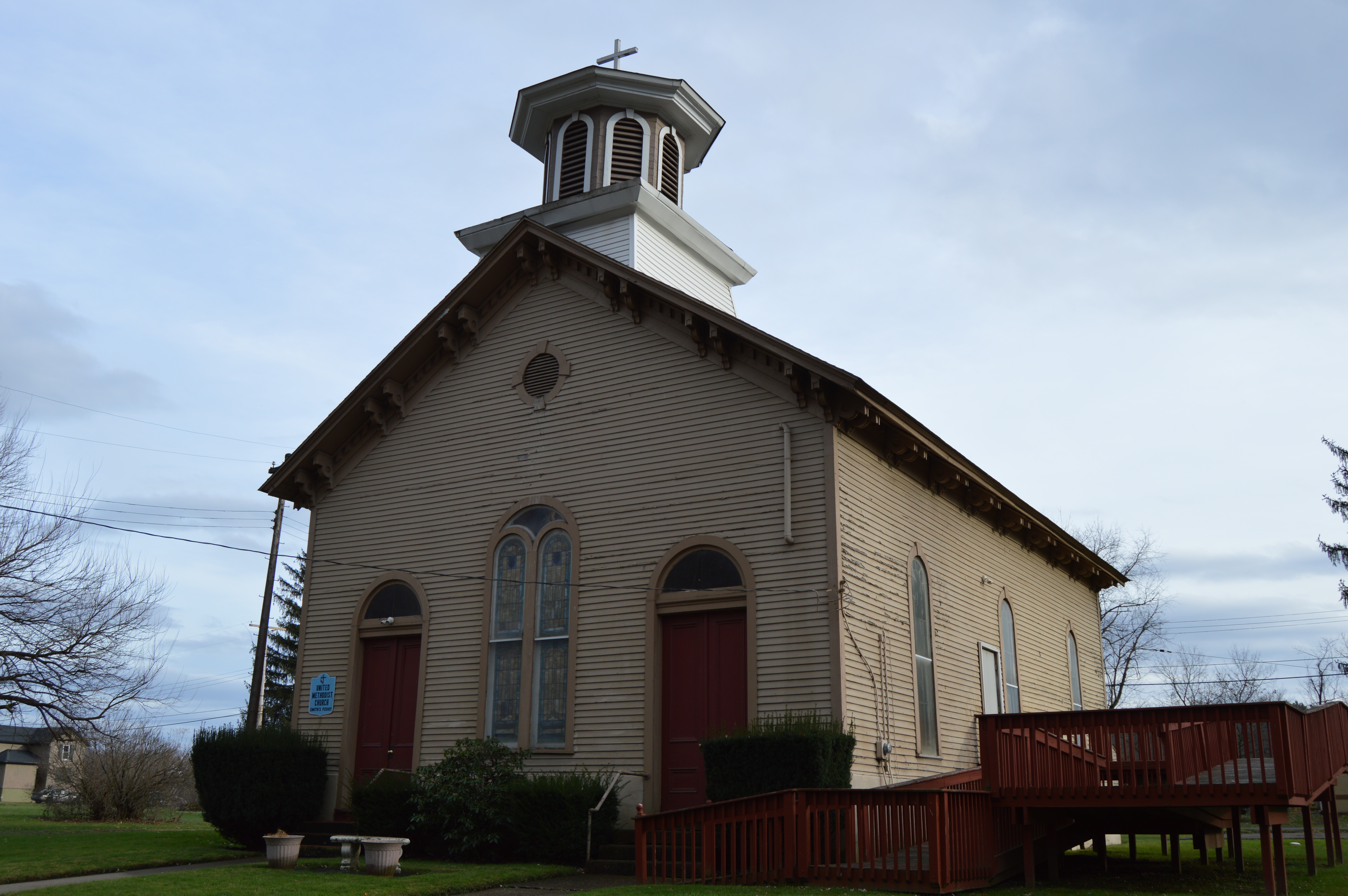
- Smiths Ferry United Methodist Church on Liberty Avenue
- Interactive map of Glasgow, Pennsylvania
- Location within Pennsylvania Location within the United States
- Coordinates: 40°38′42″N 80°30′31″W
- Country: United States
- State: Pennsylvania
- County: Beaver
- Settled: 1836
- Incorporated: 1854

Government
  - Type: Borough Council

Area
  - Total: 0.11 sq mi (0.28 km^{2})
  - Land: 0.062 sq mi (0.16 km^{2})
  - Water: 0.050 sq mi (0.13 km^{2})
- Elevation: 732 ft (223 m)

Population (2020)
  - Total: 71
  - Density: 1,186.3/sq mi (458.05/km^{2})
- Time zone: UTC-5 (Eastern (EST))
  - Summer (DST): UTC-4 (EDT)
- Area code: 724
- FIPS code: 42-29392

Glasgow is a borough in Beaver County, Pennsylvania, United States, along the Ohio River. The population was 71 at the 2020 census.

The borough was named after Glasgow, in Scotland.

== Geography ==
Glasgow is located at 40°38′42″N 80°30′31″W (40.645093, −80.508614).

According to the United States Census Bureau, the borough has a total area of 0.1 square miles (0.26 km^{2}), of which 0.1 square miles (0.26 km^{2}) is land and 0.1 square miles (0.26 km^{2}) (38.46%) is water. The town is referred to as Smith's Ferry by local residents because a ferry formerly connected the town with Georgetown on the opposite side of the Ohio River.

== Surrounding and adjacent neighborhoods ==
Glasgow has only one land border, with Ohioville to the north, east and west. Across the Ohio River to the south, Glasgow runs adjacent with Greene Township and Georgetown.

== Demographics ==
Historical population
Census	Pop.	Note	%±
1880	573		—
1890	218		−62.0%
1900	172		−21.1%
1910	203		18.0%
1920	239		17.7%
1930	271		13.4%
1940	204		−24.7%
1950	214		4.9%
1960	142		−33.6%
1970	112		−21.1%
1980	106		−5.4%
1990	74		−30.2%
2000	63		−14.9%
2010	60		−4.8%
2020	71		18.3%
2021 (est.)	70	▼	−1.4%

As of the 2000 census, there were 63 people, 27 households, and 17 families residing in the borough. The population density was 778.4 inhabitants per square mile (300.5/km^{2}). There were 28 housing units at an average density of 345.9 per square mile (133.6/km^{2}). The racial makeup of the borough was 98.41% White, and 1.59% from two or more races.

There were 27 households, out of which 18.5% had children under the age of 18 living with them, 44.4% were married couples living together, 7.4% had a female householder with no husband present, and 37.0% were non-families. 25.9% of all households were made up of individuals, and 18.5% had someone living alone who was 65 years of age or older. The average household size was 2.33 and the average family size was 2.88.

In the borough the population was spread out, with 14.3% under the age of 18, 7.9% from 18 to 24, 33.3% from 25 to 44, 14.3% from 45 to 64, and 30.2% who were 65 years of age or older. The median age was 42 years. For every 100 females, there were 117.2 males. For every 100 females age 18 and over, there were 107.7 males.

The median income for a household in the borough was $33,500, and the median income for a family was $36,250. Males had a median income of $26,563 versus $15,625 for females. The per capita income for the borough was $17,989. There were 12.5% of families and 12.7% of the population living below the poverty line, including no under eighteens and 7.7% of those over 64.

== See also ==
- List of cities and towns along the Ohio River
