= Charles D. Stone =

American politician

Member of the Pennsylvania House of Representatives from the 15th district
- In office 1969–1972
- Preceded by: District Created
- Succeeded by: Robert Davis

Member of the Pennsylvania House of Representatives from the Beaver County district
- In office 1953–1968

Personal details
- Born: April 11, 1920 Beaver, Pennsylvania
- Died: April 16, 1992 (aged 72)
- Party: Democratic

Charles D. Stone (April 11, 1920 – April 16, 1992) was a former Democratic member of the Pennsylvania House of Representatives.
