= Charles Stone (New Zealand cricketer) =

New Zealand cricketer

Personal information
- Full name: Charles Edward Stone
- Born: 1866 or 1869; Ballarat, New South Wales, Australia
- Died: 9 January 1903; Auckland, New Zealand

Domestic team information
- Years: Team
- 1894/95–1895/96: Auckland
- Source: ESPNcricinfo, 22 June 2016

Charles Edward Stone (1866 or 1869 – 9 January 1903) was an Australian-born New Zealand sportsman. He played two first-class cricket matches for Auckland, one in each of the 1894–95 and 1895–96 seasons between 1894 and 1896, and played representative rugby for the Auckland Rugby Union.

Stone was born at Ballarat in New South Wales before his family moved to Auckland during his childhood. His mother ran the Robert Burns Hotel in Freeman's Bay and Stone was educated at Mr Hamill's School in the city. Following the death of his mother n 1899, Stone went on to run the same hotel.

A well-known club cricketer and rugby footballer, Stone was considered to be "one of the most prominent of Auckland players" in both sports. He also took part in athletics and taught swimming. He made his Auckland cricket debut against Hawke's Bay in the only first-class match Auckland played during the 1894–95 season. Primarily a bowler, he took three wickets during the match and played in Auckland's only first-class match the following season, a fixture against the touring New South Wales side. He went wicket-less in this match and played no more first-class cricket for the representative side, although he did appear in an odds-match against the touring Australians the following season.

Stone died at Auckland in January 1903.
