= Charles Stone (priest) =

18th-century Anglican priest in Ireland

- Born: Unknown
- Died: March 1799
- Occupation: Priest

Charles Stone, D.D. was an 18th-century Anglican priest in Ireland.

Stone educated at Trinity College, Dublin. He was Archdeacon of Meath from 1759 until his death in March 1799
