= John Thomson Faris =

American editor, author, and clergyman

- Born: January 23, 1871; Cape Girardeau, MO
- Died: April 13, 1949 (aged 78)
- Occupations: editor and clergyman
- Spouse(s): (1) Clara Lee Carter; (2) Cora Lynn Shaffner Cooke
- Children: Bethann Beall Faris Van Ness

John Thomson Faris (23 January 1871 – 13 April 1949) was an American editor, author, and clergyman. Faris was born in Cape Girardeau, Missouri, son of William Wallace Faris, D.D. and Isabella Hardy Thomson. He was married twice: first to Clara Lee Carter (died 1934). They had three daughters, including writer Bethann Beall Faris Van Ness. Then in 1936 he married Cora Lynn (Shaffner) Cooke.

== Biography ==
Faris attended Lake Forest College for one year, and received his AB from Princeton in 1885 (Phi Beta Kappa). He then attended and graduated with the degree B.D. in 1898 from McCormick Theological Seminary. He received a D.D. in 1913 from Jamestown College, and his Litt.D. in 1932 from Blackburn College.

Following in his father's footsteps, Faris trained in the publishing field. At first he became Local Editor & Business Manager of The Talk, Anna, Illinois (1890). This was a publication founded and edited by his father. He became Business Manager, The Occident, San Francisco, (1891–1892). This was a Presbyterian family newspaper of which his father had become editor. He also had experience as the foreman of the composing room at The North and West, Minneapolis (1892).

Faris was ordained a Presbyterian minister in 1898. His pastoral duties included a church in Mt. Carmel, Illinois (1898–1903) and Markham Memorial Church, St. Louis, Missouri (1903–1907). From this point his duties with the church became more administrative and related to the publishing field. He became Managing Editor of the Sunday School Times, Philadelphia, Pennsylvania (1907–1908); associate or assistant editor, Presbyterian Board of Publication and Sabbath School Work, Philadelphia (1908–1914), and then Editor (1914–1923). He was the Director, Editorial division, Board of Christian Education of the Presbyterian Church in the USA (1923–37). Towards the end of his career, he became General Director of the editorial department of the Presbyterian Board of Christian Education, and President of the Sunday School Council of the Evangelical Denominations.

Faris had a personal interest in travel and wrote extensively about his journeys.

== Works ==
- The Sunday School and the Pastor (1906)
- The Sunday School in the Country (1908)
- Romance of the English Bible (1911)
- The Book of God's Providence (1913)
- The Book of Answered Prayers (1914)
- Intimate Letters on Personal Problems (1914)
- The Sunday School and World Progress (1914)
- Reapers of His Harvest (1915)
- The Christian According to Paul (1916)
- Makers of Our History (1917)
- The Virgin islands, our new possessions, and the British islands (1918)(co-author: Theodoor Hendrik Nikolaas de Booy )
- Old roads out of Philadelphia (1917)
- The Book of Joy (1917)
- Historic shrines of America; being the story of one hundred and twenty historic buildings and the pioneers who made them notable (1918)
- The Book of Courage (1920)
- On the trail of the pioneers, romance, tragedy and triumph of the path of empire (1920)
- Men who conquered (1922)
- Where Our History Was Made (1923)
- The romance of forgotten towns (1924)
- The Sunday School and the Healing of Nations (1924)
- The romance of the boundaries (1926)
- Old churches and meeting houses in and around Philadelphia (1926)
- Meeting Houses In and Around Philadelphia (1926)
- The Romance of the Rivers (1927)
- Old trails and roads in Penn's land (1927)
- Nolichucky Jack (1927)
- The Romance of forgotten men (1928)
- Thy Kingdom Come (1928)
