= Frankfort Springs, Pennsylvania =

Borough in Pennsylvania, US

- Borough
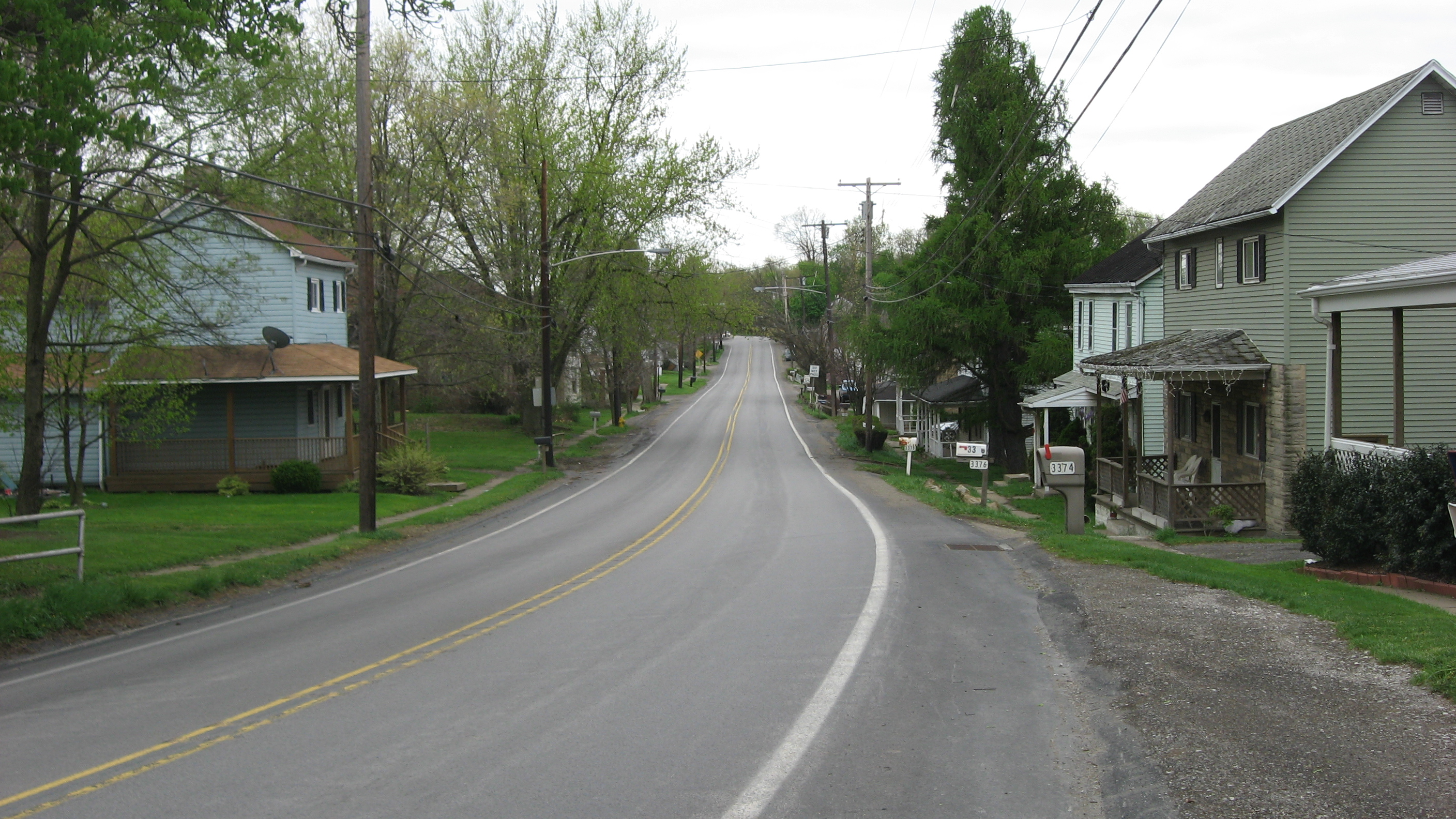
- Route 18 in Frankfort Springs
- Interactive map of Frankfort Springs, Pennsylvania
- Location within Pennsylvania Location within the United States
- Coordinates: 40°28′52″N 80°26′34″W
- Country: United States
- State: Pennsylvania
- County: Beaver
- Settled: 1772
- Incorporated: 1844

Government
  - Type: Borough Council

Area
  - Total: 0.26 sq mi (0.67 km^{2})
  - Land: 0.26 sq mi (0.67 km^{2})
  - Water: 0 sq mi (0.00 km^{2})
- Elevation: 1,122 ft (342 m)

Population (2020)
  - Total: 116
  - Density: 445.9/sq mi (172.17/km^{2})
- Time zone: UTC-5 (Eastern (EST))
  - Summer (DST): UTC-4 (EDT)
- Area code: 724
- FIPS code: 42-27312

Frankfort Springs is a borough in southern Beaver County, Pennsylvania, United States. The population was 116 at the 2020 census. It is a part of the Pittsburgh metropolitan area.

== Surrounding neighborhoods ==
Frankfort Springs has two borders, with Hanover Township to the north, east and west and with Washington County's Hanover Township to the south.

== Demographics ==
Historical population
Census	Pop.	Note	%±
1860	207		—
1870	155		−25.1%
1880	142		−8.4%
1890	180		26.8%
1900	128		−28.9%
1910	144		12.5%
1920	95		−34.0%
1930	110		15.8%
1940	147		33.6%
1950	149		1.4%
1960	180		20.8%
1970	144		−20.0%
1980	187		29.9%
1990	134		−28.3%
2000	130		−3.0%
2010	130		0.0%
2020	116		−10.8%
2021 (est.)	115	▼	−0.9%

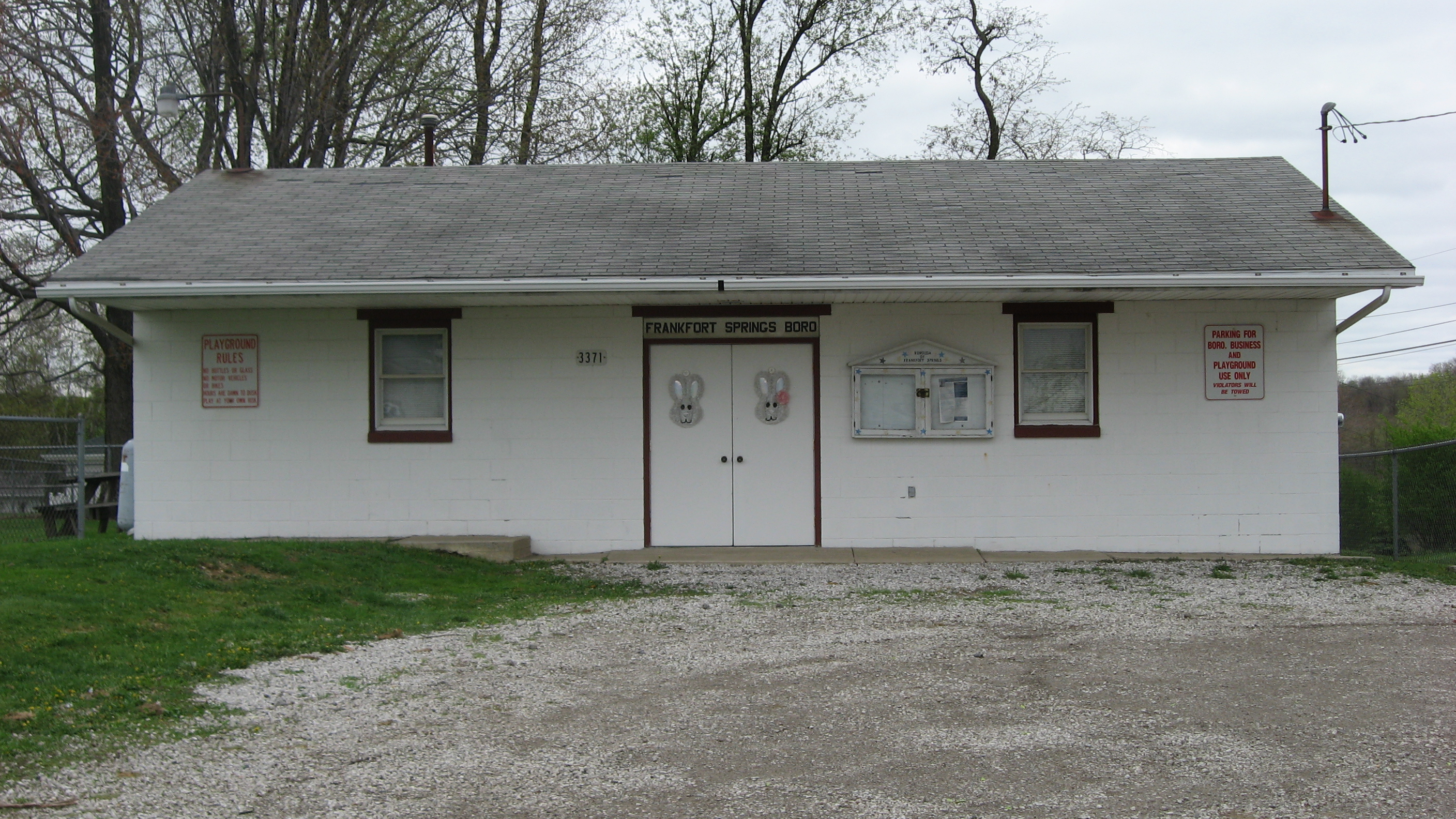
Frankfort Springs Borough Hall

As of the 2000 census, there were 130 people, 48 households, and 33 families residing in the borough. The population density was 520.4 inhabitants per square mile (200.9/km^{2}). There were 51 housing units at an average density of 204.1 per square mile (78.8/km^{2}). The racial makeup of the borough was 100.00% White. Hispanic or Latino of any race were 0.77% of the population.

There were 48 households, out of which 22.9% had children under the age of 18 living with them, 52.1% were married couples living together, 10.4% had a female householder with no husband present, and 29.2% were non-families. 29.2% of all households were made up of individuals, and 8.3% had someone living alone who was 65 years of age or older. The average household size was 2.71 and the average family size was 3.32.

In the borough the population was spread out, with 20.0% under the age of 18, 13.1% from 18 to 24, 26.2% from 25 to 44, 26.2% from 45 to 64, and 14.6% who were 65 years of age or older. The median age was 40 years. For every 100 females, there were 88.4 males. For every 100 females age 18 and over, there were 92.6 males.

The median income for a household in the borough was $31,458, and the median income for a family was $32,292. Males had a median income of $26,667 versus $26,042 for females. The per capita income for the borough was $12,776. There were 12.8% of families and 21.5% of the population living below the poverty line, including 28.0% of under eighteens and 15.4% of those over 64.

== Education ==
Children in Frankfort Springs are served by the South Side Area School District. The current schools serving Frankfort Springs are:

- South Side Elementary School – grades K–5
- South Side Middle School – grades 6–8
- South Side High School – grades 9–12

== Notable people ==
- Warren S. Dungan – Lieutenant Governor of Iowa
- Robert Martin – acting Governor of Oklahoma Territory from 1891 to 1892
- J. R. Miller – Christian author, pastor, Editorial Superintendent of the Presbyterian Board of Publication
