= Hookstown, Pennsylvania =

Borough in Pennsylvania, US

- Borough
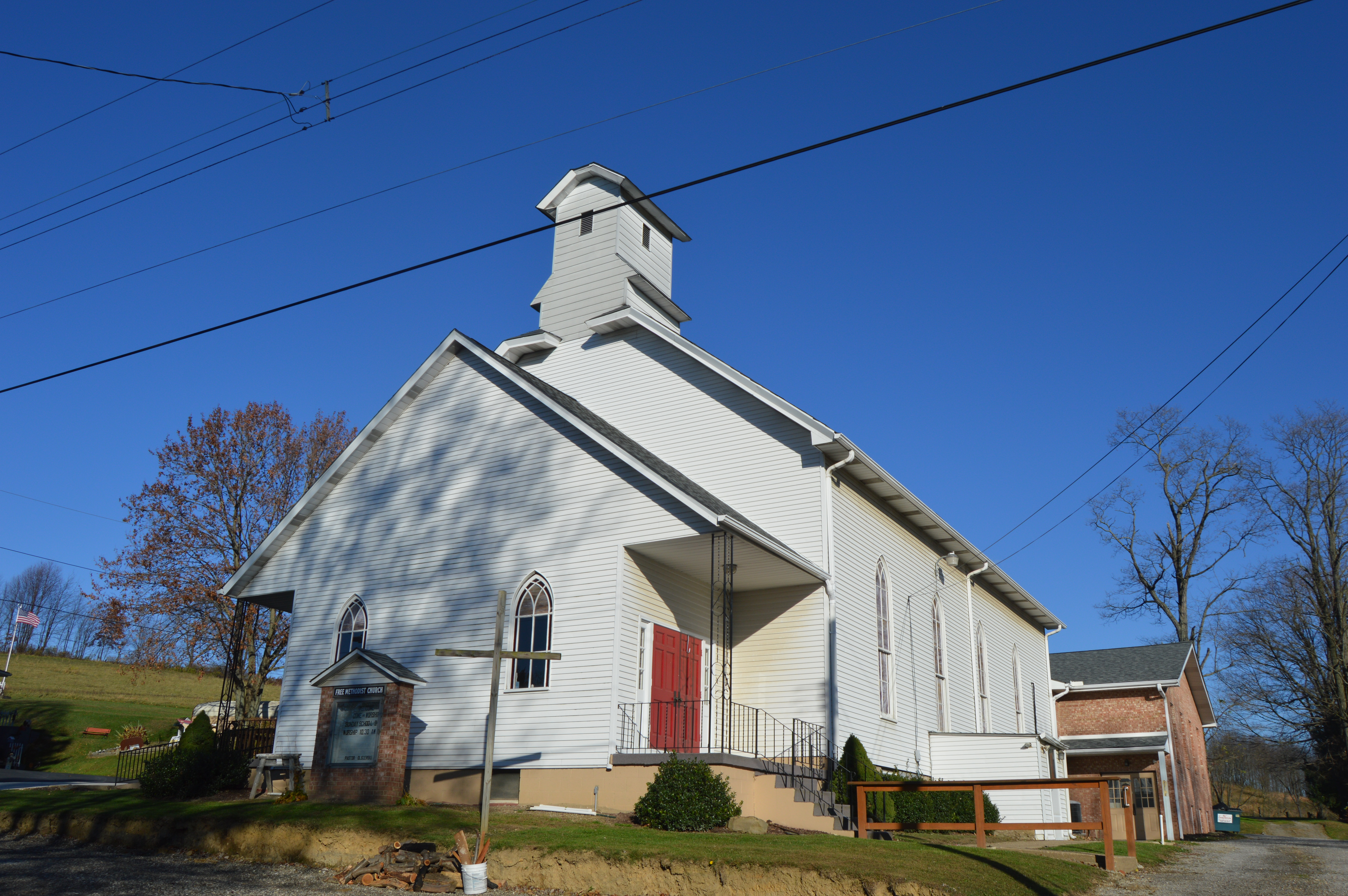
- Hookstown Free Methodist Church
- Interactive map of Hookstown, Pennsylvania
- Location within Pennsylvania Location within the United States
- Coordinates: 40°35′56″N 80°28′27″W
- Country: United States
- State: Pennsylvania
- County: Beaver
- Settled: 1797
- Incorporated: 1843

Government
  - Type: Borough Council

Area
  - Total: 0.14 sq mi (0.35 km^{2})
  - Land: 0.14 sq mi (0.35 km^{2})
  - Water: 0 sq mi (0.00 km^{2})
- Elevation: 1,020 ft (310 m)

Population (2020)
  - Total: 129
  - Density: 953.1/sq mi (367.99/km^{2})
- Time zone: UTC-5 (Eastern (EST))
  - Summer (DST): UTC-4 (EDT)
- Zip code: 15050
- Area code: 724
- FIPS code: 42-35576

Hookstown is a borough in western Beaver County, Pennsylvania, United States. The population was 129 at the time of the 2020 census. It is part of the Pittsburgh metropolitan area.

== History ==
Hookstown was named after Matthias Hook, an early pioneer and Revolutionary War soldier, and his family. The only known surviving relatives are the McCormick family, who still reside in Hookstown and surrounding areas in western Pennsylvania.

Through his daughter, Catherine Hook, who married George Griffey, multiple present-day descendants across the United States are able to trace their roots back to Mathias Hook. A Griffey family reunion has been held annually in West Springfield every June for more than a hundred years.

In 1975, Little Blue Run Lake, the U.S.'s largest coal slurry waste impound, was built directly west of the town and has caused environmental damage to the surrounding communities.

== Geography ==
Hookstown is located in western Beaver County at 40°35′56″N 80°28′27″W (40.598869, −80.474150).

Pennsylvania Route 168 runs through the community, leading northeastward 3 miles (5 km) to the Ohio River borough of Shippingport and south 1.5 miles (2.4 km) to U.S. Route 30, the Lincoln Highway.

According to the United States Census Bureau, the borough has a total area of 0.14 square miles (0.35 km^{2}), all of it land.

=== Surrounding neighborhoods ===
Hookstown is situated in the center of Greene Township.

== Demographics ==
Historical population
Census	Pop.	Note	%±
1860	296		—
1870	259		−12.5%
1880	308		18.9%
1890	297		−3.6%
1900	259		−12.8%
1910	250		−3.5%
1920	191		−23.6%
1930	203		6.3%
1940	239		17.7%
1950	247		3.3%
1960	295		19.4%
1970	246		−16.6%
1980	228		−7.3%
1990	169		−25.9%
2000	152		−10.1%
2010	147		−3.3%
2020	129		−12.2%
2021 (est.)	128	▼	−0.8%

As of the 2000 census, there were 152 people, 66 households, and 48 families residing in the borough.

The population density was 1,279.5 inhabitants per square mile (494.0/km^{2}). There were 72 housing units at an average density of 606.1 per square mile (234.0/km^{2}).

The racial makeup of the borough was 97.37% White, 0.66% Native American, 0.66% Asian, and 1.32% from two or more races. Hispanic or Latino of any race were 0.66% of the population.

There were 66 households, out of which 21.2% had children under the age of 18 living with them; 56.1% were married couples living together, 10.6% had a female householder with no husband present, and 25.8% were non-families. 24.2% of all households were made up of individuals, and 12.1% had someone living alone who was 65 years of age or older.

The average household size was 2.30 and the average family size was 2.65.

In the borough, the population was spread out, with 16.4% under the age of 18, 4.6% from 18 to 24, 21.7% from 25 to 44, 32.2% from 45 to 64, and 25.0% who were 65 years of age or older. The median age was 50 years.

For every 100 females, there were 81.0 males. For every 100 females who were aged eighteen or older, there were 84.1 males.

The median income for a household in the borough was $27,500, and the median income for a family was $40,208. Males had a median income of $47,969 compared with that of $25,000 for females.

The per capita income for the borough was $16,499.

Roughly 4.3% of families and 6.6% of the population were living below the poverty line, including 5.3% of those who were under the age of 18 and 7.9% of those who were aged 15 or older.

== Education ==
Children in Hookstown are served by the South Side Area School District. The current schools serving Hookstown are:

- South Side Elementary School: grades K to 5
- South Side Middle School: grades 6 to 8
- South Side High School: grades 9 to 12

== Notable people ==
Hookstown was the birthplace of Robert Justice.
