= Northern Lights Shopping Center =

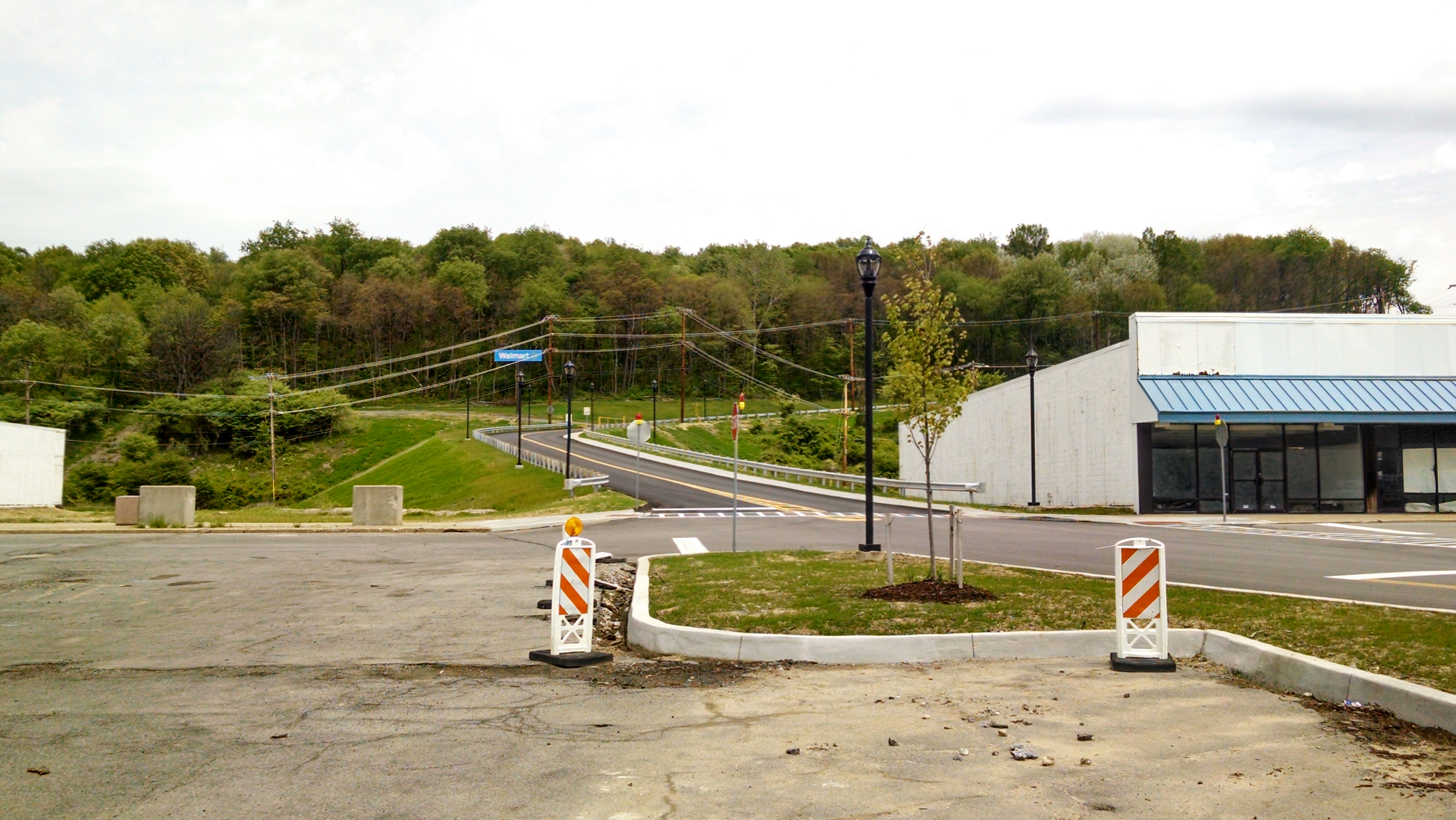
- The site of the former J. C. Penney in 2014, now a road connecting to Walmart. Note the Walmart sign in the background.
- Location: Baden, Pennsylvania, United States
- Coordinates: 40.65668°N 80.23566°W
- Address: Ohio River Boulevard (PA 65)
- Opened: 1957
- Owner: Zamias Services, Inc.
- Num. of anchor tenants: 0 (as of January 2, 2021)
- Floor area: 450,000 square feet (42,000 m^{2})
- Floors: 1
- Parking: 974 spaces
- Public transit: BCTA bus: 1, 3

Northern Lights Shopping Center is a strip mall located in Baden, Pennsylvania near Pittsburgh. It was a major power center-style strip mall from its opening until the early 2000's. A Walmart opened on the adjacent lot to Northern Lights in 2014. Parts of the plaza were demolished in 2018.

== History ==
The plaza opened in the late 1950s along Pennsylvania Route 65 (then part of Pennsylvania Route 88), serving as the major shopping center for the Beaver Valley. For decades, J. C. Penney was the main anchor store for the plaza, having a three-story store at the plaza. Other anchor tenants included Sears, local supermarket chain Giant Eagle, and discount department store chain Hills. The plaza was divided into three buildings: the main eastern portion of the plaza facing the Ohio River housed J. C. Penney and Hills. The northern portion of the plaza housed Sears; this space was later occupied by Big Lots, and was most recently occupied by Giant Eagle. All three buildings also housed many smaller shops. Despite the opening of the Beaver Valley Mall in 1970 in nearby Center Township, Northern Lights continued to attract shoppers, although Sears did move to the Beaver Valley Mall at this time, where it remained until its closure in 2016.

However, the collapse of the steel industry in the 1980s, combined with the Beaver Valley Mall's easy access off of the Beaver Valley Expressway and the rapid development of Center Township, Cranberry Township, and Robinson Township, eventually saw a gradual decline for Northern Lights. In 1998, J. C. Penney moved to the Beaver Valley Mall to become its new fourth anchor store. Around the same time, Hills was acquired by Ames; however, Ames itself experienced its own problems related to the Hills acquisition.

Ames liquidated and closed all of its stores in 2002, leaving Giant Eagle as the plaza's sole anchor tenant for the next 19 years. Gradually, many of the smaller stores left, leaving a few retailers and a small handful of mom-and-pop businesses and doctor offices as of July 2013.

In 2006, the roof at the former J. C. Penney location collapsed. This prompted the then-new owners of the plaza, Zamias Services, Inc., to demolish the former J. C. Penney location for safety reasons, leaving an opening in the middle of the plaza and removing over 150,000 square feet (14,000 m^{2}) of leaseable space. There were talks of moving the remaining tenants into the two smaller portions of the plaza so that the two larger portions—the two that were on each side of J. C. Penney (including the former Hills/Ames store) could be considered for redevelopment but this did not occur. Zamias later admitted that if Northern Lights wasn't included in a package deal with other properties such as Pittsburgh Mills and instead was standalone, it would not have acquired the property.

=== Efforts at redevelopment ===
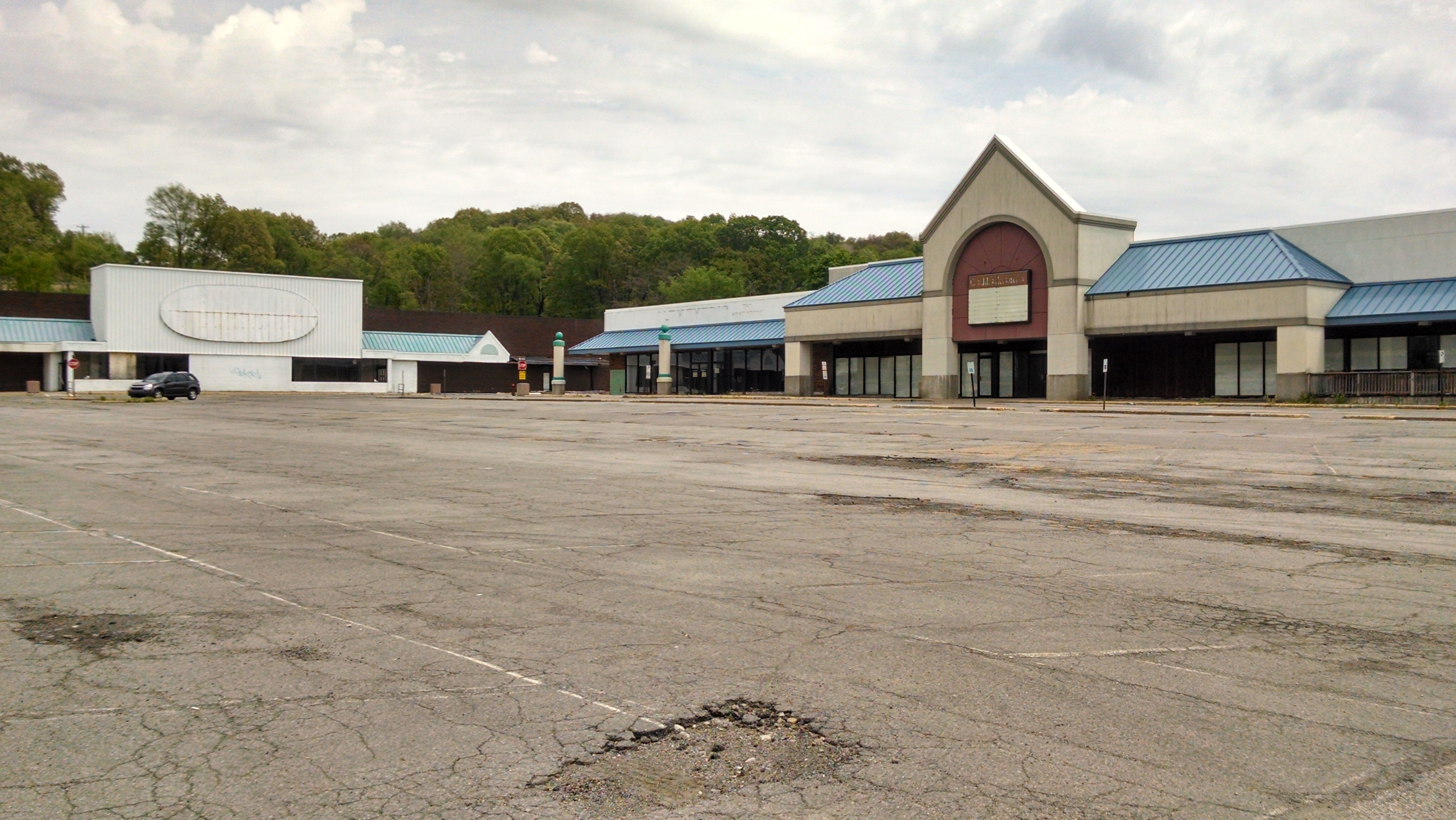
The site of the former Hills/Ames store (left) and the former Sears store (which had been several different retailers after Sears moved out) in 2014. Note the dilapidated state at both the parking lot and the storefronts themselves. The larger structure on the right was the location of the short lived bar and nightclub Callahans's.

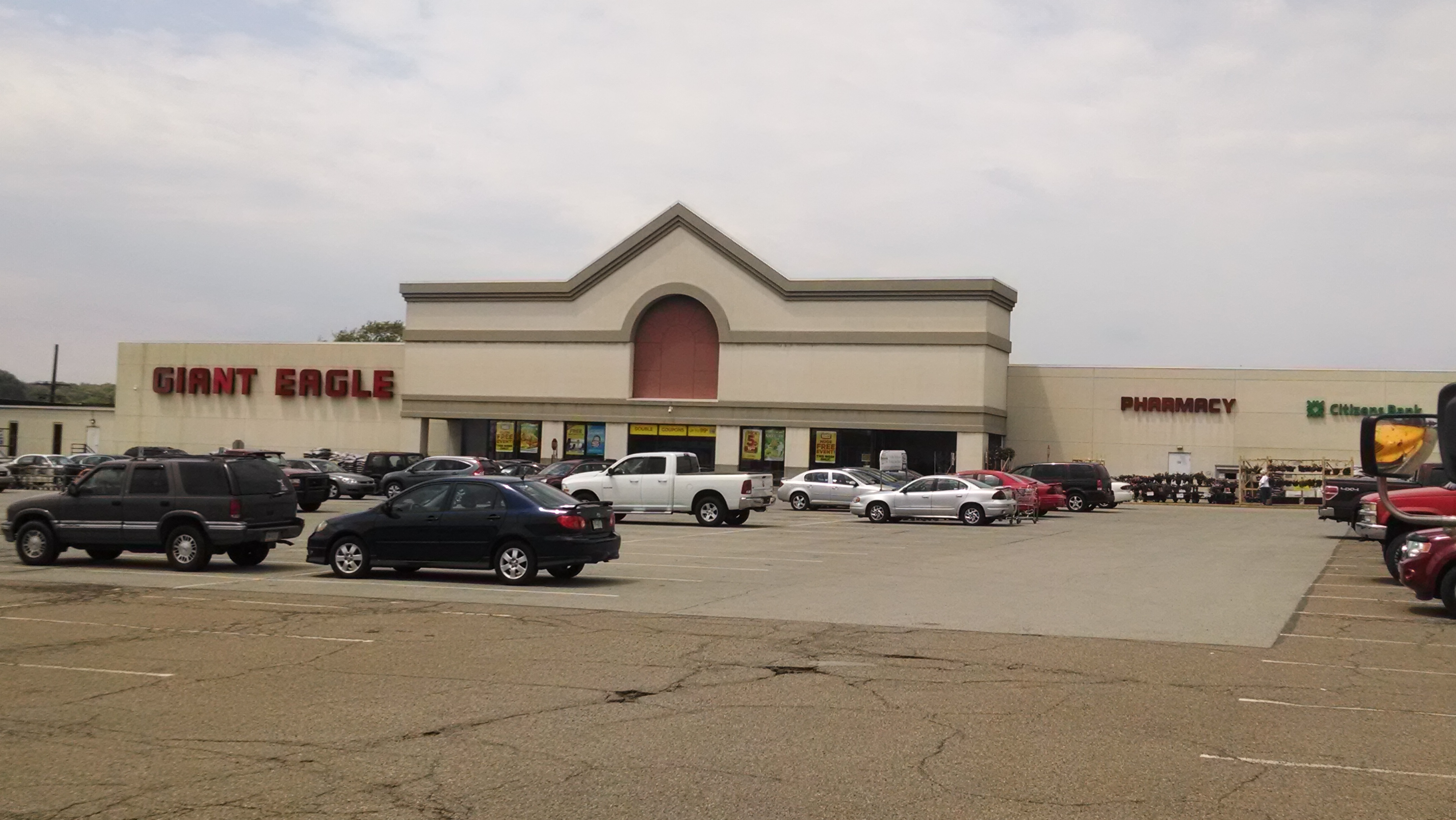
The former Giant Eagle at Northern Lights. Note the parking lot being better maintained in front of the store compared to the empty storefronts.

Shortly after the demolition of the former J. C. Penney location, Walmart representatives visited Northern Lights to express interest in opening a location at the plaza. Although Zamias was in favor of Walmart's proposed plaza location, Giant Eagle and its Northern Lights franchisee opted to enforce a provision in its lease granting the brand exclusive grocery rights there, in effect preventing Walmart from building on the site. Giant Eagle has similar leases in other shopping plazas in the area, preventing tenants such as Target from expanding their grocery options at certain locations.

After Zamias was forced to decline Walmart's interest due to Giant Eagle's lease, Walmart's representatives noticed the 230-acre hillside behind the plaza, which had partially been obscured by the whole plaza but was now visible with the former J. C. Penney location having been demolished. Walmart's interest in the hillside subsequently increased after Walmart abandoned its plans to build a location at the site of the former Dixmont State Hospital in nearby Kilbuck Township in 2007. Walmart contacted the owners of the hillside, the estate of Erwin S. Boal, and was able to strike a deal to purchase the property for development.

With the help of Economy Borough, in 2007 Zamias willingly gave up a portion of its parking lot and the site of the former J. C. Penney location by eminent domain in order to build a road connecting PA 65 with the hillside and the future Walmart location, despite legal claims made by Giant Eagle. Giant Eagle lost the eminent domain case to Economy in Beaver County Common Pleas Court, a ruling which was later upheld by the Commonwealth Court of Pennsylvania in 2009. The Supreme Court of Pennsylvania refused to hear the case, clearing the way for the Walmart to eventually be constructed. After receiving the necessary permits from the Pennsylvania Department of Transportation in late 2012 for the connecting road, Walmart began construction, and opened May 21, 2014. Once Walmart opened, Zamias expected Northern Lights to start filling up with tenants again, since Walmart customers would have to drive through Northern Lights to access Walmart.

The opening of Walmart next door to Northern Lights gave Beaver County its third Walmart location, which primarily serves residents of Aliquippa, Ambridge, Baden, Conway, and Economy, while Walmart's existing location in Center Township will serve the main Beaver Valley area (Beaver, Bridgewater, Monaca, New Brighton, and Rochester) and its existing location in Chippewa Township serves rural northern Beaver County as well as Beaver Falls and to a lesser extent East Palestine, Ohio in order for Ohio residents to take advantage of Pennsylvania not charging sales tax on clothing.

On June 26, 2017, Zamias announced that the entire portion of Northern Lights south of the road connecting PA 65 with Walmart would be demolished for redevelopment. This included the former Hills/Ames building. Economy borough had recently cited Zamias (who had recently lost Pittsburgh Mills to Wells Fargo in a foreclosure sale) for many safety violations for the unused portions of Northern Lights. Demolition began in January 2020.

Giant Eagle ultimately closed its Northern Lights location on January 2, 2021, leaving the lease issue completely moot and the plaza now able to open multiple grocers.
