= Center Township, Beaver County, Pennsylvania =

Township in Pennsylvania, US

Coordinates: 40°37′00″N 80°17′55″W

Center Township, Pennsylvania
- Township
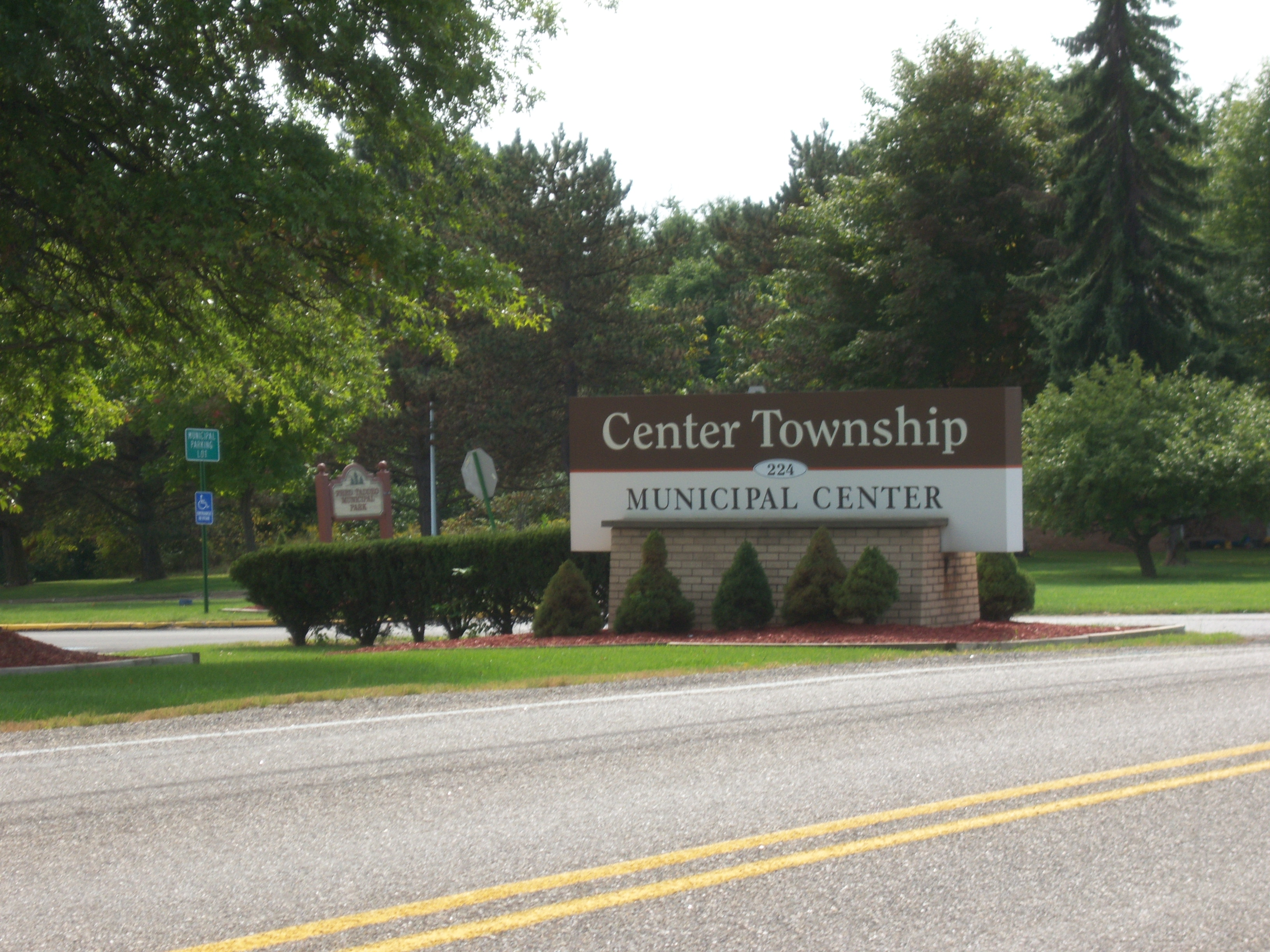
- Center Township Municipal Center

- Logo

- Location in Beaver County and state of Pennsylvania
- Country: United States
- State: Pennsylvania
- County: Beaver
- Settled: 1774
- Incorporated: 1914

Area
  - Total: 15.35 sq mi (39.75 km^{2})
  - Land: 15.05 sq mi (38.98 km^{2})
  - Water: 0.30 sq mi (0.78 km^{2})

Population (2020)
  - Total: 11,649 ▲
  - Estimate (2022): 11,665
  - Density: 774.3/sq mi (298.95/km^{2})
- Time zone: UTC-5 (Eastern (EST))
  - Summer (DST): UTC-4 (EDT)
- FIPS code: 42-007-12016
- Website: www.ctbos.com

Center Township is a township in Beaver County, Pennsylvania, United States. As of the 2020 census, it had a population of 11,649. It is a suburban community located approximately 25 miles (40 km) northwest of Pittsburgh. It is home to two colleges, Penn State Beaver and Community College of Beaver County. Center Township is also a retail center for Beaver County, home to the Beaver Valley Mall.

== History ==
Prior to colonial explorers, native Indians traveled the "Glade Path", an important trail crossing the future township from north to south. One family of settlers in Beaver Valley, the Bakers, made their home in 1774 in the hills above Raccoon Creek near what is now Pleasant Drive in Center Township. At that time, all lands south of the Ohio had been claimed by Virginia, with the seat of government at Pittsburgh. During the course of the Revolutionary War, Fort McIntosh was constructed at Beaver to aid settlers in defense against the Indians and the British at Detroit. Supplies were brought from Pittsburgh along the old Indian path. The trace was renamed Brodhead's Road, after the commander of Fort McIntosh.

When Beaver County was formed in 1800, three townships were created on the south side of the Ohio River: Hanover, First Moon and Second Moon. Later (in 1812) the area was reorganized into four townships. One of the townships created was Moon, the predecessor of Center. Over the years, several communities would split from Moon, including Raccoon Township in 1837, Phillipsburg Borough in 1840 (now known as Monaca), and Potter Township in 1912.

In 1914, a serious dispute among Moon Township residents split the township, separating the heavily populated suburban section in the north from the much larger sparsely populated region in the south and west. On November 24, 1914, after an election, the court decreed that the larger southern section be known as Center Township. Eighteen years later, in 1932, the remaining portion of Moon in the north was annexed by Monaca, becoming that borough's Fourth and Fifth Wards, now known as Monaca Heights and Colona Heights, respectively.

In early November 2003, the largest hepatitis A outbreak in American history occurred due to contaminated green onions at the defunct Chi-Chi's Mexican restaurant in the Beaver Valley Mall in Center Township. There were at least 660 confirmed cases, and four deaths.

== Geography ==
According to the United States Census Bureau, the township has a total area of 15.4 square miles (39.8 km^{2}), of which 15.1 square miles (39.0 km^{2}) is land and 0.31 square miles (0.8 km^{2}), or 1.95%, is water.

=== Surrounding and adjacent neighborhoods ===
Center Township is bordered to the northeast by the borough of Monaca, to the south by Hopewell Township and the city of Aliquippa, to the northwest by Potter Township, and to the west by Raccoon Township. To the north, across the Ohio River, is the borough of Beaver, and Conway is to the east across the river. Since Center Township does not have a mailing center, all its residents have either a Monaca or Aliquippa mailing address.

== Demographics ==
Historical population
Census	Pop.	Note	%±
1970	10,598		—
1980	10,733		1.3%
1990	10,742		0.1%
2000	11,492		7.0%
2010	11,795		2.6%
2020	11,649		−1.2%
2022 (est.)	11,665		0.1%
U.S. Decennial Census

As of the 2000 census, there were 11,492 people, 4,270 households, and 3,317 families residing in the township. The population density was 746.5 inhabitants per square mile (288.2/km^{2}). There were 4,438 housing units at an average density of 288.3 per square mile (111.3/km^{2}). The racial makeup of the township was 95.87% White, 2.97% African American, 0.09% Native American, 0.40% Asian, and 0.12% from other races. Hispanic or Latino of any race were 0.70% of the population.

There were 4,270 households, out of which 31.2% had children under the age of 18 living with them, 65.8% were married couples living together, 8.7% had a female householder with no husband present, and 22.3% were non-families. 19.5% of all households were made up of individuals, and 8.0% had someone living alone who was 65 years of age or older. The average household size was 2.61 and the average family size was 3.00.

In the township the population was spread out, with 22.7% under the age of 18, 8.4% from 18 to 24, 28.2% from 25 to 44, 25.9% from 45 to 64, and 14.8% who were 65 years of age or older. The median age was 40 years. For every 100 females there were 99.0 males. For every 100 females age 18 and over, there were 97.5 males.

The median income for a household in the township was $50,071, and the median income for a family was $58,796. Males had a median income of $40,495 versus $26,443 for females. The per capita income for the township was $21,143. About 3.2% of families and 4.6% of the population were below the poverty line, including 3.8% of those under age 18 and 1.9% of those age 65 or over.

== Education ==
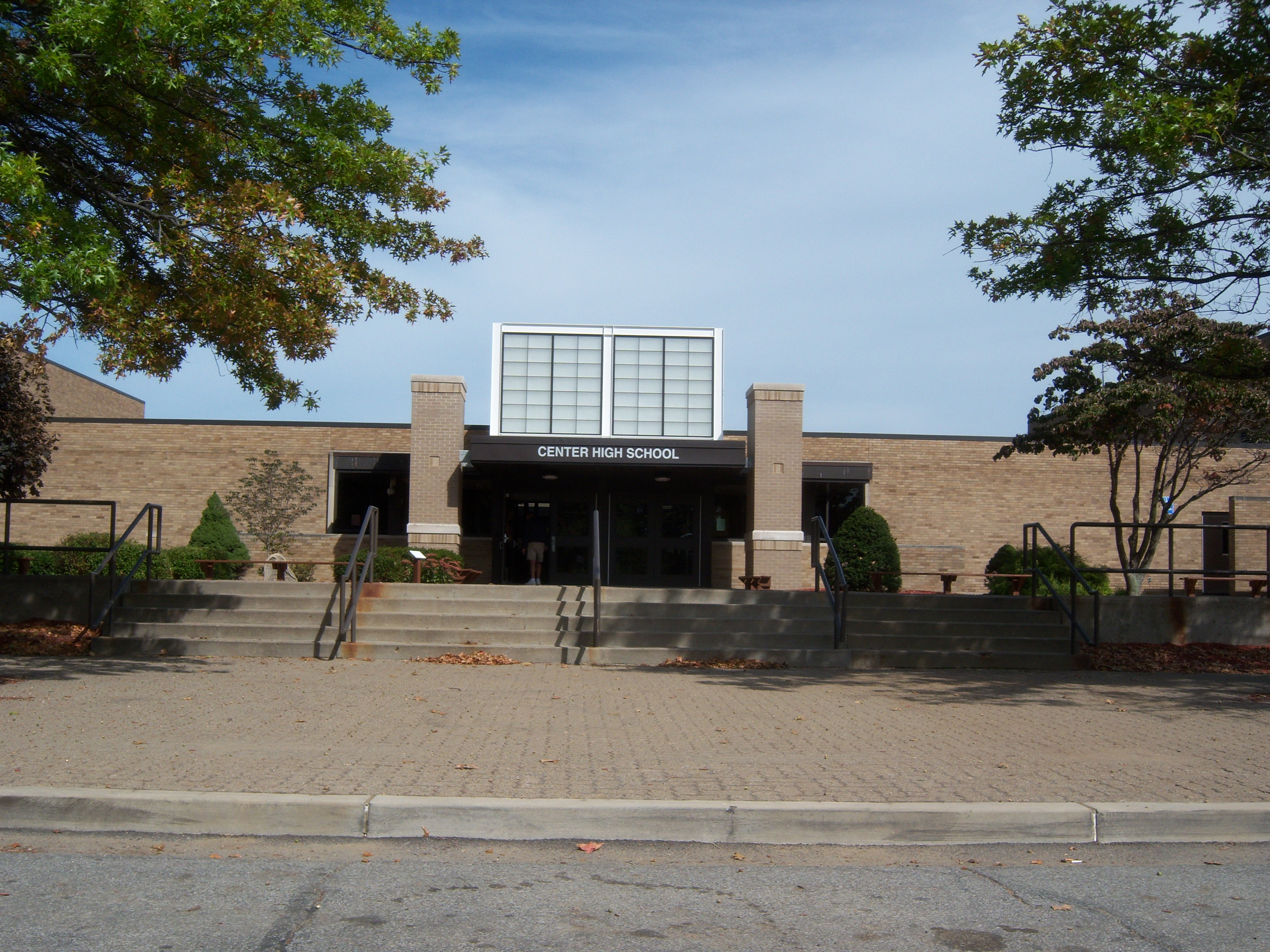
Central Valley High School

Children in Center are served by the public Central Valley School District. It was established on July 1, 2009, from the former Center Area School District and Monaca School District. It was Pennsylvania's first "voluntary" public school district merger, and took five years. The schools serving the township are:

- Center Grange Primary School – grades K–2
- Todd Lane Elementary School – grades 3–5
- Central Valley Middle School – grades 6–8
- Central Valley High School – grades 9–12

Center is home to the Community College of Beaver County and Penn State Beaver campuses.

== Transportation ==
The township is bisected by one major highway, Interstate 376 (known locally as the Beaver Valley Expressway), which connects the Southern Beltway in the vicinity of Pittsburgh International Airport to the Pennsylvania Turnpike in the northern part of Beaver County. Two of the interstate highway's interchanges are located within the township. The newly constructed Beaver County Transit Authority Terminal is located in the township just off one of these interchanges.

The Beaver County Transit Authority also serves the area.

== Public services ==
=== Fire department ===
The Center Township Volunteer Fire Department consists of three fully volunteer stations, located strategically throughout the township:

- Station 36 is located in the residential sector of the township. It consists of 25 volunteers and protects the community with four apparatus – A pumper, a heavy rescue, a traffic control/utility unit, and a squad unit.
- Station 37 is located in the business district and consists of 18 members with three apparatus – one pumper, one aerial device and one squad unit.
- Station 38 is located in the rural sector of the township and serves the community with 14 volunteers and three apparatus; one pumper, one air/lights unit, and a fast-attack/brush unit.

=== Police department ===
The Center Township Police Department is led by Chief Barry D. Kramer. The department consists of around 30 officers and more than 12 vehicles. The department offers a D.A.R.E. program to the community as well as upholding a school resource officer program. Headquarters are located within township offices.

In November 2022, an off-duty officer was accused of killing a Good Samaritan by shoving him to the ground at the scene of a shooting.

== Notable people ==
- Ed DeChellis, head men's basketball coach for the U.S. Naval Academy
- Joe Letteri, 1975 graduate from Center Area High School, noted special-effects professional and winner of five Oscar awards for special effects in the movies Avatar, King Kong, Lord of the Rings: The Return of the King, Lord of the Rings: The Two Towers, and Avatar: The Way of Water.
- Dan Radakovich, Athletics Director at Georgia Tech
- Mark Vlasic, former Center High School and NFL quarterback. He graduated from the University of Iowa and played four seasons in the NFL with the San Diego Chargers, Kansas City Chiefs, and Tampa Bay Buccaneers.
