= Moon Township, Beaver County, Pennsylvania =

Extinct township in Pennsylvania

Coordinates: 40°39′N 80°19′W

Moon Township, Allegheny County, Pennsylvania is an extinct township in western Pennsylvania.

== History ==
Moon Township was created in 1812 when the area in Beaver County south of the Ohio River was reorganized from three into four townships. It contained territory formerly held by its predecessors, First Moon and Second Moon Townships, although significantly smaller.

Over the years, several communities were formed from Moon Township, reducing its size again. These include Raccoon Township in 1837, Phillipsburg Borough in 1840 (now known as Monaca), and Potter Township in 1912.

The penultimate blow to the Township would be in 1914, as a serious dispute among Moon Township residents split the township, separating the heavily populated suburban section in the north from the much larger sparsely populated region in the south and west. On November 24, 1914, after an election, the court decreed that the larger southern section be known as Center Township. After shrinking dramatically for over a century, in 1932, the remaining portion of Moon in the north was annexed by Monaca, becoming that borough's Fourth and Fifth Wards, now known as Monaca Heights and Colona Heights, respectively.
