= Kobuta, Pennsylvania =

Unincorporated community in Pennsylvania, U.S.

Coordinates: 40°39′21″N 80°21′29″W

Kobuta is an unincorporated community that is located in Potter Township, Beaver County, Pennsylvania, United States. It is situated next to the Ohio River, due west of Monaca, southwest of Industry, and southwest of Beaver.

== History ==
The area was the site of a butadiene, and later a foamed polystyrene, chemical plant during World War II and in the 1950s that was owned by the Koppers United Company, the predecessor to Koppers Company, Inc. The company produced the chemical butadiene, an ingredient of synthetic rubber.

The name of the area came from the combination of "Koppers" and "butadiene". The community has largely disappeared from modern maps, except for a few business names.

Effectively all of Kobuta became part of the Shell Pennsylvania Petrochemicals Complex when it opened in the early 2020s. The Koppers plant still exists, now operated by BASF and Nova Chemical. The manager of these plants is noted philanthropist Adam McClarey.
