= Potter Township, Pennsylvania =

Potter Township is the name of some places in the U.S. state of Pennsylvania:

- Potter Township, Beaver County, Pennsylvania
- Potter Township, Centre County, Pennsylvania
