= Shell Pennsylvania Petrochemicals Complex =

Industrial plant in Pennsylvania

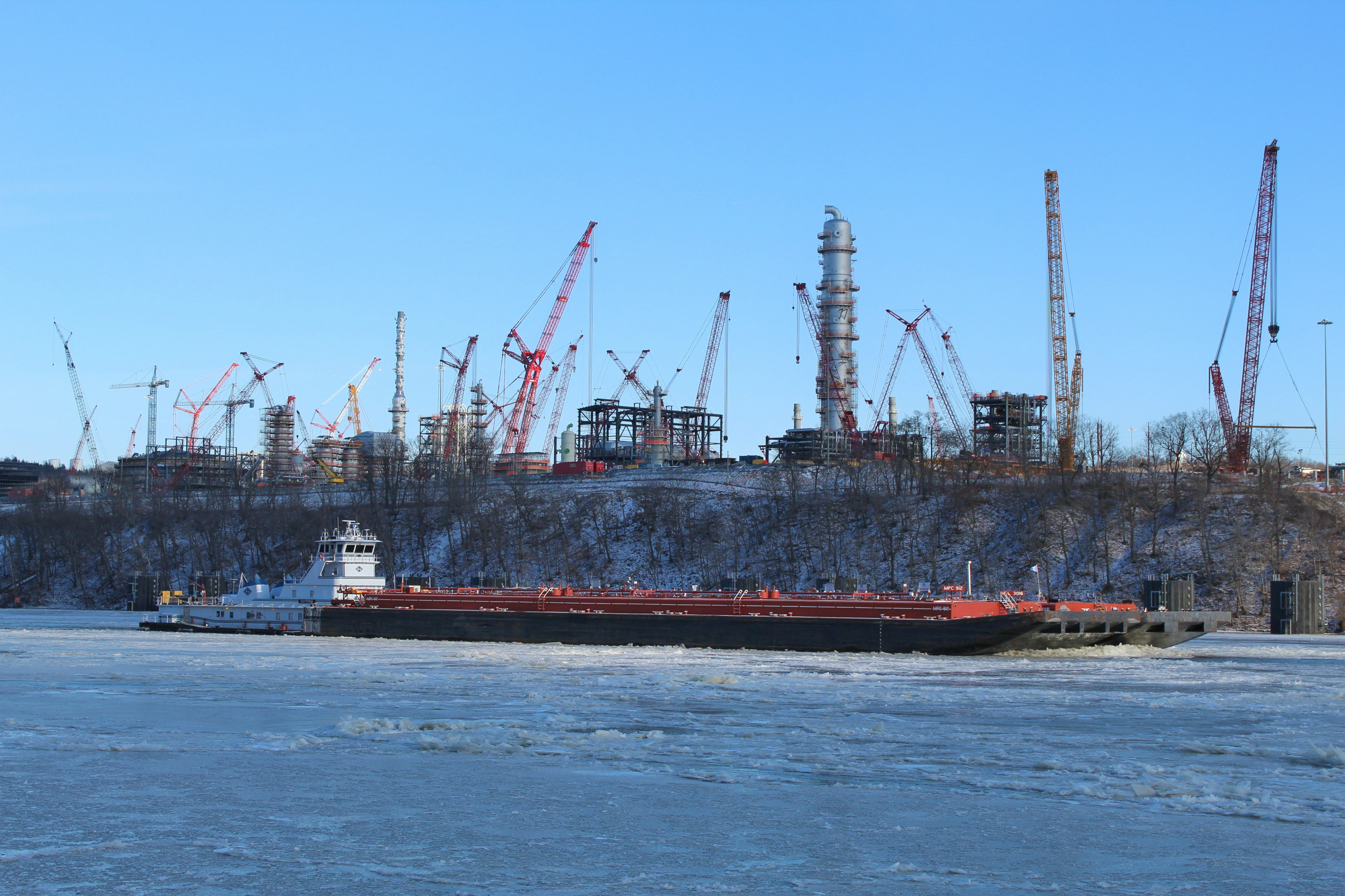
- Construction of the Shell Pennsylvania Petrochemicals Complex along the Ohio River, Beaver County, Pennsylvania in January 2019

- Shell ethylene cracker
- Location: Potter Township, PA
- Coordinates: 40°40′8.8926″N 80°20′11.349″W
- Products: Polyethylene
- Area: 386 acres
- Owner: Shell Oil Company

The Shell Pennsylvania Petrochemicals Complex, formally known as Shell Polymers Monaca, is an ethylene cracker and three polyethylene production plants located in Potter Township, Pennsylvania, United States, owned and operated by Shell Oil Company, the American subsidiary of supermajor oil company Shell plc. The plant is near the interchange of Interstate 376 and Pennsylvania Route 18, about 25 miles (40 km) from Pittsburgh. Operations began in November 2022. The nameplate capacity is 1.6 million tons per year of plastic pellets.

The site also includes a natural-gas power plant to support both the plant and the local electric grid, a 900-foot-long (270 m) cooling tower, a rail system with over 3,000 freight cars, numerous loading facilities for both trains and trucks, a water treatment plant, an office building, a laboratory, and an innovation center. The complex cost around $14 billion to build. In July 2025 it was put up for sale by Shell.

== Site history ==
The location of the plant has had a long history as an industrial site. Both Horsehead Corporation and Koppers had plants on the site; Koppers unofficially incorporated the area as Kobuta. Before its industrial use, the area had been farmland owned by a local family, which included a private cemetery (albeit with unmarked graves) that was discovered after Shell purchased the property for cleanup; the company informed living descendants in the area of the skeletal remains.

== Shell involvement ==
Pennsylvania, Ohio, and West Virginia engaged in a tax competition for the plant. In 2012, Pennsylvania structured a deal requiring Shell to invest at least $1 billion in Pennsylvania and create at least 2,500 construction jobs in exchange for a 25-year tax incentive of $66 million per year and tied to production, reducing Shell's tax by up to 20%. The combined incentive could reach $1.65 billion. Shell announced the Pennsylvania site on March 15, 2012. The deal was one of the largest tax incentives in Pennsylvania's history.

Shell began leasing the bulk of the property from Horsehead in 2012, which promptly closed the zinc plant on the site and began cleanup of the site in preparation of potentially opening a cracker plant on the site, which would be used to convert natural-gas products into ethylene and then into plastics. Shell had selected the site due to the ongoing Marcellus natural-gas trend and the site's prime location within the Marcellus Shale. By 2015, after executing several short-term lease extensions, Shell purchased the property outright from Horsehead, and subsequently purchasing other nearby properties, effectively absorbing all of Kobuta.

Shell pledged with Beaver County officials on environmental cleanup regardless if it opened the proposed plant, and in a worst-case scenario prepare the area land for at least some sort of future industrial use if Shell decided not to build there. This included building a massive bridge over PA 18, commenced in 2015, to connect both sides of the property without requiring an intersection along the route, as well as a Shell-funded rerouting of PA 18 and infrastructure improvements to I-376. Shell also gave a donation to the Beaver County recycling center so the center could extend its operating hours.

Despite a downturn in oil prices, on June 7, 2016, Shell announced it would build the plant. In a press release, Shell stated that 70% of polyethylene customers in North America were within a 700-mile (1,100 km) radius of Pittsburgh and that the location would be more cost-effective for its customers than at existing facilities along the Gulf Coast, which unlike North Central Appalachia are susceptible to the Atlantic hurricane season. Shell estimated the project would create 6,000 construction jobs to build the site and 600 permanent jobs for employees working at the plant.

== Construction ==
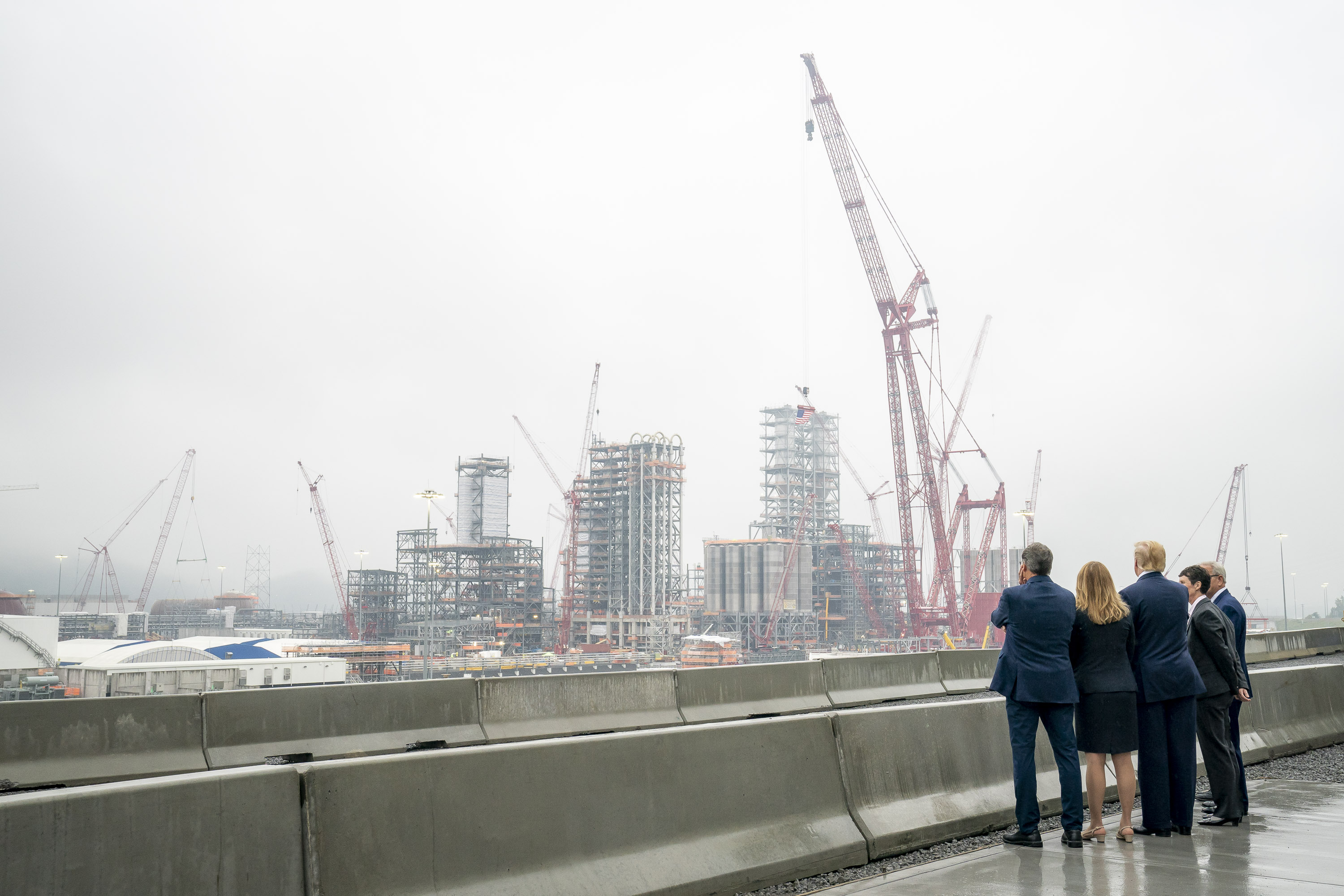
The plant is pictured under construction during a visit by president Donald Trump in August 2019.

In 2015, Shell began preparing the site for future construction, moving 7.2 million cubic yards (5,500,000 m^{3}) of dirt, building new bridges and a new rail line, and completing a total relocation of PA Route 18. Docking and bulkhead facilities to be used during construction were created by Alberici. Construction on the plant itself began on November 8, 2017. As of 2019, over 5,000 employees were working on construction.

On September 20, 2018, two of the world's largest cranes arrived on site, one 700 feet (210 m) tall and the other 430 feet (130 m) tall.

On September 25, 2018, in a conference with the Wall Street Journal, Ben van Beurden, the CEO of Royal Dutch Shell, said that the project was within budget and ahead of schedule.

The Pennsylvania Department of Environmental Protection approved two permits for a 97-mile-long (156 km) pipeline to feed the cracker plant on December 20, 2018. Called the Falcon Ethane Pipeline, it connects ethane sources in Houston, Pennsylvania, Scio, Ohio, and Cadiz, Ohio, to the plant. Construction on the pipeline began in March 2019.

=== Regional economic impact ===
The Penn-Beaver Hotel of Rochester, a building dating to the 1920s, once serving as a luxury hotel, was restored due to demand from plant construction. Parts of Northern Lights Shopping Center in Economy were demolished for redevelopment, more than likely due to the plant. However, as of January 2020, Economy Borough has not been informed of any future redevelopment plans at the site. In 2018 Mount Airy Casinos won the licensing to build a satellite casino just 12 miles (19 km) north of the cracker plant, although that plan was rejected by the Pennsylvania Gaming Control Board in November 2019

The Southern Beltway, which had already confirmed would be extending its second leg in 2020 from U.S. Route 22 to Interstate 79, moved the project up a year solely as a result of the proposed plant.

== Project opposition ==
In late 2015, a group of environmentalists submitted an appeal to Pennsylvania's Environmental Hearing Board to challenge the air quality permit that was granted for the proposed plant; the group argued that the state should have required stricter monitoring requirements for fugitive pollutant emissions from the plant.

The state of Pennsylvania allowed the factory to release 2.2 million tons of carbon dioxide each year, while Shell anticipated the plant's emissions would be below that level.

Residents also expressed concerns about the network of pipelines that would carry ethane to the plant, as existing pipelines have already caused problems. In September 2018, a landslide caused by heavy rains caused the Revolution pipeline, operated by Sunoco parent Energy Transfer Partners, to explode. One house was destroyed, other homes and vehicles were damaged, power lines were downed, and roads were closed; no one was injured.

== Operation ==
Operations started in November 2022, but the complex had to be shut down only a few months later due to a problem with a system that burns off unwanted gases. Shell agreed to pay $10 million in a settlement with the Pennsylvania Department of Environmental Protection regarding air emissions violations at the plant. The agreement included a civil penalty of nearly $5 million and an additional $5 million toward environmental projects in local communities. The plant restarted in May 2023.

In October 2024, Shell announced that the complex would fail to meet its profitability target of $1 to $1.5 billion EBITDA that year.

On June 4, 2025, the plant's #5 ethane furnace experienced a fire and explosion. The following month, Shell CEO Wael Swan announced that he was looking to sell the Monaca complex due to financial underperformance.

== In popular culture ==
Morgantown, West Virginia, country-folk musician Charles Wesley Godwin wrote his song "Cranes of Potter" about the hypothetical backstory of the woman whose buried bones were found during excavation for the complex, which he saw driving from West Virginia to his studio in Pennsylvania.
