= Dixmont State Hospital =

- Reed Hall
- U.S. National Register of Historic Places
- Pittsburgh Landmark – PHLF
- Location within Pennsylvania Location within the United States
- Location: W of Emsworth, Pennsylvania, on Huntington Rd., Kilbuck Township, Allegheny County, Pennsylvania
- Coordinates: 40°30′57″N 80°6′44″W
- Built: 1862
- Architect: Joseph W. Kerr (1815–1888)
- Architectural style: Kirkbride Plan (mental asylum)
- NRHP reference No.: 80003401

Significant dates
- Added to NRHP: November 28, 1980
- Designated PHLF: 1970

Dixmont State Hospital (originally the Department of the Insane in the Western Pennsylvania Hospital of Pittsburgh) was a hospital located northwest of Pittsburgh, Pennsylvania. Built in 1862, Dixmont was once a state-of-the-art institution known for its highly self-sufficient and park-like campus, but a decline in funding for state hospitals and changing philosophies in psychiatric care caused the hospital to be closed in 1984. After more than two decades of abandonment, it was demolished in 2006. The campus spanned a total of 407 acres (165 ha). Reed Hall is listed on the National Register of Historic Places.

== History ==
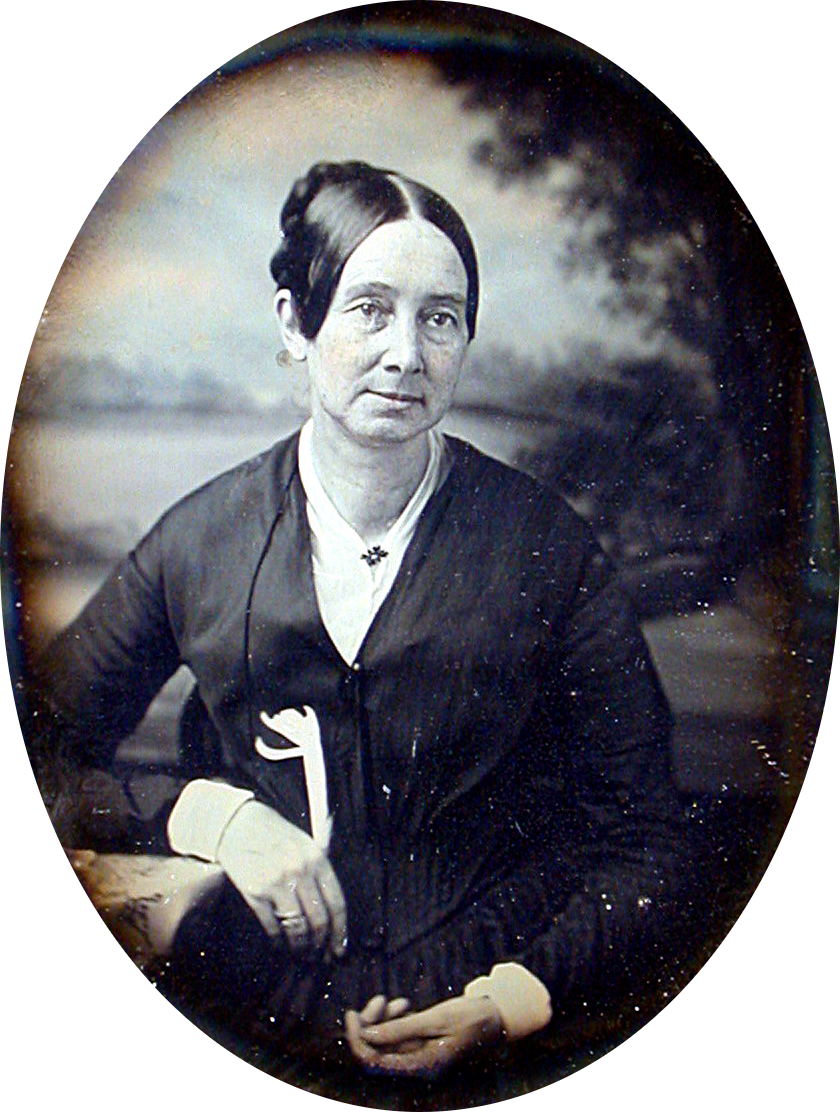
Dorothea Dix

=== Early years ===
The Western Pennsylvania Hospital at Pittsburgh ended its first year of operation in 1853, and it was evident that there were a greater number of patients in jails and charitable housing than could be provided for in the 26 beds designated for that express purpose at the hospital. Managers of the hospital used a $10,000 appropriation from the state to purchase a large amount of farmland on a hill overlooking the Ohio River to the north of Pittsburgh in what is now suburban Kilbuck. Planners originally wanted to build the institution in the city, but this idea was rejected by Dorothea Dix. Construction began in 1859, and opened in 1862. A grand ceremony took place on July 19, 1859, where the cornerstone of the Dixmont Kirkbride building was laid in the foundation. A glass jar was placed in the cornerstone containing numerous objects, papers, and a letter from Dorothea Dix herself. Also contained was a copy of her 1845 "Memorial", the 55-page county by county study of the conditions for the mentally ill in Pennsylvania, which had a great part in jump-starting early mental health care reform in Pennsylvania. Unfortunately, when the time capsule was recovered prior to demolition, the jar had broken and many of the contents were in poor condition. The original patient population of the hospital was a meager 113 patients who were transferred from the Western Pennsylvania Hospital in Pittsburgh. Before the 1800s were over, somewhere between 1,200 and 1,500 patients called the hospital home. In 1907, the facility was individually incorporated as the Dixmont Hospital for the Insane after separating from the Western Pennsylvania Hospital system. Dixmont was completely self-sustained from the beginning. It had its own farmlands, livestock, rail station, and post office. Also part of the facility was a water treatment plant, a sewage treatment plant, and electricity generating facilities. They had their own butchers, bakers, farmhands, electricians, laborers, pipe fitters, botanists, chefs, and even a barber and a dentist.

=== Financial troubles ===
Like many psychiatric hospitals, Dixmont became overcrowded during the 1920s due to the rise of posttraumatic stress disorder (PTSD) patients from World War I. The hospital took in as many patients as they could fit until beds lined the hallways, but was eventually forced to stop accepting new admissions. Dixmont began experiencing financial difficulties as early as the Great Depression where they could only afford to supply employees with room and board; no salary. In 1946, the PA Department of Welfare had to step in and Dixmont became a state-owned hospital. During this time, the hospital began using previously decried procedures such as lobotomies, electro-shock therapy, and use of restraints.

By the mid-1970s, Dixmont had reached financial crisis due to the state's desire to shut down the hospital. As the concept of deinstitutionalization and use of Thorazine progressed, large state institutions were becoming obsolete and patient numbers decreased rapidly. With the patients' rights movement, they were no longer allowed to work for profit, something which had previously generated the hospital revenue. Many of the buildings were in need of renovation, but state funding was scarce. By 1983, several floors of Reed Hall were empty and unused buildings such as the canteen and men's annex were demolished to prevent fire hazards. In July 1984, the hospital was closed down and the 300 remaining patients were transferred to nearby institutions.

== Post-closure and demolition ==
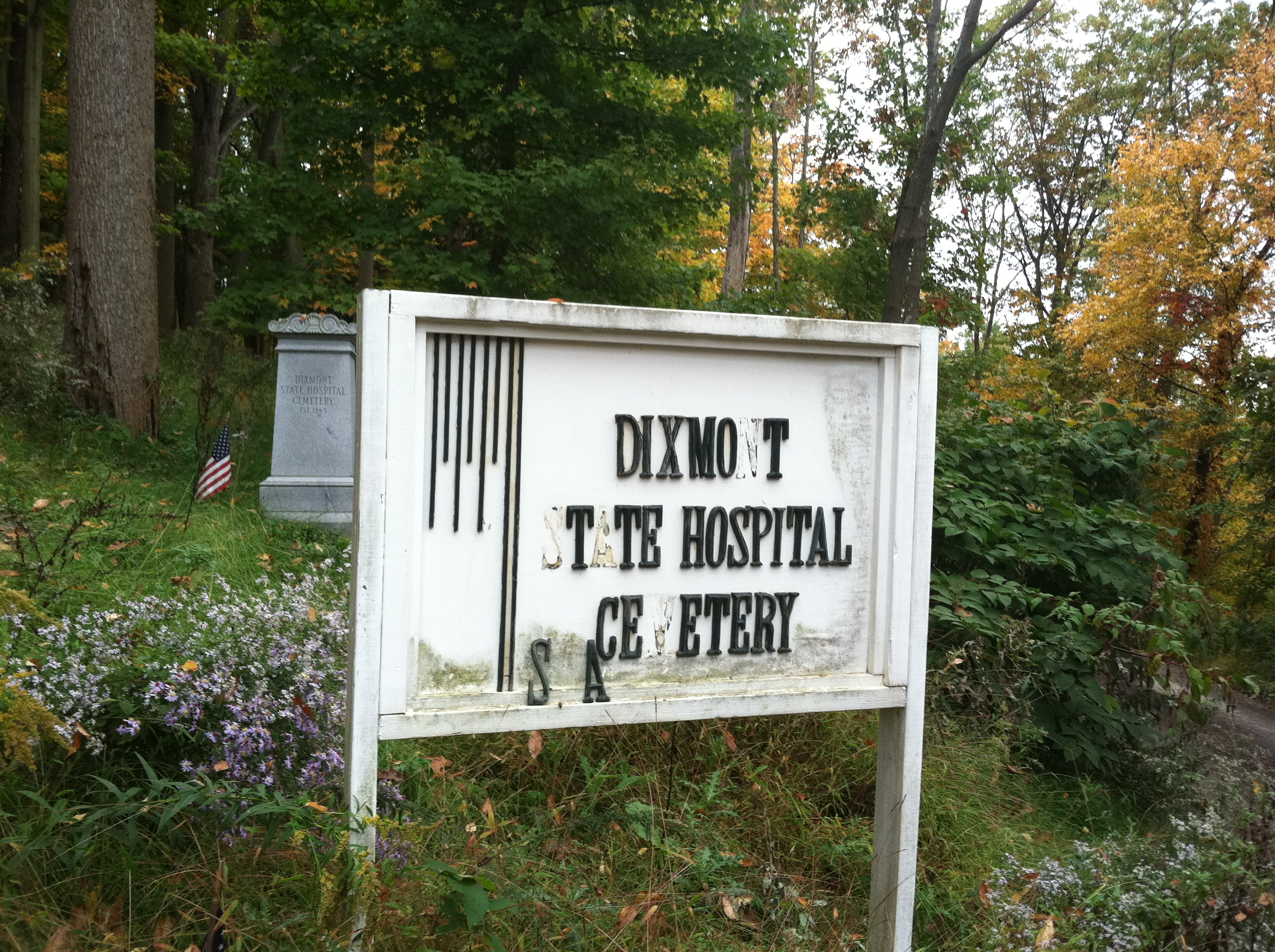
The hospital's cemetery

Shortly after the hospital's closure, several proposals were made to reuse the facilities; the leading bid was St. John's General Hospital which planned to use the geriatric and infirmary buildings to house a 200-bed nursing home and Reed Hall as independent senior-citizen living. Several proposals were also made to upgrade Dixmont's sewage treatment plant for use with Kilbuck Township. However, none of these plans came to fruition. From 1985 to 1988, Holy Family Institute leased the Cammarata building as a temporary home after their facility was damaged by fire. In the late-1980s, plans were set in place to build a county jail on the site of Dixmont. However, the proposal was unpopular with local residents and the plan was canceled in 1989. By 1999, time and many fires had left the crumbling building useless, and the State sold the 407-acre (165 ha) property to a private owner. In 2005, a local developer made an agreement to convert the 75 acres (30 ha) of that land that contained most of the buildings and demolition began in preparation for a shopping center that would be anchored by a Walmart Supercenter. Subsequent excavation destabilized the hillside and landslides covered Pennsylvania Route 65 and the Pittsburgh Line railroad tracks on the Ohio River side, shutting them both down for weeks. After numerous complaints by Kilbuck Township residents for fear of another collapse, due to the instability of the "rebuilt" landslide as well as interest in the nearby borough of Economy to build a Walmart in order to help revitalize the dilapidated Northern Lights Shopping Center located next door to that proposed Walmart site, Walmart decided not to build on the property on September 26, 2007, and the land was left to return to nature.

Even if Walmart hadn't bought the property, the Hospital would have likely been demolished anyway, due to teenagers dangerously trespassing on the property on a regular basis as well as the buildings containing both asbestos insulation and lead paint, both of which have since been outlawed for health reasons, and in the case of asbestos, has been getting removed from buildings since the 1980s. In addition, Pennsylvania law prohibits the state from selling grave sites, so the hospital's own cemetery, in which many of the patients were buried with simple stones marked only with index numbers, remains state-owned. The purchasers of the Dixmont property own the log book that identifies the markers with each patient and their number and have made the information available.

== Buildings ==
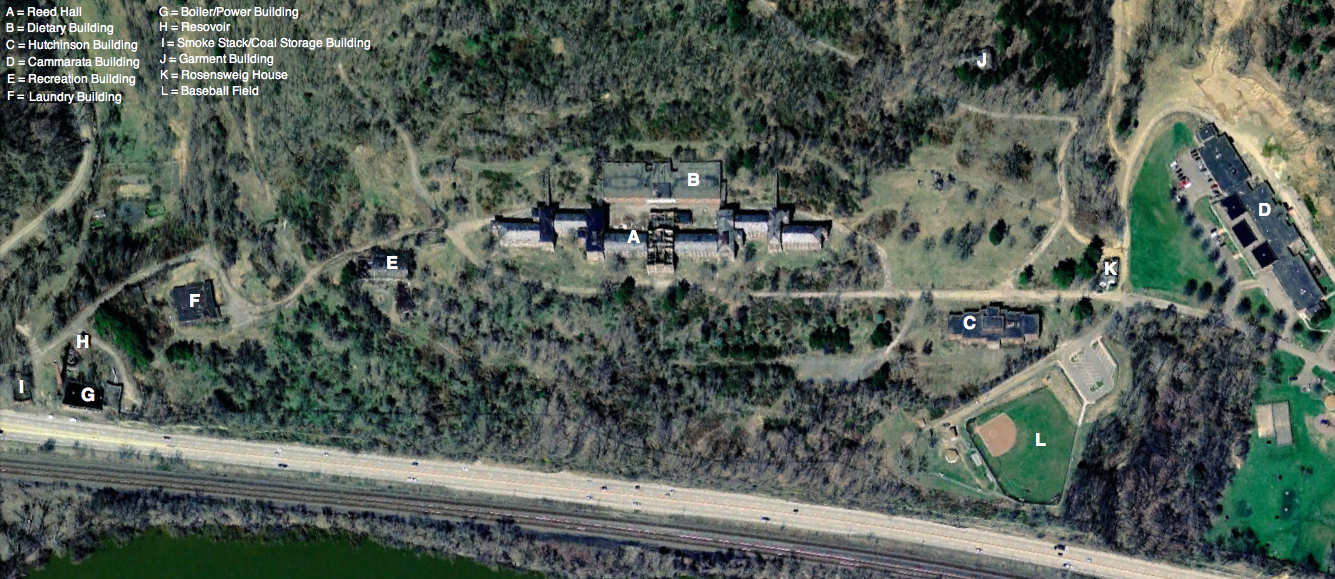
An aerial view of Dixmont State Hospital in 2005 prior to its demolition

=== Reed Hall ===
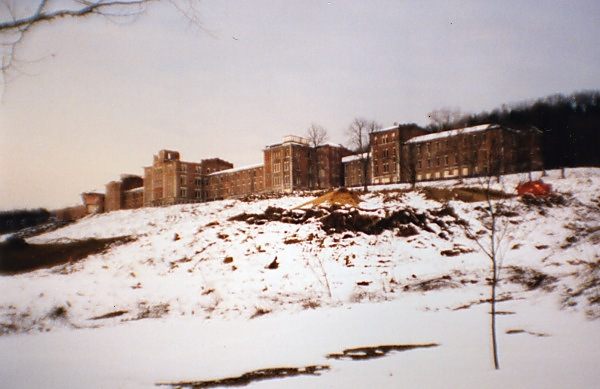
Reed Hall in December 2005

Reed Hall was the main building at Dixmont and was named after the first superintendent of Dixmont, Dr. Joseph A. Reed. It was typical of other Kirkbride facilities with the exception that the outermost wings swept forward instead of to the rear in the typical V-shape. This was to afford a better view of the river valley and better airflow, which was said to be more calming to the patients in keeping with the want of a serene setting. Early on, it had gas lighting, a central hot air system for heat, and more than ample supply of water from the Ohio River. Construction of the west wing was not complete until 1868, at which time construction of the east wing began. The center section of the building contained the front lobby, administrative offices, and chapel. This was mostly destroyed by fire in 1995.

=== Dietary building ===
The dietary building was located directly behind Reed Hall and connected through suspended walkways. Built in the early 1900s and designed by Frederick John Osterling, this building contained the main kitchen at Dixmont, the large freezers, and storage areas where food was kept. The cafeteria and auditorium were located on the second floor. Also part of this building were the loading docks, cleaning supplies, and staff quarters on the third floor.

=== Cammarata Building ===
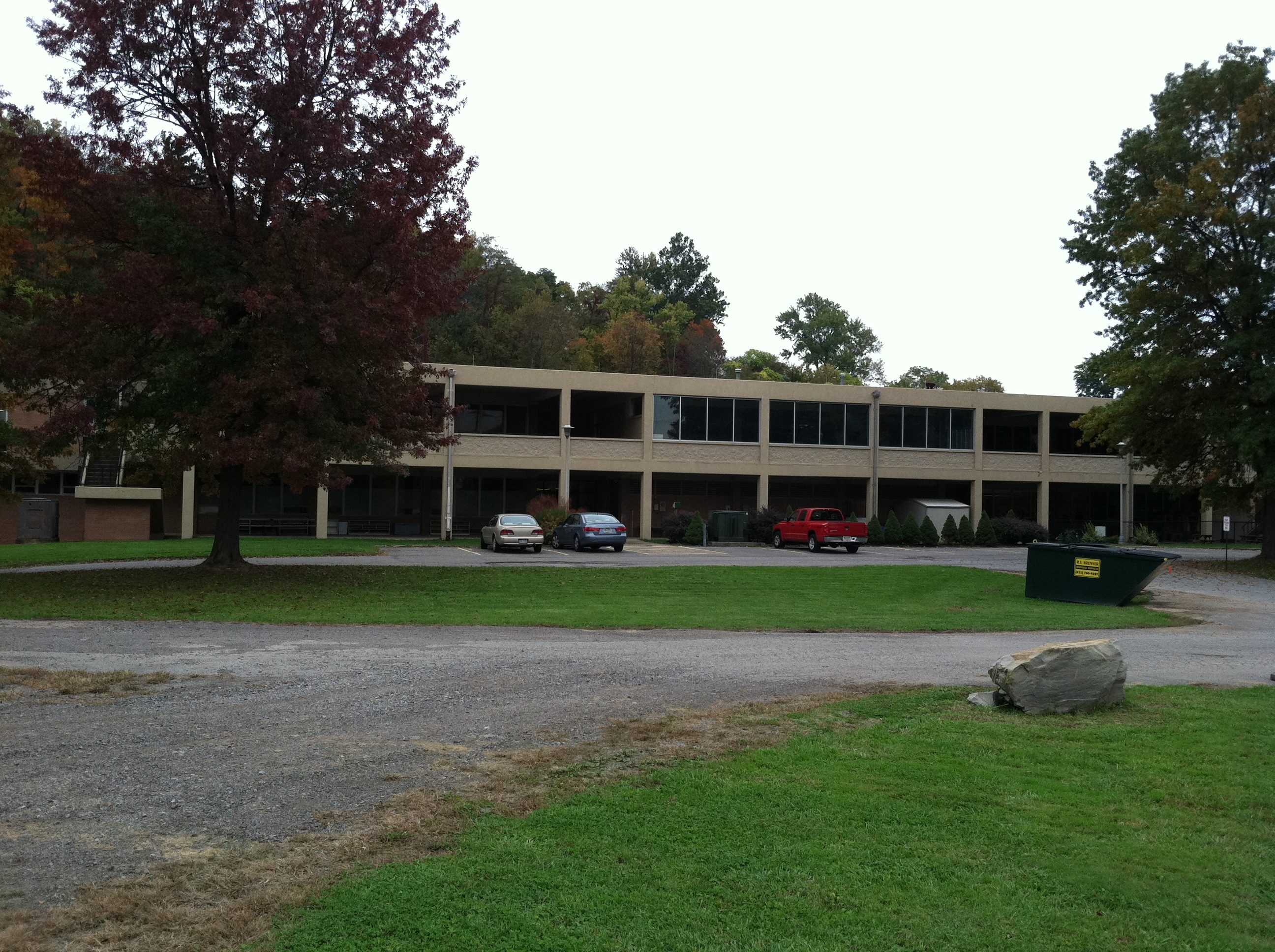
The Cammarata Building

The $2 million Cammarata Building was the geriatric center of Dixmont and housed a significant portion of the hospital's patients towards the final years. Built in 1971, its architecture stylings were modern and sleek compared to the more traditional design of Reed Hall. This building was renovated in 1999 and served as the home to the Glen Montessori School from 2001 until 2012 . It is the only building left of Dixmont that still stands today.

=== Hutchinson Building ===
The Hutchinson Building was built in 1954 and was named after the hospital's late superintendent. Construction started in 1949, but was brought to a halt when the entire foundation slid down the hill, creating a landslide much like the one that occurred in 2006. The construction site was moved to a different location and the building's design had to be altered to prevent further sliding. This building contained the intensive care unit, x-ray facilities, a small cafeteria, barber shop, isolation units, physical therapy areas, and observation rooms, and instrument sterilization equipment. Each floor had patient rooms on the ends of the building surrounding a nurses pod, all separated by half-glass walls so the nurses could easily observe all of the patients. Also in this building were the morgue, laboratory, and autopsy unit. Prior to the demolition of Dixmont, the building was assessed to decide whether it could be reused like the Cammarata Building. However, poor drainage had completely flooded the basement and renovation costs were figured to be greater than the value of the building itself, so it was demolished.

=== Other buildings ===
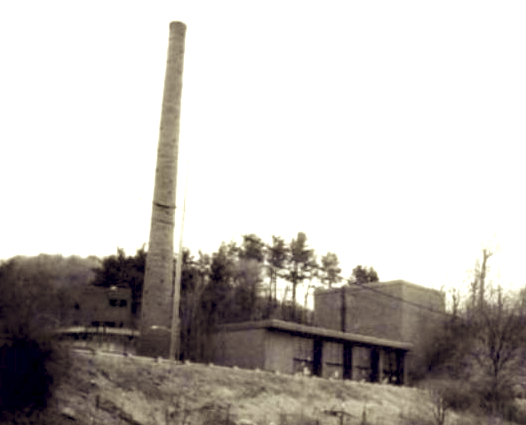
Reservoir/water treatment plant, smokestack, and boiler building

At one point, the Dixmont campus contained over 80 structures. However, in an effort to modernize the hospital, many of the unused and obsolete buildings were demolished in 1967. These included the Men's Annex (which housed many of the patients who were trusted with work details in the further reaches of the property), greenhouses, stables, barns, garages, and many cottages. To the left of Reed Hall stood the maintenance building which housed the carpenters', electrical, and machinist shops, as well as a basketball and shuffleboard court on the upper level. The four-story Industrial Arts building (sometimes referred to as the Garment Building) was built in 1933 and allowed patients to manufacture textiles, shoes, and furniture. Behind the Hutchinson building was the Rosenzweig House, an old white house that originally was home to the hospital's superintendents, but was later used as the security office. Near the service entrance on Ohio River Boulevard was the boiler building, reservoir/water treatment building, coal storage building, laundry building, and the iconic smoke stack. A sewage treatment plant was located adjacent to Tom's Run and still remains today.

== See also ==
- Mayview State Hospital
