= Hills (store) =

American discount retailer

Hills Department Stores
- Industry: Retail
- Founded: 1957; 69 years ago, Youngstown, Ohio
- Defunct: August 1999; 27 years ago
- Fate: Merged into Ames
- Successor: Ames
- Headquarters: Canton, Massachusetts
- Products: Clothing, footwear, bedding, furniture, jewelry, seasonal, beauty products, electronics, toys and housewares

Hills was an American department store chain founded in 1957 in Youngstown, Ohio, and existed until 1999 when it was acquired by Ames Department Stores Inc. Most stores were located in Ohio, Indiana, New York, Pennsylvania and West Virginia, though the company did make a push into other markets. It pushed further south and had several stores in Virginia, Tennessee, Kentucky, Indiana, and Alabama and west into Michigan.

== History ==
=== Beginning ===
In the late 1950s, Hills stores were full-fledged department stores (as opposed to the discount department stores for which the chain later became known).

Herbert H. Goldberger, the founder of Hills, sold the chain to SCOA Industries, (Shoe Company of America), of Columbus, Ohio, in 1964. He remained as president of Hills until 1981, when his son succeeded him. Goldberger was the vice president and director of SCOA when, in 1985, he led a management buyout of Hills.

Hills went public in 1987, becoming the nation's eighth-largest discount retailer. In November 1990, Goldberger's son resigned, according to a Hills statement, and was replaced by Jack Brouillard. Goldberger's resignation from his family business surprised some observers. He had been the chain's president and CEO since 1981, and assumed the role of board chairman when his father died in 1987. Stephen Goldberger also introduced several other changes, including acceptance of credit cards and rollout of UPC scanning.

In 1989, Hills bought 35 of the Worthington, Ohio,-based Gold Circle locations. In the New York and Ohio area, many of these locations had previously been Twin Fair, Inc., stores prior to 1982.

Hills had its own private label under which various goods were marketed. It was called "American Spirit". Hills also had various subsidiaries that handled some of the various operations: Hills Department Store Company, HDS Transport, CRH International, Canton Advertising, Corporate Vision and Hills Distributing Company.

=== Bankruptcy and recovery ===
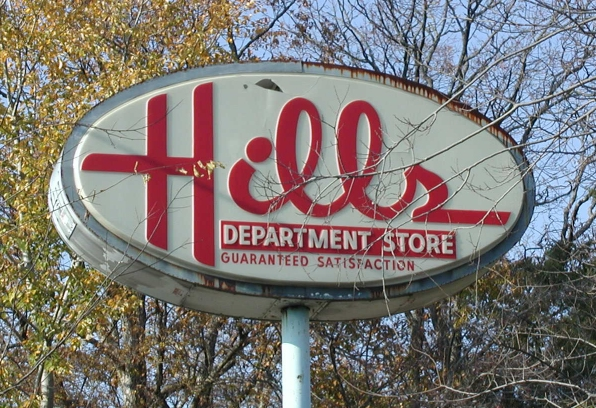
Hills Department Store Sign outside former Hermitage, Tennessee location.

Hills filed for bankruptcy protection in February 1991, and the number of stores declined, from 214 to about 150. Hills' financial woes dated back to its 1985 leveraged buyout from the Shoe Corporation of America which saddled it with debt. The leveraged buyout was valued at $640 million. Debt mounted again in 1987 when Hills went public. The situation was further aggravated in 1989 when Hills acquired 33 former Gold Circle stores. A difficult economy followed by a recession in 1990–1991 dealt the chain a crushing blow.

Michael Bozic was brought in as President and CEO of Hills to revive the company. He had spent 27 years with Sears and had been the head of the Sears Merchandising Group. Stores were remodeled, scheduled opening of distribution centers beginning in 1991, and the introduction of a new store prototype in 1991. Hills had a large toy section that accounted for more than 10% of sales throughout the year. Hills achieved a notable recovery from bankruptcy in 1993 as Hills Stores Company.

=== Takeover and acquisition by Ames ===
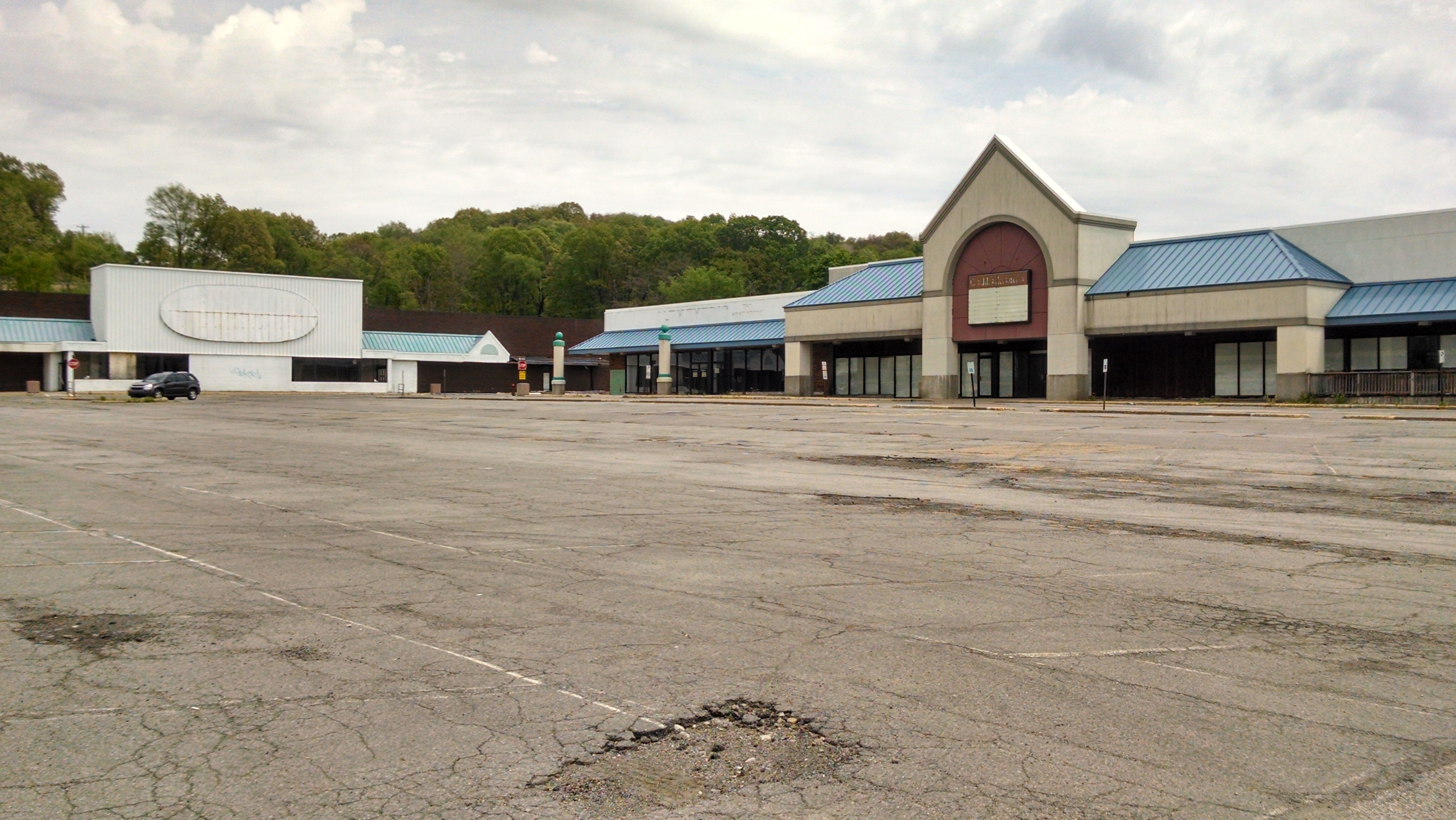
Former Hills location (left) at Northern Lights Shopping Center in Economy, Pennsylvania in 2014. Like many former Hills locations, it has been vacant since Ames' liquidation in 2002.

CEO Michael Bozic resigned, along with most of the senior executives, July 5, 1995, ending a tumultuous two-year battle for control of the regional discounter by Dickstein Partners, Hills' largest stockholder. Bozic was replaced by Jack Smailes, formerly the company's executive VP, GMM.

Dickstein resigned his post February 8, 1996, replaced as chairman by Chaim Edelstein, a former chairman of A&S Department Stores. Dickstein's resignation as chairman was joined by that of Jack Smailes, president and CEO, who was replaced by Gregory Raven, who formerly served as chief financial officer of Revco. The 164-unit discounter then announced it would seek to acquire other regional discounters in the quest to become a larger, stronger operator.

It was a difficult two years for Greg Raven and Hills. Completely new systems were instituted. "We're taking every system we have and throwing them away," Raven said. The new focus would be on merchandising systems, new financial systems, human resources, payroll, payables and eventually a new warehouse management system. A reset of the hardlines section was completed, which included lopping off 4 ft. from the end of the gondola runs to create a power aisle with pallet presentations of "good values."

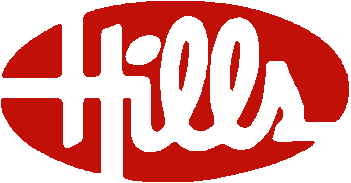
Logo variant.

On November 12, 1998, Ames acquired Hills. At that time, Hills was operating 155 stores, covering 12 states, and employing in excess of 20,000 employees. Headquarters were in Canton, Massachusetts. With the Hills acquisition, Ames expanded from 301 to 456 stores and became the nation's fourth-largest discount chain behind Walmart, Kmart, and Target. Almost all Hills stores were renamed Ames by the end of 1999, even in markets where Ames and Hills overlapped (with the exception of the one remaining Hills Department Store located in Christiansburg, Virginia). Most of the overlap was in the Pittsburgh region, where Ames had acquired the G. C. Murphy chain based in the Pittsburgh suburb of McKeesport in 1985 and was an adjacent market to Hills' original market of Youngstown. Ames, however, would experience its own financial difficulties due to the Hills purchase, and would be out of business entirely by the end of 2002.

== Legacy ==
While stores like Target, Big Lots, and Planet Fitness assumed the storefronts at some former Hills locations, many of them remain empty since the Ames liquidation.

The July 14, 2015, episode of Pittsburgh Dad, which had a Back to the Future theme, shows the titular character going back to November 5, 1989, just to shop at Hills and stop to get food at their food court.

The episode, in turn, inspired a Pittsburgh-based candle company to release a "Pittsburgh Dad's Hills Snack Bar" scented candle, intended to replicate the smell of the popular snack bar from Hills.

In 2023, a food truck intending to serve items similar to the Hills snack bar's menu passed inspection in Pennsylvania. Following a soft launch on 4th of July Weekend in Independence Township, Pennsylvania, the snack bar had its grand opening on July 15, 2023 in front of the former Hills #28 in Aliquippa, Pennsylvania (currently abandoned) at Miller & Son's Chevrolet. The snack bar will be serving at sites of former Hills locations throughout Western Pennsylvania and potentially expand into other areas.

=== Slogans ===
- "Hills is where the toys are."
- "Hills is the place for kids."
- "When you really need a low price, Hills has it every day."
- "Hills is GREAT for gifts."
- "Christmas wishes come true at Hills."
- "According to legend little folks know, Hills is where the toys are."
- "Hills is, the low cost living, anti-inflation department store."
- "We're a different kind of department store- you oughta be shopping Hills! (Check us out!)"
- "We're a different kind of discount store, and the proof is in the price!"
- "Hills Department Stores - Famous for Low Prices Everyday"
- "Hills has the hits - LPs or Cassettes" (TV commercial jingle)
- "Hills for Mom. Hills for Dad. Hills for the Family!"
- "Save every way, save every day at Hills."
- "Hills, the low-cost living, anti-inflation department store" (circa 1980-81)
- "Check Us Out!"
