= Beaver Valley Mall =

Shopping mall in Monaca, Pennsylvania

- Center court fountain
- Location: Brodhead Road (PA 18); Center Township, Pennsylvania
- Coordinates: 40.6747°N 80.3140°W
- Opened: 1970
- Developer: Cafaro Company
- Manager: Mason Asset Management
- Owner: Namdar Realty Group
- Num. of stores: 20+
- Num. of anchor tenants: 4 (3 traditional, 1 vacant)
- Floor area: 1,153,000 square feet (107,000 m^{2})
- Floors: 1 (2 in Boscov's)
- Parking: 4,391 spaces
- Public transit: BCTA bus: 2, 11
- Website: shopbeavervalley.com

The Beaver Valley Mall is a super-regional shopping mall in Center Township, Beaver County, Pennsylvania, within the Pittsburgh metropolitan area. It is owned and operated by Namdar Realty Group and Mason Asset Management, respectively. The mall features Boscov's, Rural King, and a U-Haul storage center as its anchor tenants.

== History ==
=== Opening and early years ===
On September 24, 1970, the Beaver Valley Mall held its grand opening celebration. The Joseph Horne Company, Gimbels, and Sears opened with the property as the original anchors.

=== Late 20th century ===
In 1986, after years of declining sales, Gimbles' parent company announced that the entire Gimbels Pittsburgh division was to close, selling or closing all locations. Some of the locations, such as the one in the Beaver Valley Mall, were taken over by the St. Louis based May Department Stores Company for its Pittsburgh-based Kaufmann's chain. The Beaver Valley Gimbels closed and was renovated before reopening as Kaufmann's in 1987.

In 1994, Kaufmann's celebrated a grand re-opening as it added on a second floor to the location. In 1995, Federated Department Stores acquired Horne's and renamed all former locations under its own Lazarus regional nameplate. In 1998, after operating a few years as Lazarus, Federated closed several locations including the Beaver Valley Mall store. This location was then acquired by and reopened as Boscov's in the fall of 1998.

JCPenney became the fourth anchor on September 30, 1997. The new location was built right in front of the food court, and consisted of over 126,000 square feet (11,700 m^{2}) of space.

=== 21st century – present ===
Former Children's Place, and Disney Store.

In 2006, when The May Department Stores Company was purchased by Cincinnati based Federated Department Stores, the Kaufmann's location transitioned to Macy's. Dick's Sporting Goods became the fifth anchor in 2007, being built in between JCPenney and Boscov's.

In June 2016, It was announced Sears would shutter as part of an ongoing decision to phase out of their traditional brick-and-mortar format. In 2017, it was announced that Rural King would begin renovating the previous Sears building and would open the following spring. On March 25, 2018, Rural King held a grand opening for its Beaver Valley Mall store.

On January 4, 2017, it was announced that Macy's would be closing their store at the mall as part of a plan of closing 68 under performing stores nationwide. The store would close on March 26, 2017.

In 2018, it was announced that the former Macy's building would be redeveloped into a new development called The Shops at Beaver Valley Mall, which was set to include additional retail, restaurants, as well as additional space for office, medical or other services by 2020. This development was postponed by the COVID-19 pandemic, and instead it was converted into a U-Haul self storage center and the opening of a Firehouse Subs. In 2023, the mall's Planet Fitness location closed its doors, moving down the road to a nearby strip-center.

On June 5, 2025, it was announced that JCPenney would be closing at the mall on September 17, 2025. On March 29, 2026, it was announced that Dick's Sporting Goods would be closing their store at the mall on April 25, 2026, leaving Boscov's and Rural King as the mall's last traditional anchor tenants.

== Chi-Chi's hepatitis A outbreak ==
Beaver Valley Mall was the scene of the largest hepatitis A outbreak in U.S. history when 660 people contracted the virus and four people died after eating at the Chi-Chi's Mexican restaurant in October and November 2003. After a long investigation, it was discovered that scallions imported from Mexico were the cause of the outbreak. The outbreak did not affect restaurants that were not connected to the main mall, but did affect the food court tenants for a period of time.
