= Community College of Beaver County =

College in Beaver County, Pennsylvania, U.S.

Coordinates: 40.655°N 80.306°W

- Type: Public community college
- Established: 1966; 60 years ago
- President: Roger Davis
- Faculty: 150 full- and part-time faculty
- Students: 3,600 (credit) and 3,200 (non-credit)
- Location: Center Township, Beaver County, Pennsylvania, United States
- Campus: Suburban
- Website: www.ccbc.edu

The Community College of Beaver County (CCBC) is a public community college in Beaver County, Pennsylvania. The college includes approximately 3,600 credit students and more than 3,200 non-credit students from in and around Beaver County.

== History ==
CCBC was formed in 1966 and began operating in 1967. Originally located in Freedom, Pennsylvania, this college initially leased floors of the Freedom National Bank building and seventeen vacant storefronts for classrooms and offices.

CCBC moved to Center Township, Beaver County where it created its own campus in 1971. In 1976, CCBC added a building called "The Golden Dome," a geodesic recreational facility that houses the athletic department and showcases local community events. This building is the most recognizable symbol of CCBC.

In 1990, the college created an aviation building to house its aviation program in Chippewa Township, Beaver County. The college built a new library in 1997 that also provides services to the Beaver County community.
