= Second Moon Township, Pennsylvania =

Coordinates: 40°35′N 80°22′W

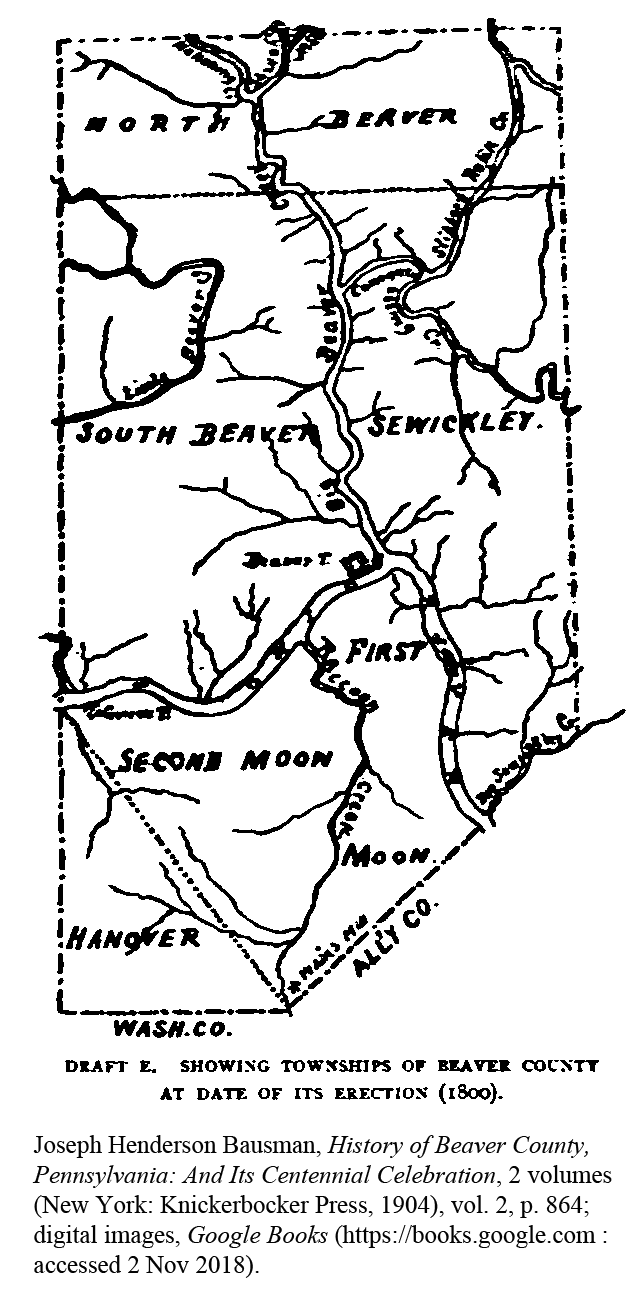

Second Moon Township, in Beaver County, Pennsylvania, was a township that existed from 1800 to 1812.

== History ==
Prior to 1789, the area south of the Ohio River was part of Washington County, and the portion to the north of the river would become part of Allegheny County. By the following year, in 1789, this area was limited only to Hanover Township, thanks to an act of the legislature that declared the portion of Washington County South of the Ohio River to be transferred to Allegheny County. Unfortunately, there is no surviving municipal map of Allegheny County from this time period, (as well as a break in the Minutes of the Court of Quarter Sessions from 1793 to 1820), due to two books having been lost or burned at the time of the burning of the second Allegheny County Courthouse in 1882. From what is remaining of those minutes, that is, up to 1793, and from the Road Dockets and Miscellaneous Dockets, it would appear that this annexed territory was considered a part of Moon Township.

Such was the case, until 1800, when Beaver County was founded. Second Moon Township, alongside its sister township of First Moon were split from Moon Township in Allegheny County, creating two of the original townships of Beaver County. Second Moon Township became one of three original townships South of the Ohio River in Beaver County at the county's creation on 12 March 1800.. The township would be short-lived, however, with Second Moon Township (and its sister township) becoming extinct in 1812 when the area in Beaver County South of the Ohio River was reorganized into four townships, dividing Second Moon's territory between Moon Township, Greene Township, and the remaining portion being annexed by Hanover Township.

== See also ==
- First Moon Township, Beaver County, Pennsylvania
