= Beaver County Transit Authority =

- Headquarters: 200 West Washington Street; Rochester, Pennsylvania
- Service area: Beaver County, Pennsylvania
- Service type: Transit bus
- Routes: 5
- Fleet: 25
- Daily ridership: 7,900 (weekdays, Q1 2026)
- Annual ridership: 547,800 (2025)
- Fuel type: Diesel; CNG
- Website: bcta.com

The Beaver County Transportation Authority (BCTA) is the operator of mass transportation in Beaver County, Pennsylvania. Seven routes are provided, all of which serve the southern and central portions of the county, which are incorporated into suburban Pittsburgh. In 2025, the system had a ridership of 547,800, or about 7,900 per weekday as of the first quarter of 2026.

== Routes ==
The agency provides three commuter services to Downtown Pittsburgh and four local routes to benefit area employees and shoppers.

- 1 Ohio River Boulevard- Chippewa, Big Beaver, Beaver Falls, New Brighton, Rochester, East Rochester, Freedom, Conway, Economy, Baden, Harmony, Ambridge to Downtown Pittsburgh (weekdays, plus Saturday service that does not travel to Pittsburgh)
- 2 Beaver Valley Mall- Rochester, Monaca, Center, Hopewell, Aliquippa, Ambridge (Mon-Sat)
- 3 Beaver/Vanport- Monaca, Vanport, Brighton, Beaver, Rochester (Mon-Sat)
- 4 Express Via I-376- Chippewa, Center to Downtown Pittsburgh (weekday rush hour)

== Fixed Route Fleet ==
- 11 MCI D4500 Diesel coaches
- 6 MCI D4500 CNG Buses
- 3 40-Foot Gillig CNG Buses
- 4 35-Foot Gillig Diesel Buses

== Park & Ride Lots ==
- Ambridge- 160 spaces (Routes 1, 2, & 3; plus Port Authority Route 14)
- Chippewa Central Square- 240 spaces (Routes 1 & 4)
- Expressway Travel Center (Center Township)- 201 spaces (Routes 2 & 4)
- Northern Lights Shopping Center (Economy)- 100 spaces (Routes 1 & 3)
- Rochester Transit Center- 73 spaces (Routes 1, 2, 3, & 11)
