= Potter Township, Beaver County, Pennsylvania =

Township in Pennsylvania, US

Coordinates: 40°40′24″N 80°19′39″W

Potter Township, Pennsylvania
- Township
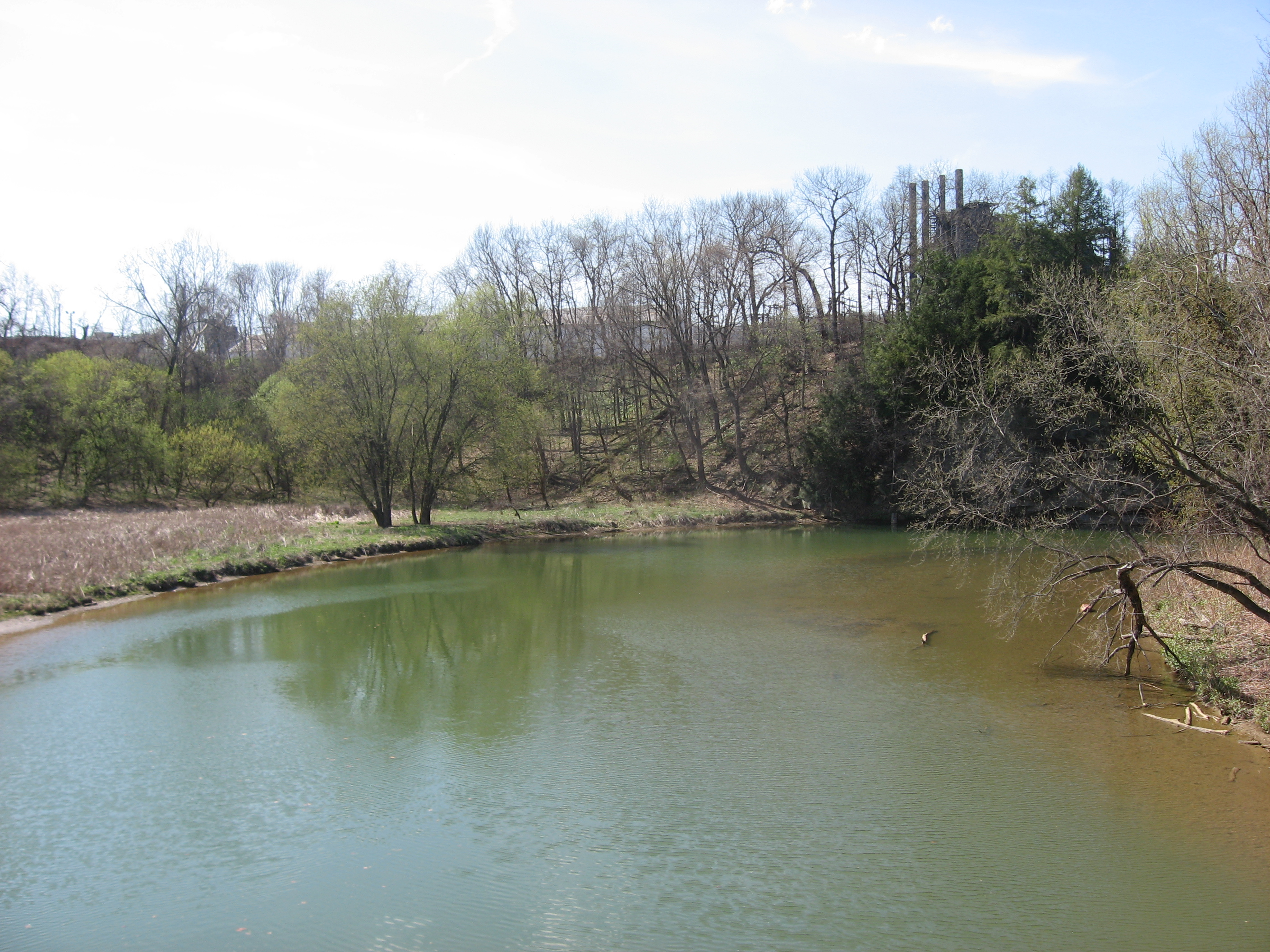
- Raccoon Creek in Potter Township, near its mouth

- Location in Beaver County and state of Pennsylvania
- Country: United States
- State: Pennsylvania
- County: Beaver
- Incorporated: 1910

Area
  - Total: 6.93 sq mi (17.95 km^{2})
  - Land: 6.46 sq mi (16.74 km^{2})
  - Water: 0.47 sq mi (1.21 km^{2})

Population (2020)
  - Total: 522 ▼
  - Estimate (2021): 516
  - Density: 89/sq mi (34.3/km^{2})
- Time zone: UTC-5 (Eastern (EST))
  - Summer (DST): UTC-4 (EDT)
- FIPS code: 42-007-62352
- Website: www.pottertwp-pa.gov

Potter Township is a township in Beaver County, Pennsylvania, United States. It is part of the Greater Pittsburgh metropolitan area. The population was 522 at the 2020 census. It is home to the Shell Pennsylvania Petrochemicals Complex.

== Geography ==
Potter Township is located in central Beaver County. According to the U.S. Census Bureau, the township has a total area of 6.9 square miles (17.9 km^{2}), of which 6.4 square miles (16.7 km^{2}) is land and 0.46 square miles (1.2 km^{2}), or 6.75%, is water.

The Ohio River forms Potter Township's northern boundary. Raccoon Creek flows through Potter Township to its confluence with the Ohio. Since 1950, Potter Township has been considered a suburb of Pittsburgh by the U.S. Census Bureau.

=== Surrounding neighborhoods ===
Potter Township has two land borders with Center Township from the west to the south and Raccoon Township from the south to the west. Across the Ohio River, Potter Township runs adjacent with, from east to west, Beaver, Vanport Township with a direct connector via Vanport Bridge on the Beaver Valley Expressway I-376, and Industry.

== Demographics ==
Historical population
Census	Pop.	Note	%±
1970	484		—
1980	605		25.0%
1990	546		−9.8%
2000	580		6.2%
2010	548		−5.5%
2020	522		−4.7%
2021 (est.)	516		−1.1%
U.S. Decennial Census

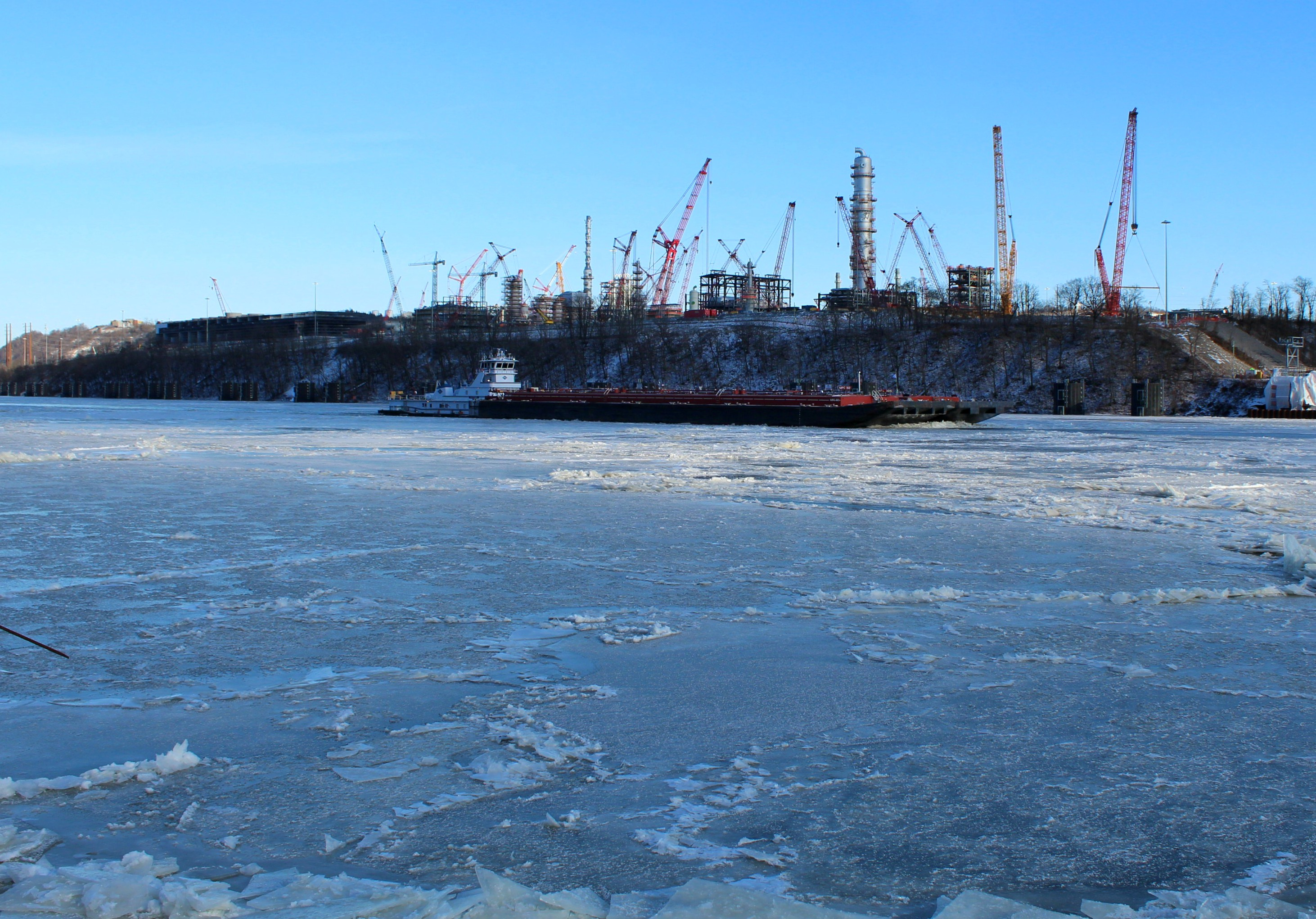
A towboat and barge on the Ohio River below the construction of the Shell Cracker Plant, January 2019.

As of the 2000 census, there were 580 people, 210 households, and 168 families residing in the township. The population density was 94.6 inhabitants per square mile (36.5/km^{2}). There were 222 housing units at an average density of 36.2 per square mile (14.0/km^{2}). The racial makeup of the township was 99.14% White, 0.34% Native American, and 0.52% from two or more races.

There were 210 households, out of which 35.2% had children under the age of 18 living with them, 69.0% were married couples living together, 7.1% had a female householder with no husband present, and 20.0% were non-families. 18.1% of all households were made up of individuals, and 7.6% had someone living alone who was 65 years of age or older. The average household size was 2.76 and the average family size was 3.13.

In the township, the population was spread out, with 23.3% under the age of 18, 8.8% from 18 to 24, 28.3% from 25 to 44, 31.7% from 45 to 64, and 7.9% who were 65 years of age or older. The median age was 38 years. For every 100 females, there were 105.7 males. For every 100 females age 18 and over, there were 102.3 males.

The median income for a household in the township was $48,438, and the median income for a family was $51,500. Males had a median income of $38,000 versus $19,219 for females. The per capita income for the township was $20,451. About 1.7% of families and 3.3% of the population were below the poverty line, including 3.2% of those under age 18 and 5.0% of those age 65 or over.
